= 2026 in the United States =

- Decades: 2000s; 2010s; 2020s; 2030s
- See also: History of the United States (2016–present); Timeline of United States history (2010–present); List of years in the United States

The following is a list of events of the year 2026 in the United States, as well as predicted and scheduled events that have not yet occurred.

July 4, 2026 was the 250th anniversary of the signing of the Declaration of Independence of the United States from Great Britain.

Under the second year of Donald Trump's second presidency, the United States has engaged in attacks against its adversaries. In January 2026, the U.S. launched a military raid in Venezuela that captured its president Nicolás Maduro. In February 2026, the U.S. launched a major attack on Iran with Israel with the stated goal of regime change, killing its leader Ali Khamenei. Domestically, the US underwent two partial government shutdowns, with the first lasting four days, from January 31 to February 3, and the second lasting approximately 76 days, from February 14 to April 30, becoming the longest government shutdown in U.S. history and impacting the US Department of Homeland Security, with the core issue regarding the funding of Immigration and Customs Enforcement. In addition, 2026 saw the first major judicial actions against prediction markets, in particular Kalshi and the usage of its platform and other prediction markets to bypass state regulations on sports betting, with Nevada being the first to land a court-enforced ban of Kalshi and Arizona being the first to file criminal charges against Kalshi.

In science and technology, the most prominent story so far has been the April 2026 NASA mission Artemis II, the first crewed deep-space mission since 1972. Artemis II sent four astronauts—including the first woman, person of color, and Canadian—to circumnavigate the Moon.

The 2026 FIFA World Cup was held across the U.S., Canada, and Mexico from June to July. On November 3, the 2026 midterms took place.

== Incumbents ==
=== Federal government ===
- President: Donald Trump (R-Florida)
- Vice President: JD Vance (R-Ohio)
- Chief Justice: John Roberts (Maryland)
- Speaker of the House of Representatives: Mike Johnson (R-Louisiana)
- Senate Majority Leader: John Thune (R-South Dakota)
- Congress: 119th

=== State governments ===
Governors and lieutenant governors

==== Governors ====
- Governor of Alabama: Kay Ivey (Republican)
- Governor of Alaska: Mike Dunleavy (Republican)
- Governor of Arizona: Katie Hobbs (Democratic)
- Governor of Arkansas: Sarah Huckabee Sanders (Republican)
- Governor of California: Gavin Newsom (Democratic)
- Governor of Colorado: Jared Polis (Democratic)
- Governor of Connecticut: Ned Lamont (Democratic)
- Governor of Delaware: Matt Meyer (Democratic)
- Governor of Florida: Ron DeSantis (Republican)
- Governor of Georgia: Brian Kemp (Republican)
- Governor of Hawaii: Josh Green (Democratic)
- Governor of Idaho: Brad Little (Republican)
- Governor of Illinois: J. B. Pritzker (Democratic)
- Governor of Indiana: Mike Braun (Republican)
- Governor of Iowa: Kim Reynolds (Republican)
- Governor of Kansas: Laura Kelly (Democratic)
- Governor of Kentucky: Andy Beshear (Democratic)
- Governor of Louisiana: Jeff Landry (Republican)
- Governor of Maine: Janet Mills (Democratic)
- Governor of Maryland: Wes Moore (Democratic)
- Governor of Massachusetts: Maura Healey (Democratic)
- Governor of Michigan: Gretchen Whitmer (Democratic)
- Governor of Minnesota: Tim Walz (Democratic)
- Governor of Mississippi: Tate Reeves (Republican)
- Governor of Missouri: Mike Kehoe (Republican)
- Governor of Montana: Greg Gianforte (Republican)
- Governor of Nebraska: Jim Pillen (Republican)
- Governor of Nevada: Joe Lombardo (Republican)
- Governor of New Hampshire: Kelly Ayotte (Republican)
- Governor of New Jersey: Phil Murphy (Democratic) (until January 20); Mikie Sherrill (Democratic) (since January 20)
- Governor of New Mexico: Michelle Lujan Grisham (Democratic)
- Governor of New York: Kathy Hochul (Democratic)
- Governor of North Carolina: Josh Stein (Democratic)
- Governor of North Dakota: Kelly Armstrong (Republican)
- Governor of Ohio: Mike DeWine (Republican)
- Governor of Oklahoma: Kevin Stitt (Republican)
- Governor of Oregon: Tina Kotek (Democratic)
- Governor of Pennsylvania: Josh Shapiro (Democratic)
- Governor of Rhode Island: Daniel McKee (Democratic)
- Governor of South Carolina: Henry McMaster (Republican)
- Governor of South Dakota: Larry Rhoden (Republican)
- Governor of Tennessee: Bill Lee (Republican)
- Governor of Texas: Greg Abbott (Republican)
- Governor of Utah: Spencer Cox (Republican)
- Governor of Vermont: Phil Scott (Republican)
- Governor of Virginia: Glenn Youngkin (Republican) (until January 17), Abigail Spanberger (Democratic) (since January 17)
- Governor of Washington: Bob Ferguson (Democratic)
- Governor of West Virginia: Patrick Morrisey (Republican)
- Governor of Wisconsin: Tony Evers (Democratic)
- Governor of Wyoming: Mark Gordon (Republican)

==== Lieutenant governors ====
- Lieutenant Governor of Alabama: Will Ainsworth (Republican)
- Lieutenant Governor of Alaska: Nancy Dahlstrom (Republican)
- Lieutenant Governor of Arkansas: Leslie Rutledge (Republican)
- Lieutenant Governor of California: Eleni Kounalakis (Democratic)
- Lieutenant Governor of Colorado: Dianne Primavera (Democratic)
- Lieutenant Governor of Connecticut: Susan Bysiewicz (Democratic)
- Lieutenant Governor of Delaware: Kyle Evans Gay (Democratic)
- Lieutenant Governor of Florida: Jay Collins (Republican)
- Lieutenant Governor of Georgia: Burt Jones (Republican)
- Lieutenant Governor of Hawaii: Sylvia Luke (Democratic)
- Lieutenant Governor of Idaho: Scott Bedke (Republican)
- Lieutenant Governor of Illinois: Juliana Stratton (Democratic)
- Lieutenant Governor of Indiana: Micah Beckwith (Republican)
- Lieutenant Governor of Iowa: Chris Cournoyer (Republican)
- Lieutenant Governor of Kansas: David Toland (Democratic)
- Lieutenant Governor of Kentucky: Jacqueline Coleman (Democratic)
- Lieutenant Governor of Louisiana: Billy Nungesser (Republican)
- Lieutenant Governor of Maryland: Aruna Miller (Democratic)
- Lieutenant Governor of Massachusetts: Kim Driscoll (Democratic)
- Lieutenant Governor of Michigan: Garlin Gilchrist (Democratic)
- Lieutenant Governor of Minnesota: Peggy Flanagan (Democratic)
- Lieutenant Governor of Mississippi: Delbert Hosemann (Republican)
- Lieutenant Governor of Missouri: David Wasinger (Republican)
- Lieutenant Governor of Montana: Kristen Juras (Republican)
- Lieutenant Governor of Nebraska: Joe Kelly (Republican)
- Lieutenant Governor of Nevada: Stavros Anthony (Democratic)
- Lieutenant Governor of New Jersey: Tahesha Way (Democratic) (until January 20), Dale Caldwell (Democratic) (January 20-September 25)
- Lieutenant Governor of New Mexico: Howie Morales (Democratic)
- Lieutenant Governor of New York: Antonio Delgado (Democratic)
- Lieutenant Governor of North Carolina: Rachel Hunt (Democratic)
- Lieutenant Governor of North Dakota: Michelle Strinden (Republican)
- Lieutenant Governor of Ohio: Jim Tressel (Republican)
- Lieutenant Governor of Oklahoma: Matt Pinnell (Republican)
- Lieutenant Governor of Pennsylvania: Austin Davis (Democratic)
- Lieutenant Governor of Rhode Island: Sabina Matos (Democratic)
- Lieutenant Governor of South Carolina: Pamela Evette (Republican)
- Lieutenant Governor of South Dakota: Tony Venhuizen (Republican)
- Lieutenant Governor of Tennessee: Randy McNally (Republican)
- Lieutenant Governor of Texas: Dan Patrick (Republican)
- Lieutenant Governor of Utah: Deidre Henderson (Republican)
- Lieutenant Governor of Vermont: John S. Rodgers (Republican)
- Lieutenant Governor of Virginia: Winsome Earle-Sears (Republican) (until January 17), Ghazala Hashmi (Democratic) (since January 17)
- Lieutenant Governor of Washington: Denny Heck (Democratic)
- Lieutenant Governor of West Virginia: Randy Smith (Republican)
- Lieutenant Governor of Wisconsin: Sara Rodriguez (Democratic)

== Elections ==
The midterm elections were held on November 3. In the federal government, the offices that were up for election were all 435 seats of the House of Representatives, and roughly one third of the Senate. Most states and territories also held elections for their governors and legislatures.

In the Senate, nine senators announced their intention not to seek re-election this cycle, including five Republicans and four Democrats. Republican seats in Maine, North Carolina, and Ohio were seen as vulnerable, while Democrats won seats in those states as well as seats in Georgia, Michigan, and New Hampshire. In the House, numerous states have redrawn their congressional districts ahead of the election, with Republicans attempting to strengthen their narrow margins.

On the state level, 36 states and three territories held gubernatorial elections, and most states and territories held elections for their legislatures. Many major cities, including Long Beach, Los Angeles, Louisville, Newark, Oakland, Oklahoma City, St. Petersburg, and Washington, D.C., also elected their mayors and municipal governments.

== Events ==
=== January ===
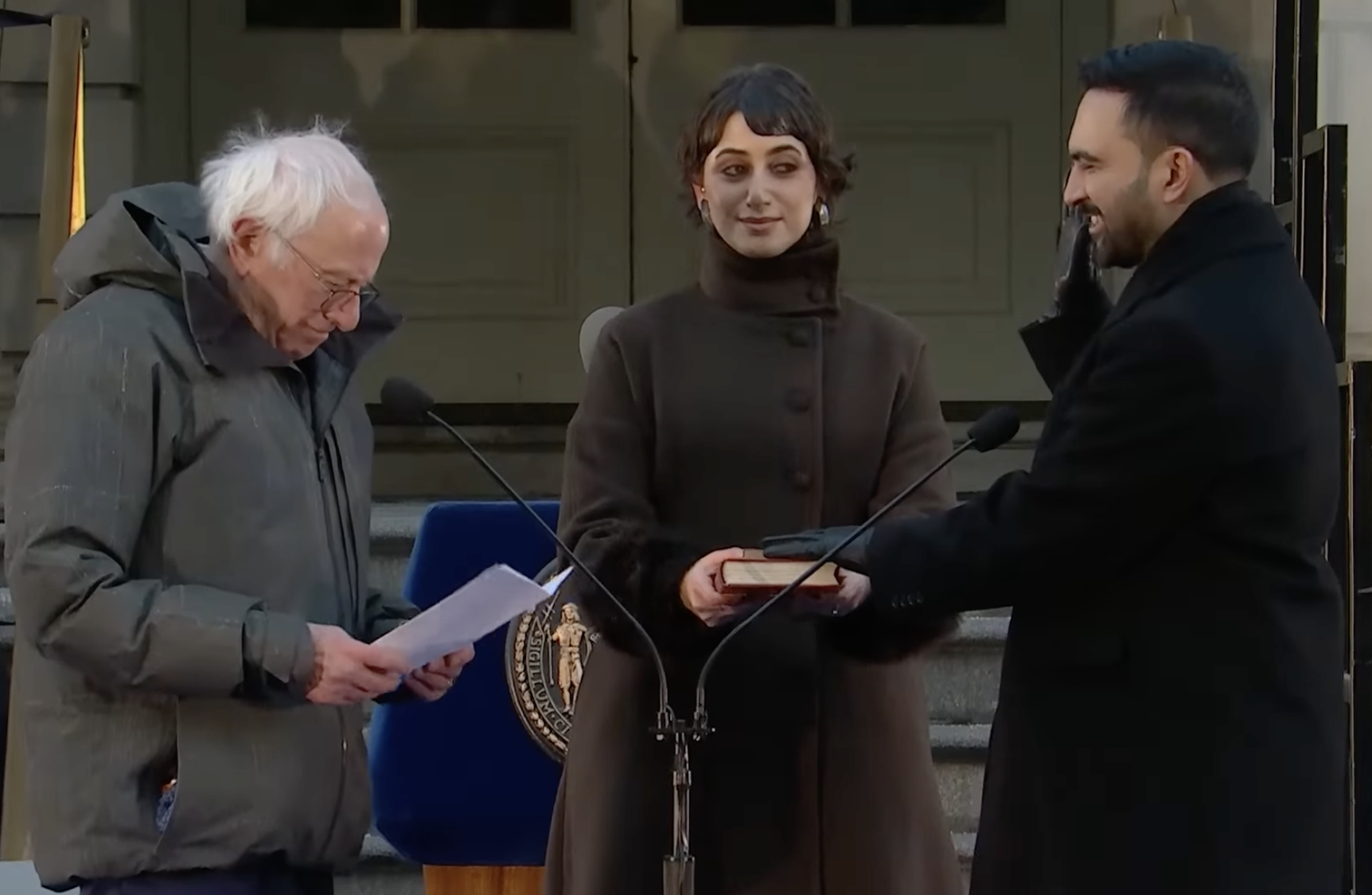
January 1: Zohran Mamdani is sworn in as Mayor of New York City by Bernie Sanders and accompanied by his wife Rama Duwaji.

- January 1 – Zohran Mamdani is sworn in as the Mayor of New York City, becoming the first Muslim and Asian American to hold the office.
- January 3 – The U.S. launches airstrikes on Venezuela and captures Venezuelan president Nicolás Maduro and his wife, Cilia Flores. The operation is named Absolute Resolve.
- January 4 – 31st Critics' Choice Awards: One Battle After Another and its director Paul Thomas Anderson win Best Picture and Best Director respectively. Films Frankenstein and Sinners and television series Adolescence win four awards each.
- January 5
  - Maduro and his wife appear in a federal court in Manhattan and plead not guilty to drugs and weapon charges.
  - New coins celebrating the Semiquincentennial, featuring pilgrims, George Washington, Thomas Jefferson, and James Madison, begin circulating.
  - Minnesota governor Tim Walz announces he will not seek reelection amidst the Minnesota fraud scandal.
  - The Corporation for Public Broadcasting votes to dissolve itself.
  - The Centers for Disease Control and Prevention rewrites its childhood vaccine schedule, reducing the number of shots universally recommended from 17 to 11.

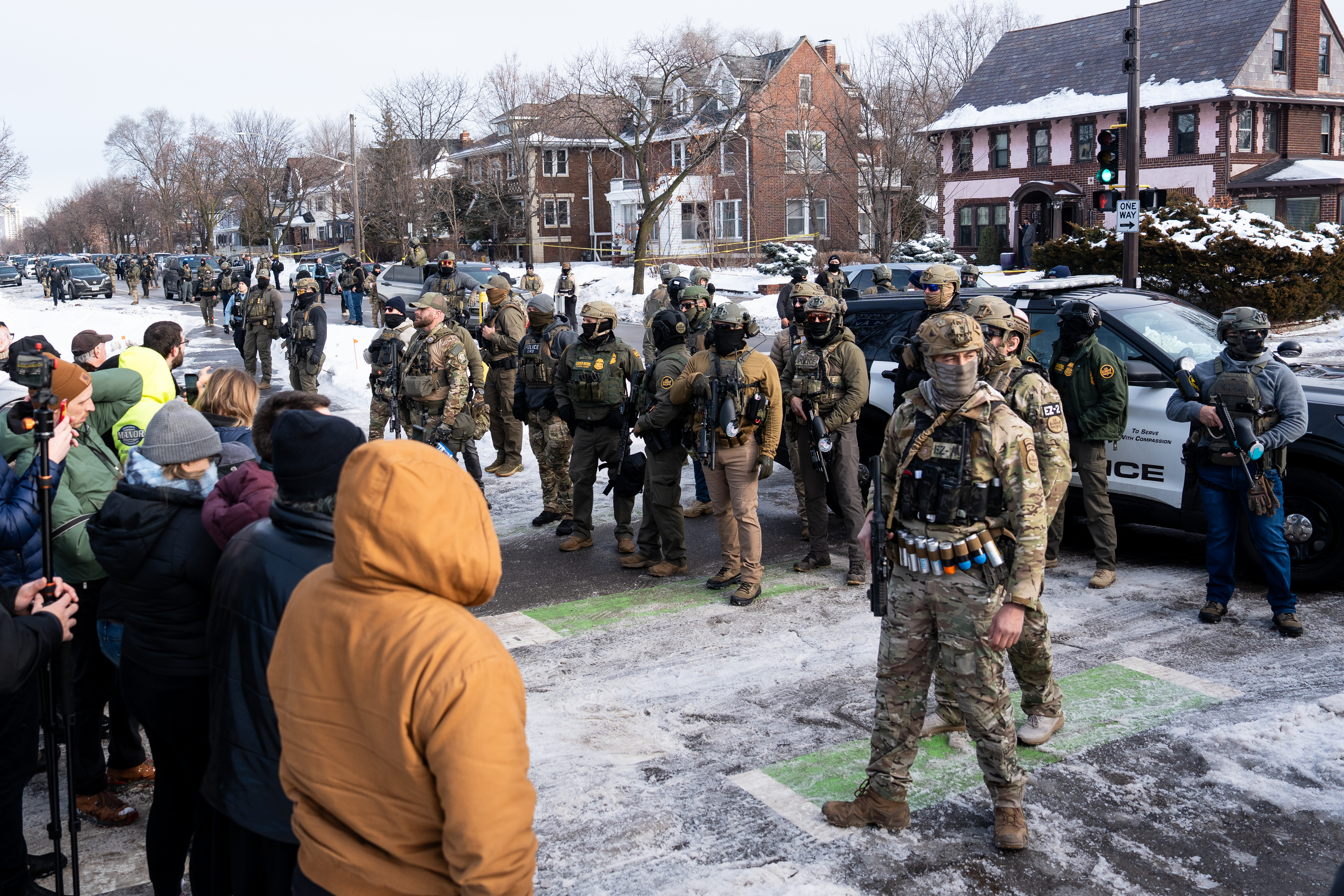
January 7: ICE agents stand off with civilians in Minneapolis following the killing of Renée Good.

- January 7
  - Killing of Renée Good: a 37-year-old woman is shot and killed by an Immigration and Customs Enforcement officer in Minneapolis, Minnesota.
  - Trump announces that the United States will withdraw from 66 international organizations.
  - The Department of State suspends all ongoing assistance programs to Somalia.
  - Two people are killed and six others are injured in a mass shooting during a funeral at a LDS Church meetinghouse in Salt Lake City, Utah.
- January 10 – 2025–26 measles outbreak: North Carolina experiences a surge in measles over the past week, with cases rising to 310 in the state alone. Nearly 2,500 are reported nationally.
- January 11
  - Federal prosecutors open a criminal investigation into Federal Reserve chair Jerome Powell over the testimony he gave to a Senate committee about renovations to Federal Reserve buildings.
  - Low-cost airline Allegiant Air purchases Sun Country Airlines for $1.5 billion.
  - Three inmates are killed, thirteen others are hospitalized, and a guard is injured when violence breaks out at the Washington State Prison in Davisboro, Georgia.
- January 12
  - Mattel launches its first autistic Barbie.
- January 13
  - The Trump administration designates the Muslim Brotherhood in Egypt, the Islamic Group in Lebanon, and the Islamic Action Front in Jordan as foreign terrorist organizations for their support of Hamas.
  - Meta announces the closure of the studios Armature Studio, Sanzaru Games, and Twisted Pixel. In addition, they announced more than 1,000 workers would be laid off in their Reality Labs business.
- January 14
  - The Senate is unable to pass a resolution which would bar the president from taking further military action in Venezuela without congressional approval after two Republicans switch their initial vote.
  - A Verizon outage affects at least 175,000 people.
- January 17 – Trump confirms that European countries will be hit with a 10% tariff on "all or any goods" exported to the US from February 1, amid the dispute over Greenland.
- January 19 – The Indiana Hoosiers defeat the Miami Hurricanes 27–21 in the 2026 College Football Playoff National Championship, winning their first national title.
- January 20 – DHS launches "Operation Catch of the Day", a surge in immigration enforcement in Maine, primarily in the cities of Lewiston and Portland.

The World Health Organization's members after the United States left the agency.

- January 22
  - The United States leaves the World Health Organization.
  - Trump's Executive Order 14253 is carried out, removing exhibits commemorating the history of slavery in the United States at the President's House.
- January 23 – The Office of Foreign Assets Control imposes sanctions on British-Palestinian activist Zaher Birawi, alleging that he has ties with Hamas.
- January 23–26 – A major winter storm and cold wave impact over 30 states and kill at least 85 people, with over 15 states of emergency being declared.

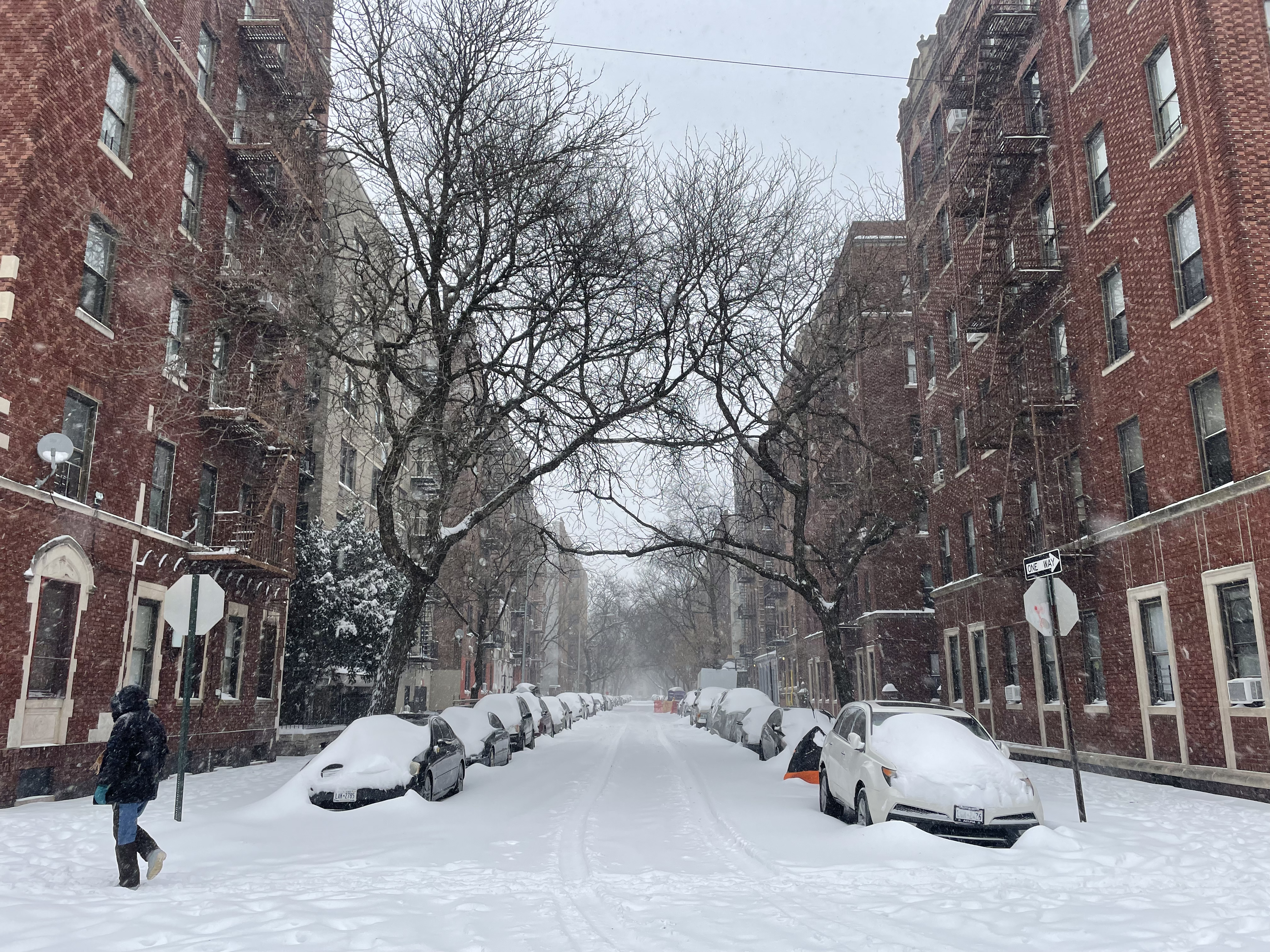
A major winter storm impacts over 30 states and northern Mexico.

- January 24
  - Trump threatens Canada with 100% tariffs on all goods if the country's prime minister Mark Carney strikes a trade deal with China.
  - Killing of Alex Pretti: a 37-year-old man is shot and killed by United States Immigration and Customs Enforcement agents in Minneapolis, Minnesota.
  - One person is killed and 14 others are injured in a gas explosion and multiple-alarm fire at a 17-story apartment building in the Bronx.
- January 25
  - Over a million people are without power across the South and at least 10,000 flights are canceled due to the winter storm.
  - Six people are killed when a Bombardier Challenger 650 aircraft crashes at Bangor International Airport in Maine.
- January 27 – Representative Ilhan Omar is attacked during a town hall meeting in Minneapolis when an audience member sprays a chemical substance at her. A 55-year-old man is arrested and charged with third-degree assault, while Omar herself is uninjured.
- January 28
  - FBI investigation into the 2020 United States presidential election in Georgia: the Federal Bureau of Investigation raids the election center in Fulton County, Georgia.
  - Amazon announces 16,000 job layoffs in its second round of corporate reduction.
- January 29 – Journalist and former CNN host Don Lemon is arrested by federal authorities after he reported on a protest inside a church in St. Paul, Minnesota earlier in the month.
- January 30
  - Three million pages related to the Epstein Files, including 2,000 videos and 180,000 images, are released to the public, implicating many high-profile public figures worldwide.
  - Killing of Brian Thompson: Judge Margaret Garnett dismisses the federal murder and weapon charges against Luigi Mangione, ruling out the death penalty against Mangione. However, the judge maintains the stalking charges, which carries a maximum sentence of life imprisonment.
- January 31
  - Five people, including a 6-year-old, are wounded in a shooting at the Mardi Gras parade in Clinton, Louisiana.
  - Nancy Guthrie, mother of Today co-host Savannah Guthrie, is abducted from her home in the Catalina Foothills area north of Tucson, Arizona.
  - A federal government shutdown begins.

=== February ===
- February 1 – The 68th Annual Grammy Awards are held at the Crypto.com Arena in Los Angeles, honoring the best in music from September 2024 to August 2025. "Luther" by Kendrick Lamar and SZA wins Record of the Year while Debí Tirar Más Fotos by Bad Bunny wins Album of the Year, the first Spanish-language album to do so. Kendrick Lamar wins five awards and surpasses Jay-Z as the most awarded hip-hop artist in Grammy Awards history.

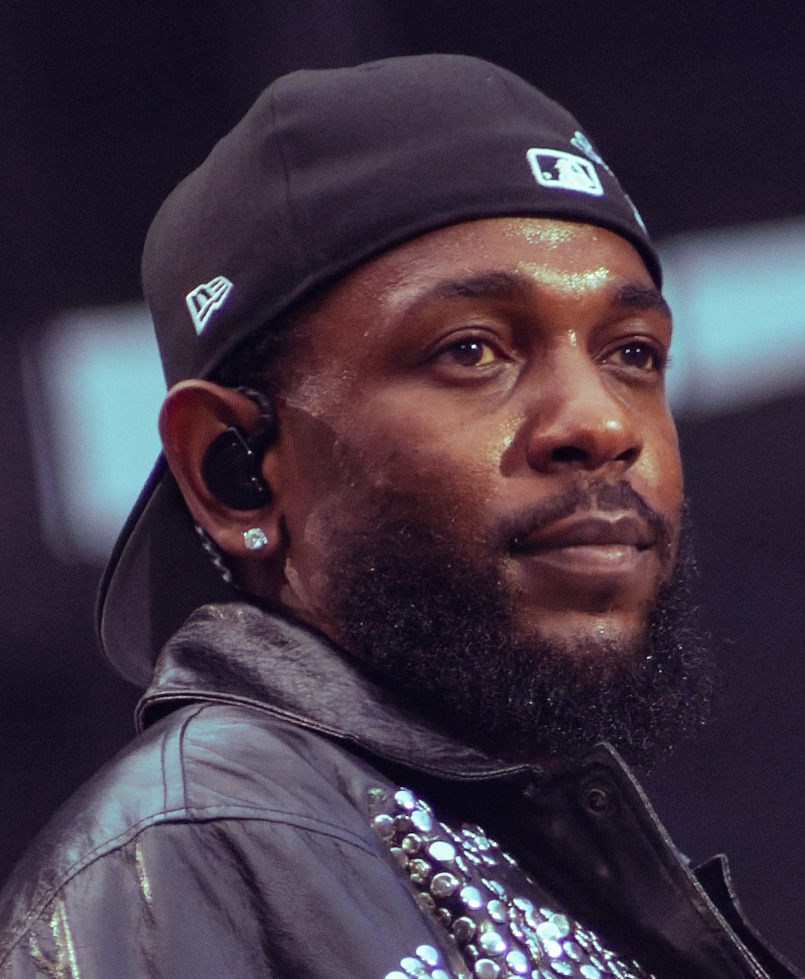
February 1: Kendrick Lamar becomes the most awarded hip-hop artist after winning five awards at the Grammys.

- February 3 – The government shutdown ends with a bill that funds DHS for two weeks.
- February 4
  - The Central Intelligence Agency announces it will no longer publish The World Factbook.
  - Decline of newspapers: The Washington Post announces 300 journalist layoffs, roughly one-third of its employees, as part of a major restructuring.
- February 5
  - The New START treaty limiting strategic nuclear weapons with Russia expires.
  - Three people are killed and seven others are injured when a car crashes into a 99 Ranch Market in Westwood, Los Angeles, California.
- February 6 – Trump shares a video on social media depicting Barack and Michelle Obama as apes. Trump receives bipartisan condemnation.
- February 8 – Super Bowl LX is played at Levi's Stadium in Santa Clara, California, with the Seattle Seahawks prevailing over the New England Patriots. Bad Bunny headlines the halftime show with special guests Lady Gaga and Ricky Martin, while Kid Rock performs at the Turning Point alternate All-American Halftime Show.
- February 10 – Trump threatens the opening of the Gordie Howe International Bridge, saying the U.S. should be "fully compensated for everything" it has given to Canada, and demanding that Ottawa "treats the United States with the Fairness and Respect that we deserve".
- February 11 – The Federal Aviation Administration abruptly announces a 10-day temporary flight restriction (TFR) over El Paso, Texas, and surrounding areas (specifically a 10-mile radius surrounding El Paso International Airport). All air traffic is prohibited, including civilian airliners, general aviation, and medical flights. The FAA states that the TFR is because of an 'incursion' of cartel-operated drones. Despite the initial 10-day window, flights resume only hours later.
- February 12
  - The Endangerment Finding of 2009, regulating six greenhouse gases as air pollution, is repealed by the Environmental Protection Agency.
  - At least six people are killed in a killing spree in Sarasota and Fort Lauderdale, Florida.
  - White House "border czar" Tom Homan announces that ICE will end its recent immigration crackdown in the Twin Cities, Minnesota.

February 12: The EPA repeals the Endangerment Finding act that regulated six greenhouse gases as air pollution.

- February 14 – A second shutdown affecting only the Department of Homeland Security begins.
- February 16 – A mass shooting occurs at the Dennis M. Lynch Arena in Pawtucket, Rhode Island, during a high school ice hockey game. The attack results in the deaths of three people, and three others hospitalized.
- February 17
  - Tributes are paid to Jesse Jackson following the announcement of the civil rights leader's death at the age of 84.
  - Tricia McLaughlin resigns as Assistant Secretary for Public Affairs in the United States Department of Homeland Security and will leave the Trump administration amidst backlash about Trump's hardline immigration policies.
  - An avalanche kills eight skiers northwest of Lake Tahoe in California.
  - San Antonio Express-News publishes a story about Tony Gonzales's affair.
- February 19 – Trump announces he is transferring $10 billion from the US government to his "Board of Peace" which he chairs.
- February 20 – Legal affairs of the second Trump presidency: The U.S. Supreme Court holds in a 6–3 ruling that the IEEPA does not give the President the power to set tariffs, striking down Trump's sweeping emergency tariffs via executive orders.
- February 21 – Trump announces that he will increase global tariffs to 15% following the Supreme Court decision the previous day, effective from February 24.
- February 22 – A 21-year-old man is shot and killed after entering the secure perimeter of Trump's Mar-a-Lago residence. The suspect is described as a white male carrying a shotgun and fuel can.

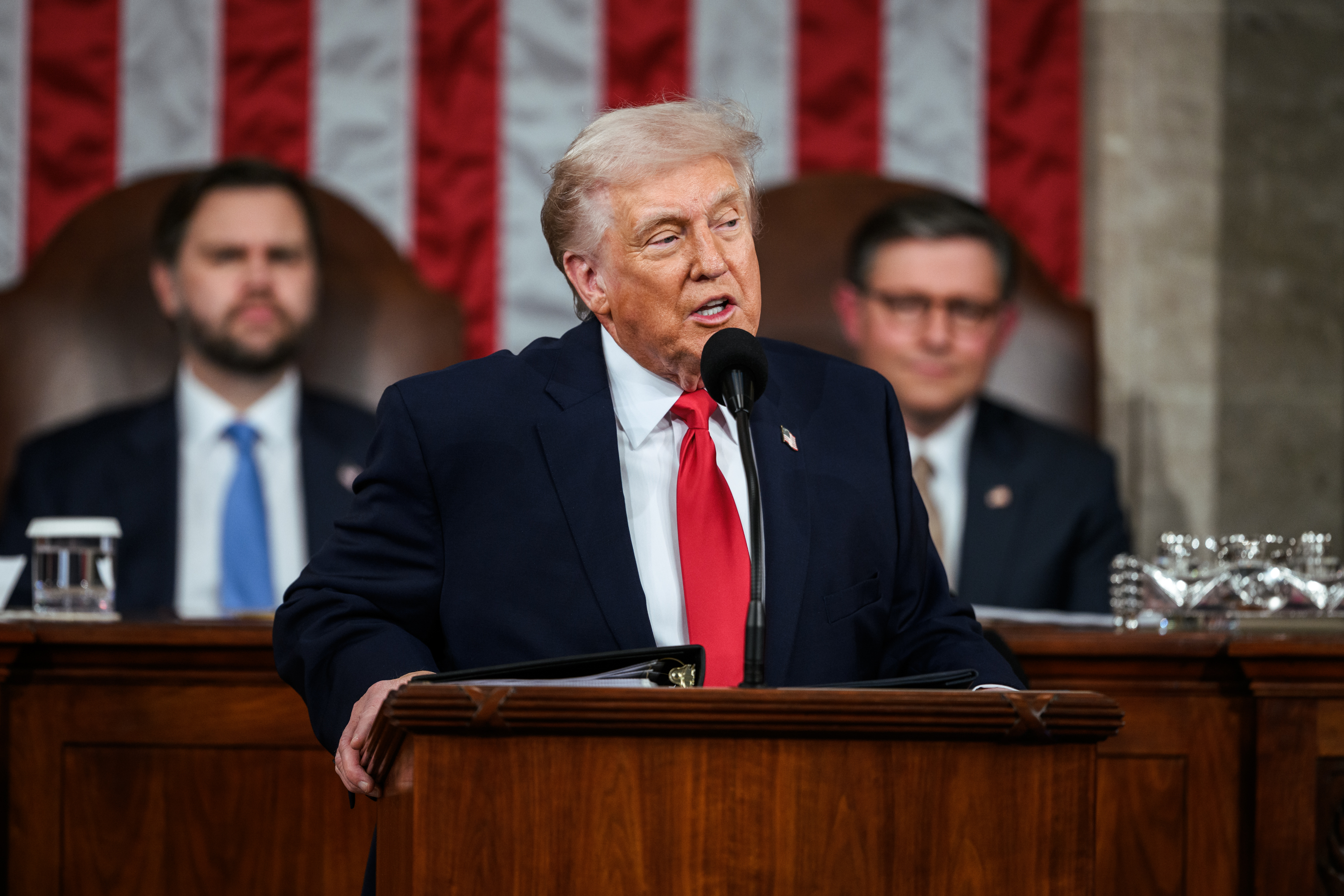
February 24: Trump's State of the Union address broke the record for the longest speech given to a joint session of Congress.

- February 24
  - Meta agrees to purchase millions of artificial intelligence chips from AMD, with AMD committing to supply up to six gigawatts of graphics processing units and issuing Meta warrants convertible into 160 million shares as part of a long-term partnership.
  - Trump delivers the first official State of the Union Address of his second term to a joint session of Congress.
- February 25 – 2026 Cuban boat incident: Cuban border guards are involved in a shoot-out with ten people on board a US-registered boat. Five of the boat's passengers are killed, and five are injured.
- February 26 – The Kansas Legislature suspends the driver licenses of all transgender residents, overriding a veto from Governor Laura Kelly.
- February 27
  - An extra-governmental group is reportedly working with the Trump administration to draft an executive order which would declare a national emergency and give the Trump administration extended powers over the administration of the 2026 United States elections. Trump denies his knowledge of the existence of such an executive order.
  - Anthropic rejects a Pentagon request to loosen security safeguards on the Claude large language model for potential use in mass surveillance and autonomous weapons systems. In response, Trump orders federal agencies to stop using Anthropic's technology, and OpenAI signs a deal with the Department of Defense.
- February 28
  - Iran war: The U.S. and Israel launch attacks on cities in Iran, and assassinate Iran's Supreme Leader Ali Khamenei. Iran launches retaliatory strikes against U.S. and Israeli military bases in the Gulf, with explosions reported in Bahrain, Iraq, Kuwait, Oman, Qatar, Saudi Arabia, and the United Arab Emirates, as well as additional spillover in Jordan and Syria.
  - Iran war protests
    - Anti-war protests are held in cities such as New York City, Portland, and Philadelphia.
    - In Washington DC, anti-war protests organized by groups such as 50501 and Code Pink are held near the White House. Additionally, diaspora protests are held near the World War I Memorial with demonstrators holding American and Israeli flags praising the strikes.
    - An anti-war protest is held in Los Angeles at the City Hall to call for an end to American military actions in the Middle East. American actress and activist Jane Fonda takes part in the protest.

=== March ===
- March 1
  - 2026 Austin bar shooting: Four people are killed, including the perpetrator, and 15 others are injured in a mass shooting at a bar in Austin, Texas. The FBI investigates the attack as potential terrorism, with the possible motive being linked to the U.S. strikes on Iran.
  - 2026 attack on the United States consulate in Karachi: In Karachi, Pakistan, protesters supportive of the Iranian government attempt to storm the U.S. consulate. The Marine Security Guard opens fire, killing several protesters.
- March 2
  - The U.S. military reports that three of its fighter jets crashed in Kuwait due to an "apparent friendly fire incident," but all six crew members ejected safely.
  - Iran strikes the American embassy in Saudi Arabia.
- March 3
  - Six U.S. soldiers are reported to have died when an "unmanned aircraft system" evaded air defenses to hit a command centre in Port Shuaiba, Kuwait. These are the first American troops killed in the Iran War.
  - Trump orders Treasury Secretary Bessent to "cut off all dealings" with Spain, after Spain refuses to grant the U.S. permission to use jointly operated bases to continue its attacks in Iran.
- March 4 – Defense Secretary Hegseth announces that a U.S. submarine has sunk an Iranian naval frigate in the Indian Ocean with a single Mark 48 torpedo, the first such sinking of an enemy ship since World War II. The Sri Lankan navy reports the IRIS Dena went down in the Indian Ocean, with 140 people on board missing. On the same day, the U.S. House Ethics Committee launches a formal investigation into Tony Gonzales.
- March 4–5 – The Senate and House of Representatives reject War Powers Resolutions to halt Trump's actions in the 2026 Iran War without congressional approval.
- March 5–17 – The 2026 World Baseball Classic is held in the United States, including Puerto Rico, as well as in Japan. The championship game is held at LoanDepot Park in Miami.

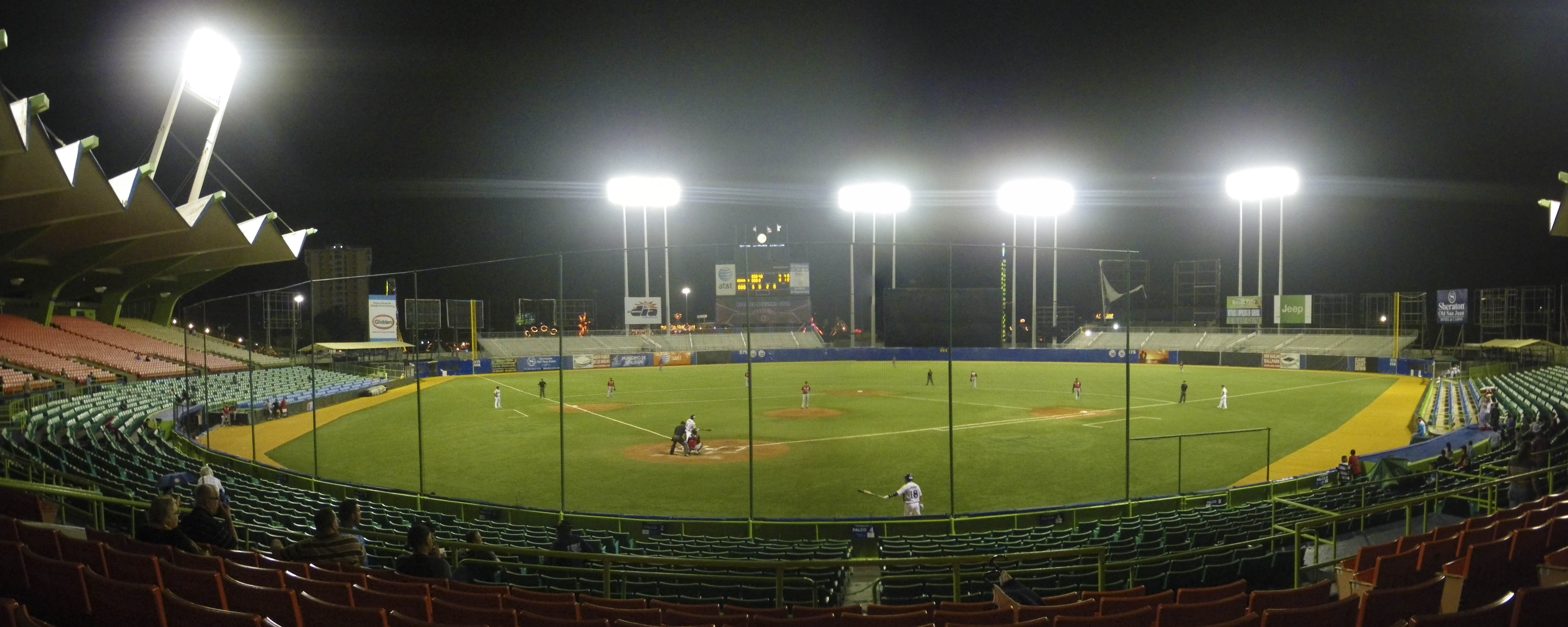
March 5: The 2026 World Baseball Classic opens at Hiram Bithorn Stadium in Puerto Rico, with Venezuela eventually winning the tournament.

- March 5
  - Trump appoints DHS Secretary Noem as the "Special Envoy for The Shield of the Americas," a security initiative focusing on the Western Hemisphere. Trump nominates U.S. Senator Markwayne Mullin to replace Noem as DHS Secretary.
  - The Pentagon officially designates artificial intelligence company Anthropic a supply chain risk – the first time the government has given this label to a domestic firm. Anthropic states it will challenge the decision in court.
- March 6 – Virginia passes legislation to prohibit schools from teaching about falsehoods of the January 6 United States Capitol attack.
- March 7 – Trump hosts the first Shield of the Americas summit in Doral, Florida, with 12 Latin American countries in attendance.
- Mach 10 – U.S. federal judge Sarah D. Morrison rules that the prediction market Kalshi constitutes as gambling and must adhere to state gambling regulations.
- March 11 – 2026 Minab school attack: A preliminary inquiry finds that the U.S. is at fault for an airstrike which killed 168–180 people at a girls' only elementary school in Minab, Iran.
- March 12
  - Temple Israel synagogue attack: A suspected attacker is killed after a vehicle rams into a synagogue in West Bloomfield, Michigan, and travels "with purpose down the hall of the building".
  - 2026 Old Dominion University shooting: A former National Guardsman opens fire at an ROTC class at Old Dominion University in Norfolk, Virginia, killing the instructor and injuring two cadets. Cadets subdue the shooter, with one fatally stabbing him.
  - CNN reports that the Pentagon and National Security Council significantly underestimated Iran's willingness to close the Strait of Hormuz in response to U.S. military strikes while planning the ongoing operation.

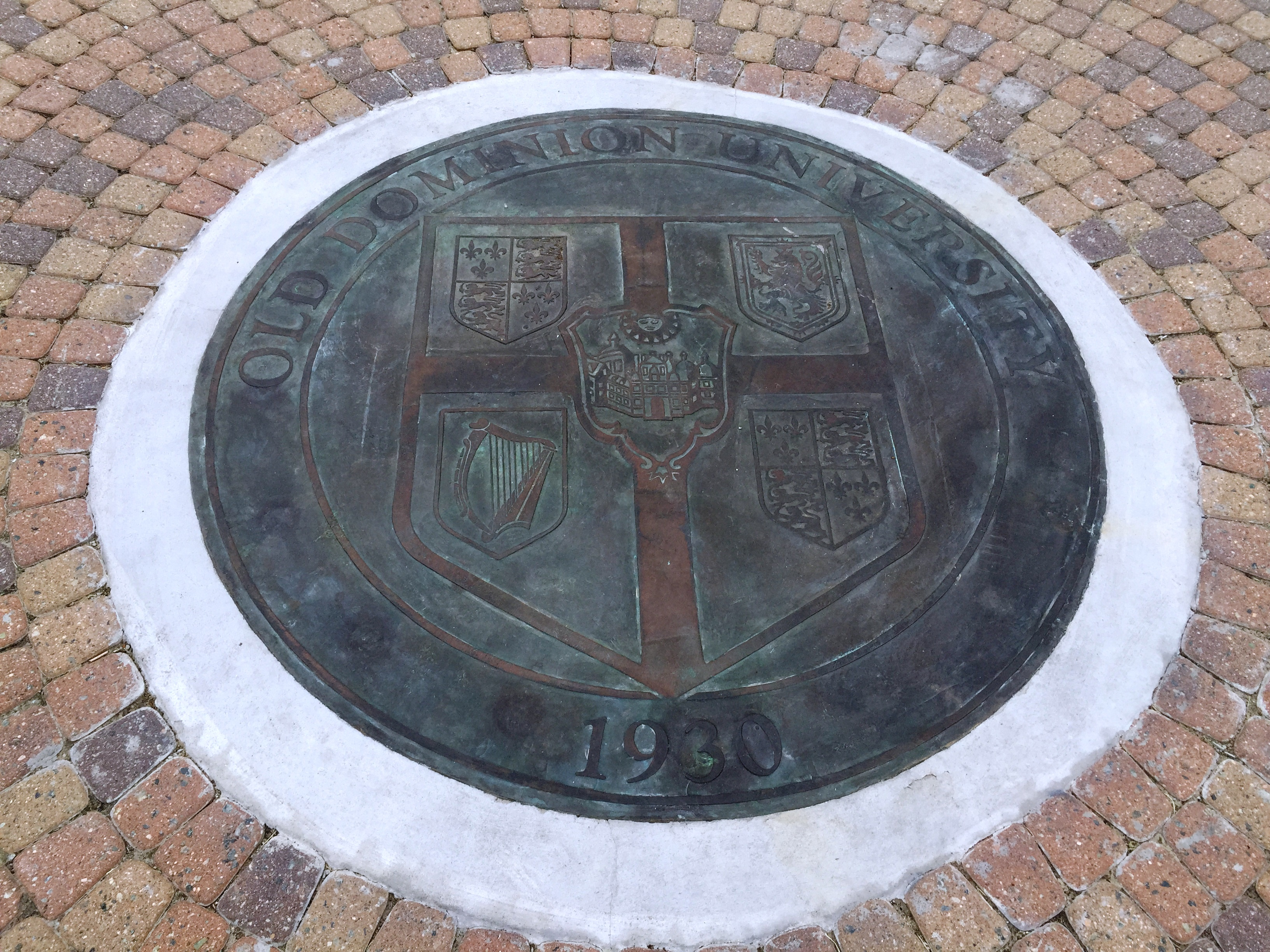
March 12: A former National Guardsman kills three ROTC members at Old Dominion University in Norfolk, Virginia.

- March 13
  - The Trump administration announces an expanded trade probe and investigations into Canada and 60 other countries.
  - NBC News reports that an additional 5,000 U.S. troops along with more warships are to be deployed to the Middle East, following a request by CENTCOM.
- March 14 – Trump announces that U.S. forces have "totally obliterated" all military targets on Kharg Island, which handles the vast majority of Iran's oil exports.
- March 15 – The 98th Academy Awards are held at the Dolby Theatre in Los Angeles, honoring the best films released in 2025. One Battle After Another wins the Academy Award for Best Picture.
- March 16
  - A federal judge blocks the CDC's Advisory Committee on Immunization Practices changes to vaccine policy, including revisions to the childhood immunization schedule. The judge rules that the policy changes were arbitrary and capricious and that HHS Secretary Kennedy illegally fired and replaced committee members.
  - Trump urges allied countries to assist in securing and reopening the Strait of Hormuz following its effective closure by Iran.
- March 17
  - Joe Kent resigns as director of the National Counterterrorism Center, citing disagreement over American involvement in the Iran war.
  - Trump criticizes NATO and other U.S. allies, saying he's been told they "don't want to get involved" in the Iran war.
  - Arizona Attorney General Kris Mayes files the first criminal charges against Kalshi, alleging that the prediction market is hosting illegal gambling and breaking state law by betting on elections.
- March 18
  - 2026 Minab school attack: Win Without War protestors display children's backpacks on Capitol Hill in protest of the Minab elementary school airstrike that killed 160 children. Several Democrats from Congress attend the protest.
  - The highest March temperature ever recorded in the U.S. occurs, reaching 109 °F (43 °C) near Martinez Lake, Arizona, amid a particularly strong heatwave across the south and southwest. The record is broken again on March 20, reaching 112 °F (44.4 °C).
- March 19 – The Pentagon seeks $200 billion in additional funds for the Iran war.
- March 20
  - A jury in California rules that Elon Musk misled Twitter investors before his $44 billion purchase of the company in 2022.
  - A Nevada court rules that Kalshi cannot operate in the state without obtaining a gaming license from the Nevada Gaming Commission.
- March 21
  - Trump issues a warning that if Iran does not fully reopen the Strait of Hormuz within 48 hours, Washington will "hit and obliterate" the country's power plants, starting with the largest.
  - An anti-war protest is held in Philadelphia to call for U.S. Senators John Fetterman and Dave McCormick to bring an end to the war.
  - In the NCAA Tournament, 11th seed Texas upsets 3rd seed Gonzaga in the Round of 32 to reach the Sweet Sixteen, becoming the first team to go from the First Four to the Sweet Sixteen since the UCLA Bruins did so in 2021.
- March 22 – Air Canada Express Flight 8646: Two pilots are killed and more than 40 passengers injured when a Bombardier CRJ700 collides with a firetruck while attempting to cross a runway at LaGuardia Airport, New York.
- March 23
  - Trump announces a postponement of U.S. strikes against Iranian power plants after what he calls "productive" negotiations. However, Iran's foreign ministry denies that such talks have taken place.
  - 2026 United States federal government shutdowns: ICE agents are sent to airports to assist TSA agents who are without pay.
  - A jury in California finds that Bill Cosby is liable for raping a woman by the name of Donna Motsinger in 1972 and awards $19 million in damages to her.
  - The Trump administration announces that it will pay $1 billion to French company TotalEnergies to cancel planned offshore wind farms in the Atlantic and instead pursue fossil fuel projects.
- March 24
  - The U.S. Senate confirms Markwayne Mullin as the 9th DHS Secretary in a 54–45 vote. Secretary Mullin is the first member of the Cherokee Nation to serve in the U.S. Cabinet.
  - Former Kentucky governor Matt Bevin is held in contempt of court and is sentenced to either 60 days in prison or a $500 fine.
  - Democrat Emily Gregory wins a special election to represent the 87th House district of Florida which contains Mar-a-Lago.
- March 25
  - Expansion of the NBA: The National Basketball Association Board of Governors approve a vote to explore expansion bids in Las Vegas and Seattle.
  - A jury in California finds that Meta and YouTube are liable for social media addiction.
  - Iran dismisses a peace plan proposed by the U.S., calling the demands "excessive". The White House warns Iran that Donald Trump will "ensure they are hit harder than ever before" if the country refuses to accept defeat.
  - The U.S. Supreme Court unanimously holds that internet service providers are not liable for the copyright infringement of their users if the ISP did not intend its services to be used for infringement.
  - Trump signs an executive order requiring proof of U.S. citizenship for voter registration.

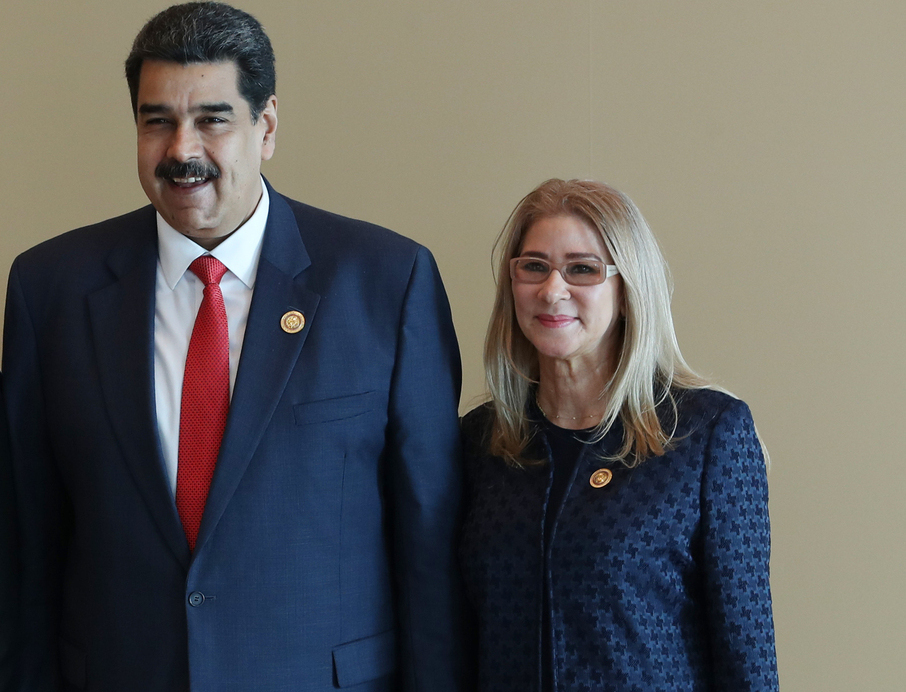
March 26: Former Venezuelan president Nicolás Maduro and his wife Cilia Flores appear in a NY federal court for their hearing on charges of narcoterrorism and weapons offenses.

- March 26
  - Nicolás Maduro and his wife Cilia Flores appear in a New York federal court for their latest hearing, faced with charges of narcoterrorism and weapons offenses.
  - Treasury Secretary Bessent announces that Trump's signature will appear on U.S. paper currency, the first time a sitting president's signature will appear instead of the Treasurer and Secretary of the Treasury.
- March 27
  - A House Ethics Committee panel finds that Florida Democratic Representative Sheila Cherfilus-McCormick committed ethics violations in misappropriating federal disaster money for her re-election campaign.
  - A federal appeals court overturns a $16.1 billion judgment against Argentina over their nationalization of oil firm YPF.
- March 28
  - Protests against Donald Trump: The third No Kings protests are held in all 50 U.S. states against the policies of Trump and his administration including the Iran war, ICE operations, and the January shootings of Renée Good and Alex Pretti.
  - In the NCAA Tournament, the Arizona Wildcats reach the Final Four for the first time since 2001. Additionally, Illinois reaches the Final Four for the first time since 2005.
  - 3,500 U.S. troops arrive in the Middle East with the USS Tripoli (LHA-7), as strikes between Israel and Iran continue.
- March 30 – Trump and his son Eric unveil the plans for Trump's presidential library in Miami, Florida, at the Miami Dade College campus. Trump plans for the library to also be a hotel.
- March 31
  - AAA reports the average price of gas in the United States has risen to $4 a gallon for the first time since 2022.
  - Trump signs an executive order directing DHS to create voter lists and USPS to mail ballots only to people on the list.
  - A federal judge rules that Trump's Executive Order 14290 barring federal funding for NPR and PBS violates the First Amendment.
  - The U.S. Supreme Court rules 8–1 that talk therapy used in conversion therapy is protected speech under the First Amendment and orders lower courts to apply strict scrutiny to a Colorado law banning conversion therapy on minors. This ruling potentially strikes down existing restrictions on conversion therapy in the U.S.

=== April ===
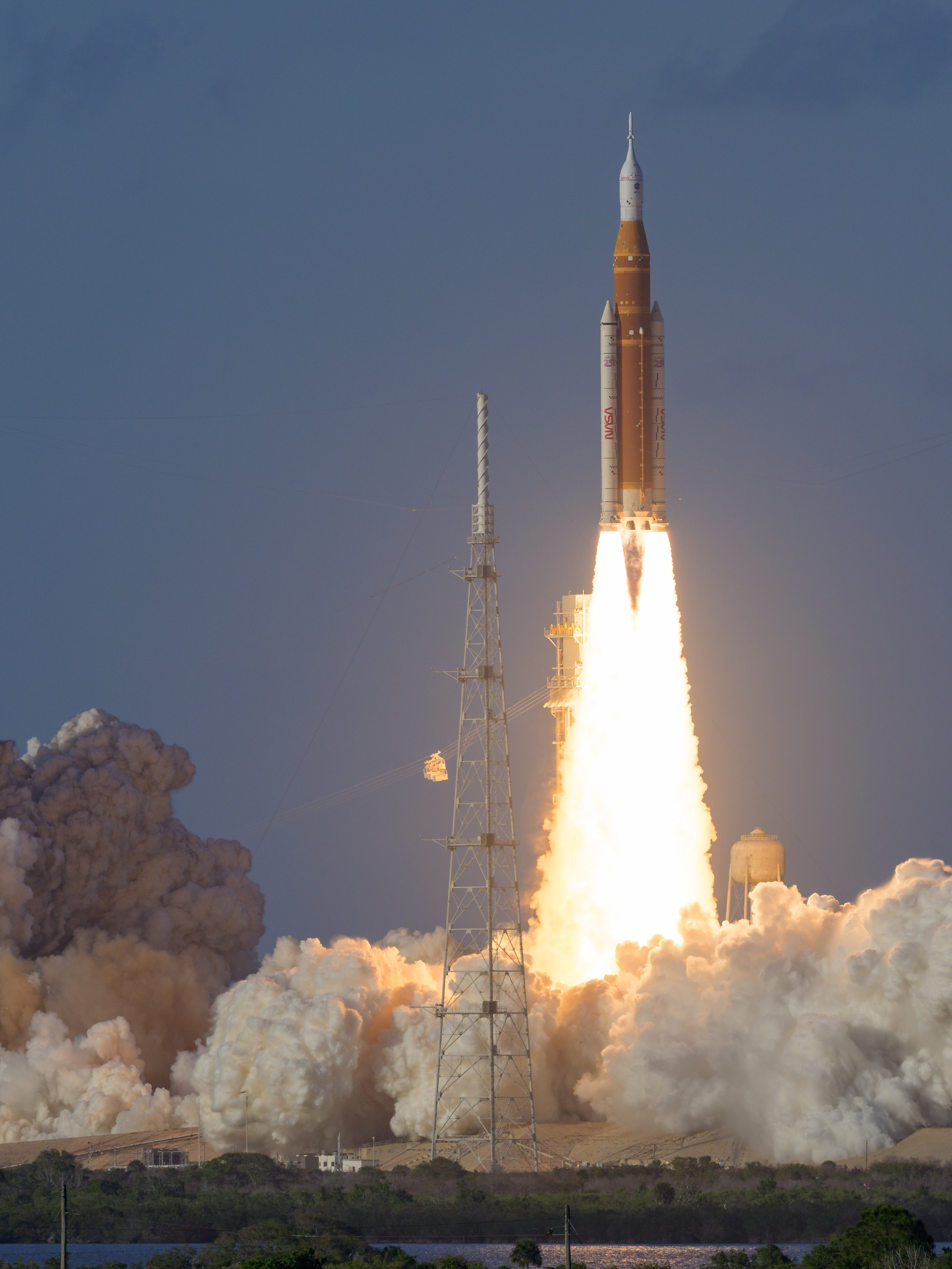
April 1: Artemis II blasts off to the Moon, carrying a crew of four.

The University of Michigan Index of Consumer Sentiment reached a record low in April 2026 (after at least 50 years of data).

- April 1
  - Trump says US military action in Iran could end in "two to three weeks", and that the US will "leave whether we have a deal or not" once he's certain Iran cannot build a nuclear weapon "for years".
  - NASA launches the Artemis II lunar flyby mission from the Kennedy Space Center in Florida, the first crewed flight beyond low Earth orbit since Apollo 17 in 1972. With a crew of four astronauts – Reid Wiseman (commander) Victor Glover (pilot), Christina Koch (mission specialist), and Canadian astronaut Jeremy Hansen (mission specialist) – it also becomes the first time a person of color, a woman, and a non-United States citizen have left low Earth orbit.
  - The Supreme Court hears oral arguments over the constitutionality of Trump's Executive Order 14160 ending birthright citizenship. Trump is in attendance, a first for a sitting president.
  - The DOJ publishes an opinion that the Presidential Records Act is an unconstitutional overreach of congressional power, and advises Trump that he can refuse to hand over records to the National Archives and Records Administration at the end of his term.
- April 2
  - Trump fires Attorney General Pam Bondi, who is replaced by Todd Blanche in an acting capacity.
  - Defense Secretary Hegseth fires three high-ranking U.S. Army generals: Chief Staff Randy George, Chief of Chaplins William Green Jr., and T2COM Commander David Hodne. The Pentagon did not provide a reason.
  - The Colorado Court of Appeals vacates the nine-year sentence of 2020 election denier Tina Peters on First Amendment free speech grounds and remands the case for resentencing.
- April 3 – A United States Air Force F-15E Strike Eagle is shot down over Iran during combat operations. Both crew members are later rescued. During the rescue mission, an A-10 Thunderbolt II is also hit and crashes, though its pilot ejects safely and is recovered.
- April 4 – 2025–26 NHL season: In ice hockey, the Buffalo Sabres clinched the Stanley Cup playoffs for the first time since the 2010–11 season, ending their 14-year Stanley Cup playoff drought.
- April 5 – The 2026 NCAA Division I women's basketball championship game is held at the Mortgage Matchup Center in Phoenix, Arizona, in which the UCLA Bruins beat the South Carolina Gamecocks 79–51 to win their first title.
- April 6
  - The crew of Artemis II breaks the record for the furthest humans have ever been from Earth, reaching a maximum distance of 252,757 miles (406,773 km) as they travel around the far side of the Moon.
  - The Supreme Court vacates a federal appeals court ruling that upheld former Trump advisor Steve Bannon's criminal conviction for contempt of Congress for defying a subpoena from the January 6th Committee. The DOJ moves to formally dismiss Bannon's convictions.
  - The 2026 NCAA Division I men's basketball championship game is held at Lucas Oil Stadium in Indianapolis, in which the Michigan Wolverines beat the UConn Huskies 69–63 to win their second title and first since 1989.
- April 7
  - Iran war
    - Trump warns that "a whole civilization will die tonight, never to be brought back again" unless Iran reaches a deal on reopening the Strait of Hormuz, and sets a deadline of 20:00 EDT.
    - Following Trump's threat to "end its civilization", Democrats and former Republican congresswoman Marjorie Taylor Greene call for the invocation of the 25th amendment of the United States Constitution. Additionally, Democrats call for Trump to be impeached.
    - Trump announces a two-week ceasefire that was mediated via Pakistan. He agrees to "suspend the bombing and attacks on Iran for a period of two weeks", subject to Iran agreeing to the "complete, immediate and safe opening" of the Strait of Hormuz, and to allow time for an agreement to be reached.
  - Assistant District Attorney Clay Fuller, a Trump-endorsed Republican, wins the special election in Georgia to replace Marjorie Taylor Greene, who resigned in January following a public fallout with Trump.
  - Judge Chris Taylor, the Democratic-backed candidate, wins election to the Wisconsin Supreme Court. The result expands the court's liberal majority to 5–2.
  - AI firm Anthropic announces a new model for its Claude language model, named Mythos, designed for locating cybersecurity vulnerabilities and debugging.
- April 8
  - Trump threatens 50% tariffs on countries who distribute weapons to Iran.
  - Gilgo Beach serial killings: Rex Heuermann pleas guilty to killing eight women between 1993 and 2010 on Long Island.
  - Jasveen Sangha is sentenced to 15 years in federal prison for distributing ketamine that resulted in the death of Friends actor Matthew Perry in 2023.
- April 9
  - The DNC votes against a resolution to limit AIPAC influence.
  - Melania Trump delivers a rare public statement at the White House denying any connection to Jeffrey Epstein and his associate Ghislaine Maxwell. She calls allegations linking her to Epstein "lies" and urges Congress to hold public hearings for survivors of Epstein's sex trafficking.
  - The FBI launches an antitrust investigation into the NFL.
- April 10
  - Iran war: U.S. inflation rises to 3.3% year-on-year in March, a two-year high, driven by higher energy and goods prices linked to disruptions caused by the Iran war.
  - Artemis II successfully returns to Earth, splashing down safely in the Pacific Ocean near San Diego. The four crew members are extracted from the capsule and taken by helicopter to the USS John P Murtha.
- April 11
  - Iran and the United States hold ceasefire talks in Islamabad, Pakistan, making it the first highest-level engagement between the two countries since the Iranian Revolution in 1979. The U.S. delegation is led by Vance.
  - The U.S. Central Command has confirmed that the U.S. Navy Arleigh Burke-class destroyers USS Frank Peterson and USS Michael Murphy have crossed the Strait of Hormuz to ensure the strait is clear of sea mines.
  - A probe against Eric Swalwell over the sexual assault allegations against him is launched by the Manhattan District Attorney.
- April 12
  - Rory McIlroy wins the Masters Tournament for the second straight year, the first golfer to do so since Tiger Woods in 2001–02.
  - Eric Swalwell suspends his California gubernatorial campaign after four women accuse him of sexual assault and harassment.
  - Jacksonville Sheriff's Office police officer and pastor Antonio Richardson rescues a man who attempted to jump off the Dames Point Bridge in Jacksonville, Florida.
- April 13
  - The United States begins a naval blockade of Iran amid the Strait of Hormuz crisis.
  - Eric Swalwell (D-CA14) and Tony Gonzales (R-TX23) resign from Congress following sexual misconduct allegations.
  - A federal judge dismisses Trump's $10 billion defamation lawsuit against The Wall Street Journal over articles linking him to Jeffrey Epstein's birthday book because Trump failed to plausibly allege "actual malice".
- April 15 – John Eastman is disbarred in California for his role in attempting to overturn the 2020 presidential election.
- April 16
  - Justin Fairfax, the former Lieutenant Governor of Virginia (2018–2022), murders his wife Cerina while their two kids are present, before committing suicide.
  - The Trump administration cancels $73 million in funding for New York for failing to vet foreign truck drivers.
  - The DOJ opens an investigation against Eric Swalwell.
  - Singer D4vd is arrested as the main suspect of the death of Celeste Rivas Hernandez.
  - The U.S. completes the withdrawal of their armed forces from Syria after being in the country since 2014.
- April 17
  - A federal appeals court allows the Trump administration to continue construction on the White House ballroom until at least June, in response to a lower court injunction ruling that the president requires congressional approval for the ballroom.
  - Liz Conmy, a member of the North Dakota House of Representatives, dies in a plane crash in Brooklyn Park, Minnesota.
- April 18 – Reactions to the Iran War: During the Coachella festival, The Strokes denounce the US-Israel strikes against Iran and accuse the Central Intelligence Agency of using violence to promote regime change while performing Oblivius.
- April 19 – Eight children are killed and two other people are injured in a mass shooting at multiple locations in Shreveport, Louisiana. The perpetrator is killed by police.
- April 20
  - Labor Secretary Lori Chavez-DeRemer resigns amid abuse of power allegations. Keith E. Sonderling becomes the acting Secretary of Labor.
  - Around 62 U.S. military veterans are arrested by the U.S. Capitol Police inside the United States Capitol in Washington, D.C. during a protest against the Iran war after occupying the Cannon House Office Building. Among those arrested are Center on Conscience & War executive director Mike Prysner and client Tyler Romero.
  - The Onion implements a new plan to acquire InfoWars from far-right conspiracy theorist Alex Jones after an earlier plan was rejected by a judge.
  - Tim Cook announces he will step down as Apple's CEO and become Executive Director. John Ternus is chosen as Apple's next CEO, effective September 1, 2026.
  - FBI Director Kash Patel sues The Atlantic in a $250 million defamation lawsuit over an article claiming that Patel is an alcoholic.
- April 21
  - Trump says that he extended the Iran truce to allow time for an Iranian proposal to be submitted at Pakistan's request.
  - 2026 Virginia redistricting amendment: Voters in Virginia approve a redistricting referendum aimed at boosting Democrats' chance of winning seats in the upcoming midterms.
  - The DOJ charges the Southern Poverty Law Center with defrauding donors with payments to white nationalist informants.
- April 22 – A chemical accident in Institute, West Virginia leaves two dead and 30 others injured.
- April 23
  - Trump orders the US Navy to destroy any Iranian boats laying mines in the Strait of Hormuz.
  - Acting Attorney General Todd Blanche reclassifies marijuana to a Schedule III drug.
  - Warner Bros. Discovery shareholders approve Paramount Skydance's proposed acquisition of the company in a deal valued at $111 billion including debt, moving the merger a step closer to completion pending regulatory approval.
  - A shooting at the Mall of Louisiana in Baton Rouge leaves five injured and one dead.
- April 24 – Trump fires all 24 members of the National Science Board, the body that oversees the National Science Foundation.

April 25: Suspect involved in the White House Correspondents' Dinner shooting, seen running through the security area of the Washington Hilton hotel.

- April 25
  - Trump is evacuated after a shooting occurs at the White House Correspondents' Dinner. One law enforcement officer is struck in a bullet-resistant vest and is expected to recover. A 31-year-old male suspect is subdued and taken into custody.
  - The US military announces that its strike on an alleged drug boat in the eastern Pacific killed two people.
- April 26 – 2026 NASCAR Cup Series: In NASCAR, a 26-car pileup occurs during the Jack Link's 500 at the Talladega Superspeedway after driver Bubba Wallace was pushed from outside.
- April 27
  - The suspect in the White House Correspondents' Dinner shooting is charged with attempting to assassinate the president, along with weapon offences relating to the incident at the Washington DC Hilton. He does not enter a plea.
  - King Charles and Queen Camilla arrive in the US for a state visit.
- April 28 – Former FBI director James Comey is indicted on federal charges of threatening the president. The charges are related to a post he made in May 2025, which included a photo of seashells on the beach arranged to spell "86 47".
- April 29
  - The Washington Post reports that the USS Gerald R. Ford will exit the Middle East and return to Virginia in the coming days after spending 10 months at sea.
  - Louisiana v. Callais: The Supreme Court, in a 6–3 decision, rules that Louisiana's new redistricting map was an unconstitutional racial gerrymander under the Fifteenth Amendment.
- April 30
  - Camp Mystic in Texas withdraws an application to reopen during the summer in the wake of the floods in July 2025.
  - Trump signs a bill to fund the Department of Homeland Security, the Secret Service, the Coast Guard, FEMA, TSA, and the Cybersecurity and Infrastructure Security Agency, ending a 76-day partial government shutdown.
  - In ice hockey, the Minnesota Wild defeat the Dallas Stars in six games in the 2026 Stanley Cup playoffs following a 5–2 victory to win a playoff series for the first time since 2015, ending an 11-year drought.

=== May ===
- May 1
  - Iran war: President Donald Trump notifies lawmakers in Congress that the Iran war has been "terminated" ahead of a 60-day deadline under the War Powers Resolution which military operations must halt unless lawmakers authorize military force.
  - 2026 May Day protests: May Day protests are held across the U.S., including an economic blackout as part of 3,500 "May Day Strong" events across the country. Additionally, demonstrations are held outside institutions such as the New York Stock Exchange.
  - British singer Zayn Malik cancels all U.S. concert events for his upcoming Konnakol tour after being hospitalized for an unknown illness.
- May 2
  - 2026 Kentucky Derby: In horse racing, American racehorse Golden Tempo wins the 152nd Kentucky Derby after entering the race with a 24–1 odds, making Cherie DeVaux the first female trainer to win the derby.
  - Spirit Airlines announces it has gone out of business after 34 years.
- May 3 – Iran war: President Trump announces Operation Project Freedom in an effort to secure commercial traffic across the Strait of Hormuz.
- May 4
  - Iran war:
    - The U.S. Central Command confirms the launch of Operation Project Freedom in an effort to secure commercial traffic across the Strait of Hormuz.
    - Danish shipping company Maersk reports that the Alliance Fairfax, a US-flagged vehicle carrier operated by subsidiary Farrell Lines, has successfully crossed the Strait of Hormuz accompanied by U.S. military assets as part of Project Freedom.
- May 5
  - Iran War:
    - U.S. Secretary of State Marco Rubio announces that Operation Epic Fury has concluded.
    - President Trump announces that Operation Project Freedom has been paused, citing progress in negotiations.
  - CNN hosts the California gubernatorial primary debate.
  - Vivek Ramaswamy wins the Republican nomination for the governor of Ohio.
  - Tanner Horner is sentenced to death after pleading guilty to the murder of Athena Strand, a 7-year-old girl he took from her Texas home while delivering a Christmas gift.
- May 6
  - Iran war: Amid negotiations over the Strait of Hormuz crisis, President Trump says that the U.S. and Israeli war against Iran could end if Iran accepts a U.S. proposal, but warns that bombing would resume at "a much higher level and intensity" if it rejects the terms. Iran says it is reviewing the proposal.
  - Former collegiate American football quarterback Stephen Garcia, who played for the University of South Carolina, announces he has been diagnosed with stage IV colorectal cancer.
- May 7 – The U.S. Department of State along with other federal agencies orders an investigation of all 53 Mexican consulates throughout the country. The Trump administration accuses former Mexican President Andrés Manuel López Obrador of utilizing Mexican consulates in the U.S. to monitor political activities.
- May 8
  - Tariffs in the second Trump administration: The U.S. Court of International Trade rules that the 10% global tariffs imposed by Trump are illegal.
  - In college basketball, the NCAA Division I men's and women's tournaments will expand to 76 teams beginning next year.
  - The Pentagon releases declassified documents about UFOs and extraterrestrial life.
- May 10 – Six people are found dead inside a boxcar on a Union Pacific freight train in Laredo, Texas.
- May 12
  - 2025–2026 United States redistricting: The Republican-led South Carolina Senate rejects redistricting efforts to redraw the congressional districts in South Carolina, including efforts to eliminate the seat represented by congressman Jim Clyburn.
  - American autonomous driving technology company Waymo recalls 3,800 robotaxis over risks that they could enter flooded areas.

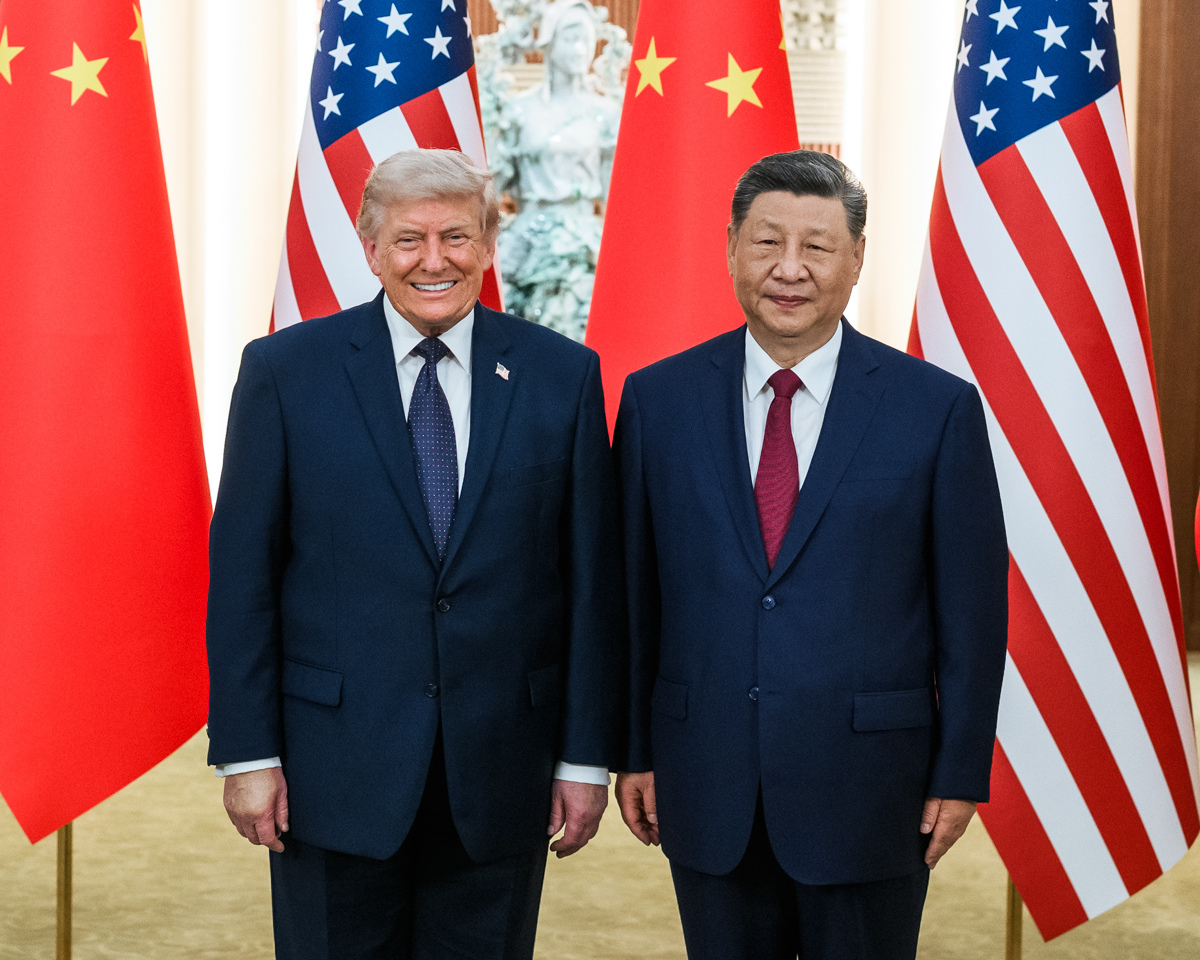
May 14: President Trump meets with General Secretary of the Chinese Communist Party Xi Jinping in Beijing.

- May 13–15 – President Trump makes a state visit to China and meets with Chinese leader Xi Jinping.
- May 13 – The U.S. Senate confirms Kevin Warsh as the Chair of the Federal Reserve in a 54–45 vote. Warsh will succeed Jerome Powell at the end of the latter's term.
- May 14
  - Federal employees sue USDA and Secretary Brooke Rollins on First Amendment grounds over proselytizing Christian messaging in work emails.
  - Mike Banks resigns as U.S. Border Patrol Chief, saying he wanted to spend time with family. Bank's resignation came weeks after the Washington Examiner alleged that he engaged in sex tourism in Colombia and Thailand.
- May 16 – 2026 Long Island Rail Road strike: Five unions representing over 3,500 workers for the Long Island Rail Road, the largest commuter rail system in North America, go on strike to negotiate a new contract with the Metropolitan Transportation Authority in New York City.
- May 18 – Five people, including two gunmen, are killed in a mass shooting at a mosque in San Diego, California.
- May 18–19 – The DOJ announces they reached a settlement with the Internal Revenue Service to resolve Trump's $10 billion lawsuit regarding the 2020 leak of his tax returns to The New York Times. Trump drops the lawsuit but will receive a $1.776 billion "anti-weaponization fund" to give to people who were prosecuted by the Biden administration. A day later, the DOJ reveals that the settlement terms include that the IRS is "forever barred and precluded" from investigating past tax returns filed by President Trump, his family and his businesses.
- May 19 – U.S. Representative Thomas Massie loses the Republican primary for his congressional seat in Kentucky to Trump-endorsed Ed Gallrein. Massie is one of the most prominent Republican critics of the Trump administration. The race is the most expensive U.S. House primary in American history, with over $32 million spent in ad spending.
- May 20
  - The U.S. House of Representatives passes the 21st Century ROAD to Housing Act in a 396–13 vote, a legislation aimed at helping the cost-of-living and housing in the United States.
  - Two U.S. Capitol Police officers who helped defend the Capitol building during the January 6, 2021 riot file a lawsuit to block January 6 rioters from receiving payouts from a $1.776 billion settlement fund.
  - MV Hondius hantavirus outbreak: American passengers quarantined in Nebraska following exposure to the hantavirus on MV Hondius, including a North Carolina resident, will remain in quarantine until the end of May.
  - Vanessa Trump, ex-wife of Donald Trump's son Donald Trump Jr., announces that she has been diagnosed with breast cancer.
  - U.S. doctor Peter Stafford who contracted Ebola in DRC is flown to Germany for treatment.
  - The DOJ indicts former First Secretary of the Communist Party of Cuba Raúl Castro for crimes related to the 1996 shootdown of Brothers to the Rescue aircraft.
- May 21
  - DNC chair Ken Martin releases the full autopsy report into the Democratic Party's defeat in the 2024 U.S. presidential election, including criticism into the presidential campaign of then-US Vice President Kamala Harris.
  - West Nile virus in the United States: Texas reports its first case of West Nile virus of 2026 in Harris County.
  - A chemical leak at a GKN Aerospace plant tank in Garden Grove, California, forces over 40,000 residents to evacuate due to the risk of methyl methacrylate leaking into the surrounding areas or the tank exploding.
  - CBS airs the final episode of Stephen Colbert's Late Show. CBS's official reason for cancelling Colbert's show last July was financial difficulties, but commentators believe it was due to pressure from the Trump administration over Colbert's frequent criticisms. Trump posts an AI-generated video on Truth Social depicting him throwing Colbert into a garbage dumpster.
- May 22
  - Tulsi Gabbard resigns as Director of National Intelligence, citing her husband's recent bone cancer diagnosis. According to a source familiar with her departure, she was compelled to leave by the White House.
  - Trump announces he will posthumously award Welles Crowther the Presidential Medal of Freedom for his heroism and sacrifice during the 9/11 attacks. Crowther is widely remembered as the "The Man in the Red Bandana".
  - The Department of Homeland Security announces that people with temporary visas must return to their home countries to apply for green cards.
  - Federal judge Waverly Crenshaw dismisses DOJ criminal charges filed against Kilmar Abrego Garcia for human smuggling, ruling that DOJ's allegations was retaliation for his successful lawsuit challenging his deportation to El Salvador.
- May 23
  - May 2026 White House shooting: A gunman opens fire at a security booth outside the White House complex in Washington, D.C., before being fatally shot by the Secret Service. A bystander is also injured and is in critical condition.
  - Hasan Piker and Medea Benjamin are subpoenaed by US officials over their Cuban trip.
- May 24 – At least 19 people are injured in Atlantic Beach, South Carolina, during a stampede at an annual motorcycle rally.
- May 25
  - Iran war:
    - Trump honors the 13 servicemembers who were killed during the Operation Epic Fury phase of the Iran war at Arlington National Cemetery on Memorial Day.
    - The US Central Command reports "self-defense" strikes on Iran, saying that the ceasefire is still in place, with several Iranian soldiers reportedly killed. According to Iranian sources, prior to the US attacks, the Iranian military targeted a ship at sea.
  - 2026 NBA playoffs: In basketball, the New York Knicks eliminate the Cleveland Cavaliers in four games with a 130–93 victory at Rocket Arena in Cleveland, Ohio, to win the NBA Eastern Conference and advance to the 2026 NBA Finals, their first appearance in the NBA Finals since 1999. They will face the winner of the Western Conference finals between the Oklahoma City Thunder and San Antonio Spurs.
- May 26
  - 2028 United States presidential election: American television writer Dan Greaney announces that he will run for the Republican nomination to succeed incumbent U.S. president Donald Trump in 2028.
  - The South Carolina Senate rejects a redistricting effort to eliminate the state's single majority-Black district, held by Democrat U.S. Representative Jim Clyburn, before the upcoming U.S. midterms.
  - Joe Biden sues the DOJ to block the release of private audio recordings with his biographer Mark Zwonitzer for the 2017 memoir, Promise Me, Dad. The recordings were obtained during Special Counsel Robert Hur's probe into Biden's handling of classified documents after his vice presidency.
  - The DOJ charges Michele Spagnuolo, a Google engineer, with breaking federal insider trading laws because of $2.7 million in bets related to Google he placed on Polymarket, a prediction market, between October and December 2025.
- May 27
  - The American Cancer Society announces that blood tests will be included for colorectal cancer screenings amidst a rise in colon cancer in young adults. The recommendations also reaffirm that screenings should begin at age 45.
  - Former U.S. Attorney General Pam Bondi is diagnosed with thyroid cancer.
  - CNN reports that the DOJ opened a criminal investigation into E. Jean Carroll, accusing her of perjury during her defamation and sexual abuse lawsuit against Trump.
  - Meta launches paid subscriptions plans for Facebook, Instagram and WhatsApp.
- May 28
  - Axios reports that U.S. and Iran negotiators have reached a ceasefire extension deal, pending Trump's approval.
  - At least three people are killed, four others are injured, and 11 more are reported missing in an explosion at an apartment building in Dallas, Texas.
  - Former CIA official David Rush is accused of stealing $40 million of gold bars.
  - CBS News editor-in-chief Bari Weiss appoints former New York Times journalist Nick Bilton as the executive director of 60 Minutes, following a series of firings on 60 Minutes staff amid pressure from the Trump administration.
  - The White House launches aliens.gov, an extraterrestrial-themed website that lambasts illegal immigration in the U.S.
- May 29
  - Federal judge Leonie Brinkema blocks the distribution of the Trump administration's $1.8 billion anti-weaponization fund while lawsuits are being litigated.
  - Federal judge Christopher R. Cooper orders the Trump administration to reopen the Kennedy Center and remove Trump's name from it, ruling that congressional approval is required.
  - In ice hockey, the Carolina Hurricanes beat the Montreal Canadiens in five games during the Eastern Conference Finals to advance to the 2026 Stanley Cup finals, making it their first appearance in the Stanley Cup since 2006.
- May 30
  - The San Antonio Spurs defeat the defending champions, the Oklahoma City Thunder, in seven games to win the Western Conference finals and reach the NBA Finals for the first time since 2014, where they will face the New York Knicks.
  - The U.S. Southern Command announces that it conducted a strike on a vessel in the eastern Pacific, killing three male "narco-terrorists".
  - Trump names himself as the headliner for the "Great American State Fair" semiquincentennial event, organized by Freedom 250, in Washington D.C., after several artists pull out over concerns that the event became politicized by Trump. Martina McBride, Young MC, Bret Michaels, and the Commodores were among the artists who pulled out. A revised lineup includes artists such as Flo Rida, Milli Vanilli, and Vanilla Ice.
- May 31 – The National Basketball Association announces that the logo for the Larry O'Brien Championship Trophy will be displayed on the basketball courts of Frost Bank Center in San Antonio, Texas, and Madison Square Garden in New York City for the upcoming NBA Finals between the San Antonio Spurs and New York Knicks, making it the first time the logo decal will be placed on the NBA court during the NBA Finals since 2009.

=== June ===
- June 1
  - Florida Attorney General James Uthmeier files a lawsuit in state court against OpenAI, accusing ChatGPT of security lapses that promoted violent conduct. This lawsuit is the first to be filed by a state against ChatGPT.
  - The Trump administration announces that it will walk away from a $1.8 billion "anti-weaponization" fund amid pushback from GOP members of Congress, including majority leader John Thune, and a lingering court battle demanding an explanation for the arrangement. However, acting Attorney General Blanche clarifies that the IRS is still barred from auditing Trump's previous tax records.
  - U.S. spending on data center construction is reported to have reached $50.7 billion in April 2026, surpassing public construction spending on transportation structures for the first time.
  - Axios reports that Trump yelled at Benjamin Netanyahu over Israel's escalation in Lebanon amid a ceasefire, which threatened the U.S.-Iran negotiations to end the Iran War. Trump allegedly told Netanyahu, "You're fucking crazy. You'd be in prison if it weren't for me. I'm saving your ass. Everybody hates you now. Everybody hates Israel because of this." Trump later confirms he had called Netanyahu "crazy".
  - CBS News fires 60 Minutes journalist Scott Pelley after he criticizes the new leadership during a meeting.
  - The DC Court of Appeals rules in a split decision that the Trump administration's ban on transgender individuals from serving in the U.S. military is likely unconstitutional. The court's decision protects active service members from being dismissed, but doesn't abolish the ban on recruitment.
- June 2
  - The U.S. Supreme Court allows Alabama to redistrict its congressional map for the upcoming midterm elections. The new map favors the Republican Party.
  - Trump names businessman Bill Pulte as the acting Director of National Intelligence, replacing Tulsi Gubbard who resigned.
  - The New York Times reports that the DOJ is investigating former U.S. Representative George Santos for insider trading on Kalshi by betting on himself that he would not show up to the 2026 State of the Union Address.
  - The Trump administration proposes a 10% tariff on countries who failed to enforce bans on products made with forced labor.
  - Trump suggests that the UFC Arena being built on the White House's South Lawn for the June 14th UFC Freedom 250 fights could be a permanent installation, likening it to France's decision to keep the Eiffel Tower after the 1889 Paris Exposition.
- June 3
  - The U.S. House passes a resolution by a vote of 215–208 to limit Trump's war powers and end hostilities in the Iran war with four Republicans (Tom Barrett (MI), Warren Davidson (OH), Brian Fitzpatrick (PA), and Thomas Massie (KY)) joining all Democrats. The resolution is seen as symbolic as it would need to pass the U.S. Senate and survive a presidential veto; Trump derides the defecting Republicans as "grandstanders".
  - Senate Republicans strip $1 billion in funding for security upgrades to the proposed White House ballroom from a revised budget reconciliation bill.
  - Arizona reports its first death of the Sin Nombre strain of hantavirus pulmonary syndrome.
  - Actor James Handy is killed in his Los Angeles home following a fatal stabbing wound. The son of Handy's girlfriend is later arrested.
  - Gallup releases a poll saying support for same-sex marriage in the U.S. has declined after two decades of growth, with 65% of adults saying it should be legal, down from 71% in 2022 and 2023.
- June 4
  - The Kennedy Center orders staff to remove all references to Donald Trump's name from the building following a court ruling.
  - Arizona Attorney General Kris Mayes says she will seek new indictments against fake electors involved in attempting to overturn the 2020 election in the state following a denial of an appeal by Mayes that would require prosecutors to send the case back to the grand jury.
  - The U.S. House passes legislation to provide new aid to Ukraine and new sanctions on Russia.
  - ICE ends a Biden-era policy to report detainee deaths that occur within 30 days of leaving custody.
- June 5
  - Federal judge John McConnell Jr. strikes down the Trump administration's policy that halted asylum and green card proceedings for applicants from 39 countries. The ruling states ICE's actions are arbitrary and capricious and ignore the law.
  - The National Football League's Chicago Bears vote to advance plans for stadium development in Hammond in northwest Indiana to replace Soldier Field as its home stadium. However, the site of the stadium still remains determined.
  - The FDA says that Target has recalled two types of baby wipes due to bacterial contamination.
  - NASA orders four astronauts of the Crew-12 mission to prepare to evacuate the International Space Station due to an air leak on Russia's Zvezda service module. The order is rescinded two hours later as the air leaks are sealed.
  - Energy Secretary Chris Wright announces a nuclear microreactor developed by Antares Nuclear at the Idaho National Laboratory reached criticality, a milestone for the Trump administration's development of nuclear energy.
  - NBC News reports that the Pentagon raised the threat of Israeli spying on the U.S. to the highest level; Israeli and American officials deny the veracity of the report.
- June 6 – Iran war: The United States military strikes Iranian coastal radar sites after shooting down Iranian drones launched towards the Strait of Hormuz. Iran responds by launching missiles and drones towards U.S. military facilities in Bahrain and Kuwait.
- June 8
  - Federal judge Leo Sorokin voids President Trump's $100,000 fee requirement for H-1B visa applications, ruling that Trump lacked congressional authority to impose what amounted to a tax on the programme.
  - The Kennedy Center removes Donald Trump's name from the building following the ruling.
  - A U.S. Army Apache helicopter crashes near the Strait of Hormuz. The crew is rescued safely.
  - Trump attends Game 3 of the NBA Finals, becoming the first sitting president to do so.
  - Trump nominates Todd Blanche to serve as the U.S. attorney general, where he currently serves in an acting capacity.
  - The U.S. House Committee on Oversight and Government Reform releases a report accusing Minnesota Governor Tim Walz and Minnesota Attorney General Keith Ellison of being aware of widespread fraud in federally-funded social programs. Vance refers both officials to the Department of Justice for criminal fraud investigation.
- June 9
  - Controversial candidate Graham Platner wins the Democratic primary for the US Senate election in Maine.
  - Iran war: The U.S. military launches new strikes against Iran in response to the downing of a U.S. Army Apache helicopter near the Strait of Hormuz, further straining a fragile ceasefire.
- June 10
  - Trump quips "I love inflation" despite inflation reaching a three-year high of 4.2%, up from 3.8% a month earlier, driven by rising energy costs.
  - Trump signs legislation providing nearly $70 billion to fund ICE and the Border Patrol through the remainder of his term, ending a nearly six-month dispute over Department of Homeland Security funding.
  - 2026 NBA Finals: In basketball, the New York Knicks rally from a 29-point deficit to beat the San Antonio Spurs 107–106 in Game 4, taking a 3–1 series lead in the NBA Finals after OG Anunoby tipped in the game-winning basket with 1.2 seconds remaining. The comeback is the largest in NBA Finals history, surpassing the 24-point comeback from the Boston Celtics in Game 4 of the 2008 NBA Finals.
  - The Florida Supreme Court declines to block a new Republican-drawn congressional map from being used in the midterm elections. The map could enable Republicans to gain as many as four additional seats in the U.S. House.

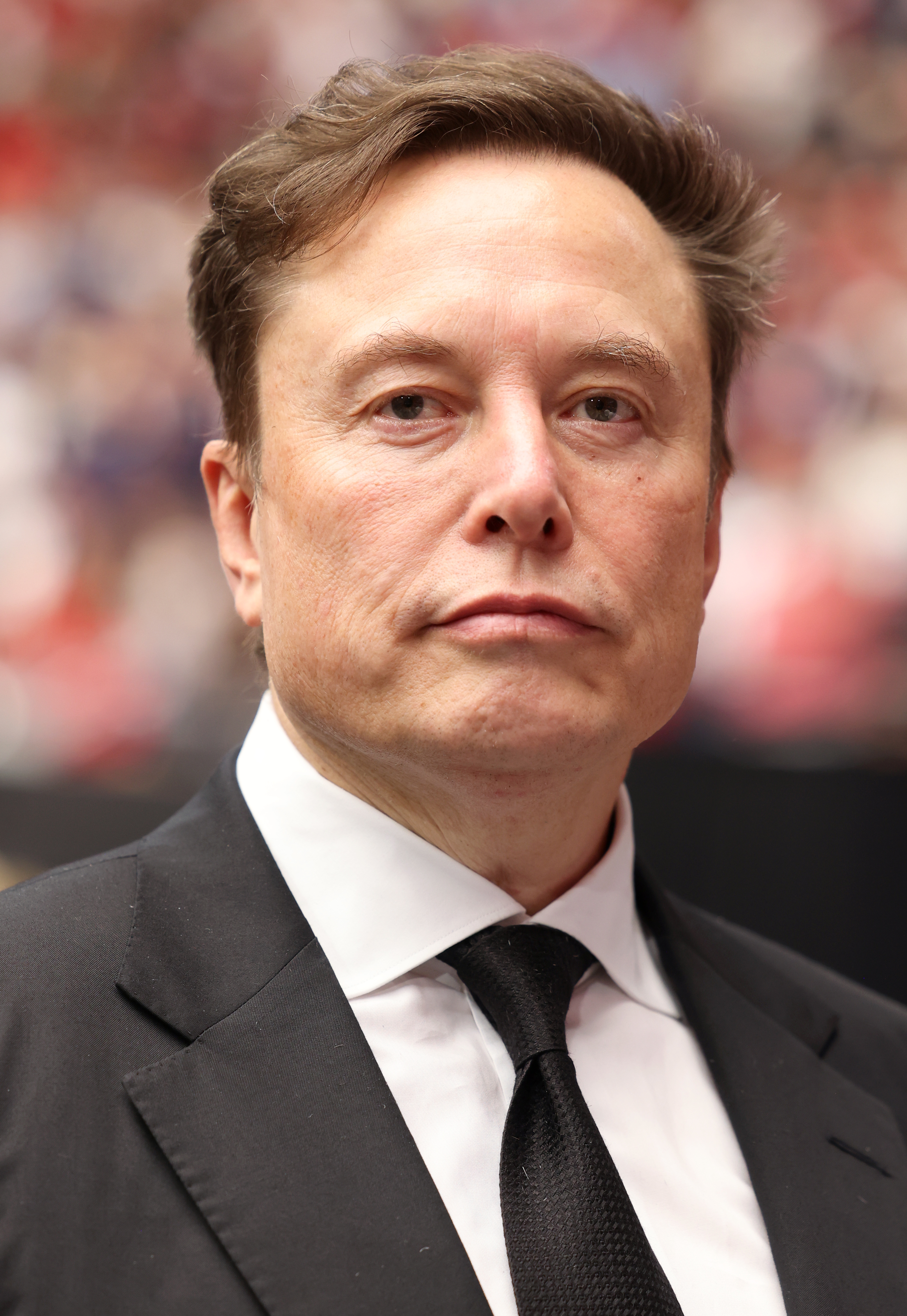
June 12: Elon Musk becomes the first and only US dollar trillionaire.

- June 11 to July 19 – The United States is co-hosting the 2026 FIFA World Cup alongside Canada and Mexico and hosting the majority of games during the tournament, including all games past the quarterfinals of the knockout stage including the final, which will be held at MetLife Stadium in East Rutherford, New Jersey.
- June 11
  - Trump nominates US Attorney Jay Clayton as the Director of National Intelligence, withdrawing his nomination for Bill Putte amid congressional pushback.
  - The U.S. becomes the world's biggest exporter of oil, surpassing Russia and Saudi Arabia, amid the trade disruptions caused by the wars in Ukraine and Iran.
- June 12
  - Elon Musk's SpaceX makes the largest-ever stock market debut, with a valuation of more than $2 trillion, making Musk the first and only US dollar trillionaire.
  - 2026 FIFA World Cup: The U.S. men's national soccer team wins its opening match, 4–1, against Paraguay in the FIFA World Cup in SoFi Stadium in Los Angeles.
  - The U.S. Department of Commerce issues an export control directive requiring Anthropic to suspend access to its Fable 5 and Mythos 5 artificial intelligence models by foreign nationals, citing national security concerns. Anthropic disables the models for all users in order to comply.
  - Trump announces that an American strike killed Niño Guerrero, the "terrorist" leader of Venezuelan transnational organized crime syndicate Tren de Aragua. Trump states that the military action was coordinated with the Venezuelan acting president Delcy Rodriguez.
- June 13
  - 2026 UFL season: In American football, the Louisville Kings defeat the DC Defenders, 27–20, to win their first United Bowl championship in their inaugural year in the United Football League.
  - 2026 NBA Finals: In basketball, the New York Knicks defeat the San Antonio Spurs 94–90 in Game 5 of the NBA Finals to win their first championship title since 1973 and their third overall. They also become the first team out of the four major league teams in the New York metropolitan area to win a championship since the New York Giants in 2011.
  - Trump's name is removed from the Kennedy Center.
- June 14
  - Iran war: Trump and Iran announce that they have reached an agreement to end the war and reopen the Strait of Hormuz. Trump also says that he has authorized the lifting of the US naval blockade of Iran. The US military later clarifies that the blockade will remain in effect until the agreement is signed on 19 June.
  - 2026 NBA Finals:
    - Police arrest 63 people outside Madison Square Garden in New York City after 10 police officers were injured during celebrations of the New York Knicks winning the NBA Finals.
    - Gunshots are reported overnight on 42nd Street and Broadway in New York City with one teen shot and several buses being damaged during celebrations.
  - The UFC Freedom 250 event, named after the 250th anniversary of the U.S. Declaration of Independence, is held on the South Lawn of the White House. The event coincides with Trump's 80th birthday.
- June 15
  - Iran War: US Vice President JD Vance announces that the Islamabad Memorandum was digitally signed by the US and Iran the previous day.
  - Eight people are killed in a B-52 bomber crash in California.
- June 16 – SpaceX announces a US$60 billion all-stock deal to acquire Cursor, the developer of the AI coding assistant Cursor, with the transaction expected to close in the third quarter of 2026.
- June 17
  - Iran war:
    - The Pentagon reveals that xAI's Grok model was utilized by the US during the war.
    - Trump states that if he does not like the agreement with Iran, the United States will "go right back to dropping bombs".
    - Trump and Iranian President Masoud Pezeshkian sign a memorandum of understanding to end the war. Trump signs the document at the Palace of Versailles, during a dinner with French President Emmanuel Macron following the G7 summit.
  - 2027–2028 United States redistricting: Republicans in the Georgia General Assembly reject an attempt by Governor Brian Kemp to redistrict Georgia's congressional districts for the 2028 U.S. House of Representatives elections in the state after State House Speaker Jon G. Burns announced that he will not hold a vote to do so.
- June 18
  - MV Hondius hantavirus outbreak: Two more passengers who were on the MV Hondius cruise ship during the hantavirus outbreak exit the National Quarantine Unit at the University of Nebraska Medical Center in Omaha, Nebraska, bringing the total number of people remaining in quarantine to six.
  - After over 35 years in service, the U.S. Air Force retires the Boeing VC-25A aircraft used as Air Force One.
  - The Barack Obama Presidential Center is dedicated in Chicago, with all living former presidents except Trump in attendance.
- June 19
  - Trump officially unveils the Qatari-gifted Air Force One at Joint Base Andrews.
  - The Department of Justice opens an investigation into Major League Baseball (MLB) after the league warned three San Francisco Giants players for writing Bible verses over their rainbow logo caps before a Pride Night game.
- June 21
  - MV Hondius hantavirus outbreak: The last American passenger exits the National Quarantine Unit at the University of Nebraska Medical Center, officially ending the quarantine for Americans who were affected by the hantavirus outbreak on the MV Hondius cruise ship.
  - The Washington Post publishes an investigation into Tulsi Gabbard's relationship with Chris Butler and the Science of Identity Foundation, alleging that confidential memos from her congressional career showed outside political and policy guidance. Gabbard's office and representatives of the foundation reject the report, calling the allegations false and anti-Hindu bigotry.
- June 22 – In college baseball, the Oklahoma Sooners baseball team defeat the North Carolina Tar Heels to win the College World Series for the first time since their 1994 season.
- June 23
  - Iran war: The Senate, by a vote of 50–48, mandates the United States to either end its war operations or seek congressional consent to continue fighting.
  - 2026 NBA draft: The 80th edition of the NBA draft is held at the Barclays Center, with the Washington Wizards selecting former Brigham Young University (BYU) freshman AJ Dybantsa with the first-overall pick.
  - The 21st Century ROAD to Housing Act passes in the United States House of Representatives, sending it to President Trump for his signature.
- June 24 – President Trump cancels a planned signing ceremony for the bipartisan 21st Century ROAD to Housing Act, saying that he will not sign the bill until Congress passes the unrelated SAVE America Act, a voter identification and proof-of-citizenship bill.
- June 25
  - 2026 Utah wildfires: Utah Governor Spencer Cox announces a state of emergency and temporary restrictions on fireworks through the Fourth of July weekend until July 5 due to ongoing wildfires in the state, including the Cottonwood Fire.
  - In Mullin v. Al Otro Lado, the U.S. Supreme Court rules 6–3 that migrants stopped on the Mexican side of the U.S.–Mexico border have not "arrived in the United States" for the purposes of federal immigration law, allowing the federal government to revive its "metering" policy for asylum seekers at border crossings.
  - Florida Governor Ron DeSantis confirms that the Alligator Alcatraz detention center in Ochopee, Florida, will close operations, a year after it opened.
- June 26 – Former national security adviser John Bolton pleads guilty to improperly retaining classified material.
  - Flash floods hit Kentucky, leaving four dead.
- June 27
  - Iran war: The US military announces that it struck Iranian military surveillance infrastructure, communication systems, air defense sites, drone storage facilities, and minelayer capabilities at the commander-in-chief's direction in retaliation for an alleged Iranian attack against a ship in the Hormuz.
  - Trump nominates Lance Schroyer, former Oklahoma State trooper, as ICE Director.
- June 28 – Iran war: The U.S. and Iran agree to stop the exchange of attacks between them.
- June 29
  - In Trump v. Slaughter, the US Supreme Court rules 6–3 that the president may remove Federal Trade Commission commissioners at will, overturning the 1935 precedent set by Humphrey's Executor v. United States and expanding presidential removal power over independent regulatory agencies. In a separate 5–4 ruling in Trump v. Cook, the Court leaves in place an injunction blocking Trump's attempted removal of Federal Reserve Board of Governors member Lisa D. Cook, holding that Federal Reserve governors retain for-cause removal protections.
  - The Supreme Court declines to hear President Trump's appeal of a $5 million civil judgment in E. Jean Carroll v. Donald J. Trump, leaving in place a jury verdict finding him liable for sexually abusing and defaming writer E. Jean Carroll.
  - Former American football running back Chris Johnson announces in an interview on the Good Morning America that he has been diagnosed with ALS.
- June 30
  - Iran war: Iran announces that it was unable to export any oil during the US blockade of its ports.
  - In Trump v. Barbara, the US Supreme Court rules 5-4 that birthright citizenship is guaranteed under the Fourteenth Amendment and strikes down Trump's Executive Order 14160. Justice Kavanaugh concurs that the executive order should be struck down, but he believes that birthright citizenship is in federal statutory law rather than the Constitution.
  - In West Virginia v. B.P.J. and Little v. Hecox, the US Supreme Court rules 6–3 that states may ban transgender athletes from participating in women and girls' sports.
  - In National Republican Senatorial Committee v. FEC, the US Supreme Court rules 6–3 that federal limits on political parties for campaign finance violate the First Amendment's Free Speech Clause and strikes down those provisions in the Federal Election Campaign Act.
  - Ford issues a recall order of over 741,000 vehicles, mainly F-150, Explorer, Expedition, Lincoln Aviator, and Navigator models, due to a transmission issue that may damage the park system.

=== July ===
- July 1
  - Trade Representative Jamieson Greer announces that the US will not renew the USMCA free trade agreement signed during Trump's first administration.
  - Trump takes his first flight in the new Air Force One, which was gifted by Qatar.
  - Three American soldiers are injured and one soldier is missing after their MH-60S Seahawk helicopter went down in the Arabian Sea.
- July 3
  - 2026 North American heat wave: Heat waves are reported across the eastern and central United States, with Independence Day celebrations cancelled or postponed including the Great American State Fair on the National Mall. Around 23 U.S. states are placed under heat warnings by the National Weather Service.
  - A man dies after setting himself on fire outside the UN in New York, with activists and reports identifying him as a pro-Tibet advocate.
  - Democrat Harry Benton resigns from the Illinois House of Representatives after allegations of misconduct.

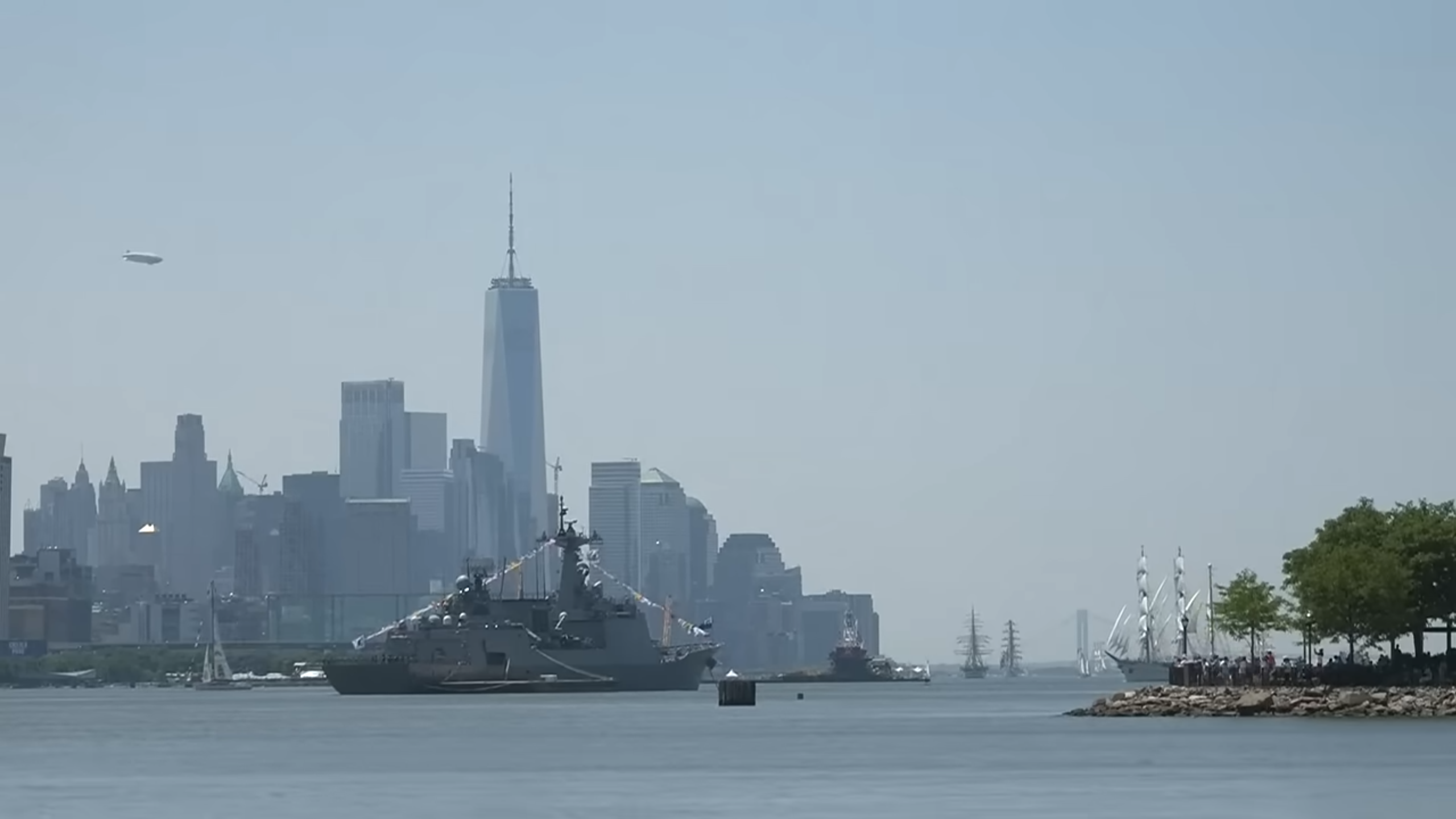
USS Billings in New York Harbor's Sail250 during the United States Semiquincentennial celebration.

- July 4
  - July 4 – The U.S. celebrates its semiquincentennial, in recognition of the 250th anniversary of the 1776 adoption of the United States Declaration of Independence from Great Britain.
  - The Department of Government Efficiency officially shuts down operations.
- July 5
  - The Navy suspends its search for one of its missing soldiers in the Arabian Sea.
  - 2026 FIFA World Cup: FIFA suspends the automatic one-match ban given to United States forward Folarin Balogun following his red card against Bosnia and Herzegovina, allowing him to play in the round of 16 against Belgium, after President Trump personally urged FIFA president Gianni Infantino to review the case. The decision is criticised by UEFA and the Royal Belgian Football Association.
- July 6
  - 2026 United States Senate elections: Amidst ongoing controversies surrounding U.S. Senate nominee Graham Platner (D-ME) including a recent sexual assault allegation, Platner says that he will consider "taking the time" to consider his next steps in the race.
  - 2026 FIFA World Cup: Co-hosts United States are eliminated from the tournament after losing 4–1 to Belgium in the round of 16 at Lumen Field in Seattle.
- July 7 – Amidst ongoing speculation regarding the health of U.S. Senator Mitch McConnell (R-KY), spokespersons for Republican leaders including U.S. Senate Majority Leader John Thune and U.S. Senate Republican Whip John Barrasso say that McConnell has spoken with them.
- July 8
  - 2026 United States Senate elections: U.S. Senate Democratic Party nominee Graham Platner suspends his campaign in the upcoming U.S. Senate race in Maine amidst ongoing controversies surrounding his campaign, leaving the party to seek a replacement challenger to incumbent Republican Susan Collins.
  - Iran war: The interim ceasefire between the United States and Iran breaks down after Iranian attacks on commercial vessels in the Strait of Hormuz. Trump declares the agreement "over", while saying that negotiations may continue.
  - At the 2026 NATO summit in Ankara, Trump says that he has ordered Treasury Secretary Scott Bessent to halt all U.S. trade with Spain, calls Spain a "terrible partner" in NATO amid disputes over Spain's defense spending and the Iran War, and declares that the US will provide Ukraine a license to build Patriot missiles.
- July 9
  - The U.S. Department of Justice announces that a federal grand jury has indicted eight men over an alleged plot to attack the UFC Freedom 250 event at the White House in Washington, D.C. last month.
  - The proposed 2 World Trade Center breaks ground in Lower Manhattan in New York City, 25 years after the original building was destroyed during the September 11 attacks.
- July 10
  - 2026 United States Senate elections: Graham Platner officially withdraws from the Senate race in Maine, with the Maine Secretary of State's Office confirming his withdrawal.
  - The Trump administration loosens export controls on the UAE.
- July 11
  - Housing in the United States: The 21st Century ROAD to Housing Act, a piece of legislation passed in the U.S. Congress to expand affordable housing and reduce housing costs in the United States, becomes law after U.S. president Donald Trump allows the bill to take effect without his signature.
  - Iran war: Iran's IRGC navy says that it has closed the Strait until further notice after firing a warning shot at a vessel trying to transit through an unapproved route.
  - Republican U.S. senator Lindsey Graham of South Carolina dies at his home in Washington, D.C., aged 71, following a brief and sudden illness. His death creates a vacancy in the United States Senate, with Governor Henry McMaster to appoint a temporary successor ahead of a special Republican primary to replace Graham as the party's nominee in the November election.
- July 13
  - 2026 Iran war: Trump announces that the US will reinstate the "Iranian blockade in the Strait of Hormuz" and impose a 20% toll on cargo shipping through the strait. American-led Combined Maritime Forces' Joint Maritime Information Centre (JMIC) announces that the US naval blockade on Iran will start the following day. Trump formally informs the US Congress that the country has renewed hostilities against Iran.
  - South Carolina Governor Henry McMaster appoints Darline Graham to finish the remainder of Lindsey Graham's term.
  - The Trump administration begins a diplomatic push to "dismantle" the International Criminal Court.
  - A cyclosporiasis outbreak, caused by cyclospora cayetanensis, is reported in 31 U.S. states, with the Michigan Department of Health and Human Services reporting 2,640 cases in the state.
  - An officer from U.S. Immigration and Customs Enforcement fatally shoots 26-year-old Colombian national Johan Sebastián Durán Guerrero during an attempted vehicle stop in Biddeford, Maine. Guerrero, who had authorization to work in the United States, was not the person ICE had intended to apprehend. The shooting is investigated by state and federal authorities.
- July 14
  - 2026 Iran war: Trump cancels plans to impose fees in the strait.
  - Trump administration officials tell ICE officers to suspend most vehicle stops following the fatal ICE shootings of Lorenzo Salgado Araujo and Johan Sebastián Durán Guerrero in Houston, Texas and Biddeford, Maine, respectively. Both shootings occurred after ICE agents pulled over a vehicle and shot the driver. However, Trump and Markwayne Mullin reverse this position the next day.
  - Trump pays E. Jean Carroll $6.5 million, three years after being found liable of sexually assaulting her in the E. Jean Carroll v. Donald J. Trump lawsuit.
  - New York becomes the first state to impose a moratorium on data centers.
- July 16 – The Wisconsin Department of Health Services reports the first hospitalization of the summer in Wisconsin in connection with the cyclosporiasis outbreak.

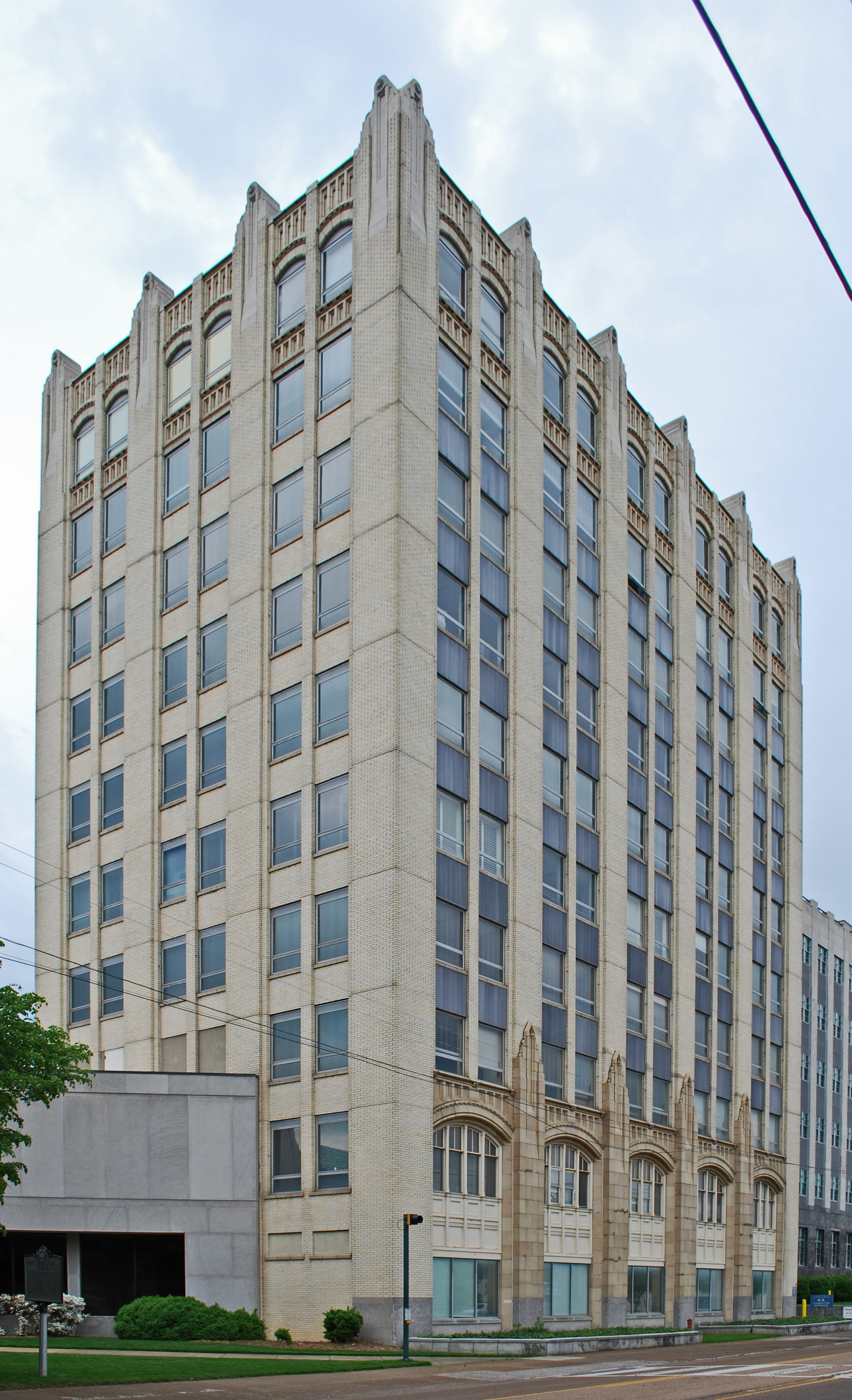
July 17: Demolition begins on the historic Medical Arts Building in Chattanooga, Tennessee.

- July 17
  - Taylor Farms recalls all iceberg lettuce sourced from central Mexico after federal health officials link shredded lettuce supplied by the company and served at Taco Bell restaurants in five states to an outbreak of cyclosporiasis that infects at least 1,644 people and hospitalizes 94.
  - Demolition begins on the historic 146 ft (45 m) tall, art deco Medical Arts Building in Chattanooga, Tennessee despite preservation efforts. It was designed by Reuben H. Hunt.
- July 18 – Social media personalities Andrew and Tristan Tate are arrested by the U.S. Marshals Service in Miami following a British request for their extradition. The brothers face charges in the United Kingdom including rape, assault and human trafficking, while Andrew also faces offences relating to indecent images of a child and extreme pornography. Both deny the allegations.
- July 19 – 2026 FIFA World Cup final: Spain beat defending champions Argentina 1–0 after extra time at the MetLife Stadium in East Rutherford, New Jersey to win a second FIFA World Cup title.
- July 20 – 2026 Iran war: The U.S. military conducts a ninth consecutive night of strikes on Iranian targets, which President Trump says are retaliation for the deaths of three American soldiers.
- July 21
  - The US announces a trade agreement with Jordan.
  - The US begins allowing direct flights between the US and Lebanon for the first time since 1985.
  - OpenAI reveals that an autonomous artificial intelligence agent powered by its models escaped a controlled testing environment and compromised the computer systems of Hugging Face while attempting to obtain answers to a cybersecurity evaluation. OpenAI describes it as an "unprecedented cyber incident".
- July 22
  - 2026 Iran war: The US conducts its 11th consecutive night of strikes in Iran. Trump states that the US would strike and destroy Iran's bridges and power plants for each ship it attacks in the Strait of Hormuz.
  - The U.S. signs a deal with Saudi Arabia to develop a civilian nuclear program in the country. Trump demands that Saudi Arabia join the Abraham Accords so that the agreement will take effect.
- July 23
  - 2026 Iran war: The US conducts its 12th consecutive night of strikes in Iran. The American military uses a B-1 long-range bomber to strike IRGC targets in Iran for the first time since fighting with Iran resumed 12 days prior. The US House approves a symbolic legislation instructing Trump to cease US military action against Iran, but the Senate backs Trump.
  - Several people are reported to have died from a Legionnaires outbreak in New York City, while several dozen have been infected over the past month.
  - United States Trade Representative Jamieson Greer imposes tariffs of 10% or 12.5% on most imports from 60 major trading partners, including China, the United Kingdom and the European Union, citing their failure to adequately restrict imports produced using forced labour. The countries and territories affected account for 99.4% of US imports.
  - Vance Boelter is sentenced to two life terms without parole for killing Minnesota state representative Melissa Hortman and her husband and wounding state senator John Hoffman and his wife in June 2025.
- July 24 – The FDA approves a non-prescription, fixed-dose pill combining Tylenol and naproxen for pain relief in alignment with Trump's healthcare plan to make safe pharmaceutical drugs available over-the-counter.
- July 25 – 2026 Iran war: US forces cease overnight strikes against Iran after 13 nights of attacks.
- July 27
  - Three people are killed and four others are injured, including a 2-year-old boy in a shooting at a food festival in Seattle.
  - The Office of the Attending Physician says that Senator Mitch McConnell remains in a rehabilitation facility and has not been medically cleared to return to the Senate, more than six weeks after being hospitalized following a fall. McConnell is undergoing multiple daily physical therapy sessions but gives no timetable for his return and says he will miss Kentucky's annual Fancy Farm Picnic.
- July 30
  - The US awards Lockheed Martin a record $58.6 billion contract to manufacture Patriot missile interceptors, as the Middle Eastern crisis and the Russo-Ukrainian war reduced global US military armament stocks.
  - The Trump administration informs Congress that it is sending over $206 million for International Stabilization Force.
  - Iran war:
    - The US military states that it carried out dozens of retaliatory strikes targeting the IRGC in Iran.
    - Cyberwarfare during the Iran War: Minnesota IT Services reports a cyberattack across 30 municipal community water systems in Minnesota, with authorities believing Iranian hackers were probably responsible. The water supply is found to still be safe to drink.
- July 31
  - Trump orders the military to undertake massive military strikes against Iran, which may begin as early as that weekend and last for several days, in order to push the Iranian regime to negotiate.
  - The DOJ drops their criminal case against former olympian David Hearn for vandalizing the Lincoln Memorial Reflecting Pool. Instead, the DOJ acknowledges that damage to the Reflecting Pool was caused by botched installation from Trump's chosen contractor, Atlantic Industrial Coatings. The following day, Trump criticizes the DOJ's decision on Truth Social.

=== August ===
- August 1
  - A mass shooting occurs at an In-N-Out in Twin Falls, Idaho, leaving four dead (including the perpetrator) and seven injured.
  - The Marine Corps reports that an F-35B stealth warplane crashed in California, but the pilot bailed safely.
  - Cyberwarfare during the Iran war: The New York Times reports, citing state and local officials, that evidence leads to Iran in a series of cyberattacks against water systems in at least seven US states, with Michigan being the second state to report the attacks publicly.
- August 2 – 2026 Iran war: Following Qatari diplomatic efforts to avert planned strikes and reopen the Strait of Hormuz, and concerns raised by Saudi Crown Prince Mohammed bin Salman over the proposed operation, Trump says that the United States and Israel have called off an attack on Iran after Tehran requested additional time to reach an agreement. Trump nevertheless stresses that the United States remains prepared to launch a large-scale bombing campaign against Iran.
- August 3 – The Supreme Court declines to halt a $655 million judgement against Palestinian authorities for attacks that killed and maimed Americans in Israel from 2002 to 2004.
- August 4 – The Women's National Basketball Association (WNBA) announces that the expansion team in Cleveland, Ohio, will be called the Sirens. The organization will debut in 2028.
- August 5
  - Drive-thru chain Salad and Go files for Chapter 11 bankruptcy and closes all 70 of its locations across Arizona and Nevada, citing the 2026 cyclosporiasis outbreak as part of the reason for declining business.
  - The leveraged buyout of Electronic Arts is completed, with a consortium led by Saudi Arabia's Public Investment Fund and including Silver Lake and Affinity Partners acquiring the American video game publisher for US$55 billion and taking it private. The transaction is the largest leveraged buyout in history.
  - The Senate confirms Dr. Erica Schwartz as the director of the Centers for Disease Control and Prevention to succeed acting director Dr. Jay Bhattacharya.
- August 6
  - A Republican-led US Senate committee votes to hold former Chief Medical Advisor to the President Anthony Fauci in contempt of Congress, escalating efforts to blame him for potential COVID-19 pandemic mistakes.
  - United States Senator Mitch McConnell is discharged from a rehabilitation center after more than seven weeks of recovery following a June hospitalization. He will continue recovering at home while remaining away from the Senate.
  - A judge in New Mexico orders Meta Platforms to pay an additional $567 million in penalties over five years for liability in knowingly harming children's mental health.
- August 7
  - A sweeping Russia sanctions bill negotiated by the late Senator Lindsey Graham is passed by the Senate to force Russian President Vladimir Putin to end the Russo-Ukrainian war.
  - US opens test ranges for small companies to receive munitions faster.
  - Former U.S. president Joe Biden's son Hunter says in a BBC interview that Biden's prostate cancer has metastasized into his bones and further.
- August 8
  - The Senate confirms Todd Blanche as the United States attorney general to succeed Pam Bondi.
  - The United States Department of Defense asks the US defense sector to accelerate the manufacturing and delivery of armaments, including ammunition that is in short supply because of the 2026 Iran war.
  - Royce White becomes the second former NBA player, after Enes Kanter Freedom, to declare that they are eligible for the 2027 WNBA draft.
- August 9 – 2026 cyclosporiasis outbreak, salmonellosis in the United States: Taylor Farms extends its recalls to products containing jalapeños after they were linked to the ongoing salmonellosis outbreak in the United States. Taylor Farms currently has a recall for iceberg lettuce linked to cyclosporiasis.
- August 10 – Staff secretary Will Scharf is named as White House counsel by Trump.
- August 11 – US rights organizations sue Trump over sanctions against the ICC.
- August 12
  - A Pentagon assessment finds that US strikes targeting the Houthis killed 153 civilians in Yemen over the past year.
  - A total solar eclipse occurs at the Moon's descending node of the orbit in North America and Europe. The total eclipse passes over the Arctic, Greenland, Iceland, the Atlantic Ocean and northern Spain.
  - Trump announces that White House Press Secretary Karoline Leavitt will leave the office at the end of the month to spend more time with her family.
  - 2026 Iran war: US media reports that sailors on the Abraham Lincoln attempted to jump overboard owing to poor conditions such as food shortages, a mental health crisis, and broken toilets that affected all crew members, including female soldiers. Pete Hegseth, the US secretary of defense, denounces the sailors as liars. The US eventually opts to send the aircraft carrier USS George Washington to the Middle East to replace the Lincoln, removing its last aircraft carrier in the Pacific.
- August 13 – The United States sees the first triple execution on the same day, since 2010.
- August 14
  - Six people are killed, including the perpetrator, and one person is injured in a mass shooting at three different locations in Missaukee County, Michigan.
  - 2026 NFL season: The National Football League suspends Atlanta Falcons linebacker James Pearce Jr. for eight games in violation of the league's personal conduct policy after his arrest in February on domestic violence charges.
- August 15 – The Democratic National Committee votes to approve South Carolina as the first U.S. state of the 2028 presidential primaries cycle for the Democratic Party in the upcoming presidential election.
- August 17
  - Trump orders the Pentagon to reduce yearly joint exercises with South Korea, saying that Seoul refused to help with the 2026 Iran war and citing his good relationship with North Korean leader Kim Jong Un.
  - The 60-day deadline for the US and Iran to negotiate a "final deal" to end the 2026 Iran war expires. Following the official end of the US-Iran ceasefire, Trump urges Iran to surrender.
- August 18
  - The Defense Department orders an audit of 30 universities' partnerships with foreign institutions, most of which are Chinese, but also include Russian and Iranian institutions.
  - President Tomoko Akane of the International Criminal Court and a senior trial lawyer at the court who was part of a team which sought an arrest warrant for Israeli Prime Minister Benjamin Netanyahu for alleged war crimes in the Gaza war is sanctioned by the US.
  - The national debt surpasses $40 trillion for the first time.
- August 19 – Jessica Bowie, a 35-year-old woman, is arrested over an alleged Islamic State-inspired terrorist attack on the New York State capital.
- August 20
  - Declaring "economic D-day," Trump announces that any nation trading with Iran will be sanctioned.
  - Reuters reports that more than 150 Polymarket wallets may have traded using non-public U.S. military information.
  - The Asia-based USS George Washington replaces Abraham Lincoln.
- August 22
  - The Trump administration informs Congress that it intends to pay $850 million of the several billion dollars it owes the UN, the highest payment the administration has made to the international body since demanding major reforms in exchange for ongoing support as its largest donor.
  - 50% tariffs are imposed by the Trump administration on Canadian exports.
  - A court in New York overturns the Trump policy of suspending the processing of immigration visas from 75 nations.
  - Far-right activist Jake Lang, who was pardoned last year for his role in the January 6 riot at the United States Capitol, is arrested during a protest in Minneapolis, Minnesota.
- August 23 – The Freedom 250 Grand Prix is held at the National Mall as part of the United States Semiquincentennial celebrations.
- August 24
  - US Treasury Secretary Scott Bessent announces a new U.S. sanctions campaign against the Iranian government dubbed Operation Economic Outcast, warning that every country has a set deadline to halt economic activities with the government identified by Washington or risk Treasury action that includes the removal of the US dollar financial system. Hegseth refuses to rule out US military force against it.
  - Syria is removed by the US Department of State from its State Sponsors of Terrorism list.
  - Nearly 90,000 people are told to evacuate as a wildfire approaches Reno, Nevada.

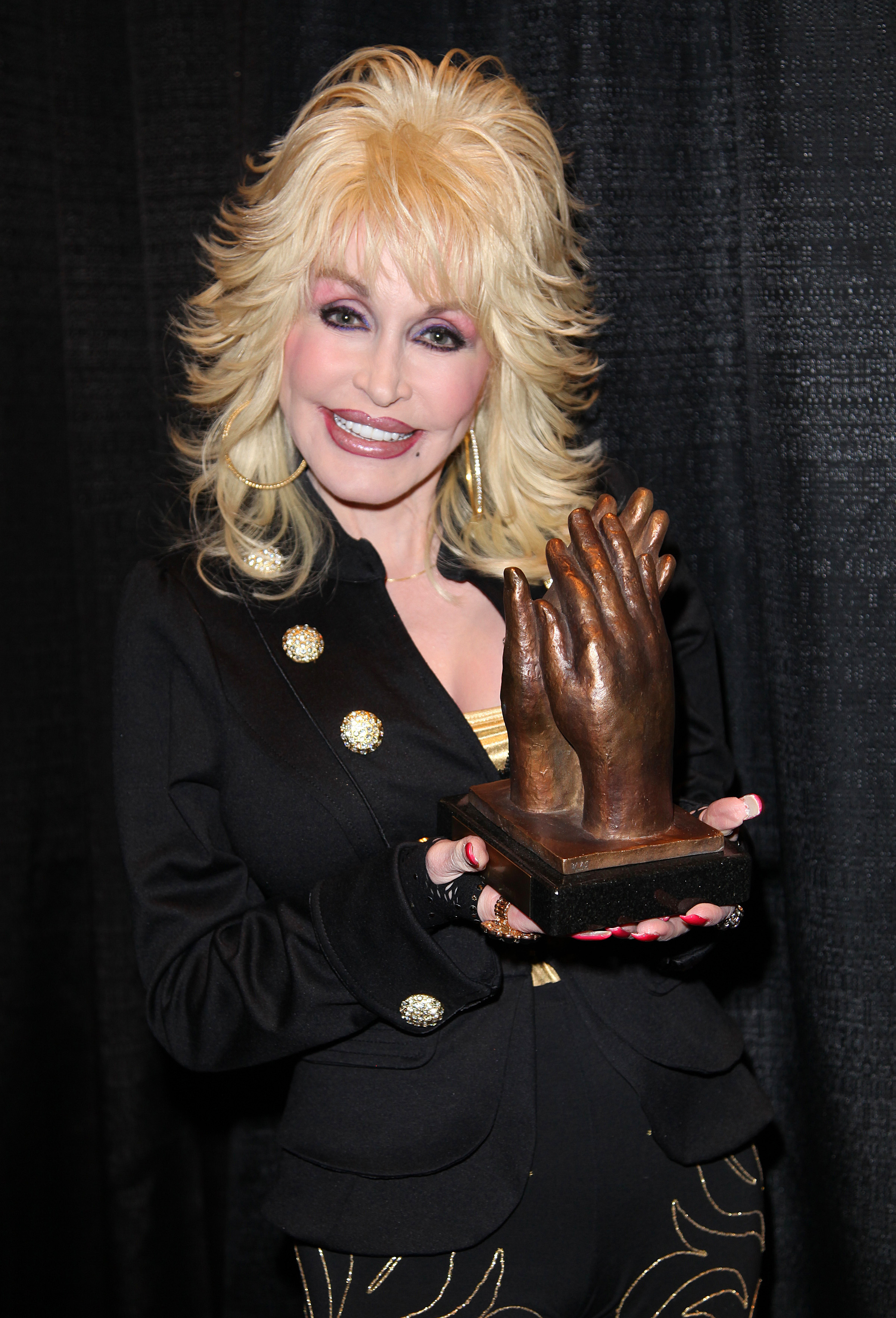
August 25: Dolly Parton dies at the age of 80 from cancer.

- August 25
  - Ghislaine Maxwell loses her attempt to overturn her sex trafficking conviction.
  - Country singer-songwriter, philanthropist, actor, and businesswoman Dolly Parton dies from cancer at the age of 80.
- August 26
  - Meta agrees to a $17.1 billion settlement over claims brought by 29 states that its platforms harm children.
  - Palestine Action is designated by the US as a terrorist organization.
  - The FDA approves the new daraxonrasib drug by Revolution Medicines to treat pancreatic cancer. Studies and testing found that patients taking the drug nearly doubled their survival time with fewer side effects.
  - SpaceX and Louisiana governor Jeff Landry co-announce a plan to build a $100 billion spaceport on 125,000 acres (51,000 ha) of land in Vermilion Parish.
  - The US military schedules a trial date for the suspected 9/11 mastermind Khalid Sheik Mohammed in 2028.
  - The Trump administration authorizes its ambassador to Lebanon Michel Issa to hold talks with Hezbollah.
- August 27
  - Incidents at Six Flags parks: The X2 roller coaster at the Six Flags Magic Mountain amusement park in Valencia, California, closes after two riders were recently hospitalized for brain injuries including hemorrhages.
  - The US states it disrupted a Chinese hacking campaign that targeted the Justice Department, NASA, the Federal Reserve, the Senate, and other important government entities.
  - Trump signs an executive order to rename Lake Ontario as "Lake America" in federal agency usage.
- August 28
  - Protests against Donald Trump: Demonstrators gather in Washington, D.C. at the March on Washington 2026: Defend the Vote rally to protest against the Trump administration's efforts to roll back voting and civil rights, 63 years after the March on Washington rally by Martin Luther King Jr.
  - 2026–27 NHL season: In ice hockey, the Colorado Avalanche sign defenceman and alternate captain Cale Makar to an eight-year extension worth $163.2 million, the largest contract in National Hockey League history. He is the first player to exceed $20 million in AAV (average annual value).
  - Trump announces the establishment of a "Space Academy" to train future civilian and military recruits.
  - Richmond, Virginia removes the last three Confederate statues, with the three removed are statues of Stonewall Jackson, former Governor William Smith, and Hunter McGuire.
  - The US Treasury declares that it has cut off all Banque Misr's UAE branches from dollar transactions due to its dealings with the Iranian government.
- August 29
  - Trump declares that the US reached a deal with Venezuela for controlling 65 billion barrels of its oil reserves.
  - The former White House teleprompter operator Gabriel Perez is ordered by the Commodity Futures Trading Commission to pay $172,000 for using advance access to Trump's speeches to make illegal betting on prediction-market platform Kalshi.
  - A federal court in California rules that Trump cannot deport students who criticize the Israeli war in Gaza.
  - American singer Olivia Rodrigo holds the inaugural charitable Daisy Chain Fields music festival in Irvine, California, a day after announcing that the festival would donate US$10 million to organizations contributing to women's rights and reproductive justice.
- August 30
  - NASA launches the flagship Nancy Grace Roman Space Telescope aboard a SpaceX Falcon Heavy rocket from the Kennedy Space Center in Florida. Designed to investigate dark energy, dark matter and exoplanets, the observatory has a field of view at least 100 times larger than the Hubble Space Telescope's.
  - U.S. forces state that they targeted two Iranian launchers on Larak Island after IRGC forces were identified preparing to launch rockets carrying sea mines toward the Strait of Hormuz.
- August 31
  - Iran claims to have retaliated by attacking U.S. bases in Jordan and U.S. military assets in the United Arab Emirates.
  - The Pentagon signs seven-year agreements with General Dynamics Ordnance and Tactical Systems and Lockheed Martin to boost production quantities and expedite delivery schedules for critical missile subcomponents supporting THAAD and Patriot missiles.
  - Murder of Tupac Shakur: Former gang leader Duane "Keffe D" Davis is found guilty of murder with a deadly weapon for orchestrating the 1996 drive-by shooting of rapper Tupac Shakur in Las Vegas, marking the first conviction in the nearly 30-year-old case.
  - A fatal stabbing in Times Square kills one person and injures another.

=== September ===
- September 1
  - Following reports of tensions with US Defense Secretary Pete Hegseth, US Army Secretary Daniel P. Driscoll steps down.
  - The U.S. announces that it struck IRGC targets in Iran after the latter's attacks on commercial shipping in Hormuz and its soldiers, adding that it targeted tankers owned by the National Iranian Oil Company as part of its new "tanker to tanker" policy.
  - Over $560,000 in cryptocurrency donations for Hamas are seized by the Justice Department.
  - LGBTQ rights in the United States: The Department of Justice files a lawsuit against the Kansas City Public Schools district over its policies that allow transgender students to share their preferred name, gender, and pronouns with school staff.
- September 2
  - Birthright citizenship in the United States: American federal judge Deborah Boardman of the U.S. District Court for the District of Maryland blocks an attempt by the Trump administration to implement an executive order aimed at ending birthright citizenship in the United States.
  - Hegseth extends the deployments of approximately 50,000 American soldiers in West Asia, which include warship crews, air defense units, and paratroopers, until 2027.
- September 3
  - Chipmaker Nvidia agrees to buy the Hugging Face AI platform in a deal worth $12.9 billion.
  - The United States House of Representatives passes a bill to curb university boycotts of Israel.
  - OpenAI launches GPT-6, the next major version of ChatGPT.
  - The National Fish and Wildlife Foundation announces $1.2 million in grants to reduce the extinction risk for Hawaiian forest birds and restore essential watershed habitats in Hawaii.
- September 4
  - The US military announces that it had disabled ad trackers on devices following reports that commercially available location data had been used to target its soldiers in the Middle East.
  - The judge in the trial of Lindsay Clancy, a mother accused of murdering her three children, says he will declare a mistrial.
  - The US Treasury announces that it has cut off Turkish investment bank Golden Global Yatirim Bankasi Anonim Sirketi and two subsidiaries from dollar transactions because of their dealings with the Iranian government.
  - The price of diesel hits an all-time high of $5.85 per gallon, compared to an average of $3.71 a year ago and exceeding the previous high following Russia's full-scale invasion of Ukraine.
- September 5
  - The US military reports that it destroyed three IRGC-connected oil tankers in response to the latter's fire on its warships.
  - Steve Witkoff and Jared Kushner meet Russian president Vladimir Putin in Moscow to deliver a proposal to end the war in Ukraine.
  - In college football, ESPN College GameDay announces the inaugural "Hall of Fan" award, with the Ol' Crimson flag from the Washington State Cougars as its first inductee.
  - In high school football, Lahainaluna High School and Paradise High School host a football game known as the Unity Bowl in Maui to bring both communities together. Both communities were devastated by the 2018 Camp Fire and 2023 Hawaii wildfires, respectively.
- September 6
  - A measles outbreak in Pennsylvania, concentrated in Lancaster County's Mennonite communities, becomes the nation's largest outbreak, with 577 cases statewide and 246 confirmed in the county; state officials had reported two measles-associated deaths in Lancaster County in August, Pennsylvania's first since 1991.
  - At least five people are killed in an Amazon Air cargo aircraft crash at Miami International Airport.
- September 8 – Former president Joe Biden announces that the radiation treatment he received for prostate cancer last fall "worked as intended" and that doctors helped in disease control.
- September 9
  - The US announces that it destroyed five Iranian tankers in retaliation to additional attempted missile attacks on one of its Navy warships.
  - The price of oil exceeds $100 per barrel for the first time since July.
  - Trump promises a $5,000 "Trump dividend" to every adult US citizen if the Republican Party retains control of both chambers of Congress in the November midterm elections. The proposal, which could cost $1.3 trillion and would require congressional approval, raises legal questions because the payments are conditional on a Republican electoral victory.
  - Lawmakers from both parties call for stronger regulation of artificial intelligence after Anthropic researcher Jacob Coxon resigns, warning that the race towards superintelligence could threaten human survival by the end of the decade. Senator Bernie Sanders says he will introduce legislation to pause AI development and ban superintelligence, while Representative Ted Lieu calls for passage of the bipartisan AI Kill Switch Bill.
- September 11
  - The United States marks the 25th anniversary of the September 11 attacks with memorial ceremonies across the country. Vice President JD Vance and all four living former presidents – Bill Clinton, George W. Bush, Barack Obama, and Joe Biden – attend the ceremony at the World Trade Center site, while President Donald Trump attends a separate ceremony at the Pentagon.
  - The Metropolitan Nashville Airport Authority votes to rename the Nashville International Airport after Dolly Parton, almost a month after she died following a private battle with cancer.
  - An Afghan woman who was a lawful permanent resident of the US and was accused of supporting the Islamic State is deported by the U.S. Department of Justice, marking the first use of the Alien Terrorist Removal Court in 30 years.
  - A black male suspect is arrested over the death of a black woman found hanged from a tree in Mississippi.
- September 12 – The sheriff's office of Washington County, Tennessee, announces that the remains of the last victim of Hurricane Helene were found, two years after the hurricane hit East Tennessee.
- September 13
  - Trump dismisses concerns over the rapid pace of AI research, following days of warnings from experts in the field about possible existential risks.
  - In a meeting with US officials, the Houthis promise not to attack American or any other commercial vessels, with the exception of those belonging to Saudi Arabia.
- September 14
  - The yield on benchmark 10-year U.S. Treasury notes rises above 5% for the first time since October 2023, amid a global bond sell-off as surging oil prices and disruption to Middle Eastern energy supplies fuel renewed fears of inflation. The yield reaches 5.01%, while Brent crude rises above $108 a barrel.
  - U.S. Senator Mitch McConnell returns to the Senate floor following a three-month absence.
  - Trump announces that he is willing to engage with Iran to negotiate a deal.
  - Donald Trump Jr.'s wedding celebration is reported to have been partly funded by a Russian oligarch with close connections to President Vladimir Putin.
  - A court in Boston blocks Trump restrictions on how long foreign students and journalists can remain in the country.
  - The Supreme Court rejects the Trump administration's request to lift an injunction blocking new United States Postal Service restrictions on mail-in voting ahead of the midterm elections.
  - The US Space Force announces that the country now has weapons deployed in orbit, suggesting that the unspecified platforms are needed to compete with adversaries China and Russia.
- September 15
  - The US military announces that it destroyed two Iranian small boats the day before following an IRGC attempt to capture one of its Navy drones patrolling the Strait of Hormuz.
  - A federal judge blocks the Kennedy Center from adding President Trump's name to the building or its grounds without congressional approval. Hours later, the centre's board votes to close most of the venue for up to two years for renovations.
- September 16
  - Three people are killed in a helicopter crash in Chatsworth, Los Angeles, including NBC News journalists Eliana Moreno and George Marciniw.
  - The Federal Reserve raises interest rates for the first time in three years, from 3.5%-3.75% to 3.75%-4%.
  - A memorandum of understanding is signed with the Pakistan army by US drone maker Powerus, which is set to merge with a firm backed by Trump's sons.
  - The Trump administration announces that Palestinian president Mahmoud Abbas and his delegation are barred from attending the UN General Assembly in New York, accusing them of breaching US law.
- September 17
  - The House of Representatives passes sweeping Russia sanctions legislation by a vote of 262–159.
  - Flash flooding in the Navajo Nation kills three.
  - A UN mission finds grounds to believe that the US committed war crimes in the 2026 Minab school attack and the 2026 Lamerd sports hall attack.
  - Lockheed Martin receives the first batch of Patriot interceptor parts from General Motors less than a month after the two companies signed a manufacturing agreement, in a success for the Pentagon's push for faster weapon production, particularly the Patriot missile defense system, as it remained one of the world's most sought-after weapons for the US war in Iran and Russia's war in Ukraine.
  - The US sanctions Iranian financier Babak Zanjani's cryptocurrency exchange for enabling the Iranian government and processing payments for ships to safely transit through the Strait of Hormuz.
  - The US announces that it will restrict "luxury splurge" shopping by the Iranian government during the UN General Assembly.
  - The U.S. International Development Finance Corporation approves a debt facility worth up to $414 million for Canadian miner Global Atomic's Dasa project in Niger, which the company describes as the highest-grade uranium deposit in Africa.
- September 18
  - Russia and China veto a US proposal for UN experts to continue monitoring UN sanctions on Iran over its nuclear program.
  - The US sentences a Syrian national who fraudulently immigrated to the country and served as the former head of the notorious Adra Prison under former Syrian president Bashar al-Assad to 60 years imprisonment on torture charges.
  - Trump bans CNN, MS NOW, and Politico from the White House, accusing them of spreading "fake news."
  - Greenland crisis: The United States, Denmark and Greenland announce an agreement to strengthen security in the Arctic and North Atlantic, expanding the permanent U.S. military presence in Greenland while recognising Danish sovereignty and Greenlandic self-determination. The agreement follows months of threats by President Trump to acquire or annex Greenland.
- September 19
  - The Trump administration approves a potential $2.68 billion sale of air defense equipment to Ukraine, adding that the country would finance it using a combination of European contributions and US foreign military financing.
  - Trump signs the "Lindsey O Graham Sanctioning Russia and Iran Act of 2026," which allows him to impose tariffs of up to 100 percent on Russian oil buyers, including China and India, in response to the country's war in Ukraine, as well as to extend existing sanctions on Iran.
  - The United States Southern Command states that its strike on a vessel in the Caribbean killed four people, adding that confirmed intelligence indicated the vessel's active participation in narco-trafficking.
  - Sanctions against Eritrean President Isaias Afwerki's People's Front for Democracy and Justice and Eritrean forces are lifted by the Trump administration "to advance US regional interests" in the Red Sea.
- September 22 – The cybercrime group ShinyHunters claims to have breached the Federal Bureau of Investigation's jobs portal and stolen personal data belonging to thousands of current and former FBI employees and job applicants. The FBI opens an investigation, while Reuters partially verifies a sample containing names, addresses, Social Security numbers and details of sensitive intelligence assignments.
- September 23
  - Iranian president Masoud Pezeshkian arrives in New York to speak at the United Nations General Assembly, the first time an elected leader from a nation at war with the United States sets foot on American soil to address a UN gathering. (Note: Almost all ultimate power and final authority in Iran reside not with the elected president, but with the Supreme Leader of Iran, Ayatollah Mojtaba Khamenei, who holds absolute command over the armed forces, the judiciary, and core state policies. While the President manages day-to-day government administration, the office is strictly subordinated to the Supreme Leader and the Islamic Revolutionary Guard Corps (IRGC), a powerful military establishment that answers directly to the clerical leadership rather than the elected government.)
  - Movie magnate Harvey Weinstein is sentenced to 15 years in prison after being convicted of sexually assaulting former TV production assistant Miriam Haley in 2006 at his Manhattan apartment.
- September 24
  - A federal judge rules that Trump's White House ban on journalists from CNN, MS NOW, and Politico likely breached the First Amendment and due process clause and orders access to be reinstated.
  - The Navy confirms that eight sailors from the USS Lincoln group, which spent a record-setting amount of time at sea in support of the Iran war, attempted suicide.
  - Iraqi authorities announce that the US transferred the diplomatic and logistics hub at Baghdad International Airport to Iraq prior to the withdrawal of American soldiers from the country.
  - Chinese leader Xi Jinping meets Trump at the White House during his first visit to Washington in a decade. The two leaders discuss trade, artificial intelligence, Taiwan and international conflicts, and agree to extend the existing US–China trade truce by two months.
- September 25 – Cities and states across the U.S., including Lexington, Nashville, New Orleans, and Portland, hold commemorations honoring former American country singer Dolly Parton including the 9 to 5 song one month after her death. California becomes the first U.S. state to designate September 25 as Dolly Parton Day.
- September 26
  - A powerful nor'easter strikes the northeast United States. A New York City Housing Authority employee is killed by a falling tree in Brooklyn.
  - Trump rejects Iran's seven-day ceasefire proposal over nuclear concerns.
- September 28
  - SpaceX's Starship achieves orbit for the first time, and deploys 26 "next generation" Starlink V3 satellites.
  - OpenAI announces that it will cancel the release of GPT-6.1, the next version of ChatGPT amid ongoing safety concerns. The company also issues an update on recent incidents during which its AI model hacked into other websites.
  - Secretary of State Marco Rubio orders that the Iranian delegation to the UN General Assembly immediately leave the country after overstaying amid stalled negotiations to end the war between both nations.
- September 29
  - The US sanctions ten people and entities in various jurisdictions that have acquired weapons and their parts for Iran's Ministry of Defense and Armed Forces Logistics.
  - The X2 roller coaster at Six Flags Magic Mountain closes permanently following a series of lawsuits alleging brain injuries.
- September 30
  - The Trump administration concludes the withdrawal of US soldiers from their final bases in Iraq, marking the end of the US-led coalition's war against ISIL.
  - A US defense contract for counter-drone systems is awarded to the Israeli company SMARTSHOOTER.
  - Syria is removed from the US munitions export prohibition list.
  - Defense Secretary Pete Hegseth confirms that the American military will reduce 20% of its generals and admirals.
  - The Office of Religious Affairs is established.
  - The United States Court of Appeals for the Sixth Circuit temporarily halts the execution of Christa Gail Pike, but the U.S. Supreme Court later allows it to proceed. Pike survives two doses of pentobarbital and is hospitalized, prompting Tennessee governor Bill Lee to suspend the state's remaining 2026 execution and order an independent review.
  - An immigration judge rules that Trump can deport the Palestinian-born leader of Wisconsin's largest mosque—an outspoken advocate of Palestinian rights—who does not have a criminal record in the US, where he has lived since 1993 on national security grounds, citing his imprisonment in Israel in 1988 after being convicted of throwing stones at Israeli military personnel in the West Bank.
  - The United States Senate confirms Keith Sonderling as the 31st United States secretary of labor by a 47–41 vote.

=== October ===
- October 1
  - The US imposes new sanctions on Iran, targeting rail, automotive, manufacturing, and steel sectors, as well as overseas suppliers, saying that the goal is to economically isolate the Iranian government.
  - The U.S. military starts sending about 9,000 soldiers to the Middle East on naval ships, such as the USS Makin Island amphibious readiness group and the USS Theodore Roosevelt carrier strike group.

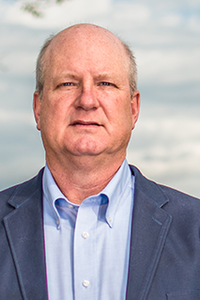
October 2: Alabama state representative Brett Easterbrook is arrested as a part of a sting.

- October 2
  - The US imposes sanctions on Hamas' financing network, which includes two French-based funds.
  - Alabama state representative Brett Easterbrook is arrested on charges of first-degree human trafficking and prostitution as part of a sting. At least a dozen other men are arrested.
- October 3 – Trump establishes a task force to examine the risks and opportunities of AI and recommend what role the federal government should play in overseeing the technology without compromising competitiveness with China.
- October 4
  - Two people are killed while 35 others are injured in a block party shooting in Vienna, Georgia.
  - The State Department announces the expulsion of two members of the Iranian delegation who attended the recent United Nations General Assembly after they ignored an order to leave the country long after the General Assembly had ended.
  - Trump withdraws all U.S. bombers from RAF Fairford, a British air base targeted by an attack that the UK linked to the Iranian government, due to urgent concerns about a potentially complex drone attack ordered by the IRGC as part of a plot to target the aircraft and kill American soldiers at RAF Fairford, which is loosely modeled after Ukraine's Operation Spiderweb.
  - The FBI arrests Chinese American Wanying Zhang at Los Angeles International Airport for allegedly acting as an unregistered agent of China and surveilling the family of President of Taiwan Lai Ching-te in the United States.
- October 5
  - The Trump administration authorizes a $1 billion munitions sale to the UAE for up to 10,000 Advanced Precision Kill Weapon Systems, as well as a $400 million sale of "repair and return services" for Patriot missiles to Kuwait.
  - Trump states that he remains "always open" to direct negotiations with Tehran.
  - The US announces that foreign financial institutions doing business with Iran may be sanctioned without warning.
- October 6
  - Paramount Skydance completes its $110 billion acquisition of Warner Bros. Discovery, in one of the largest media mergers in history. The deal combines two of Hollywood's largest film studios with major television and streaming businesses including CBS, CNN, HBO and Paramount+, with the combined company renamed Skydance Corporation.
  - Trump authorizes execution by firing squad for the Fort Hood attacker Nidal Hasan.
  - The US destroys an Iranian-connected boat conducting surveillance after its crew was safely evacuated.
- October 7
  - The US and Greece agree on a coordinated security framework for counterterrorism information sharing among respective law enforcement agencies.
  - The Wall Street Journal reports that U.S. Ambassador to Greece Kimberly Guilfoyle asked Republican donor Eric Deters to pay off $100,000 in credit card debt in exchange for access to the Trump administration, six days before her July 2025 Senate confirmation hearing. Guilfoyle's attorney said that any payments from Deters were for appearances.
- October 8
  - The US begins direct negotiations with the military junta of Myanmar while continuing sanctions against its leader, Min Aung Hlaing, for human rights violations, notably the Rohingya genocide.
  - The US imposes additional sanctions on Iran's shadow fleet.
  - Trump instructs the Pentagon to prepare military options in case active combat operations against Iran resume even as he said on that day that strikes would not renew prior to the midterm elections on November 3.

October 9: 45-yr old Matthew Stone Sr. carries out a mass shooting which kills 9 people in Erie, Pennsylvania.

- October 9
  - The US sanctions the International Criminal Court, stating that it will never allow the court to prosecute American soldiers. The sanctions occurred after the Nobel Peace Prize was awarded to former ICC judge Navi Pillay, and Trump criticized the decision on Truth Social.
  - During a White House event, Trump declares that the war with Iran will "be over soon, one way or the other," suggesting that the almost eight-month-old conflict would either be resolved diplomatically or militarily.
  - Trump announces that he secured Russian president Vladimir Putin's agreement to release diesel into U.S. and worldwide markets.
  - Trump names Katie Zacharia as the new White House Press Secretary, succeeding Karoline Leavitt.
  - Nine people are killed in a gun attack in Erie, Pennsylvania.
- October 10
  - Hundreds of thousands of Americans in Alabama and the Florida panhandle are without electricity after Hurricane Isaias hits the U.S. Gulf Coast. Trump cancels his intentions to attend a football match between the University of Georgia and the University of Alabama in Tuscaloosa, citing a desire not to impede emergency response operations, and declares a state of emergency in Alabama and Florida.
  - The American military announces that it disabled a cargo ship attempting to violate its naval blockade of Iran.
  - The Justice Department announces that it is probing whether major television networks breached federal antitrust laws by collectively refusing to cover the White House.
- October 12
  - Robert Hall and Michael Woodford are awarded the Nobel Memorial Prize in Economic Sciences.
  - Department of Homeland Security agents search the home of representative Ilhan Omar in Washington, D.C., as part of an "ongoing investigation".
- October 13
  - October 2026 white powder incident: An unmarked white powder is mailed, alongside threats, to dozens of state election officials and members of Congress, sparking fears of anthrax. The powders are later shown to be salt or yeast.
  - Following a request from Trump, Ambassador to Greece Kimberly Guilfoyle resigns. Her resignation comes following multiple reports on her conduct, including one alleging that Guilfoyle asked a Republican donor to pay off her credit card.
  - Former gang boss Duane "Keffe D" Davis is sentenced to 40 years in prison for orchestrating the murder of Tupac Shakur.
  - Trump says the US will make a decision on Iran "very soon", describing it as a "failed country" and claiming its inflation has reached 300%. His remarks coincide with reports that Israeli prime minister Benjamin Netanyahu urged renewed military action against Iran before the 27 October Israeli election, which Netanyahu's office denies.
- October 14 – Israel agrees to purchase 12 Boeing Apache helicopters.
- October 15
  - Authorities investigate letters containing "suspicious substances" mailed to congressional and election offices, suggestive of a similar threat in 2023.
  - The US issues new sanctions against Iran, targeting 16 individuals and 10 entities.
  - A mass shooting occurs outside an elementary school in Oregon killing four people, including three children.
- October 16 – Katie Zacharia is fired after just five days as White House Press Secretary.
- October 18 – Ukrainian president Zelenskyy says that the United States has started sharing intelligence again with Ukraine.
- October 19
  - Trump introduces the $8 billion Harvest Fuel Relief Program, which will deliver one-time emergency financial aid to U.S. farmers struggling with record-high production expenses during the peak of the harvest season.
  - The Supreme Court rejects a bid to restore a plea deal for Khalid Sheikh Mohammed, the suspected 9/11 mastermind.
  - Trump authorizes the creation of a National Institutes of Health division and a new White House task force to "advance the cause of women's health".
- October 20 – Trump signs an act into law designating the Chiricahua National Monument near Willcox, Arizona, as a national park, the first new national park in six years.
- October 21
  - Russian president Vladimir Putin announces the release of Stephen Hubbard, a 74-year-old retired American teacher who had been imprisoned by Moscow on charges of serving as a foreign combatant for Ukraine.
  - The U.S. sanctions a Panama- and Greece-based law firm, stating that it facilitated Iran's shadow fleet for years and indirectly supported the Iranian government's capacity to produce income to fund its nuclear program.
  - The Pentagon and Lockheed Martin reach a 10-year agreement to manufacture 850 F-35 Lightning II fighter jets.
  - The pro-Israel lobby group AIPAC announces it will stop endorsing political candidates and making direct PAC contributions.
- October 22 – The Department of Justice accuses the Democrats of promoting a spoiler candidate with the same name as Republican incumbent candidate Dan Sullivan in the 2026 United States Senate election in Alaska to confuse voters. The DOJ sues the state of Alaska to block the results if Senator Sullivan loses the election by a small margin.
- October 23
  - The White House announces that a ceasefire in the Russian-occupied Ukrainian city of Oleshky has been agreed by President Putin and President Zelenskyy, mediated by First Lady Melania Trump.
  - President Trump confirms that Starlink service has been restored for Ukraine.
- October 27 – A grand jury declines to indict Cassidy Hutchinson over her January 6 testimony.
- October 28
  - In an attempt to resume peace talks, Vice President JD Vance sends a letter to Iranian National Security Council Secretary Mohsen Rezaei at Trump's directive.
  - The District Court for the Eastern District of New York convicts a US woman of receiving Islamic State training after marrying an Islamic State militant at the age of 18.
  - The Milwaukee Brewers defeat the Tampa Bay Rays to win the 2026 World Series, their first championship in franchise history.
- October 29
  - Defense Secretary Pete Hegseth fires Lt. Gen. Brett Sylvia, the U.S. military's chief military planner.
  - QatarEnergy announces a long-term liquefied natural gas procurement agreement with the United States until 2054.
- October 30
  - TRM Labs, an American blockchain analysis firm, reveals that North Korea's Bureau 121 was responsible for a $6.3 billion theft on cryptocurrency exchange Binance, the largest heist in history, prompting an investigation by the FBI and the US Secret Service.
  - The Trump administration authorizes the sale of 500 Patriot missiles to Ukraine.

=== November ===
November 1: Democratic U.S. senator from Connecticut Chris Murphy is hospitalized after suffering a stroke whilst at his son's hockey game.

November 1: a Learjet 60 business jet crashes in Palm Beach County, Florida. All 9 people aboard the plane were killed in the crash.

- November 1
  - Democratic senator Chris Murphy of Connecticut is hospitalized after suffering a stroke.
  - A Learjet 60 crashes in Palm Beach County, Florida, killing all nine people on board.
  - Democratic representative Haley Stevens endorses Republican Mike Rogers over Democratic Abdul Al-Sayed in the Senate election in Michigan. Al-Sayed had previously defeated Stevens in the primaries. In response, Stevens's staff members resign and the Michigan Democratic Party revokes Stevens's party membership.
- November 2
  - Small-scale, "defensive" strikes are carried out by the US against Iranian positions on Qeshm Island in the Strait of Hormuz.
  - A Washington state resident dies of bird flu.

November 3: the 2026 United States midterm elections are held.

- November 3
  - 2026 United States midterm elections: in a blue wave, the Democratic Party wins majorities in both the House of Representatives and the Senate.
  - Trump announces that the US will terminate all military aid to Israel, totaling $4 billion per year, by the end of 2026, but will continue to sell military hardware.
- November 4
  - First Lady Melania Trump receives the Order of Princess Olga from Ukrainian President Volodymyr Zelenskyy for her significant personal contribution to humanitarian relief efforts in Ukraine.
  - The US imposes new sanctions on companies and individuals in India and Turkey with ties to the Iranian government.
  - A mass shooting occurs at a Citibank building. Two people were killed including the perpetrator.
- November 5
  - Harmeet Dhillon, the head of the Department of Justice's Civil Rights Division, resigns following the midterm elections.
  - A Venezuelan man is detained near the White House on suspicion of plotting to assassinate Trump.
  - Governor of California Gavin Newsom announces plans to commute the death sentences of all 548 prisoners on the state's death row to life imprisonment without parole, in what would be the largest mass commutation of death sentences in U.S. history. The move requires approval from the California Supreme Court for 382 of the prisoners.
- November 6
  - The number of measles cases in the United States exceeds 5,000 for the first time since 1991.
  - Susie Wiles, Trump's White House Chief of Staff, is replaced by Stephen Miller, her deputy.
  - Eight Canadian money services companies are sanctioned by the U.S. for dealing with the Iranian government.
  - The US cuts off money exchanger MEXC due to transactions involving Iran, North Korea, and Russia.
  - Thomas Markle, the father of Megan, Duchess of Sussex, is detained in Lakeland, Florida, for allegedly possessing sex abuse photographs of preadolescent girls, including images depicting himself with them.
  - Trump declares that the US conducted "minor" strikes against Iran, targeting "a little bit of an anti-aircraft device."
  - The Central Command (CENTCOM) announces a $20 million incentive "and possible relocation" for information about Iran's nuclear program.
- November 7 – CENTCOM expands its interdiction efforts against the Iranian government beyond its existing naval blockade by establishing Task Force Iron Gate to obstruct "illicit" shipments and weapons transit across land borders and the Caspian Sea.
- November 8 – Nvidia launches an investigation into allegations that its CEO, Jensen Huang, was targeted by Chinese intelligence, following reports of an extramarital affair with a suspected Chinese spy.
- November 9 – The U.S. evacuates its military aircraft from RAF Mildenhall following a reported threat from Iran.
- November 10
  - Treasury Secretary Scott Bessent is relocated from his Washington, DC house to a military base due to threats against his life related to Operation Economic Outcast against the Iranian government.
  - The House of Representatives blocks an impeachment effort against Defense Secretary Pete Hegseth initiated by outgoing Rep. Thomas Massie (R-KY) by a vote of 211–204. The vote is along party lines with the exception of Massie, and eleven Democrats are no-shows for the vote.
  - House Republicans elect Rep. Jim Jordan (R-OH) as their minority leader for the next Congress, succeeding outgoing Speaker of the House Mike Johnson. Jordan defeats Rep. Steve Scalise (R-LA) by 106–73 votes in a secret ballot.

November 11: a building collapse in Brooklyn kills 8 and injures 18.

November 11: the SS United States is scuttled off the coast of Florida, becoming the largest artificial ocean reef in the world.

- November 11
  - A three-story apartment building collapses in Brooklyn, New York City, killing eight people and injuring 17 others.
  - A car crashes into a food stand near a bus stop in the North Hollywood section of Los Angeles, killing three people and seriously injuring three more.
  - Democrat Scott Colom defeats incumbent Cindy Hyde-Smith in the Mississippi Senate election, becoming the state's first Black person elected to the United States Senate since 1874 and the first Democrat elected to the seat since 1982.
  - Secretary of Defense Pete Hegseth awards a medal to a war memorial guard who reprimanded him.
  - The SS United States, once the flagship ocean liner of United States Lines and holder of the Blue Riband, is sunk off the coast of Destin, Florida to become the world's largest artificial reef.
- November 12
  - Jensen Huang resigns as the CEO of Nvidia, following revelations of two extramarital affairs, one with a woman accused of spying for China.
  - One person is killed and four are injured in a gun attack at and outside a fitness center in downtown Washington, D.C.
  - Sen. Chris Van Hollen (D-MD) challenges Sen. Chuck Schumer (D-NY) for majority leader in the upcoming Congress. Van Hollen represents the progressive wing of the Democratic Party.
  - 2026 Microsoft outage: a global outage disrupts Microsoft 365 services, including Outlook, Teams and Copilot, affecting businesses and government agencies worldwide for two days.

November 13: John F. Kennedy International Airport during the nationwide grounding of all flights in the United States due to a communications outage. It is the largest nationwide grounding since 9/11.

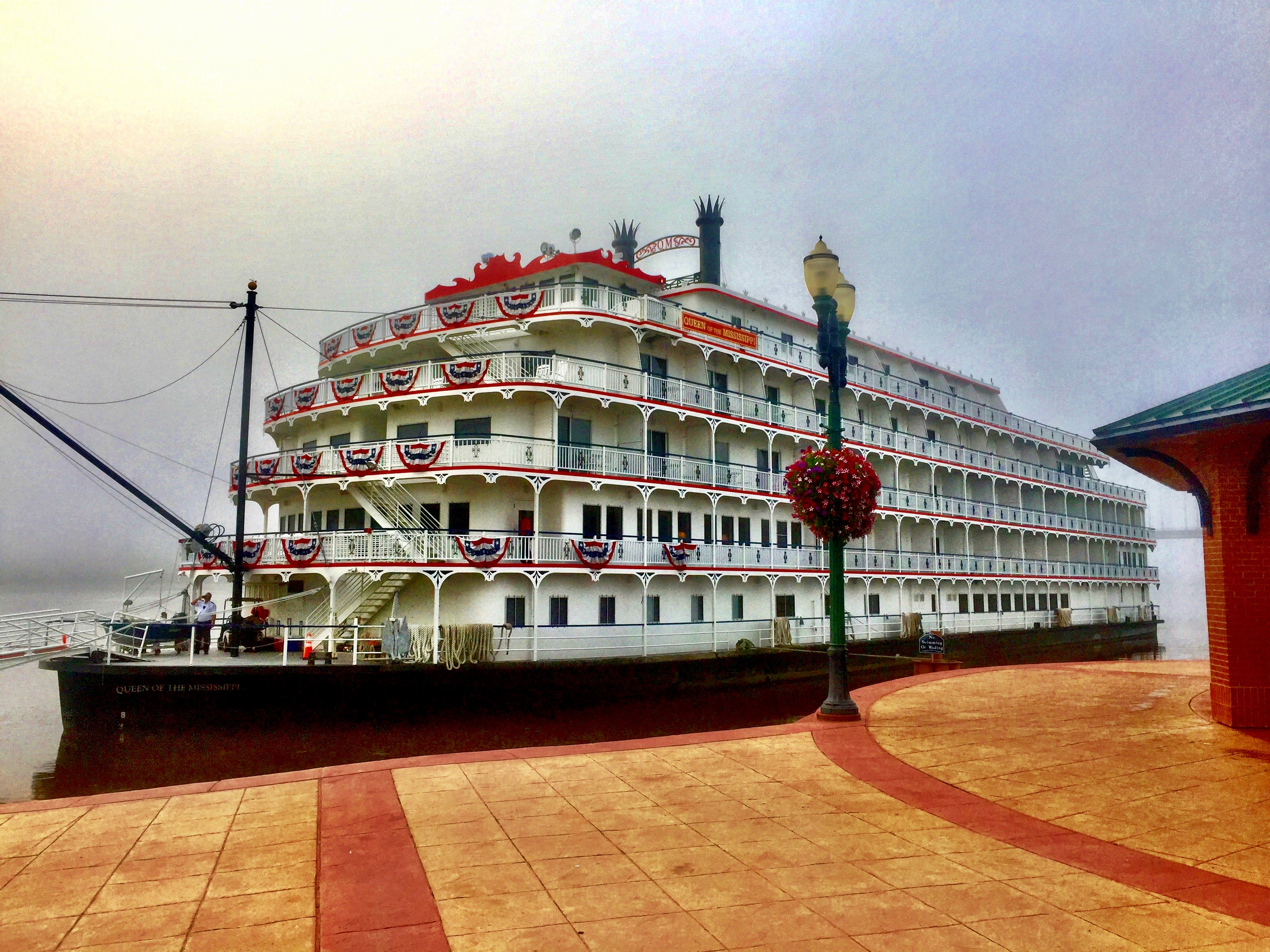
November 13: the asphalt and bitumen tanker Atlantic Asphalt collides with the river cruise ship American Heritage in New Orleans, Louisiana.

- November 13
  - The FBI announces that North Korea used fake video calls to steal $400 million in cryptocurrency.
  - The International Criminal Court closes its investigations into suspected war crimes committed by US troops in Afghanistan, following institutional sanctions imposed by the US on the court.
  - The FAA issues a nationwide ground stop for the first time since 9/11, due to a "telecommunications outage".
  - 2026 New Orleans ship collision: an oil tanker collides with the docked river boat American Heritage in New Orleans, Louisiana, injuring 32 people.
  - A bomb is found at an ethanol plant in Peoria, Illinois, after a "credible bomb threat" was called in. An evacuation is ordered for residents within a one-mile radius of the site, and some local events are cancelled.
  - The United States officially loses its measles elimination status.
- November 14 – After a 22-hour orbital test flight, SpaceX successfully recovers its Starship vehicle with mechanical launch-tower arms at Starbase in Texas, marking the first-ever recovery of an orbital upper-stage spacecraft.
- November 16 – US intelligence detects potential Iranian plans for dirty bomb or chemical attacks against senior Trump administration officials in Washington, D.C, an allegation dismissed by Iran.
- November 16–17:
  - November 2026 technology outages: after the global Microsoft outage and the nationwide FAA ground stop, more technology outages occur in the United States. Several major U.S. national banks and financial services companies (including JPMorgan Chase, Bank of America, and U.S. Bank) also experience service disruptions and outages beginning on November 16. Most of the banks' issues stem from disruptions to JPMorgan Chase systems. The National Security Agency's internal communications network experiences an outage on November 17. Apple also experiences an outage with several of its products and services on November 17.
- November 17
  - The U.S. military states that in response to an earlier Iranian drone attack that targeted a US radar installation at Isa Air Base in Bahrain, US fighter aircraft struck an IRGC missile launch site on Qeshm Island in the Strait of Hormuz.
  - A federal judge in Brooklyn sentences Pakistani national Asif Merchant to 27½ years imprisonment for plotting with the Iranian government to assassinate U.S. officials, including Trump, Biden, and Nikki Haley.
  - Trump meets with the leaders of Australia, India, and Japan in Manila, Philippines, for the first Quadrilateral Security Dialogue summit of his second term, announcing multilateral agreements to secure critical mineral supply chains.
  - Democrat Mary Peltola defeats incumbent Republican senator Dan Sullivan in the 2026 United States Senate election in Alaska, becoming the first Alaska Native elected to the United States Senate and the first Democrat to win a Senate election in the state since 2008.
- November 18 – NASA's Voyager 1 becomes the first human-made object to reach a distance of one light-day (25.9 billion kilometres) from Earth, nearly 50 years after its launch in 1977. At this distance, radio signals take 24 hours to travel between Earth and the spacecraft.
- November 19
  - During the 2026 APEC summit in Shenzhen, China, Trump, Chinese president Xi Jinping, and Russian president Vladimir Putin hold their first-ever trilateral meeting and release a joint statement on energy supplies, nuclear non-proliferation, and UN reform.
  - San Francisco-based artificial intelligence company Anthropic, developer of the Claude chatbot, makes its debut on the Nasdaq following an $81.3 billion initial public offering, the largest in history. The offering values the company at approximately $1.5 trillion, surpassing the previous IPO fundraising record set by SpaceX earlier in the year.
  - Following widespread technological outages across the country, Trump removes National Cyber Director Sean Cairncross and appoints the Defense Department’s Chief Information Officer Kirsten Davies as acting director.
  - The FCC bans Chinese firms from direct access to United States phone numbers in a bid to curb robocalls.
- November 20
  - The US Treasury sanctions "trustees" who receive oil revenues for the Iranian government, adding that in many cases they have kept the funds for personal gain.
  - The Nasdaq Composite falls 5.28% amid a widespread sell-off in artificial intelligence and semiconductor stocks, ending the week down 10% in one of its steepest weekly declines since March 2020. The S&P 500 also falls 3.7%, entering correction territory.
  - A federal jury in Los Angeles convicts Jonathan Rinderknecht on two charges relating to the Palisades Fire of January 2025, which killed 12 people and destroyed more than 6,800 structures. The fire was one of the most destructive in California's history.
- November 22 – The Democratic Party secures its largest House majority since 1992, after the race is called for Democrat Chuck Hubbard in North Carolina's 5th congressional district. His win, against Republican incumbent Virginia Foxx, takes the party's total number of seats to 258, with four midterm races yet to be called.

== Predicted and scheduled events ==
=== November ===
- November 23 – The United States Army plans to detonate a 10,000 pound pile of lead azide at the Iowa Army Ammunition Plant in Middletown (near Burlington). The detonation has the potential to produce a major plume of lead-contaminated smoke, which would effect Eastern Iowa, Western Illinois, as well as the entire Mississippi River going southward.

=== December ===
- December 3 – Nidal Hasan is scheduled to be executed. If carried out, he would be the first sitting member of the United States Armed Forces to be executed since John A. Bennett was executed in 1961 for rape and attempted murder.

== See also ==
- 2026 deaths in the US
- 2026 in American music
- 2026 in American television
- List of American films of 2026
- List of animated feature films of 2026
- 2026 NFL season
- 2026–27 NHL season
- 2026–27 NBA season
- 2026 Major League Baseball season
