= Naval boarding =

Offensive tactic used in naval warfare

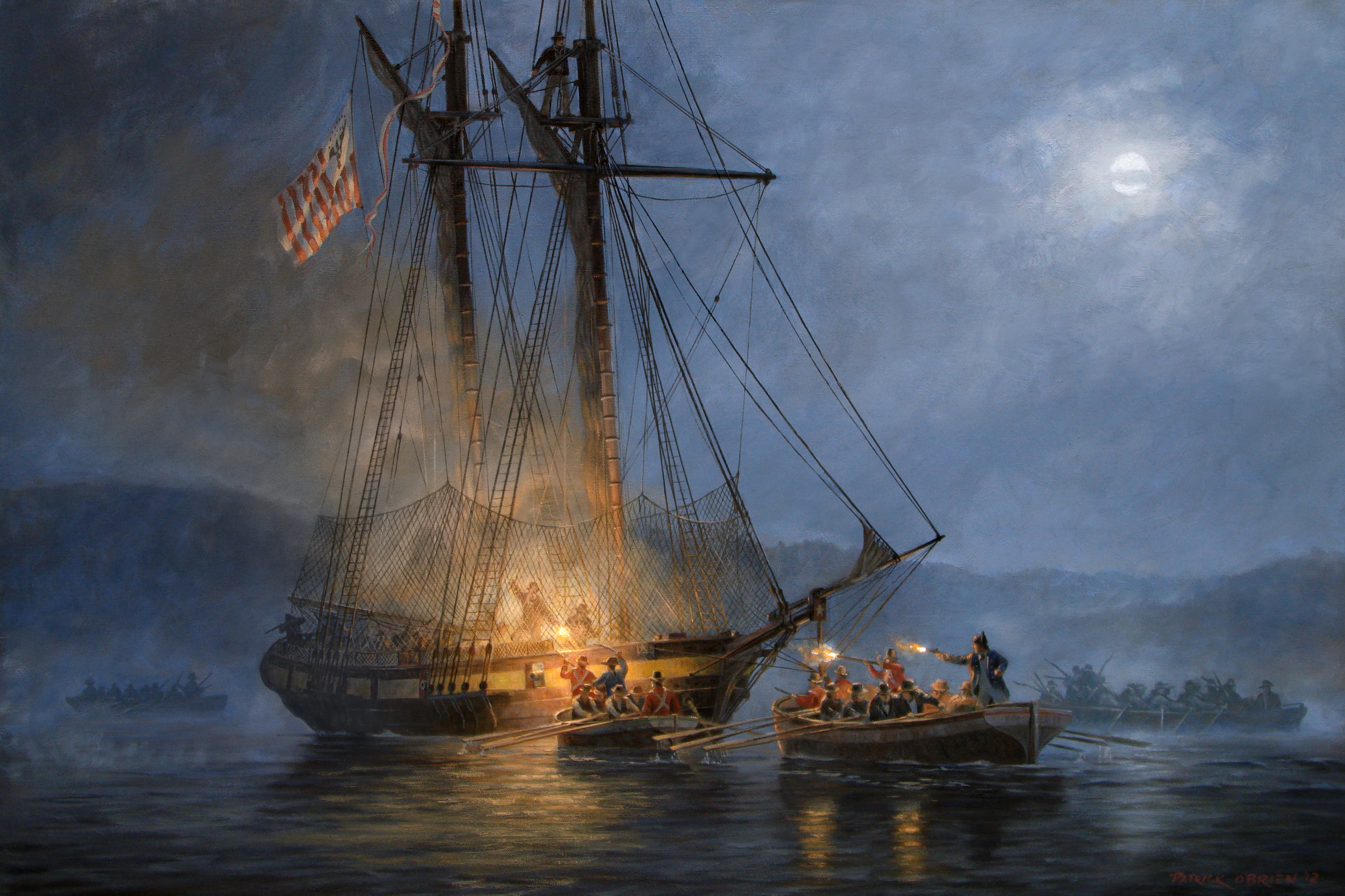
A Royal Navy cutting out party attacking USRC Surveyor on 12 June 1813 during the War of 1812

Naval boarding is an offensive tactic used in naval warfare to come up against (or alongside) an enemy watercraft and attack by inserting combatants aboard that vessel. The goal of boarding is to invade and overrun the enemy personnel on board in order to capture, sabotage, or destroy the enemy vessel. While boarding attacks were originally carried out by ordinary sailors who are proficient in hand-to-hand combat, larger warships often deploy specially trained and equipped regular troops such as marines and special forces as boarders. Boarding and close-quarters combat had been a primary means to conclude a naval battle since antiquity, until the early modern period when heavy naval artillery gained tactical primacy at sea.

A cutting out boarding is an attack by small boats, preferably at night and against an unsuspecting and anchored, target. It became popular in the later 18th century, and was extensively used during the French Revolutionary and Napoleonic Wars. This heralded the emphasis on stealth, and surprise, that would come to dominate future boarding tactics. An example is the successful cutting out of the Hermione which took place at Puerto Cabello, Venezuela, on 25 October 1799. In modern warfare, boarding by military forces almost always involves stealth, and usually takes place at night. It may involve the use of small submarines or submersibles, inflatable boats, or frogmen. All involve scaling the sides of the ship. When stealth is not as important, helicopters may be used to carry troops to the deck of the ship.

== In wartime ==
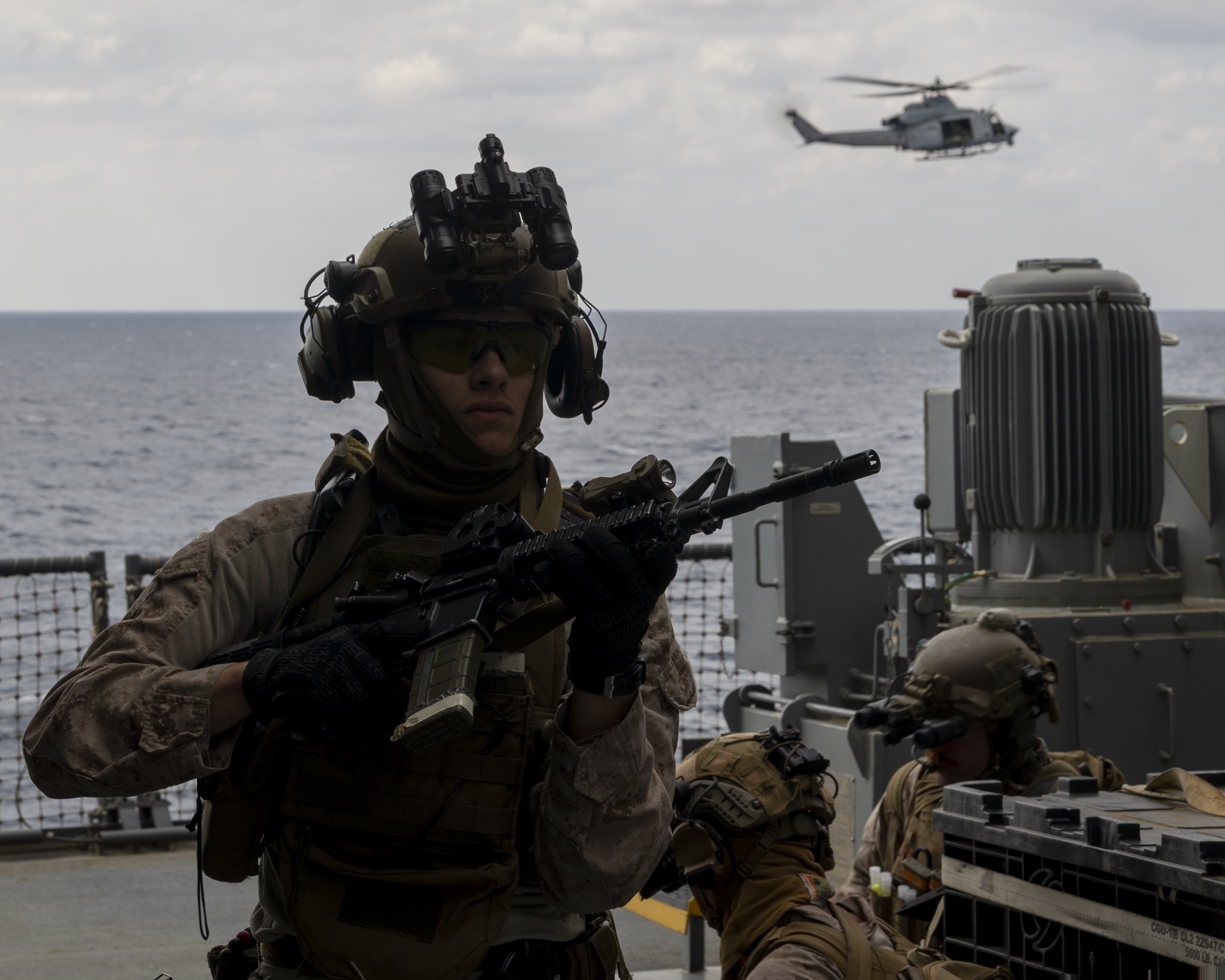
A US Marine Corps visit, board, search, and seizure team during a boarding training exercise on the USS Miguel Keith, 2023

Boarding is used in wartime as a way to seize a vessel without destroying it, or to remove its cargo (people or goods) before it is destroyed. It can also be used to aid in the collection of naval intelligence, as soldiers boarding a sinking, crippled, or surrendered vessel could possibly recover enemy plans, cipher codebooks or machines. For a boarding to be successful, it must occur without the knowledge of the crew of the defending ship, or the ship's defenses must be suppressed.

In modern warfare, boarding by military forces may involve the use of small submarines or submersibles, inflatable boats or helicopters to carry troops to the deck of the ship, or may simply be carried out by scuba divers scaling the sides of the ship.

== In peacetime ==
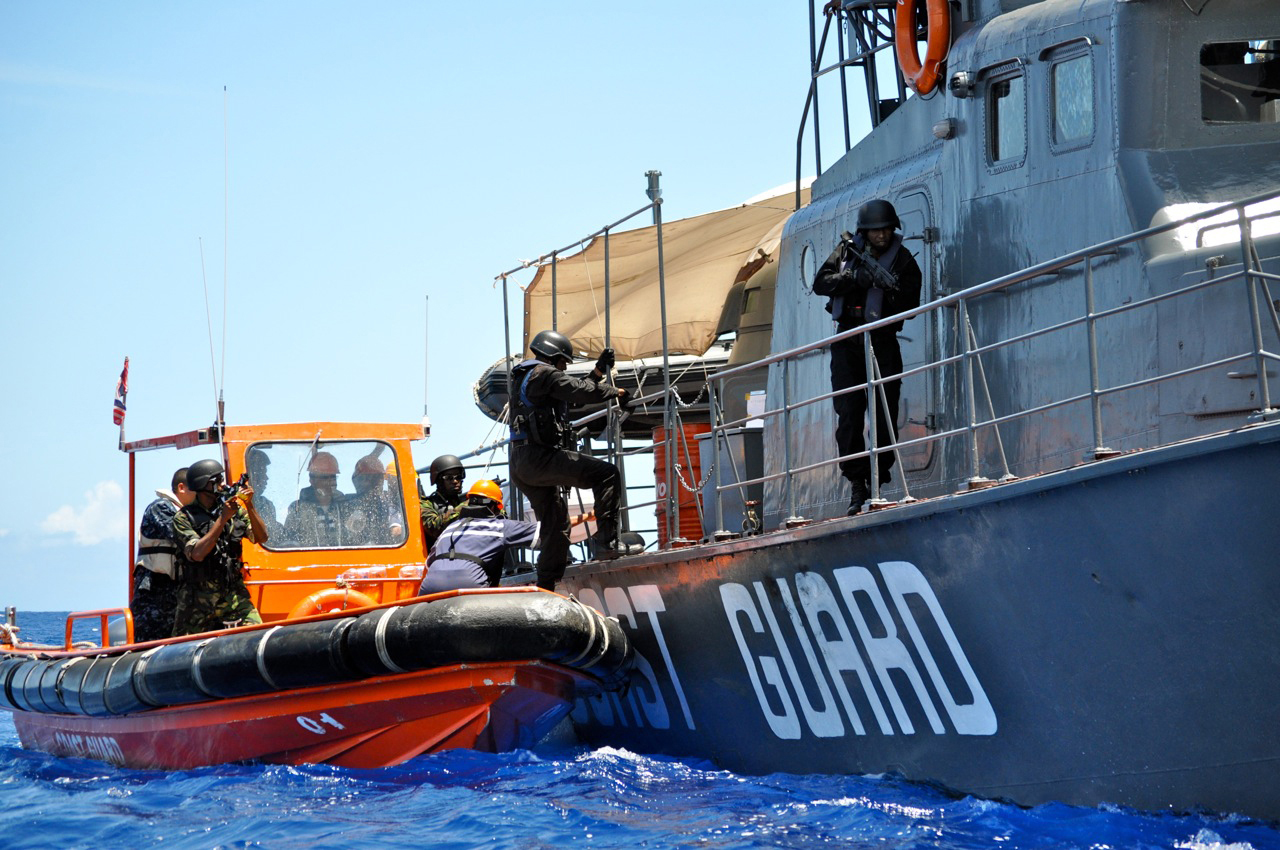
Mauritius Police Force officers boarding a vessel during a US Navy naval boarding drill, 2012

In peacetime, boarding allows authorized inspectors of one nation or group, such as a coast guard or a police force, to examine a ship's cargo in a search for drugs, weapons, passengers which are unrecorded on the ship's manifest, or any other type of contraband that could possibly have been carried aboard. A nation's coast guard could also board any suspicious ships that have been overfishing in such a nation's territorial waters. Air ambulances often deploy paramedics to ships by using typical helicopter boarding procedures.

== History ==
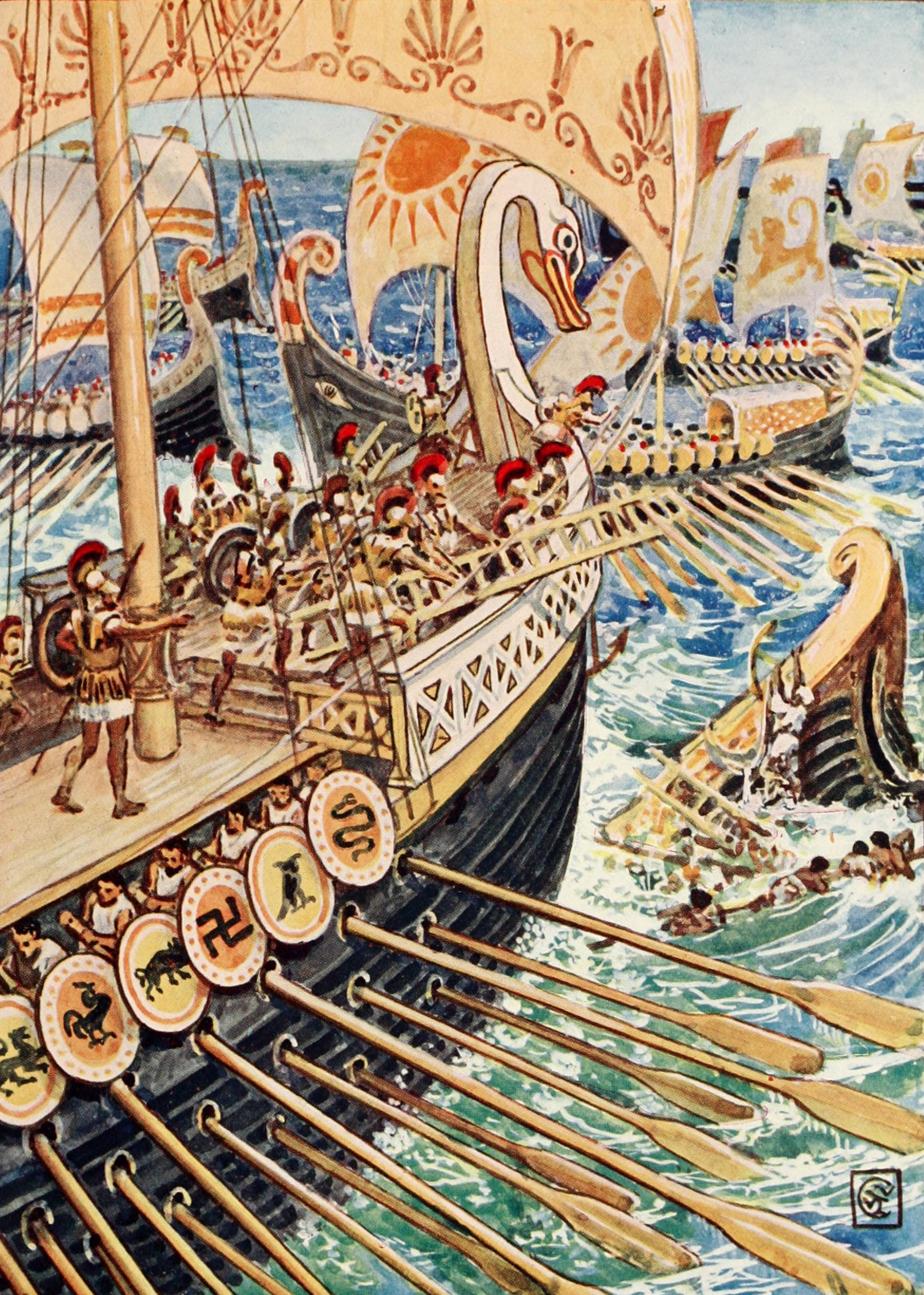
A Greek ship preparing to board Persian ships at the Battle of Salamis

Boarding is the oldest method of securing an opposing ship, as the first cases were depicted when the Sea Peoples and Egyptians fought. For cultures that lack effective shipboard artillery, boarding is the main technique of ship-to-ship combat. However, in the modern era, boarding is still used, particularly when stealth is desired.

In all eras, boarding requires that the ship boarded be stable enough to withstand the impact of enemy personnel leaping or climbing onto the deck and a subsequent sustained fight. The target ship must also have enough deck space for boarders to be able to stand and fight effectively. Thus, Native American war canoes or New Zealand waka were not suitable boarding targets, and wars between sides equipped with such vessels have generally not seen boarding actions, or any other decisive form of ship-to-ship combat. Instead, such vessels were often used for the rapid transportation of troops and supplies, and decisive engagements were normally fought by landing forces.

=== Ancient and post-classical ===
Throughout the ancient and post-classical periods, all naval ship-to-ship combat focused primarily on boarding, although ramming and incendiaries were secondary tactics. Greek and Persian naval tactics emphasized ramming and boarding, notably at the Battle of Salamis.

The earliest Roman naval battles against Carthage also emphasized boarding. Since the Romans were primarily a land-based army, they could not effectively combat the Carthaginian navy, and subsequently lost several sea battles. The corvus, a boarding ramp with a steel spike, was the Roman answer to this problem. Roman sailors piloted their ship alongside a Carthaginian ship, dropped the corvus from one deck to the other, and sent their soldiers across the board, assaulting the ship. The Carthaginian navy, unprepared for this "land combat" on the oceans, lost several ships to this tactic. This invention secured Roman naval dominance in the Mediterranean Sea for several centuries.

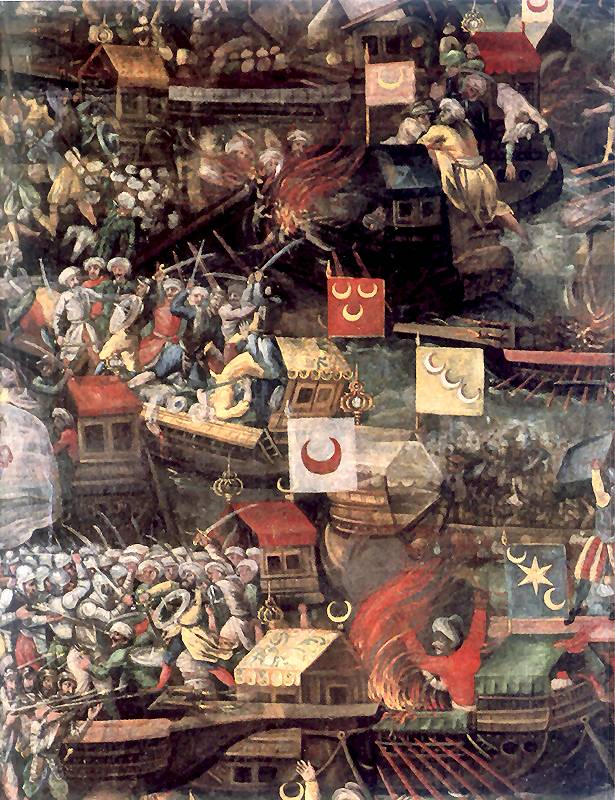
Painting of boarding actions during the Battle of Lepanto

During the medieval period, boarding continued to be the dominant form of ship-to-ship combat. The most prominent naval power of the period, the Vikings, rarely fought other seaborne peoples on the water, but they still depended on boarding on those rare occasions, often lashing their longships together to make a more stable platform for the upcoming battle. The maritime use of Greek fire made Byzantium less dependent on boarding than other medieval powers, but it was still used. To better resist boarding, medieval European ships began to be built with high wooden "castles" fore and aft, which boarders could scale only with great difficulty, while archers, crossbowmen or arquebusiers could sweep the enemy decks.

Naval tactics in medieval China, Korea, and Japan also depended on boarding, with the flat expanse of a ship used as a battleground for the marine contingents. The Battle of Dan-no-ura in 1185 was one of the classic naval battles in medieval Asia to be decided by boarding. Boarding attacks also occurred beyond the medieval era in Asia. During the Imjin Wars in naval operations, both Korean and Japanese marines would attempt to board the other's ships for engagement in hand-to-hand combat. The Japanese used boarding attacks more often because of the imbalance of firepower between the two navies; at the time, the Koreans controlled a much more powerful navy, technically and tactically, than the Japanese. Though the Japanese were armed with the latest in European small firearms, Korean cannons were advanced and among the best in Asia at the time; they were easily able to destroy Japanese ships.

=== Early modern period ===
The development in the early 16th century of shipboard gunports and gun carriages, and the consequent adoption of broadside tactics, gradually ended the primacy of boarding in naval warfare. The decline in boarding occurred faster in Northern and Western Europe than in the Mediterranean. While England and France quickly designed ships with heavy broadsides, the Mediterranean's lighter winds encouraged the Spaniards, Italians and Ottomans to retain the rowed galley, which was difficult to equip with heavy broadsides because the weight and size of the artillery interfered with the oar banks. As late as 1571, the Mediterranean Battle of Lepanto, while influenced by artillery, was still principally a battle determined by boarding.

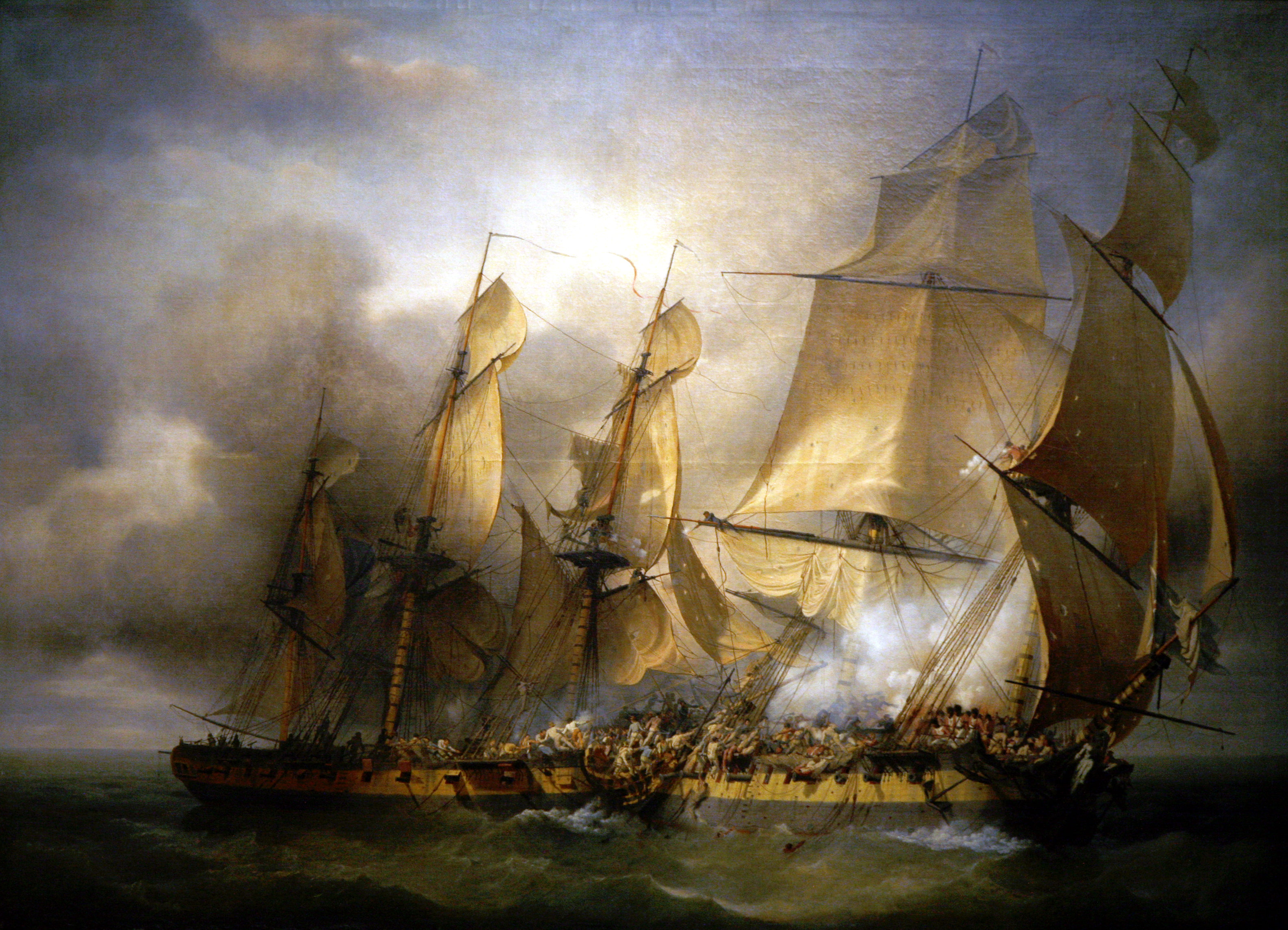
Bayonnaise (left) boarding HMS Ambuscade during the action of 14 December 1798

The defeat of Spain's Great Armada in 1588 struck the death knell for major fleets geared toward boarding. The Spanish galleons were intended primarily for boarding combat, their contingents of boarding soldiers far outnumbering the English and their decks provided with high castles for suppressive fire. But the Armada proved unable to close with the English vessels, partly because the Spanish castles rendered their ships more sluggish, while Drake and Hawkins stood off and bombarded the Spanish from long range, tearing up their rigging and their crews with the superior firepower of their broadsides. This enabled the outnumbered English fleet to avoid being boarded and allowed them to prevent a Spanish landing.

While boarding would never again be the dominant tactic in Western naval warfare, it was not abandoned. Boarding was still used as the coup de grace against a crippled ship, enabling the victimized vessel to be recovered and used by the boarders' side rather than being sunk. Important information such as enemy plans, ciphers or rutters might also be recovered. Large quantities of soldiers were consigned to transports rather than "pestering" the decks of warships, but smaller units of specialized marines were kept aboard to aid in boarding (as well as to enforce naval discipline). Sailors themselves were now expected to play the major role in boarding combat.

Boarding was of particular importance in the 17th and 18th centuries' guerre de course, or commerce raiding, as well as to privateers and pirates. Because naval crews were paid prize money for bringing back enemy merchant shipping and cargoes intact, it was preferable to capture such ships rather than sink them, which ultimately required boarding, with or without a preliminary artillery duel. Privateers and pirates found boarding even more necessary, as both depended entirely on capturing merchant vessels for their livelihood, under the wageless system of "no purchase, no pay."

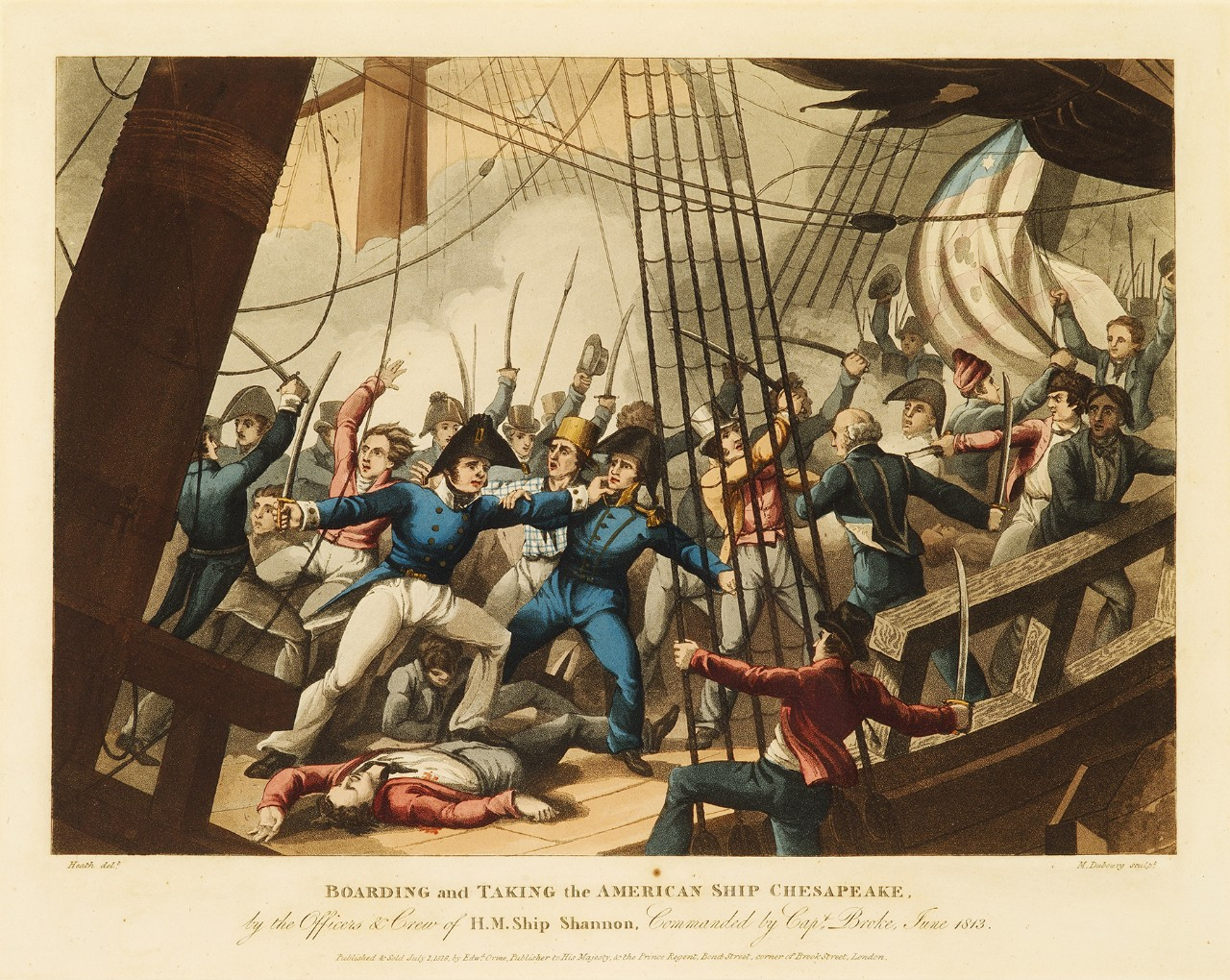
Illustration of the British boarding and capturing USS Chesapeake

There were two chief techniques of boarding in the Age of Sail. One was to bring the two ships close enough to actually jump from friendly gunwale to enemy deck, with grappling hooks and lines helping to keep the vessels side by side. The second technique was to place a boarding party onto a dory, gig, or another type of small boat, row it alongside the target, and then climb aboard by using grappling hooks or the steps built into some ship's sides. The cinematic method of throwing a grappling line into the enemy's rigging or yards and then swinging aboard does not appear to have any historical support; it could hardly have been practical, as it would put a soldier within range of a large group of hostile combatants extremely quickly. In addition, it would be hard for large numbers sufficient to overwhelm the other ship's defenses to be brought onto the deck in this fashion.

Boarding in the Age of Sail was more difficult and dangerous than in previous eras of open-decked sailing vessels. Defenders could seek cover in "closed quarters" in the ship's roundhouse or foredeck, shooting through small loopholes at the exposed boarders. The defenders could also place grenades on their gunwales or dangle them from their yards, detonating them by fuses of quick match that led back through the loopholes into the closed quarters. If not in closed quarters, defenders sometimes resorted to the naval boarding pike, trying to kill or wound boarders while keeping them at a distance, and of course might use any of the weapons that the boarders themselves used.

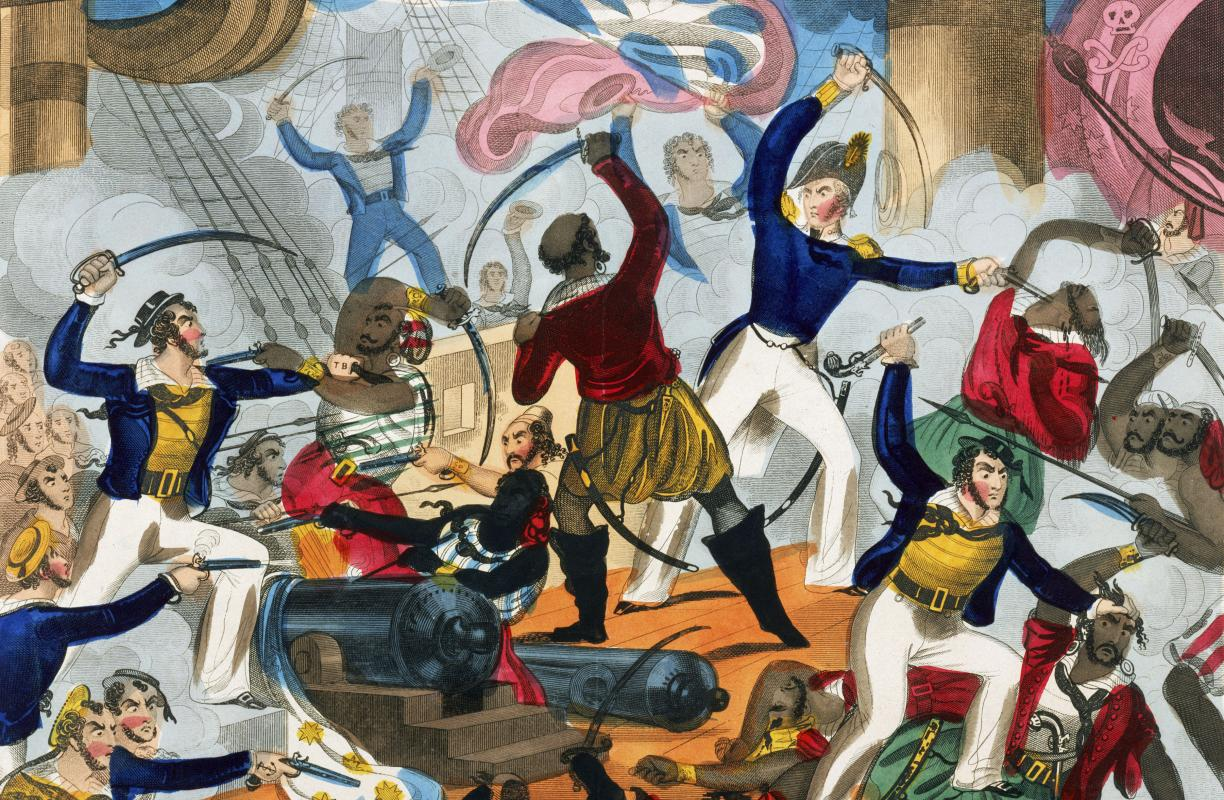
c. 1825 illustration of the Royal Navy boarding a Barbary corsair

Boarding weapons in the Age of Sail consisted of grenades, pistols, blunderbusses, muskets, bayonets, cutlasses, naval boarding axes, and naval boarding pikes, etc. Until the introduction of the percussion cap in the early 19th century, sailors preferred to use flintlocks whenever possible, as the lighted match of a matchlock was extremely dangerous to use on board a ship. Spanish and Portuguese sailors, especially officers, were known to use the rapier throughout the 17th and even into the 18th century, but the close-quarter nature of boarding combat rendered these lengthy swords very ineffective. An important multipurpose weapon was the boarding axe, useful for attacking the enemy, but also essential for chopping down doors and bulkheads to break into closed quarters where defenders of a ship could barricade themselves. The heavy blade could also cut grappling lines.

The continued success throughout the 18th century of boarding tactics in a secondary role is best exemplified by John Paul Jones' assault against HMS Serapis from the sinking USS Bonhomme Richard in 1779, the only known case in the Age of Sail where a ship's captain captured an enemy ship while losing his own. HMS Shannon in turn broke the United States' run of successful frigate battles during the War of 1812 by boarding and capturing USS Chesapeake in 1813.

=== Modern era ===
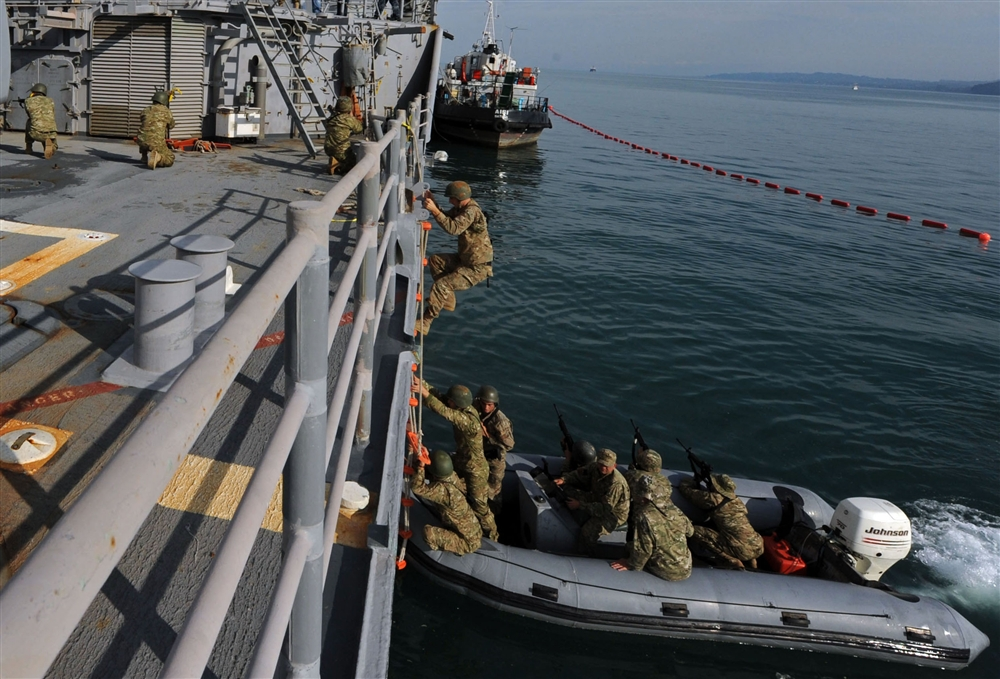
American and Georgian boarding teams assaulting the USS Philippine Sea (CG-58) during a tactical procedure exercise in 2011

The adoption of ironclads and increasingly powerful naval artillery vastly increased the risk to boarding parties. Meanwhile, the suppression of piracy and the abandonment of privateering and prize money made boarding actions even against merchant vessels less rewarding. The massacre of Paraguayan canoe-borne boarding parties by Brazilian ironclads during the Paraguayan War demonstrated the futility of direct assault by boarding in the face of 19th-century technology.

During World War I the Royal Navy created their own type of warship specifically designed for boarding. Several armed boarding steamers were converted from merchant ships and fought in engagements such as the action of 16 March 1917.

For the most part, boarding became a police action in which the attackers came on board only when no resistance could be expected, in order to search vessels and remove contraband. The target would be a ship that had hove to or surrendered. During wartime, the surrendering or sinking ship would be searched for any valuable information such as plans and ciphers. One prominent example would be during World War II, when British vessels crippled the German submarine U-110 in 1941, and sent a crew aboard after the U-boat commander, Kapitänleutnant Fritz-Julius Lemp, gave the order to abandon ship. The British would be rewarded with a fully operational Enigma cipher machine, left behind by the German sailors. On June 4, 1944 a United States Navy task force led by Captain Daniel V. Gallery boarded and captured U-505.

True boarding assaults in the 19th, 20th, and early 21st centuries became extremely rare, generally by small boats or by divers, who entered the target vessel surreptitiously and exploited total surprise to seize control before resistance could be effectively organized. Modern-day pirates in motorboats similarly depend on speed, stealth and surprise to take their targets, usually unarmed and poorly defended, without serious resistance.

However, the use of boarding tactics has begun to revive in recent years, both as part of anti-piracy operations and in conflicts such as the ongoing aftermath of the Libyan Civil War, and the annexation of Crimea by the Russian Federation.

In November 2023, Ansar Allah militants boarded the roll-on/roll-off ship Galaxy Leader in an Mil Mi-17 helicopter and sailed it to Al Hudaydah during their involvement in the Israel–Hamas war. Ansar Allah on 30 December 2023 attempted to board the container ship Maersk Hangzhou but was thwarted by United States Navy ships resulting in the sinking three Ansar Allah boats.

19 April 2026 boarding of M/V Touska

USS Spruance fires on M/V Touska, 19 April 2026. Spruance disabled Touska’s propulsion by firing several rounds from the destroyer’s 5-inch/54-caliber Mark 45 gun into Touska’s engine room.

United States Marines leave amphibious assault ship USS Tripoli (LHA-7) and board M/V Touska, 19 April 2026

== See also ==
- Visit, board, search, and seizure
- Boarding net
