= 2026 United States naval blockade of Iran =

2026 Iran war military action

- Part of the 2026 Strait of Hormuz crisis
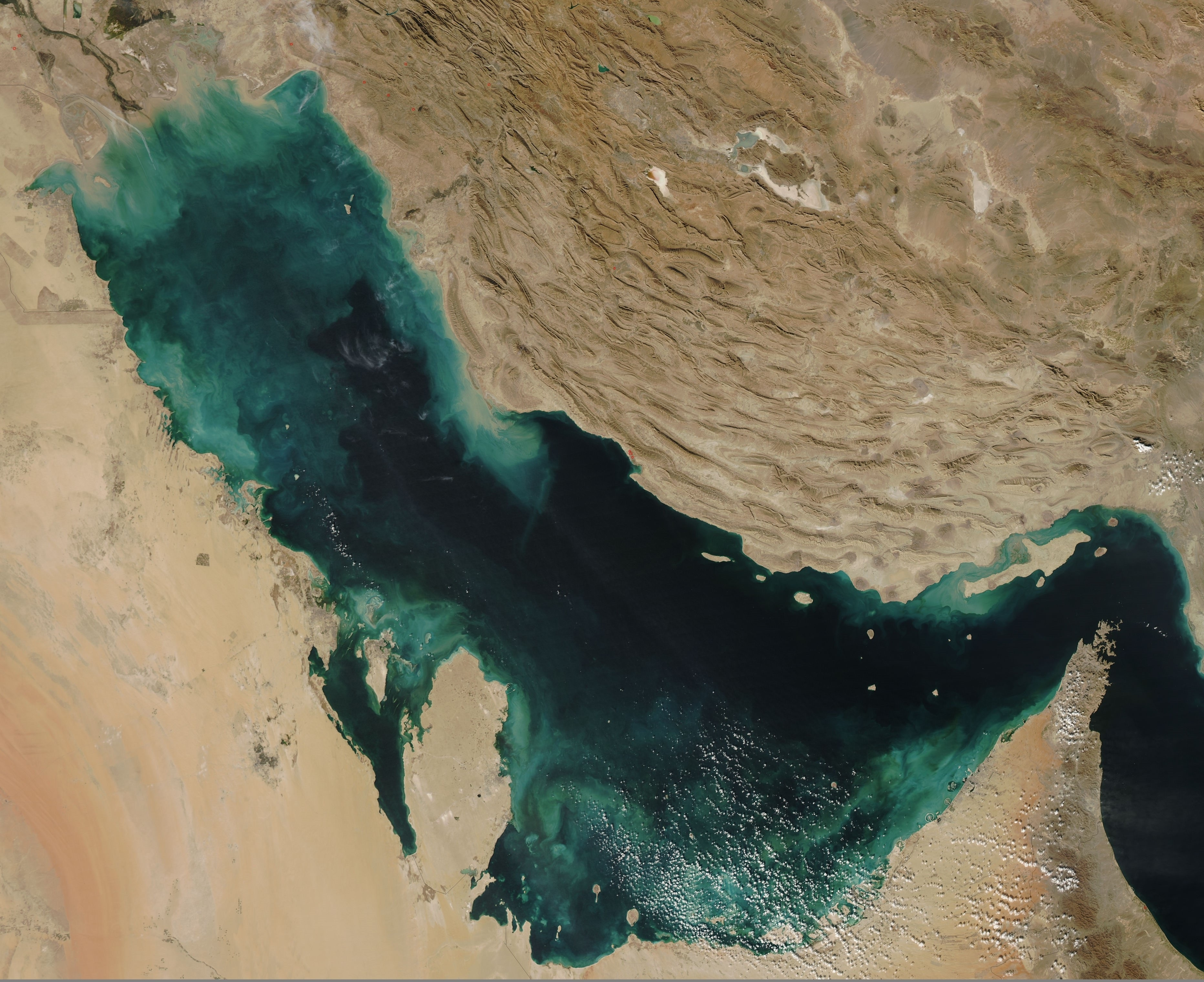
- Satellite view of the Persian Gulf and Strait of Hormuz, which the blockade affects
- Type: Blockade
- Location: Strait of Hormuz and Persian Gulf coast of Iran, Indo-Pacific region
- Commanded by: Donald Trump; Pete Hegseth; Brad Cooper; Samuel Paparo
- Target: Block vessels entering and leaving Iranian ports
- Date: 13 April 2026 – 18 June 2026 (1st) 14 July 2026 – present (2nd)
- Executed by: United States Armed Forces: United States Navy; United States Air Force

On 13 April 2026, the United States imposed a naval blockade on Iran following the failure of the Islamabad Talks to end the 2026 Iran war. The blockade began 10:00 EDT (14:00 GMT) and applied only to ships going to and from Iran. Iran said that it viewed the entry of US military vessels near the Strait of Hormuz as a breach of the ceasefire agreement that had been reached days earlier and that it would respond accordingly. On 22 April, US president Donald Trump claimed that the naval blockade had cost Iran $500 million daily while the US Department of Defense estimated that Iran had lost $4.8 billion in oil revenue by 1 May.

On 17 April, Iran announced that its closure of the Strait of Hormuz, which had been in effect since the start of the war on 28 February, would be paused for the duration of the truce in Lebanon, saying that passage of commercial vessels through the strait would be completely open. On 18 April, Iran said that it had closed the strait again in response to the refusal of the US to lift the naval blockade. By 18 April, the US stated that it had intercepted a total of 23 vessels. Meanwhile, Lloyd's List said that by 20 April at least 26 ships had managed to bypass the US blockade line in both directions (both toward Iranian ports and departing from Iranian ports). On 19 April, the first direct action of the blockade occurred when the 31st Marine Expeditionary Unit and destroyer USS Spruance seized the Iranian-flagged vessel Touska. On 14 June, Trump and Iran announced an agreement to end the war and reopen the Strait of Hormuz. Trump also said that he authorized lifting the US naval blockade. On 17 June, Trump and Iranian president Masoud Pezeshkian signed the memorandum of understanding to end the war, with Trump signing it during dinner with French president Emmanuel Macron at the Palace of Versailles following the G7 summit. On 18 June, CENTCOM announced the removal of the naval blockade of Iranian ports. On 30 June, speaker of the Parliament of Iran Mohammad Bagher Ghalibaf falsely claimed that Iran could not export oil during the US blockade of its ports. (Note: Data from maritime intelligence firm Kpler showed that Iran's crude exports were 260,000 barrels per day in May 2026.)

On 13 July, Trump announced the reinstatement of the blockade with CENTCOM stating that it would start the next day at 20:00 GMT (16:00 EDT). On 14 July, the US reinstated the naval blockade. On 7 September, The Wall Street Journal reported that the naval blockade has halted new Iranian oil exports from the Persian Gulf, leaving Iran reliant on diminishing floating stockpiles from before the blockade's reinstatement in July. Admiral Brad Cooper, commander of CENTCOM, announced on 16 October that the US naval blockade has halted Iran's $25 billion crude oil exports, significantly affecting the IRGC's finances and disrupting salary payments to its regional proxies. Additionally, CENTCOM and the US Department of Treasury have collaborated to freeze approximately $350 million in Iranian cryptocurrency assets.

== Background ==
Before the United States and Israel launched their 2026 war against Iran, the Strait of Hormuz was open and about 25% of the world's seaborne oil trade and 20% of the world's liquefied natural gas passed through it.

On 28 February 2026, the US and Israel launched surprise airstrikes on Iran, targeting military and government sites, as well as assassinating Supreme Leader Ali Khamenei and other Iranian officials, starting the 2026 Iran war. In response, Iran blocked the Strait of Hormuz, prompting the US military to begin a military campaign to reopen it.

On 9 March, US president Donald Trump said that "the war is very complete, pretty much", and claimed that the Iranian military had been destroyed and the Strait of Hormuz had re-opened. He also expressed his interest in seizing control of the waterway from Iran. On 15 March, Trump called for help from NATO and China to re-open the strait and protect shipping, but they declined. He said the US did not need the oil that passed through the strait and suggested "maybe we shouldn't even be there". Iran's foreign minister Abbas Araghchi said the strait was open to all except the US, Israel and their allies. Ten days later, it was reported that Iran was beginning to allow some ships through the strait in exchange for a toll of up to $2 million per ship, as well as allowing passage of some ships owned by China, Russia, India, Iraq, Pakistan, the Philippines, Malaysia and Thailand.

In late March and early April, Trump repeatedly gave ultimatums to Iran, threatening to destroy Iran's infrastructure and "civilization" and bomb it "back to the Stone Ages" if it did not make a deal with the US and re-open the strait. The Iranian Revolutionary Guard Corps responded that the strait "will not be opened to the enemies of this nation through the ridiculous spectacle by the president of the United States".

Trump claimed that 158 vessels belonging to the Iranian naval forces had been destroyed. Consequently, he asserted that only small, high-speed attack boats remained operational. Trump has said that other countries would be involved in enforcing the naval blockade of Iran, but did not specify which ones.

On 8 April 2026, the US and Iran agreed to a temporary two-week ceasefire, which was to involve the re-opening of the strait. However, Iran continued to restrict and control passage through the strait after the Israeli attacks on Lebanon.

During the ceasefire, the US and Iran held negotiations in Islamabad on 11–12 April, which ended without agreement. Following the failure of the talks, Trump said he no longer cared about negotiations. He announced that the US Navy itself would blockade the strait, stopping "any and all Ships trying to enter, or leave, the Strait of Hormuz". However, United States Central Command (CENTCOM) clarified that the blockade would only be enforced on ships travelling to or from Iranian ports.

== Timeline ==
On 13 April 2026, at 10:00 EDT, the US naval blockade of Iran took effect at the direction of Donald Trump and under the command of Admiral Brad Cooper at CENTCOM. According to CENTCOM, the blockade is set to encompass "the entirety of the Iranian coastline," warning that any vessel "entering or departing the blockaded area without authorization is subject to interception, diversion, and capture." President Trump threatened to destroy any fast-attack "ships" of the IRGC Navy in a similar fashion to the strikes carried out against alleged drug traffickers in the Caribbean Sea during Operation Southern Spear.

In the first 24 hours after the blockade took effect on 13 April 2026, CENTCOM reported that over 10,000 US personnel, supported by more than a dozen warships and dozens of aircraft, were enforcing the operation. No vessels attempted to breach the blockade, while six commercial ships complied with orders and were redirected back to Iranian ports. CENTCOM added that "The blockade will be enforced impartially against vessels of all nations entering or departing Iranian ports and coastal areas, including all Iranian ports on the Arabian ‌Gulf and Gulf of Oman. CENTCOM forces will not impede freedom of navigation for vessels transiting the Strait of Hormuz to and from non-Iranian ports."

On 14 April, at least four ships related to Iran crossed the Strait of Hormuz, according to public transponder data viewed by BBC Verify. Those vessels later stopped or turned around, after presumed interception by US forces, according to shipping data firms and the Sydney Morning Herald. On the same day, a US official stated that a total of eight oil tankers entering or leaving Iranian ports had been intercepted since the start of the blockade. All tankers complied with directions to reverse course and no boarding was necessary. Tankers departing from the Chabahar Port were contacted by a US destroyer, while Boeing P-8 Poseidon patrol aircraft were also used to intercept tankers. By 15 April, CENTCOM stated that 10 vessels had been turned around and no ships had broken through since the start of the US blockade.

On 16 April, Chairman of the Joint Chiefs of Staff, General Dan Caine, held a press conference with Secretary of Defense Pete Hegseth. They clarified that the blockade is on the ports and coastline of Iran rather than the Strait of Hormuz, and that enforcement will also occur in other areas. It was announced that the United States Indo-Pacific Command under Admiral Samuel Paparo would begin conducting interdiction activities against ships that left Iran before the blockade. They also stated that the number of vessels intercepted by US forces had risen to 13, but all so far had complied with US directions. By 18 April, the number had risen to 23.

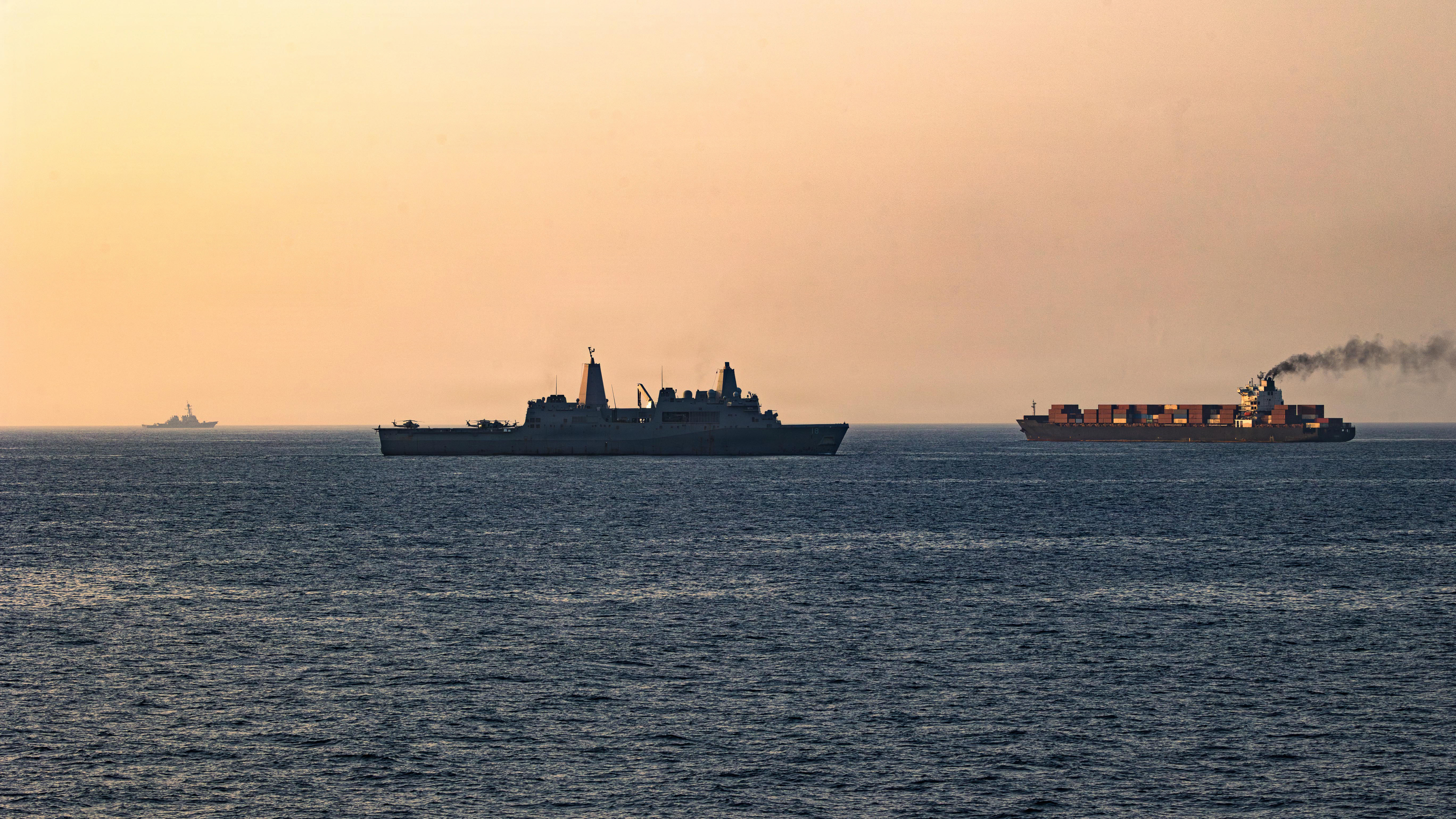
U.S. Navy ships intercepting Touska

By 17 April, Lloyd's List reported that eight Iranian vessels had managed to evade the blockade and cross westward into the Gulf of Oman to reach Iran. The vessels were headed for Iranian ports and at least one had managed to reach Bandar Abbas by 16 April. Two sanctioned oil supertankers had also crossed the US blockade line but did not indicate their destination to mask their route.

On 19 April, the US seized the Iran-flagged cargo ship Touska after it attempted to breach the blockade. The vessel, almost 900 feet (270 m) long, was en route to Bandar Abbas. It was warned by the guided missile destroyer USS Spruance over a six-hour period before the destroyer fired several rounds from its 5-inch/54-caliber Mark 45 gun into the engine room, disabling it. It was then seized by the 31st Marine Expeditionary Unit in the Gulf of Oman. Iran retaliated against the seizure by launching attack drones at U.S. ships, although no damage was reported. According to Reuters, the seized ship was probably carrying equipment that the US considered "dual-use," meaning that it had equipment that could be used by the Iranian army.

On 20 April, it was reported by Lloyd's List that at least 26 Iranian ships had successfully bypassed the American blockade, including 11 tankers with Iranian cargo that managed to exit the Gulf of Oman. On the same day, CENTCOM announced that the number of intercepted ships had risen to 27.

Overnight on 21 April, US forces boarded the stateless oil tanker MT Tifani in the INDOPACOM operational region, stating that it was linked to Iranian smuggling. The vessel had loaded oil from Kharg Island earlier in the month but left before the blockade. On 22 April, the US said that it had intercepted a total of 29 ships.

By 22 May, the US had turned 94 vessels away, according to CENTCOM.

On 11 June, India's Shipping Minister Sarbananda Sonowal stated that three Indian soldiers were killed by an attack by the US military attack on an oil tanker in the Gulf of Oman.

On 14 June, Trump and Iran announced that they had reached an agreement to end the war and reopen the Strait of Hormuz. Trump also said that he had authorized the lifting of the US naval blockade. The US military later clarified that the blockade remains in effect until the agreement is signed on 19 June. On 17 June, Trump and Iranian president Masoud Pezeshkian signed the memorandum of understanding to end the war, with Trump signing the document during dinner with French president Emmanuel Macron at the Palace of Versailles after the G7 summit. On 18 June, CENTCOM announced that it had removed the naval blockade of Iranian ports.

On 13 July, Trump announced that the US will reinstate the blockade. On 15 July, CENTCOM said that the US reinstated the naval blockade day before. During the first 24 hours of the renewed blockade, the US military said it had rerouted two vessels and disabled a third. The disabled vessel, the empty Curaçao-flagged oil tanker Belma, was struck in the Persian Gulf by Hellfire missiles on its smokestack after ignoring US warnings while attempting to reach Kharg Island, according to CENTCOM. On 16 July, CENTCOM said that the 11th Marine Expeditionary Unit boarded the oil tanker Wen Yao in the Gulf of Oman to verify its compliance with the blockade. On 17 July, Belma was reportedly struck again by US missiles while docked at Kharg Island. On 24 July, CENTCOM said that the US struck and disabled the Mozambique-flagged tanker Lavine in the Gulf of Oman after the vessel allegedly attempted to breach the blockade four times. The following day, CENTCOM said that it boarded the Comoros-flagged tanker Charminar to verify its compliance with the blockade, while the number of vessels redirected since the blockade began rose to 12.

On 11 August, CENTCOM said that a US Navy helicopter-fired missile disabled the Panama-flagged container ship Vela Nova in the Gulf of Oman after it attempted to breach the blockade. It added that the US had redirected 55 vessels since the blockade resumed. By 12 September, CENTCOM said that the number of ships redirected surpassed 100. On 10 October, CENTCOM said that the Panama-flagged cargo ship Ocean Molica was struck on its stern and disabled by a US jet in the Gulf of Oman, after it attempted to enter regional waters from an Iranian port. It added that 135 vessels had been diverted since 14 July. Admiral Brad Cooper, the commander of CENTCOM, declared on 16 October, that the naval blockade had stopped Iran from exporting $25 billion worth of crude oil, severely straining the IRGC's finances and interfering with salary payments to its regional proxies. Cooper added that CENTCOM and the US Department of Treasury had worked together to freeze about $350 million in Iranian cryptocurrency holdings.

On 7 November, the US struck the St. Kitts and Nevis-flagged bulk carrier Huda on its stern, disabling it. The following day, CENTCOM announced the launch of Task Force Iron Gate, which is based in Tampa, Florida, and aims to prevent the transfer of arms and sanctioned materials to and from Iran through its land borders and the Caspian Sea.

== Reactions ==
=== Iran ===
Iran condemned the planned blockade and said it would be illegal and constitute piracy. An Iranian army statement said that if the security of Iran's "ports in the waters of the Persian Gulf and the Arabian Sea is threatened, no port in the Persian Gulf and the Arabian Sea will be safe."

On 17 April, Iran announced that passage of commercial vessels through the Hormuz Strait was completely open during the truce in Lebanon. President Trump later clarified that the US blockade against vessels departing from or docking at Iranian ports would still remain in effect, despite this development. The decision to continue the blockade would result in Iran cancelling the reopening of the Strait of Hormuz, with video footage also showing ships turning away from the Strait. On 18 April, Iran said that it closed the Strait of Hormuz again in response to the US refusing to lift its naval blockade, while accusing the US of a 'ceasefire violation' after the US seized an Iranian ship and promising a response. Iranian foreign minister Abbas Araghchi called the US blockade an 'act of war.' An advisor of Mohammad Bagher Ghalibaf said that Iran should respond to the blockade with a military response.

Amir Saeid Iravani asked UN secretary-general António Guterres to intervene regarding the US's seizure of the Toska, claiming that it was a clear ceasefire violation.

=== International ===
Israeli prime minister Benjamin Netanyahu expressed support for the naval blockade on Iran.

China condemned the blockade as "irresponsible and dangerous" and said that it "would go against the international community’s interests". The Chinese foreign ministry spokesman Guo Jiakun said the actions would only "exacerbate tensions and undermine the already fragile ceasefire agreement" and urged "relevant parties to honor the ceasefire agreement". Russia condemned the blockade and warned of an "economic earthquake." Spain's defense minister Margarita Robles additionally stated that the blockade "makes no sense," and that "since this war started, nothing makes sense."

Additionally, the United Kingdom, Australia, and the European Union expressed their lack of support for the plan, instead favoring de-escalation and freedom of navigation in the Strait of Hormuz. The United Kingdom and France have promoted an alternative task force of a "multinational mission" to open the strait.

== Alternative routes ==
Iran has significant land borders with Iraq, Turkey, Afghanistan, Pakistan, Turkmenistan, Azerbaijan, and Armenia. In 2024, millions of liters of Iranian oil was smuggled into Pakistan by land every day, traffic that added up to more than $1 billion annually.

At least 40% of Iran's exports are oil, as of 2023. Of the non-oil exports, about one-third is shipped out of Iran via land or air.

Prior to the 8 April 2026 ceasefire, the Israeli Air Force bombed Iranian naval installations in the Caspian Sea, resulting in claims that Israel had effectively barred Iran's seaborne trade with Caspian Sea bordering countries. On 14 April, professor Christopher Clary said Iran maintained access via the Caspian Sea to Russia and Kazakhstan.

Samir Madani, co-founder of TankerTrackers, said that a large Iranian oil tanker named HUGE had successfully avoided the US blockade by remaining very close to the Pakistani and Indian coasts until reaching the Strait of Malacca. Madani also suggested Iranian tankers may attempt to run the blockade in the future once "they have built up even further storage near the border with Pakistan."

== Economic impact ==
The US blockade was expected to harm Iran's economy and further raise oil prices. Global oil supplies could also be disrupted if Iran retaliated against the blockade by attempting to close off the Bab al-Mandeb.

In the last 20 years, oil sales have declined in importance as Iran has moved to diversify its economy. Oil exports are crucial for Iran's economy, constituting more than 40% of its export revenue in 2023. Of the remaining exports, about one-third are shipped via land or air.

According to an analyst from the Foundation for the Defense of Democracies, the blockade costs Iran a loss of US$400 million in revenue per day and threatens the permanent damage or destruction of oil wells due to overflow if not ended by 26 April.

A total blockade of Iranian oil would remove two million barrels of Iranian oil each day from the market, though the increase from this factor alone would be "moderate", according to the Brookings Institution.

The US Department of Defense estimated that Iran had lost $4.8 billion in oil revenue from 13 April to 1 May due to the blockade, with a total of 31 tankers laden with 53 million barrels of Iranian oil being "stuck in the Gulf".

On 19 August, Central Bank of Iran governor Abdolnaser Hemmati stated that Iran oil exports had effectively ceased, according to Mehr News Agency.

In September 2026, The Wall Street Journal reported that the blockade completely halted new Iranian oil exports from the Persian Gulf. It also stated that Iran is currently surviving on floating stockpiles that left before the blockade was reinstated in July.

By September 2026, the blockade had worsened the economic crisis of Iran with inflation reaching 70%. Euronews reported that replacing sea routes with land transport has been challenging due to higher costs and delays. The lack of spare parts and rising maintenance costs has also affected the transportation industry.

== Summary of seizures ==
=== Seizures by the United States ===
No.	Vessel	IMO number	Size	Date	Location	Cargo (mil. bbl)	Notes and sources
1	Touska	9328900	Panamax	19 April 2026	Gulf of Oman	N/A (Boxship)	Intercepted by USS Spruance; propulsion disabled by 5-inch gun fire.
2	Tifani	9273337	VLCC	21 April 2026	Indian Ocean	1.9	
3	Majestic X	9198317	VLCC	23 April 2026	Indian Ocean	1.9	
4	LENORE	9259367	VLCC	5 June 2026	Indian Ocean	1.9	

=== Ships sunk by the United States ===
No.	Vessel	IMO number	Size	Date	Location	Cargo (mil. bbl)	Notes and sources
1	KYLO	9189146	Suezmax	6 September 2026	Gulf of Oman	empty	
2	RIESCO	9251822	Aframax	9 September 2026	Gulf of Oman	empty	

=== Seizures by Iran ===
In retaliation, Iran seized two international cargo ships that were transiting near the Strait of Hormuz, the MSC-Francesca (Liberia-flagged) and the Epaminodes (Panama-flagged).

== Analysis ==
Alex Vatanka, director of the Iran program at the Middle East Institute, warned that Iran cannot sustain current U.S. blockades, which he described as an existential threat capable of suffocating the economy; consequently, he noted that further escalation is increasingly likely. Analysts believe that although Iran might not be able to break the blockade through war, it can increase the economic and political costs for the US of maintaining it and raise the risk of a regional clash.

== See also ==
- Blockade of the Gaza Strip
- 2026 Strait of Hormuz campaign
- 2026 Strait of Hormuz crisis
- Economic impact of the 2026 Iran war
- 2025–2026 United States oil blockade of Venezuela
