= Defense of the cutter Eagle =

Battle of the War of 1812

- Part of the War of 1812
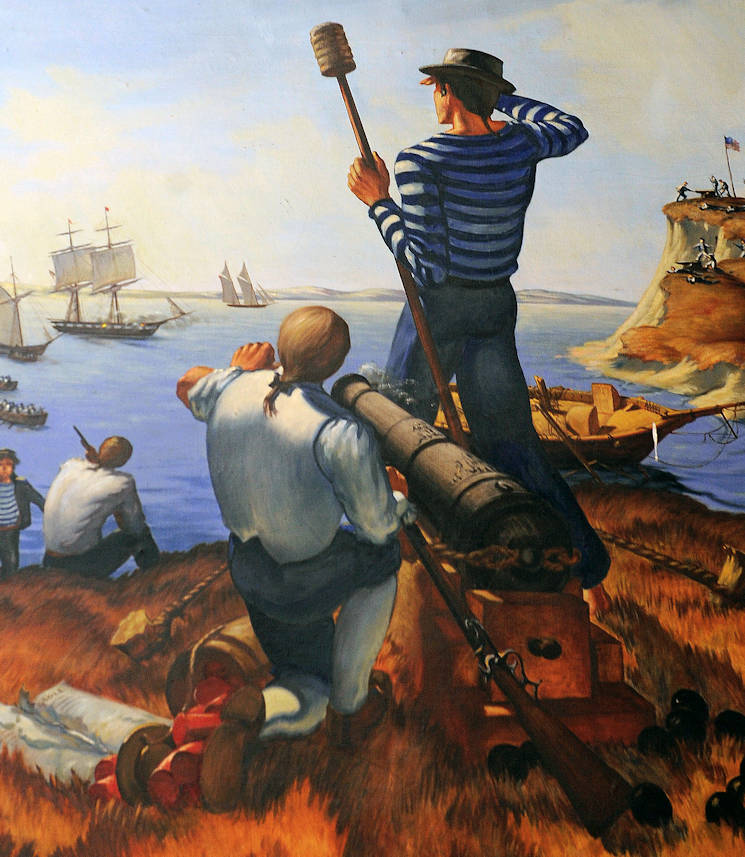
- Defense of the Cutter Eagle, a painting by the Works Progress Administration
Date	October 10–13, 1814
Location	Long Island, United States 40°58′39″N 72°35′46″W
Result	British victory

Belligerents
United States	United Kingdom

Commanders and leaders
Frederick Lee; John Davis	J. R. Lumley

Units involved
United States Revenue Marine: USRC Eagle; Connecticut State Militia: Detached troops; Irregular forces: Villagers of Wading River; Long Island Sea Fencibles (unconfirmed)	Royal Navy: HMS Narcissus; HMS Dispatch; Liverpool Packet

Casualties and losses
1 injured USRC Eagle captured	1 injured
- Location of the battle off of Long Island, New York

The defense of the cutter Eagle was a battle on and around Long Island New York, that took place from October 10 to 13, 1814, between the British Royal Navy and the United States' Revenue Marine. Early on in the engagement, the United States' only involved vessel, USRC Eagle, was beached near Negro Head. Despite the loss of their ship, her crew continued fighting the Royal Navy vessels from shore using cannon recovered from their wrecked vessel. Eagle's crew was ultimately able to repair and refloat her, but unsuccessful in their attempts to drive the British ships away. Once more she was beached, but after exhausting their ammunition over three days of fighting, the Eagle's crew was unable to prevent her from being towed off by the Royal Navy, which then sailed her back past the shoreline for a victory lap. Though there were no fatalities on either side in the battle, a cow grazing in the area died after being hit by a 32-pound (15 kg) round shot fired by one of the Royal Navy ships.

USRC Eagle, along with two of the involved British ships HMS Narcissus and HMS Dispatch, are among six vessels celebrated in the lyrics of "Semper Paratus", the service march of the Revenue Marine's successor force, the U.S. Coast Guard.

== Background ==
At the outset of the War of 1812, the United States' diminutive naval forces consisted of 30 armed ships, 16 of which were sailed by the United States Navy with the remainder operated by the United States Revenue Marine. Throughout the war, ships of the Revenue Marine suffered from poor provisioning, the United States Department of the Treasury, to whom the force answered, insisting that the war was not its responsibility to fight—except in cases where tax collection was threatened—and that any extra appropriations needed to bring Revenue Marine cutters up to battle-ready condition should come out of the Department of the Navy's budget.

On May 26, 1813, the United Kingdom announced the closure of New York harbor and Long Island Sound to almost all outgoing shipping, the closure to be enforced by means of a blockade. The blockade was not total; American merchantmen carrying certain foodstuffs to Europe were issued transit passes by the Baron Hotham due to the British Army's provisioning needs for its forces engaged in Spain during the concurrent War of the Sixth Coalition. Nonetheless, by 1814, according to historian Melvin Jackson, the entire American seaboard "lay all but deserted" to maritime traffic leaving the United States essentially cut-off from the rest of the world.

The American cutter Eagle, the second Revenue Marine ship to bear that name, was a 130-ton schooner outfitted with six cannon and sailing with a normal complement of twenty-five. Home ported in New Haven, Connecticut, she was under the command of Frederick Lee.

== The battle ==
=== Prelude ===
On October 9, 1814, the American packet ship Susan left New York bound for New Haven, Connecticut, hugging the coast so as to avoid violating the British blockade. The next morning she was approached by a similarly sized vessel which—once within gun range—ran up the British colors and ordered Susan to surrender, which she promptly did. This vessel, the Liverpool Packet, was a British privateer operating under command of the nearby frigate HMS Pomone. The seizure of Susan was witnessed by another ship in the area which made for land to raise the alarm.

=== Engagement ===
Upon being informed of the seizure of Susan, Lee ordered USRC Eagle to put to sea to find and rescue the American packet boat. Several volunteers from local companies of the Connecticut State Militia offered to join the voyage and were taken aboard, the senior officer among them being Captain John Davis. By this point, five hours had passed and Eagle left the port of New Haven as dark was settling. As the sun rose the next day, Eagle found herself "dangerously close" to the 18-gun brig HMS Dispatch, which launched its barges in an apparent attempt to board the smaller Eagle. Eagle opened fired on the barges while attempting to withdraw, but the cutter was unable to pick up enough wind to outsail the approaching Royal Navy vessels.

By or before 8:15 a.m., according to HMS Dispatch's log, Lee had maneuvered Eagle towards Negro Head on Long Island and beached her, his intent as later explained being to put the ship in shallow enough water that the larger Dispatch could not follow. However, Dispatch and her barges continued their advance and, at 9:00 a.m., the British ship dropped anchor and began firing on the beached American cutter. To protect the ship, Lee ordered his crew to salvage Eagle's guns, which were hauled to the top of a nearby bluff and from there began returning fire against Dispatch in an effort to drive her away. Eagle's crew were joined by civilian volunteers from Wading River, New York. (Note: There is some dispute as to whether Eagle's guns were actually removed from the vessel or whether the crew in fact commandeered coastal artillery pieces already in place on the cliffs. The log of Dispatch records that a battery was already positioned on the bluff when Eagle beached, though no documentary record supports the presence of coastal artillery on Long Island. However, it is known that a covert and irregular American military unit, the Long Island Sea Fencibles, was operational in the area, what Jackson describes as a "shadowy ... mobile striking force ... designed to oppose enemy landings along the desolate shores of Long Island". Jackson has suggested it is possible this force had already mobilized its gun batteries upon spotting Royal Navy vessels in the area.)

Over the course of the next day HMS Dispatch continued to trade fire with Eagle's crew. According to a popular account of the battle, Eagle's crew, having exhausted all available ammunition, began scavenging Dispatch's spent cannonballs to fire back at her. Another account of the battle, published in the New York Evening Post, reported that:

Having expended all the wadding of the four-pounders on the hill, during the warmest of the firing, several of the crew volunteered and went on board the cutter to obtain more. At this moment the masts were shot away, when the brave volunteers erected a flag upon her stern; this was soon shot away, but was immediately replaced by a heroic tar, amidst the cheers of his undaunted comrades, which was returned by a whole broadside from the enemy. When the crew of the cutter had expended all their large shot and fixed ammunition, they tore up the log book to make cartridges and returned the enemy's small shot which lodged in the hull.

On October 12 Dispatch abandoned the battle and left the area to find reinforcements. The Connecticut State Militia troops, meanwhile, having run out of powder for their muskets and deciding they could be of no more assistance to the Revenue Marine, left to book passage on a schooner returning to Connecticut.

The temporary respite in the fighting allowed Lee the opportunity to repair and re-float the damaged Eagle. Barely had the ship made open water, however, when it again encountered Dispatch, which had returned with the Liverpool Packet and the 32-gun frigate HMS Narcissus. Again, Eagle retreated and was beached, her crew moving to the shore to direct musket fire against British barges attempting to attach tow cables to her. By noon on October 13, the Royal Navy had managed to take Eagle under tow and withdrew from the area after first sailing back past Negro Head for a victory lap, or what Jackson describes as an attempt "to mock the efforts of the late defenders of the Eagle".

=== The fleets ===
==== American ====
Ship	Type	Displacement	Armament
USRC Eagle	Schooner	130 tons	6 guns

==== British ====
Ship	Type	Burthen	Armament
HMS Narcissus	Frigate	90890/94	32 guns
HMS Dispatch	Brig	N/A	18 guns
Liverpool Packet	Schooner	N/A	5 guns

== Aftermath ==
The second verse of the U.S. Coast Guard march "Semper Paratus" mentions six ships, three of which – USRC Eagle, HMS Dispatch, and HMS Narcissus – were involved in the battle.

There were only two casualties reported in the battle, one on each side, and no fatalities. In addition, a calf grazing near the scene of the fight died after being hit by a 32 pound (15 kg) round shot fired by HMS Dispatch.

Despite the United States loss, Frederick Lee and the Eagle's crew were celebrated in American newspapers of the day.

Lee returned to military service as captain of a new cutter also named Eagle, the third Revenue Marine ship to bear that name. After retirement, he was elected to the Connecticut General Assembly.

== Legacy ==
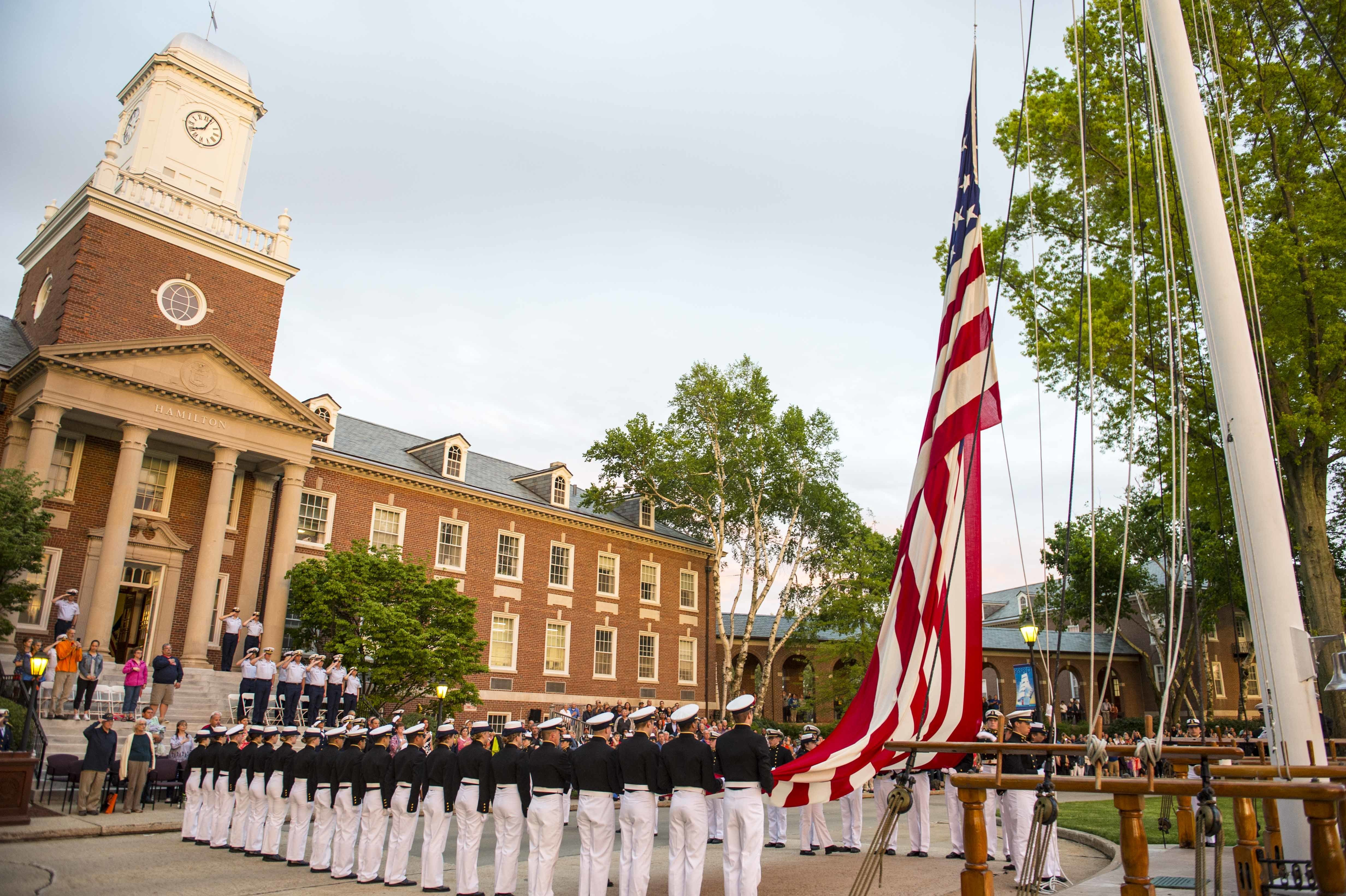
The defense of cutter Eagle is depicted in a mural displayed at Hamilton Hall (pictured) at the U.S. Coast Guard Academy.

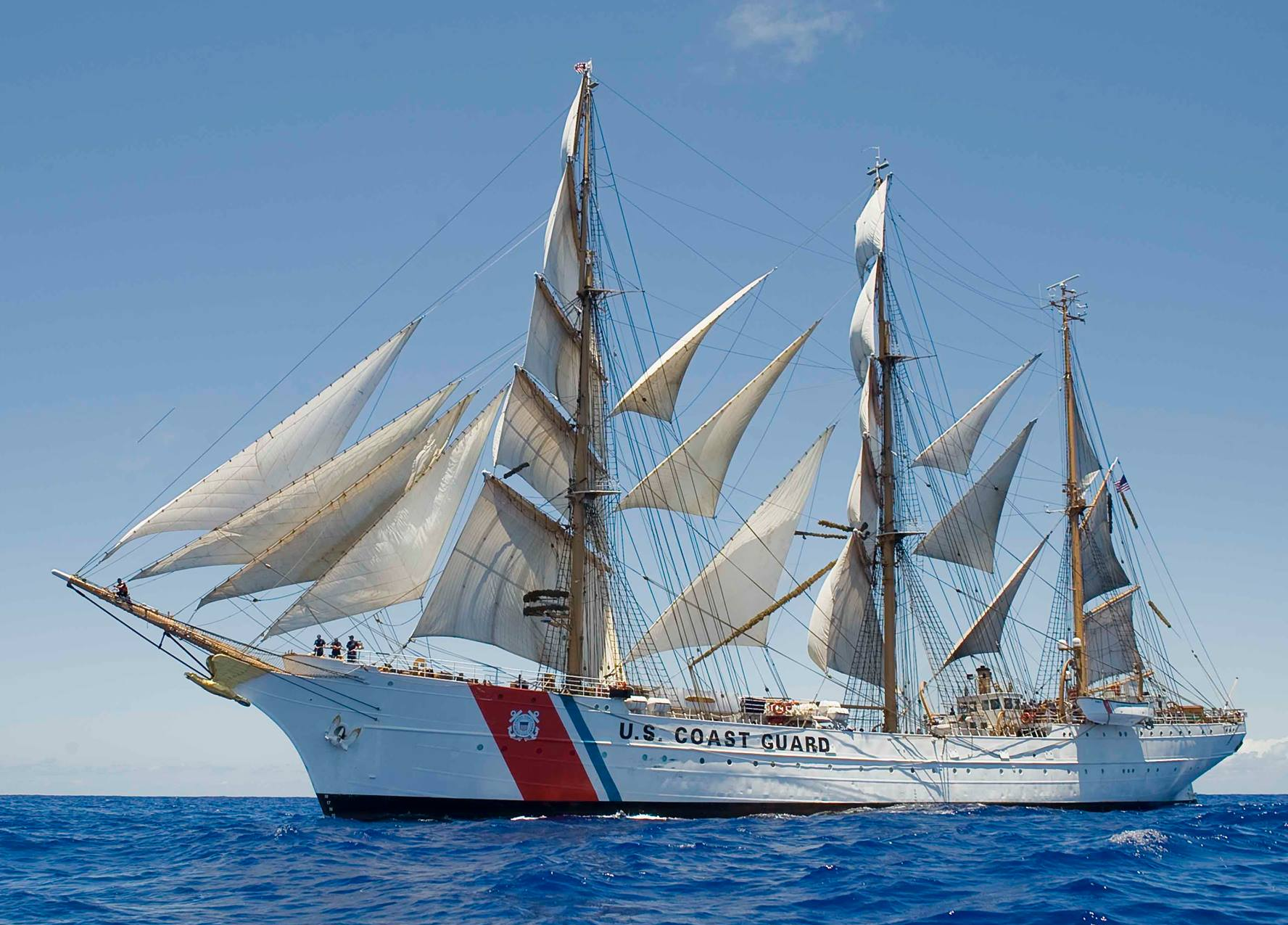
The U.S. Coast Guard flagship USCGC Eagle perpetuates the Eagle name on the Coast Guard register.

Defense of the Cutter Eagle is one panel in a larger mural depicting the Revenue Marine and Coast Guard's battles displayed inside Hamilton Hall at the United States Coast Guard Academy. It is one of two paintings commissioned by the Coast Guard of the battle, neither of which are considered accurate, the mural showing an unrealistic representation of the geography of Negro Head and the other work omitting the presence of the Connecticut soldiers.

In 2014, during bicentennial observances of the War of 1812, the Hallockville Museum Farm in Riverhead, New York, organized a reenactment of the battle.

As of 2019 USCGC Eagle (formerly the Kriegsmarine ship Horst Wessel), a Gorch Fock-class barque, perpetuates the name Eagle on the Coast Guard ship register.

Three of the ships involved in the battle, Eagle as well as Narcissus and Dispatch, are among the six legendary vessels celebrated in the second verse of the Coast Guard march "Semper Paratus":

Surveyor and Narcissus,
The Eagle and Dispatch,
The Hudson and the Tampa,
These names are hard to match;
From Barrow's shores to Paraguay,
Great Lakes or Ocean's wave,
The Coast Guard fights through storms and winds
To punish or to save.

== See also ==
- USRC Surveyor, another Revenue Marine ship defeated by HMS Narcissus
