= Boarding net =

Rope net used to prevent unwanted boardings of ships

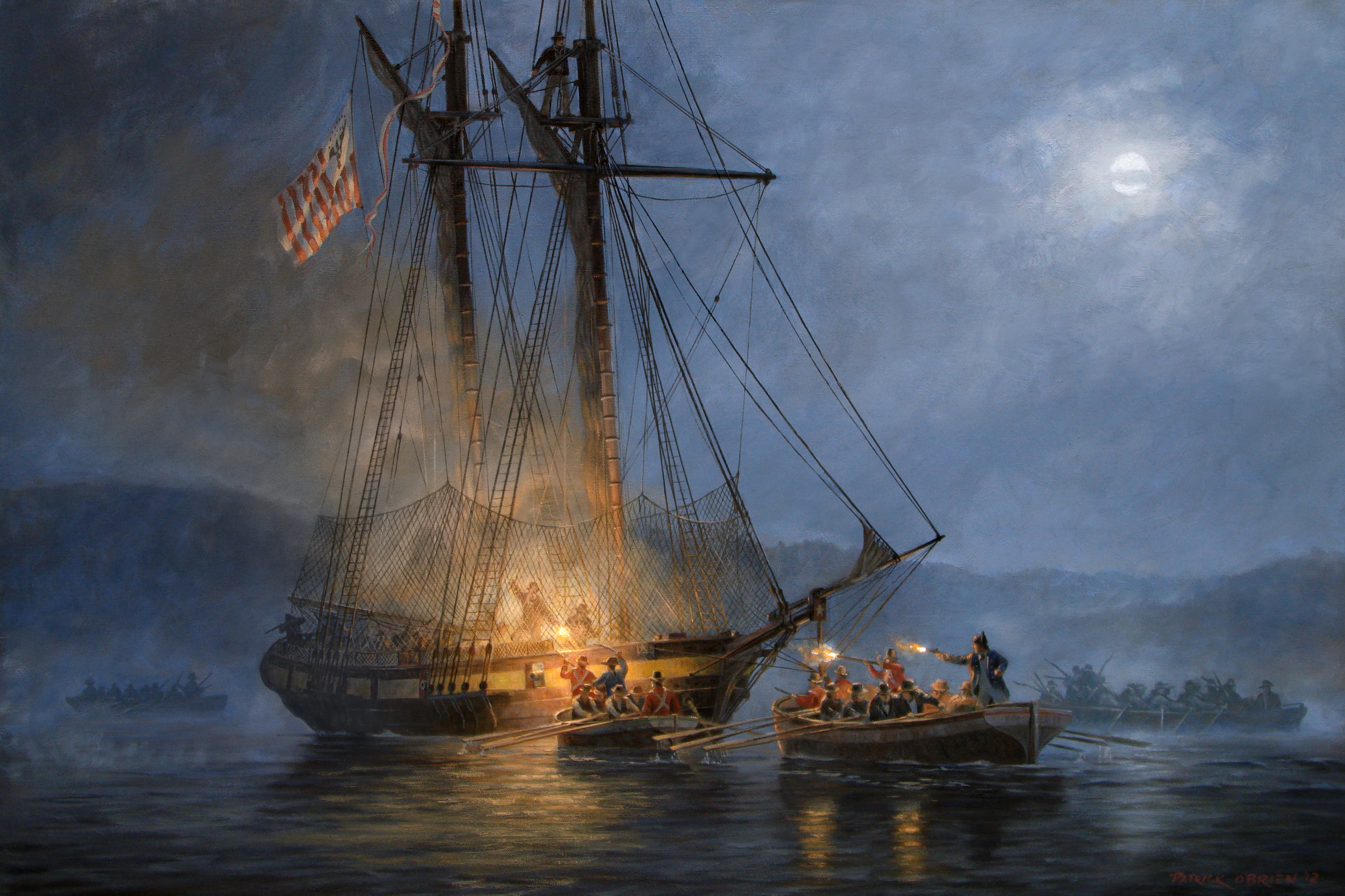
USRC Surveyor with a boarding net raised on 12 June 1813 as a Royal Navy cutting out party closes in

A boarding net is a type of rope net used by ships during the Age of Sail to prevent boarding by hostile forces. Designed to hang from a ship's masts and encircle its deck, the boarding net could be deployed during battle or at night when a ship was at anchor in unknown or hostile waters. In the Royal Navy, boarding nets first gained widespread use in the 1790s.

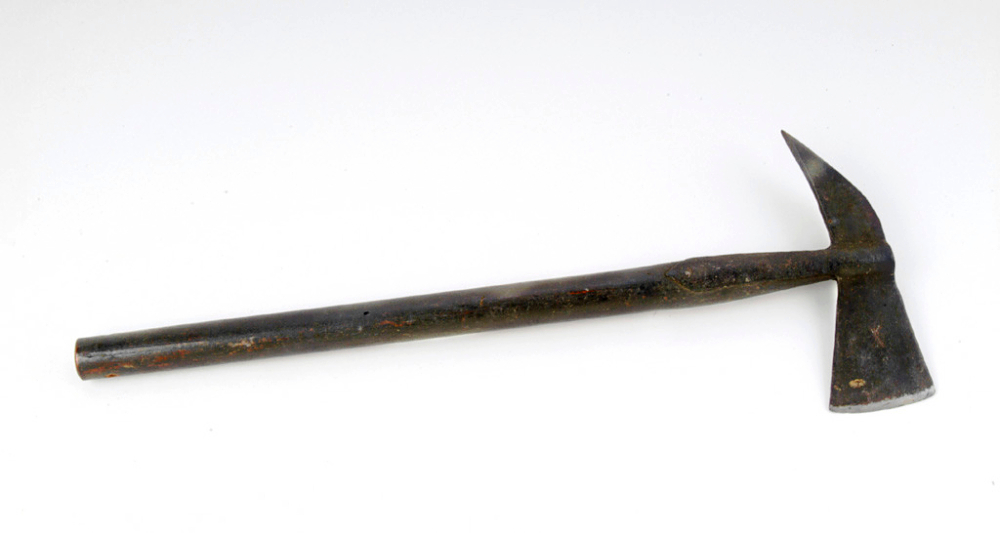
A British boarding axe held by the National Museum of American History

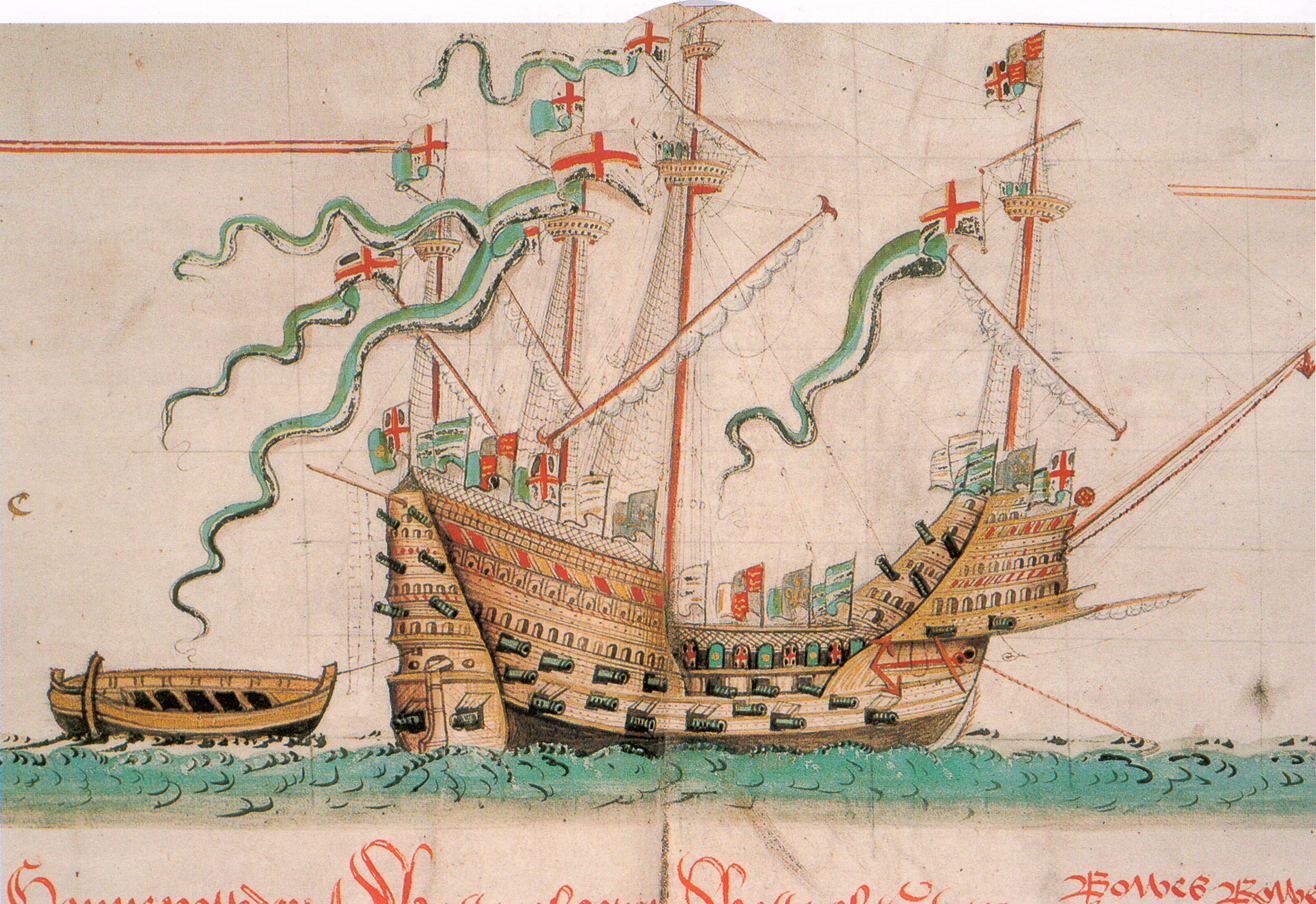
The crew of the Mary Rose were trapped aboard the ship by her boarding net as the vessel was sinking.

== Description and use ==
The boarding net was a rope net that could be raised from a ship's masts so that it encircled the vessel's deck. A ship's captain could order the net deployed during battle if it became apparent that enemy naval infantry might attempt to capture his vessel through a boarding action; it might also be raised at night if the vessel was at anchor in unknown or hostile waters. Once deployed, enemy forces would be unable to gain access to the deck without first cutting through the heavy rope netting, a process that would slow them considerably, during which time they would be exposed to attack by the ship's defenders using standoff weapons such as firearms or pikes.

To overcome the boarding net, boarding parties could be equipped with boarding axes – lightweight hand axes designed to cut through rope.

== Observations and accounts ==
According to the autobiography of George Pegler, while employed aboard the merchantman Blendinghall in the early 19th century he observed that the ship's boarding net was made of "ratlin rope with here and there a small chain running through its entire length, to prevent cutting by the enemy". When a French privateer engaged Blendinghall, the ship's boarding net kept the attackers from successfully gaining access to her deck.

Francis Liardet's 1849 book Professional Recollections on Points of Seamanship suggests that a boarding net could be made more resistant to cutting by first covering it with tar.

=== Royal Navy ===
In the Royal Navy, boarding nets first gained widespread use in the 1790s, though were typically limited to use on ships of frigate-size and smaller, as ships of the line were unlikely to be targets of boarding in the first place. However, individual examples of naval vessels from the British Isles using boarding nets extend back at least to the Mary Rose in the 16th century. In the case of Mary Rose, the crew became trapped on the deck by the boarding net when she began taking on water, leading to the loss of almost all hands during her sinking.

The SS Beaver, chartered by the Royal Navy to survey the coast of British Columbia, reportedly kept her boarding net deployed at all times "to prevent access by the natives otherwise than by the gangways".

=== United States Navy ===
The 1864 capture of the U.S. Navy gunboat USS Water Witch by the Confederate States Marine Corps was accomplished despite Water Witch's boarding net having been deployed, leading to a recommendation from the North Atlantic Blockading Squadron that ships be outfitted with wire boarding nets instead of rope ones.

== See also ==
- Naval boarding
