= USCGC Travis =

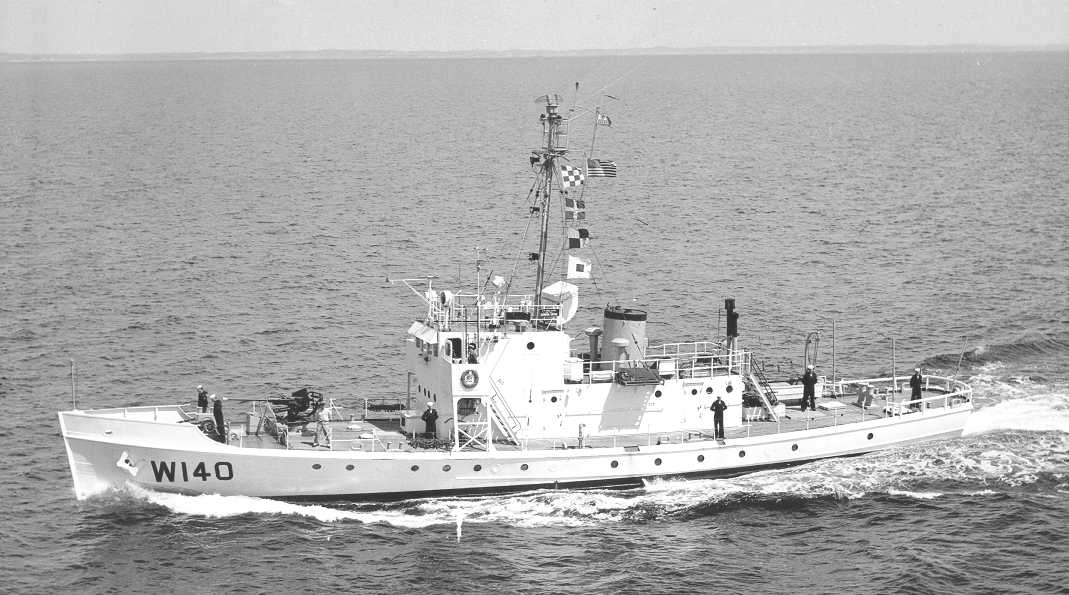
- Sister ship USCGC General Greene

History

United States
- Name: Travis
- Namesake: Captain Samuel Travis (Note: Of the Revenue Marine, he was the commanding officer of the cutter Surveyor during the War of 1812.)
- Owner: United States Coast Guard
- Builder: American Brown Boveri Electric Corp., Camden, New Jersey
- Laid down: 1 February 1927
- Launched: 18 April 1927
- Commissioned: 29 April 1927
- Decommissioned: 5 June 1962
- Fate: Sold, 15 November 1962

General characteristics
- Class & type: Active-class patrol boat
- Displacement: 232 long tons (236 t)
- Length: 125 ft (38 m)
- Beam: 23 ft 6 in (7.16 m)
- Draft: 7 ft 6 in (2.29 m)
- Propulsion: At launch: 2 × 6-cylinder, 300 hp (224 kW) Winton Model 114-6 diesel engines 1938: 2 x Cooper-Bessemer EN-9 600 bhp diesel engines 2 Propellers
- Speed: 1945; Maximum: 13 knots (24 km/h; 15 mph); Cruise: 8 kn (15 km/h; 9.2 mph)
- Range: 3,500 nmi (6,500 km; 4,000 mi); At max. speed: 2,500 nmi (4,600 km; 2,900 mi)
- Boats & landing craft carried: As built: 2 20' pulling boats; 1976: 1 14' utility boat
- Complement: 1938: 22; 1944: 38; 1960: 3 officers, 17 men
- Armament: 1927: 1 × 3"/27 caliber gun; 1941: 1 × 3"/23 caliber gun; 2 × depth charge tracks, 10 depth charges; 1945: 1 × 40 mm/60 (single); 2 × 20 mm/70 (single); 2 × depth charge tracks; 2 × Mousetrap ASW; 1960: 1 × 40 mm/60
- Notes: 1 600-watt 12" spotlight

USCGC Travis (WSC-153) was a US Coast Guard Active-class patrol boat cutter. It was built to combat the rum-running trade.

== History ==
It was built in 1927 in Camden, New Jersey, by the American Brown Boveri Corp. It was commissioned in mid- or late 1927, with Boatswain's Mate J. S. Turner in charge.

Travis operated out of Stapleton, N.Y., Morehead City, N.C., and Rockland, Maine, successively, through the 1930s. The latter port served as her home base from 1937 to the summer of 1941, when the Coast Guard was placed under naval control for the duration of World War II.

Apparently shifted to Argentia, Newfoundland, in either late 1941 or early 1942 to support the Atlantic Fleet in the Battle of the Atlantic, Travis—designated WPC—153—picked up a sound contact at 1100 on 8 February 1942 while patrolling off Placentia Bay. She dropped a depth charge which temporarily disabled her sound gear. Once the cutter regained the contact, she dropped another pair of charges. Although they noted an oil slick, no definite confirmation of a "kill" was made.

Travis apparently remained in these northern climes into the winter of 1942. On 20 December, she came across the disabled freighter Maltran which was in danger of running aground on a poorly charted rocky shore. The cutter attempted to tow off the ship, but the hawser parted. Meanwhile, Mohawk (WPG-78) happened by and, at the request of Travis, rendered assistance. The second cutter relieved the first in the towing operation and succeeded in taking Maltran in tow at 0315 on 21 December, while Travis operated as an antisubmarine screen. Eventually, the little group successfully navigated the dangerous uncharted waters and emerged to make passage to the swept channel at Argentia.

Travis was decommissioned and sold soon thereafter.
