= Task Force Iron Gate =

Special task force

- Task Force Iron Gate
- Active: 7 November 2026 – present
- Country: United States
- Branch: United States Central Command (CENTCOM)
- Type: Task force (headquarters element)
- Role: Disrupting the movement of weapons and sanctioned goods to and from Iran through land routes and the Caspian Sea
- Size: Approximately 20 military and civilian personnel
- Part of: United States Central Command
- Garrison/HQ: Tampa, Florida, United States

Commanders
- Notable commanders: Admiral Brad Cooper (CENTCOM commander; directed its establishment)

Task Force Iron Gate is a special task force established by the United States Central Command (CENTCOM) on 7 November 2026. Based in Tampa, Florida, it was created to support US government efforts to prevent Iran from using its land borders and the Caspian Sea to transport advanced weapons systems, sanctioned materials, dual-use technologies, and illicit revenue. The task force consists of approximately 20 civilian and military personnel and coordinates with other US government agencies.

The formation of the task force was first reported by Reuters in an exclusive report by journalist Phil Stewart, before CENTCOM's official announcement.

== Background ==
The establishment of Task Force Iron Gate was part of broader US efforts to restrict Iran's access to military equipment and sanctioned goods. According to CENTCOM, the task force was intended to complement existing maritime restrictions by focusing on overland transportation routes and shipping networks across the Caspian Sea.

Reuters reported that Iran had continued to import military-related equipment through a network involving maritime transportation from Russia, trucks from Central Asia, and cargo aircraft from China, despite existing US restrictions.

== Organization and mission ==
Admiral Brad Cooper, commander of CENTCOM, directed the establishment of the task force on 7 November 2026. Its headquarters is located in Tampa, Florida, and its personnel include approximately 20 military and civilian staff members.

The task force's responsibilities include coordinating with other US government agencies to prevent the movement of:

- Advanced weapons systems;
- Dual-use technologies;
- Materials subject to international sanctions;
- Financial resources and revenue streams described by the US government as illicit.

According to Cooper, cooperation between CENTCOM and other US government agencies was intended to further restrict Iran's ability to finance militant groups, rebuild weapons manufacturing facilities, and replenish its military capabilities.

== Analysis ==
Analysts believe that the small "Task Force Iron Gate" won't be able to close Iran's borders without regional cooperation. Andreas Krieg, a defense studies professor at King's College London, describes Task Force Iron Gate as a "desperate attempt" to extend Iran's blockade without sending forces to the region. Rami Khouri, a fellow at the American American University of Beirut, sees the mission as impossible because of Iran's position in Asia and its deep ties with its neighbors. Mahjoob Zweiri, a professor at Qatar University, views the mission as symbolic, as Iran's northern neighbors won't cooperate because they don't want to irritate Russia.

== See also ==
- Operation Project Freedom
- 2026 Iran war
- United States Central Command
- United States sanctions against Iran
- Caspian Sea
