= Alex Vatanka =

Analyst and think tank leader in the US

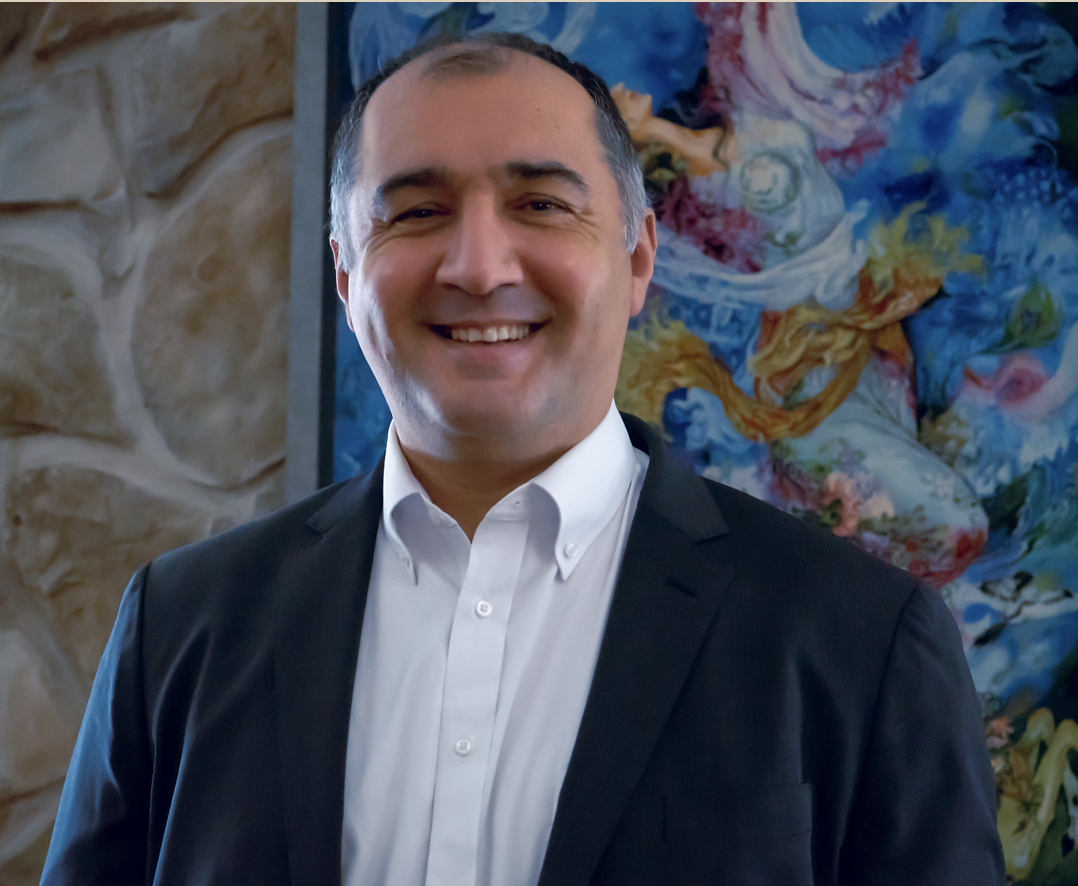
Alex Vatanka 2023

Alex Vatanka (Persian: آلکس وطنخواه) is a senior fellow and the founding director of the Iran program at the Middle East Institute in Washington, D.C. He specializes in Iranian domestic and regional policies. Born in Tehran and also raised in Denmark, he joined the Middle East Institute in 2007. He was formerly an analyst with Jane’s Information Group in London (UK) before moving to Washington D.C. He is also a senior fellow in Middle East Studies at the US Air Force Special Operations School at Hurlburt Field and teaches as an adjunct professor at Wright-Patterson AFB.

== Career ==
As a senior fellow at Middle East Institute, Vatanka's research covers Iranian foreign and domestic affairs, including political-military relations and intra-regime power competition. In the realm of Iranian foreign policy, his emphasis is on Iran-US relations and Iran’s relations with the Gulf States, and Israel but also Russia and China. Vatanka’s analysis on the Joint Comprehensive Plan of Action signed between the P5+1 and Iran in July at a panel event held by MEI. Prior to the Joint Comprehensive Plan of Action, he described what he believes are the likely outcomes of a deal with Iran in an op-ed with The National Interest. With Israel's security concerns regarding a nuclear Iran, Vatanka had been covering the development of the Iranian missile program, and Iran's capability in striking Israel and surrounding countries in the region.

Vatanka has not usually been targeted by the hawkish state-run media in Iran, but his writings on the Iranian Green opposition movement in 2009–2010 led to some personal attacks by hardliners in Tehran, including by Kayhan, the top state-run newspaper, which at one point accused him of being a collaborator with Western intelligence services.

=== Concentration(s) ===
With Iran's geopolitical strategies in the region in the recent decades, Vatanka was asked to testify before House Committee on Foreign Affairs – Subcommittee on Europe and Eurasia, regarding "Iranian influence in Southern Caucasus and the Surrounding Region." He described the unfolding of events in the Caucasus and made the following conclusion at the hearing:

"Iran's influence in the South Caucasus does not match its proximity or historical ties to the region. Tehran's insistence on building relations on an ideological and anti-Western platform is a failed policy. This is best symbolized by the poor state of relations between Iran and Azerbaijan. And it goes beyond bilateral ties. Thanks to its ideological intransigence, Tehran has removed itself as a contender in Caspian Basin energy bonanza. When Tehran has been able to make inroads in the region - specifically in Armenia and less so in Georgia - it has done so overwhelmingly because those states lack alternatives and not because of a convincing Iranian message."

He later wrote an article about Iran's recent approach to the Caucasus region since the coming of power of Iran's then newly elected president, Hassan Rouhani.

Vatanka has been a proponent of dialogue between the US and states in the Caucasus and Central Asia, arguing that Washington is better placed to shape domestic and foreign policies of those countries by remaining actively engaged with states such as Azerbaijan, Georgia and Kazakhstan.

== Publications and books ==
Vatanka's most recent book, The Battle of the Ayatollahs in Iran: The United States, Foreign Policy and Political Rivalry since 1979 was published by I.B. Tauris in 2021. The book looks at key turning points in Iranian foreign policy since 1979 and demonstrates how often petty factional competition for power in Tehran has undermined Iranian national interests when it comes to international relations. The two main antagonists of the book are Iran’s Supreme Leader Ali Khamenei, and the man who put him in that position, Akbar Hashemi Rafsanjani.

In 2015, he published Iran and Pakistan: Security, Diplomacy and American Influence, covering the history of relations between Iran and Pakistan from 1947 to present day The book was praised by academicians and scholars alike, including reviews from Bruce Riedel of the Brookings Institution and R. K. Ramazani, Professor Emeritus of Foreign Affairs at University of Virginia.

Vatanka's other publications include:

- Iran’s Regime Plays with Fire in Baluchistan
- America and Iran’s Tough Tango with the Gulf States
- What the Hijab Protests Mean for Iran’s Clerical Class
- Whose Iran is it anyway?
- Erdoğan in Tehran, but Turkey and Iran have plenty of mistrust to overcome
- Whither the IRGC of the 2020s?
- Articles et al
- The Islamic Republic's Cross-Sectarian Outreach
- Ali Khamene'í: Iran's Most Powerful Man,
- The Guardian of Pakistan's Shia,
- The Making of an Insurgency in Iran's Balochistan Province
- Iran's Yemen Play
- Iran: Peacemaker in the Caucasus?
- The Islamic Republic's Cross-Sectarian Outreach
