= USS Spruance (DDG-111) =

United States Navy guided missile destroyer

- USS Spruance in August 2022

History

United States
- Name: Spruance
- Namesake: Raymond A. Spruance
- Awarded: 13 September 2002
- Builder: Bath Iron Works
- Laid down: 14 May 2009
- Launched: 6 June 2010
- Christened: 5 June 2010
- Commissioned: 1 October 2011
- Home port: San Diego
- Identification: MMSI number: 338977000; Callsign: NLTA; Hull number: DDG-111
- Honors and awards: See Awards
- Status: in active service
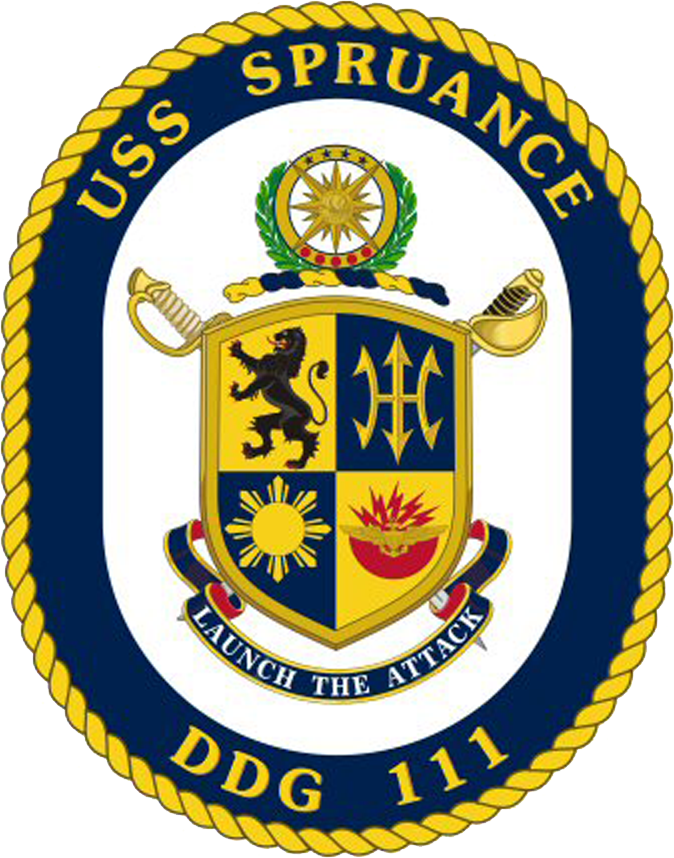
- Badge

General characteristics
- Class & type: Arleigh Burke-class destroyer
- Displacement: 9,200 tons
- Length: 510 ft (160 m)
- Beam: 66 ft (20 m)
- Draft: 33 ft (10 m)
- Propulsion: 4 × General Electric LM2500-30 gas turbines, 2 shafts, 100,000 shp (75 MW)
- Speed: over 30 knots (56 km/h; 35 mph)
- Range: 4,400 nautical miles (8,100 km; 5,100 mi) at 20 knots (37 km/h; 23 mph)
- Complement: 260 officers and enlisted
- Electronic warfare & decoys: AN/SLQ-32(V)2 Electronic Warfare System
- Armament: Guns: 1 × 5-inch (127 mm)/62 mk 45 mod 4 (lightweight gun); 1 × 20 mm (0.8 in) Phalanx CIWS; 2 × 25 mm (0.98 in) Mk 38 machine gun system; 4 × 0.50 inches (12.7 mm) caliber guns; Lasers: Optical Dazzling Interdictor, Navy (ODIN); Missiles: 1 × 32-cell, 1 × 64-cell (96 total cells) Mk 41 vertical launching system (VLS): RIM-66M surface-to-air missile; RIM-156 surface-to-air missile; RIM-174A standard ERAM; RIM-161 anti-ballistic missile; RIM-162 ESSM (quad-packed); BGM-109 Tomahawk cruise missile; RUM-139 vertical launch ASROC; Torpedoes: 2 × Mark 32 triple torpedo tubes: Mark 46 lightweight torpedo; Mark 50 lightweight torpedo; Mark 54 lightweight torpedo
- Aircraft carried: 2 × MH-60R Seahawk helicopters

USS Spruance (DDG-111) is an Arleigh Burke-class (Flight IIA) Aegis guided-missile destroyer in the United States Navy. Spruance is the second ship to be named after Admiral Raymond A. Spruance (1886–1969), who commanded American naval forces at the Battles of Midway and Philippine Sea.

== Ship history ==
=== Construction ===
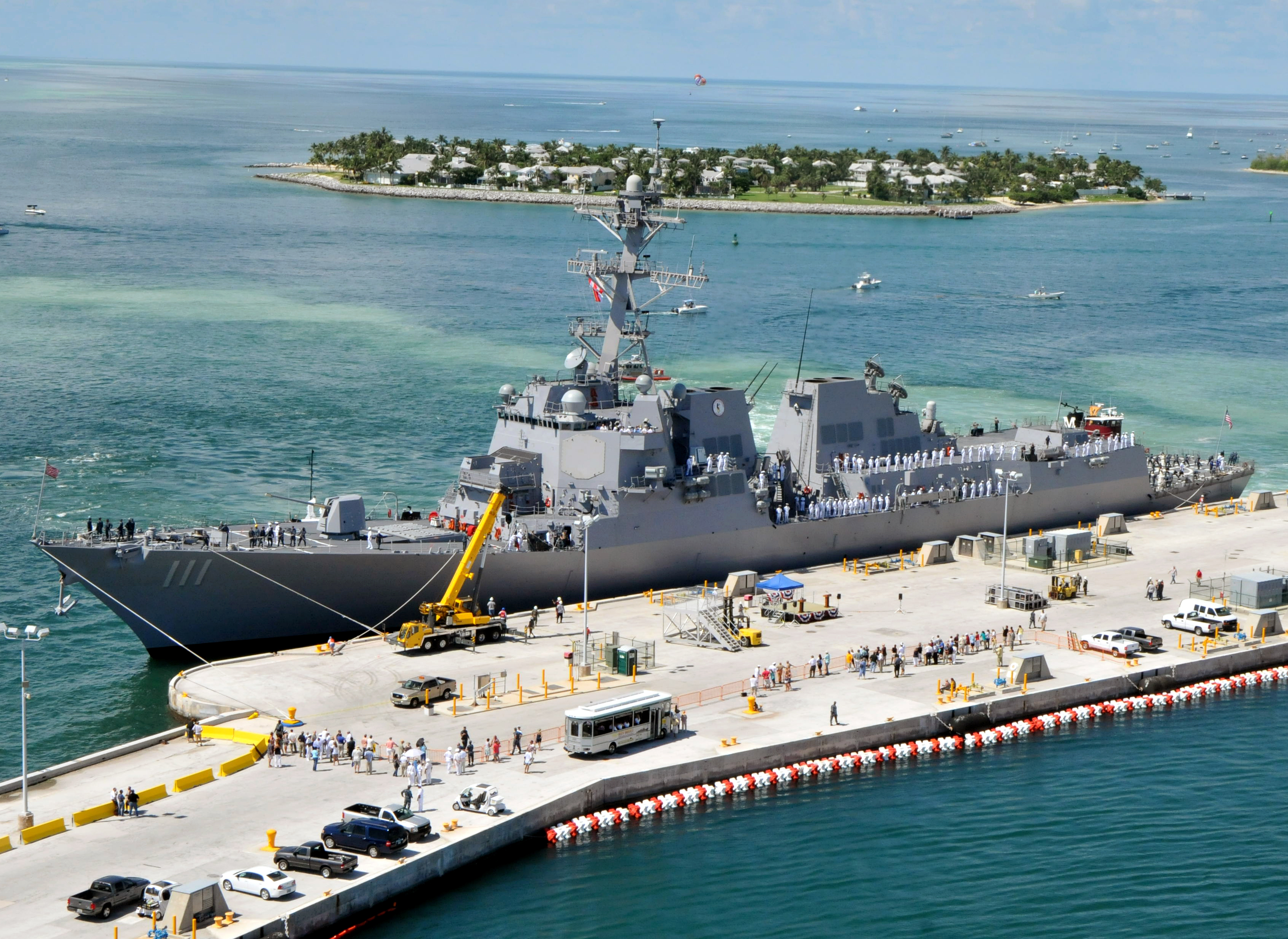
USS Spruance in September 2011.

Spruance was built in Bath, Maine, at Bath Iron Works, at a cost of $1 billion. Her keel was laid down on 14 May 2009. Spruance was the first of the U.S. Navy's destroyers to be fitted with the Gigabit Ethernet Data Multiplex System (GEDMS), manufactured by the Boeing Company. GEDMS provides an Internet Protocol-based backbone for video and data services on the ship. The bridge features touch-screen controls and color readouts instead of gauges.

At her christening on 5 June 2010, the principal address was delivered by Honorable John Baldacci of Maine, and the vessel was christened by Ellen Spruance Holscher as the ship's sponsor. Commander Tate Westbrook was the ship's first commanding officer.

=== Operational history ===
The completed ship left Bath on 1 September 2011 for her commissioning in Key West, Florida, on 1 October 2011.

She sailed from San Diego on her maiden deployment on 16 October 2013, heading for Asia under the command of Commander George Kessler, who was succeeded by Commander Daniel Cobian.

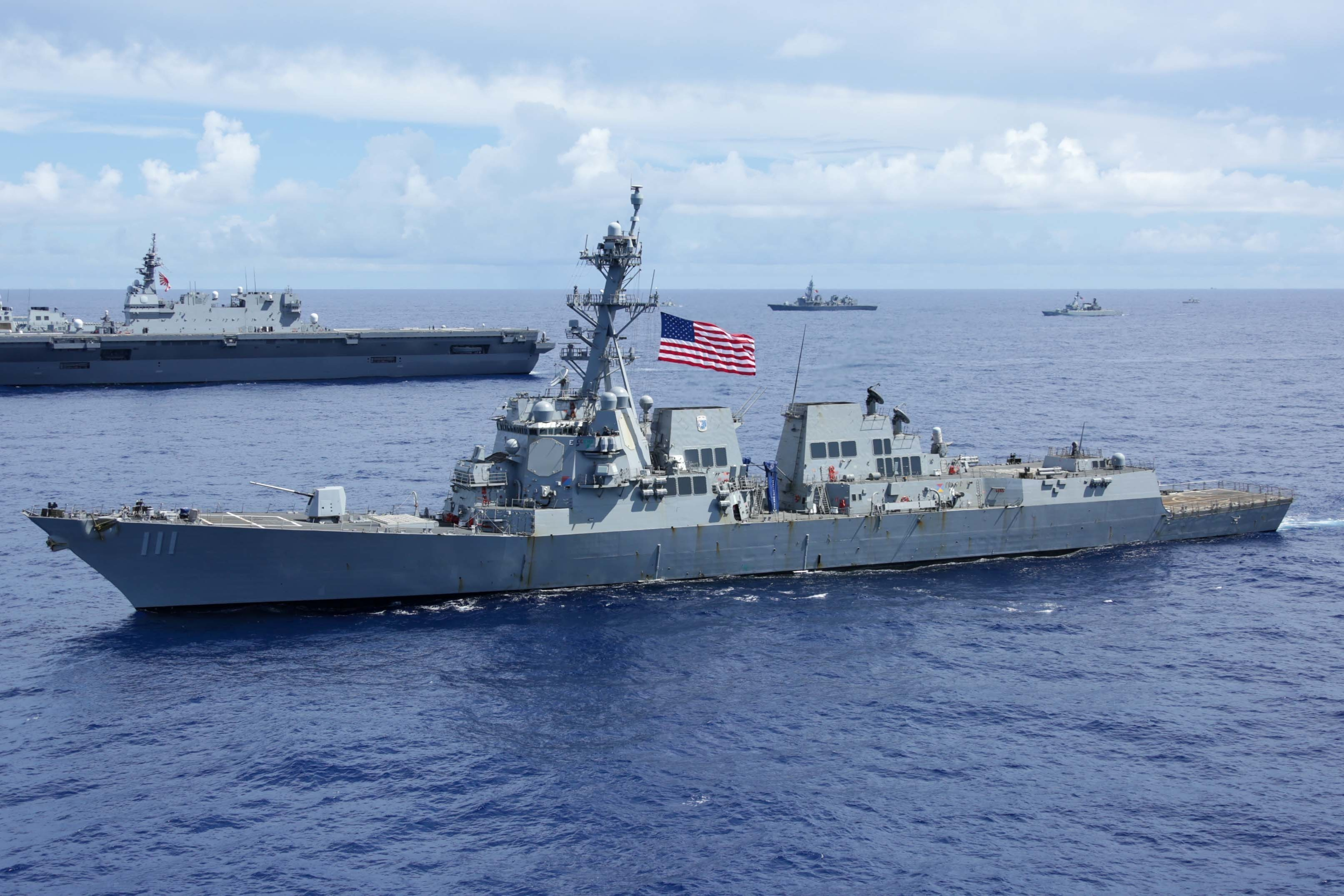
Spruance sails with the carrier Izumo, 28 July 2022.

In January 2024, the U.S. Navy reinstalled ODIN Laser on Spruance. ODIN, a solid-state laser system, is designed primarily to counter and neutralize the sensors on UAS, effectively blinding them without destroying the aircraft. Technical aspects of the ODIN system include its ability to emit a high-intensity laser beam, targeting the optical sensors of enemy drones.

On the morning of 27 September 2024, while transiting the Red Sea with the Arleigh Burke-class destroyer USS Stockdale and Freedom-class littoral combat ship USS Indianapolis, she was attacked by roughly two dozen missiles and drones launched by Iranian-backed Houthi rebels in Yemen. All missiles and drones were intercepted by the flotilla or missed their target outright.

On 11 November 2024, following U.S. attacks on Houthi bases in Yemen, the Houthis again attacked the Spruance and Stockdale, launching eight drones, five ballistic missiles, and three cruise missiles at the American destroyers. All of the projectiles were shot down by the destroyers with no damage or casualties to the vessels.

On 22 March 2025, Spruance helped the U>S> Coast Guard and agents with U.S. Customs and Border Protection apprehend 13 people in a vessel off the Mexican coast.

Spruance during the 2026 Iran war

Spruance launched Tomahawk missiles at Iranian targets during the 2026 Iran war on 28th February 2026.

On 19 April 2026, Spruance attacked the Iran-flagged cargo ship Touska after she attempted to breach the U.S. naval blockade of Iran en route to Bandar Abbas. Spruance fired several rounds from her 5-inch/54-caliber Mark 45 gun into the Touska's engine room, disabling the vessel, which was then seized by the 31st Marine Expeditionary Unit in the Gulf of Oman. Iran described the seizure as a U.S.-Iran truce violation. Iran retaliated against the seizure by launching attack drones at U.S. ships, although no damage was reported. According to Reuters, the seized ship was probably carrying equipment that the U.S. considered "dual-use", meaning equipment that could be used by the Iranian army.

Spruance holds the record for longest deployment of a U.S. Navy destroyer since World War II, following her return from the Iran conflict on 13 November 2026.

== Awards ==
- Combat Action Ribbon - (Sep–Nov 2024)
- U.S. Coast Guard Meritorious Team Commendation Ribbon with Operational Distinguishing Device (2017)
- Abraham Lincoln Carrier Strike Group's Deployment Tomahawk Strike Warfare Award for Thor's Hammer 2022
