= USRC Surveyor =

US ship in War of 1812

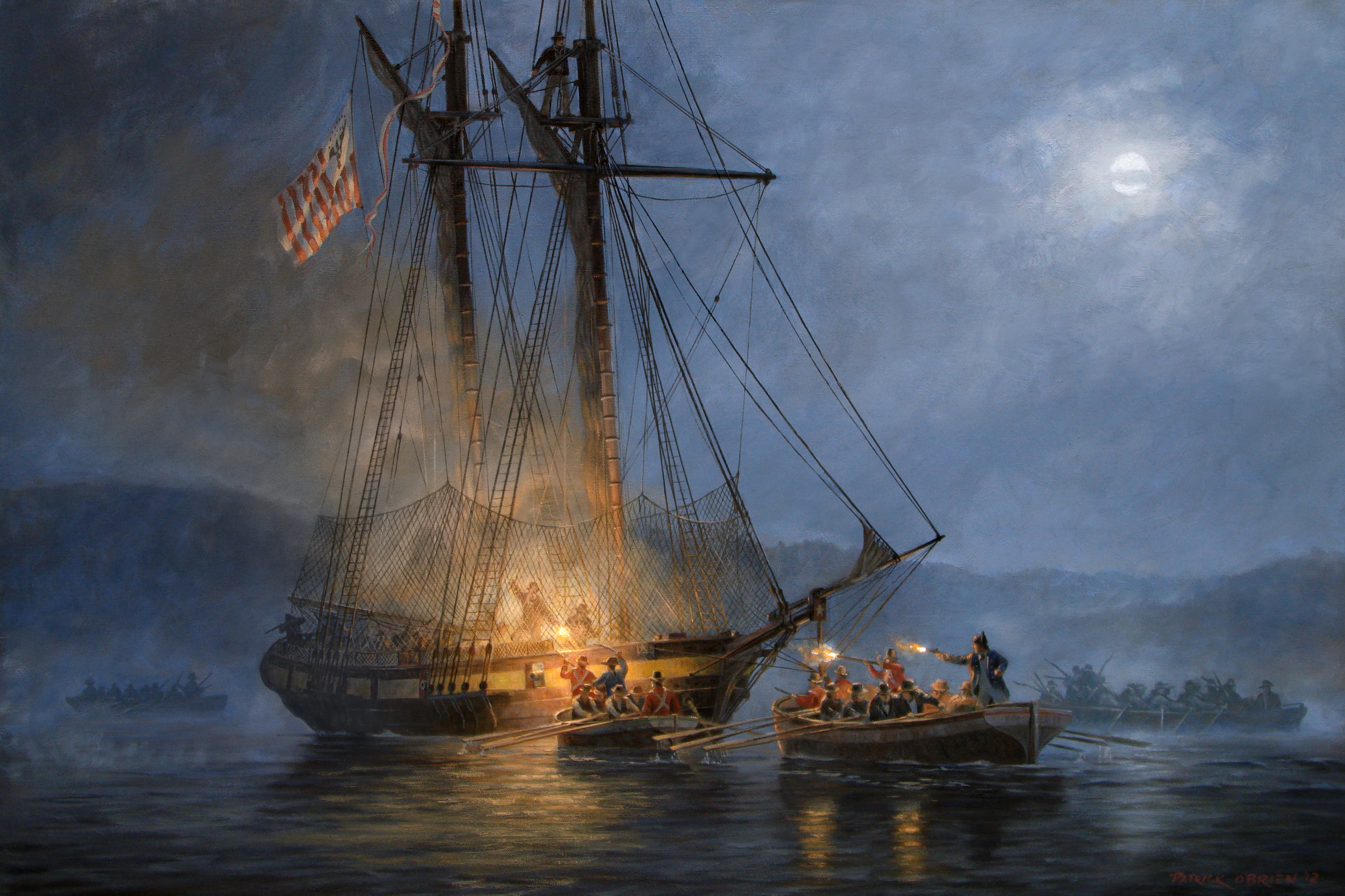
- Surveyor being captured on June 12, 1813

History

United Kingdom
- Name: Unknown
- Operator: Royal Navy
- Acquired: 1813
- Out of service: By or before 1814
- Fate: Unknown

History

United States
- Name: USRC Surveyor
- Operator: United States Revenue Marine
- Laid down: 1807
- Commissioned: 1807
- Home port: Baltimore, Maryland, United States
- Captured: 1813, by United Kingdom

General characteristics
- Type: Schooner
- Length: 68 ft (21 m)
- Beam: 19 ft (5.8 m)
- Complement: 25 personnel
- Armament: 6 × 12-pounder carronades; or 6 × 6-pounder guns

USRC Surveyor was a 6-gun cutter of the United States Revenue-Marine captured by British forces during the War of 1812. Despite the vessel's loss, the "gallant and desperate" defense of her crew against a superior British force is commemorated by the United States Coast Guard. Along with the British frigate which bested her in battle, HMS Narcissus, Surveyor is among six legendary ships memorialized in the lyrics of the Coast Guard march "Semper Paratus".

== Construction ==
USRC Surveyor was laid down in 1807 and commissioned the same year. The 75 tonnes (74 long tons; 83 short tons) cutter was 7-foot (2.1 m) in draft and 68-foot (21 m) in length with a 19 foot (5.8 m) beam. Home ported in Baltimore, Maryland, different sources report her as armed either with six 12-pound carronades, or six six-pound cannon. Surveyor carried a normal complement of 25.

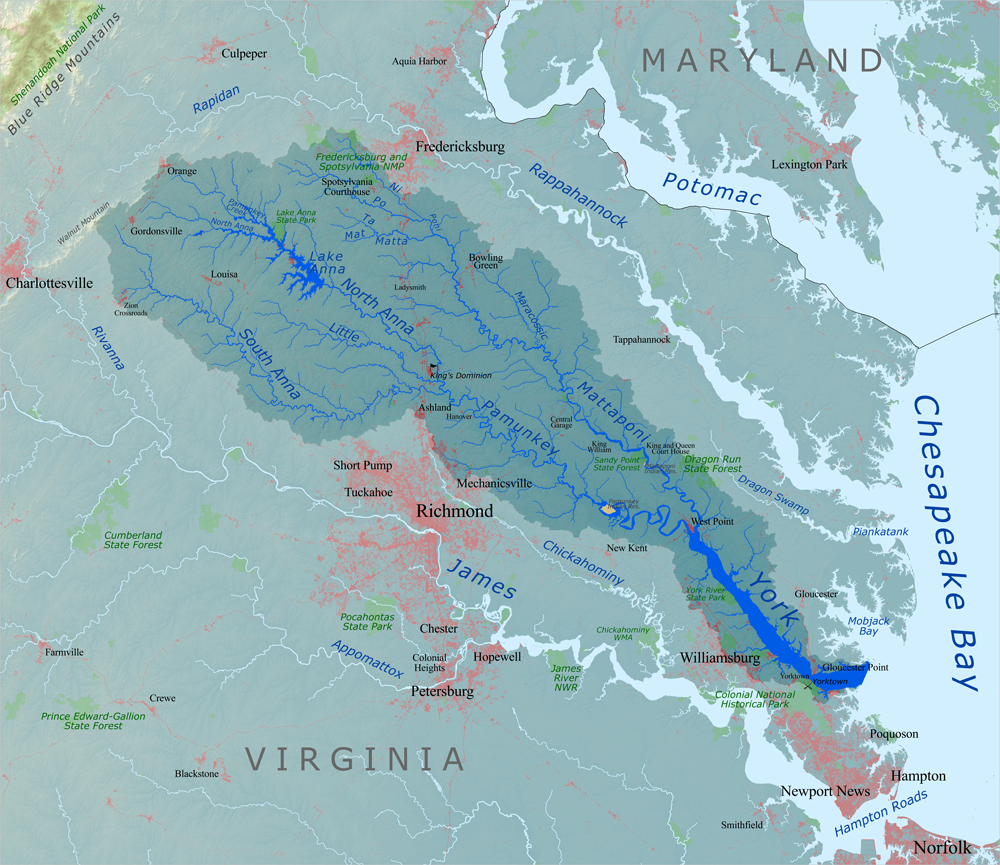
The capture of Surveyor occurred at the southern end of Chesapeake Bay (pictured) near Gloucester Point.

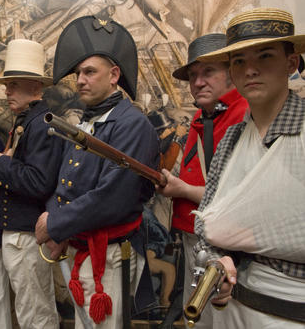
US Coast Guard Auxiliary members dressed in Revenue Marine attire of the War of 1812

== Service history ==
=== Pre-War ===
In 1809, according to U.S. Coast Guard records, Surveyor took the schooners Martha and Susan. The following year, in 1810, she captured a French privateer.

=== War of 1812 ===
==== Early war ====
Following the outbreak of the War of 1812, the United States had 30 warships at its disposal, 16 of which were operated by the US Navy and the rest by the United States Revenue Marine, the maritime force of the United States Department of the Treasury. The Revenue Marine's ships suffered from poor provisioning, as the Department of the Treasury took the position that the war was not its responsibility to fight, except in circumstances where the collection of taxes was threatened, and that the costs of prosecuting the conflict should be borne by the Department of War and Department of the Navy.

In 1811, Surveyor's first mate, Samuel Travis, was promoted to ship's master. Travis had served as first mate since the ship's commissioning. (Note: A Virginian, during the American Revolution, the kitchen chimney on Travis' family home near Jamestown had been destroyed during a Royal Navy shelling.) Under his command, on July 1, 1812, Surveyor captured a British merchantman off the coast of Jamaica. In May 1813, Britain imposed a naval blockade of the United States; within the year, according to historian Melvin Jackson, the entire U.S. coast "lay all but deserted" to maritime traffic and the country was essentially cut-off from the rest of the world.

==== "The gallant and desperate" defense of Surveyor ====
Surveyor was attacked and captured by a boarding party from HMS Narcissus on the evening of June 12, 1813. On that day, Surveyor, with a crew of 18 men, was anchored in Chesapeake Bay near Gloucester Point. Throughout the war, the Royal Navy carried out shore raids and coastal blockades in the Chesapeake Bay in part to divert US forces from Canada. Prior to nightfall, Travis ordered the ship's boarding net raised and muskets and cutlasses placed in accessible locations on the deck. A sentry boat manned by one officer and three sailors was also launched. Travis' cautious preparations were vindicated when, a few hours later, Surveyor was attacked by a boarding party of between 50 and 65 men from Narcissus. Narcissus had entered the bay under cover of darkness and her boarding party moved against Surveyor in two small boats, using muffled oars to conceal their approach.

The British boats were spotted 150 yards from Surveyor by the American ship's picket, which fired an alarm shot that alerted the rest of the crew and ruined the attacker's element of surprise. As the boarders approached the vessel, they navigated away from the cutter's deck guns to neutralize their utility to the defenders. Travis ordered the crew of Surveyor to arm themselves with two muskets each and to man the rails. When the British boats were 50 yards away, he ordered his men to open fire. Despite this, the boarders gained access to the ship's deck and engaged in hand-to-hand combat with Surveyor's crew. During the engagement, Captain Thomas Ford of the Royal Marines was mortally wounded by Travis in a cutlass duel. However, with his men outnumbered Travis soon surrendered. In tribute to the ferocity of Surveyor's resistance, Travis' sword was returned to him by the boarding party's commander, Lieutenant John Crerie, with a commendation:

Your gallant and desperate attempt to defend your vessel against more than double your number excited such admiration on the part of your opponents as I have seldom witnessed, and induced me to return you the sword you had so ably used... I am at a loss which to admire most, the previous arrangement on board the Surveyor or the determined manner in which her deck was disputed inch-by-inch.

The brief engagement resulted in the British suffering three killed and seven wounded. The entire crew of Surveyor, five of whom were wounded, became prisoners of war. Travis was paroled at Washington, North Carolina on August 7, 1813, while his crew was transferred to a British prisoner-of-war camp at Halifax, Nova Scotia.

==== Later war ====
Following her capture, Surveyor was re-flagged for Royal Navy use and, in June of 1813, participated in the British attack on Hampton, Virginia. She was no longer in service by 1814 and her ultimate fate is unknown.

== Legacy ==
In 1927, the United States Coast Guard christened one of its Active-class patrol boats as USCGC Travis, in honor of Samuel Travis.

In 2012, in conjunction with bicentennial anniversary events commemorating the War of 1812, the United States Coast Guard commissioned the oil on canvas painting The Gallant Defense of Cutter Surveyor from Patrick O'Brien. It depicts Surveyor with her boarding net raised and her crew armed at the rails as four Royal Navy small boats converge on the ship. On June 15, 2014, the defense and capture of the Surveyor was reenacted at the Watermen's Museum in Yorktown, Virginia.

Both Surveyor and Narcissus are among the six legendary ships from the Coast Guard's history mentioned in the second verse of its march "Semper Paratus", the others being USRC Eagle, USRC Hudson, USCGC Tampa, and HMS Dispatch. (Note: "Surveyor and Narcissus, The Eagle and Dispatch, The Hudson and the Tampa, the names are hard to match.")

== See also ==
- Capture of USS Chesapeake, which took place on the same day
- Defense of the Cutter Eagle – another battle between HMS Narcissus and a U.S. Revenue Marine ship
- NOAAS Surveyor – another uniformed services of the United States ship named Surveyor
- USC&GS Surveyor – another uniformed services of the United States ship named Surveyor
