= Touska =

Iranian container ship

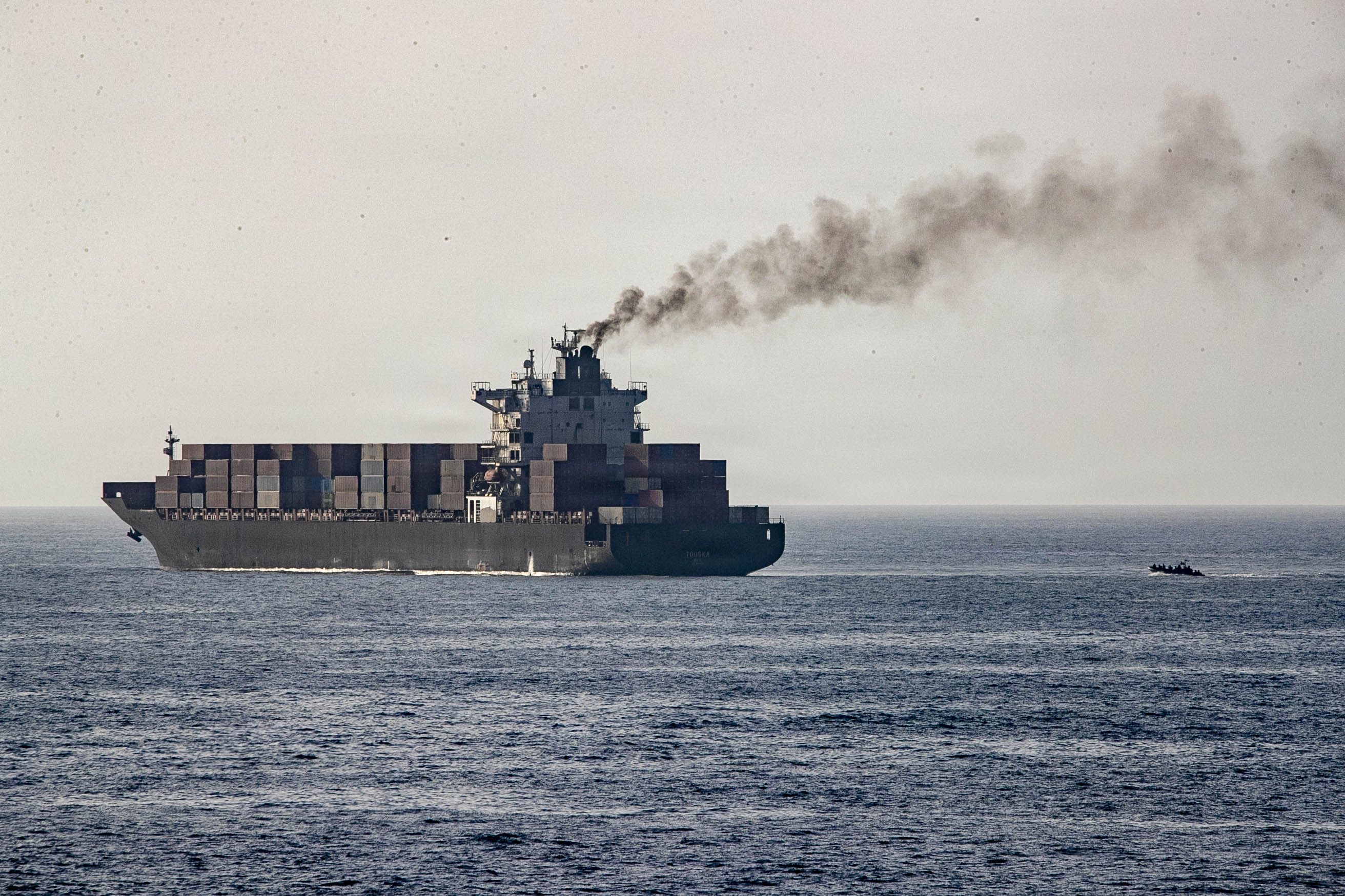
- MV Touska before its seizure

History

Iran
- Name: Touska
- Owner: Rahbaran Omid Darya Ship Management
- Port of registry: Qeshm
- Builder: HD Hyundai Heavy Industries, Ulsan
- Laid down: 2008
- Launched: 2008
- Completed: 2008
- In service: 2008
- Home port: Qeshm
- Identification: IMO number: 9328900
- Captured: 2026
- Fate: Seized by the United States Marine Corps in the Strait of Hormuz
- Status: Active

General characteristics
- Type: Panamax container ship
- Tonnage: 66,432 t (65,383 long tons; 73,229 short tons)
- Length: 295 m (967 ft 10 in)
- Beam: 32 m (105 ft 0 in)
- Draft: 12 m (39 ft 4 in)
- Installed power: MAN B&W 9K90MC-C diesel at 41,000–50,000 kW (55,000–67,000 hp)
- Speed: 16 to 20 kn (30 to 37 km/h; 18 to 23 mph)

MV Touska (Persian: توسکا, a tree) is a Panamax-sized container ship built in 2008 and sailed under the flag of Iran.

In April 2026, as part of the naval blockade of Iran during the 2026 Iran war, the vessel was fired-on, disabled, and seized by the United States. It was also involved in an accident in November 2017 when it ran aground.

== Grounding ==
The Touska ran aground on 5 November 2017, at 9.15 p.m. off Magazine Island near Hong Kong while en route from Kaohsiung to Shenzhen. The ship was traveling at 7.5 knots (13.9 km/h; 8.6 mph) at the time of grounding but the crew of 28 was not injured.

== 2026 Iran war ==
On 19 April 2026, as part of the naval blockade of Iran during the 2026 Iran war, the Touska was fired upon by the destroyer USS Spruance and seized by US Marines from the 31st Marine Expeditionary Unit after the vessel refused to stop in the north Arabian Sea en route to Bandar Abbas, Iran. While bound for Iran, it had previously stopped at a Chinese port known for the export of chemicals that could be used for rocket propellants. Spruance disabled Touska's propulsion by firing several rounds from the destroyer's 5-inch/54-caliber Mark 45 gun into Touska's engine room. The United States Central Command claimed that the vessel was subject to multiple warnings; including one advising the crew to evacuate the engine room, that the Touska's crew had "failed to comply with repeated warnings over a six-hour period", and released a video documenting at least part of the alleged warnings.

In response, the Iranian government stated:

"'We warn that the Armed Forces of the Islamic Republic of Iran will soon respond and retaliate against this armed piracy by the U.S. military[...]"

Iran further claimed that the United States had violated the in-place ceasefire.

The ship was under United States Treasury sanctions because of previous illegal activity according to President Donald Trump.

In May 2026, 22 crew members were transferred from the vessel into Pakistani custody as part of confidence-building measures between the United States and Iran. According to Pakistan's Ministry of Foreign Affairs and international reports, the transfer involved coordination between both countries, with Pakistan acting as a facilitator. The crew were later repatriated to Iran via Pakistan.

USS Spruance fires on Touska

United States Marines leave the amphibious assault ship USS Tripoli and board Touska on 19 April 2026.
