= Persian Gulf Strait Authority =

Iranian government agency

- نهاد مدیریت آبراه خلیج فارس
- Logo of the Persian Gulf Strait Authority (PGSA)
- Abbreviation: PGSA
- Formation: 5 May 2026; 5 months ago
- Type: Government agency
- Purpose: Managing the Strait of Hormuz
- Headquarters: Tehran, Iran
- Parent organization: Government of Iran

The Persian Gulf Strait Authority (PGSA) (Note: Persian: نهاد مدیریت آبراه خلیج فارس, romanized: Nahâd-e Modiriyat-e Âbrâh-e Xalīj-e Fârs) is an Iranian government agency mandated to authorize and regulate maritime transit through the strait of Hormuz. It was founded on 5 May 2026 during the ongoing Strait of Hormuz crisis.

== Background ==
In March 2026, Iran declared that vessels would be required to pay for safe passage through the Strait of Hormuz, in order to avoid sea mines that had previously been planted or to avoid confrontations with Iranian military vessels. Iran has claimed that the March announcement was swiftly exploited by scam operators offering fraudulent transit documents in exchange for cryptocurrency payments. To address this issue and bring clarity to maritime traffic procedures, Iran established the Persian Gulf Strait Authority (PGSA) with an official email contact. Under this system, shipowners receive verifiable guidance and can apply for transit permits directly through the PGSA's formal process, creating a centralized and transparent mechanism for coordinating transit through the strait with the Islamic Revolutionary Guard Corps. By charging tolls for transiting the international waterway, the Islamic Revolutionary Guard Corps guarantees ships will not be openly attacked.

Iran has reported that, as of 4 June 2026, over 300 shipping companies had applied for permits, mainly for Asian destinations, especially China and India, with the main incoming destination being the United Arab Emirates.

== Reception and legal status ==
The United Nations Convention on the Law of the Sea permits coastal states to regulate territorial waters for safety and environmental reasons through transparent, non-discriminatory fees, and they may also impose charges for specific services rendered to passing vessels, provided such charges are applied transparently and without discrimination. This principle is currently at the heart of the 2026 Strait of Hormuz crisis. Iran is attempting to implement a management regime in the Strait of Hormuz, which the United States opposes, responding by targeting Iranian radar installations to disrupt their policing capabilities.

On 1 May 2026, the United States Office of Foreign Assets Control (OFAC) issued an advisory warning that payments to Iran for passage through the strait exposed both US and non-US persons to sanctions risk. The advisory specified that the risk applied regardless of payment method, including cash, digital assets, in-kind transfers, and charitable donations to Iranian-linked entities such as the Iranian Red Crescent Society. Non-US firms facilitating such payments were warned of potential secondary sanctions, including restrictions on access to the US financial system.

Industry analysts noted that compliance with the PGSA permit process, where it involved transit payments, could itself trigger sanctions exposure for shipping companies. Richard Meade of Lloyd's Intelligence told CNN that the new system appeared designed to "formalize" Iranian authority over transits through the strait.

China has legislated and issued listings for a counter-sanctions regime that may impact the U.S. sanctions.

Oman has been resisting US pressure to break links with Iran, stating it has only been negotiating with Iran over the future management system for the strait of Hormuz compliant with international law.

== Counter-route ==
Operation Project Freedom, publicly launched by the U.S. on 4 May 2026 under President Donald Trump and Secretary of Defense Pete Hegseth, aimed to escort merchant vessels and restore freedom of navigation amid Iranian attacks and restrictions that had largely halted traffic. The overt phase was paused after about 48 hours for diplomatic reasons, but a secret/"underground" continuation reportedly facilitated the transit of around 200 commercial ships and over 100–125 million barrels of oil despite risks.

== See also ==
- Panama Canal Authority
- Suez Canal Authority
- Islamic Republic of Iran Navy
- Islamic Revolutionary Guard Corps Navy
- Tolling system in the Kingdom of Hormuz
