= 2026 Strait of Hormuz crisis =

Geopolitical and economic crisis

- Part of the 2026 Iran war
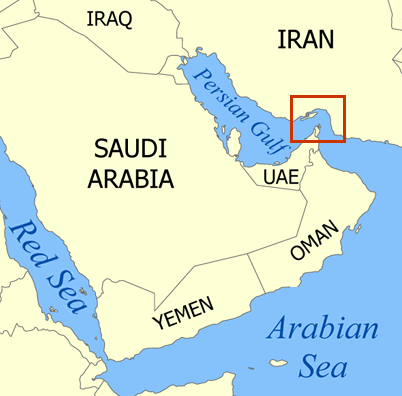
- The Strait of Hormuz highlighted by a red box, at the entrance to the Persian Gulf
- Date: 28 February 2026 – present (8 months, 3 weeks and 4 days)
- Location: Strait of Hormuz, Persian Gulf, and Gulf of Oman
- Cause: 2026 US–Israeli attacks on Iran
- Participants: Iran (IRGC Navy's 1st Naval Region), United States, Israel, and shipping companies
- Outcome: Global fuel crisis; US-led aerial campaign on Iranian targets along the strait; US naval blockade of Iran; US naval escort operation; Assertion of Iranian sovereignty over the Strait of Hormuz; Formation of Persian Gulf Strait Authority; Islamabad Memorandum
- Deaths: 24 seafarers 1 port worker
- Injuries: 35+
- Missing: 1

Shipping traffic through the Strait of Hormuz, a major maritime choke point for world energy trade, has been largely blocked by Iran since 28 February 2026, when the United States and Israel launched an air war against Iran. In retaliation, the Iranian Revolutionary Guard Corps (IRGC) issued warnings forbidding passage through the strait, boarded and attacked merchant ships, and laid sea mines in the strait. From 13 April to 29 May 2026, the US simultaneously blockaded Iranian ports. Until the war's start, about 25% of the world's seaborne oil trade and 20% of the world's liquefied natural gas (LNG) passed through the strait.

Soon after the start of the conflict, the number of tankers trafficking the strait dropped near zero. On 27 March, the IRGC announced that the strait was closed to any vessel going "to and from" the ports of the US, Israel, and their allies. The International Maritime Organization reported on 21 April that about 20,000 mariners and 2,000 ships were stranded in the Persian Gulf due to the closure. Amid fears of prolonged supply shortages, oil prices rose faster than during any other conflict in recent history; Brent crude oil prices surpassed US$100 per barrel on 8 March for the first time in four years, rising to US$126 per barrel at their peak. The largest-ever monthly increase in oil prices occurred in March 2026. The closure of the strait became the largest disruption to world energy supply since the 1970s energy crisis as well as the largest in the history of the world oil market. Other commodity markets to suffer supply disruption and price increases due to the crisis include aluminum, fertilizer, and helium.

In late March and early April, US president Donald Trump repeatedly threatened to destroy Iran's infrastructure if it did not reopen the strait. On 8 April a temporary ceasefire between Iran and the US was agreed and was to involve the reopening of the strait. However, following the failure of the Islamabad Talks, the US Navy itself began to blockade Iranian ports from 13 April. The situation was described by The Guardian as a "dual blockade", with the US Navy blockading Iran and Iran blockading the Gulf. On 17 April, Iran announced that due to an Israel–Lebanon ceasefire agreement, it would allow commercial shipping, but the US continued its blockade of Iran, and Iran reimposed restrictions. On 4 May, Trump launched Operation Project Freedom, a US Navy mission to escort merchant ships out of the Gulf. The Iranian military warned that this would be a ceasefire violation, and on 6 May, Trump paused Project Freedom because of "great progress" toward a possible agreement.

On 17 June, Trump and Iranian president Masoud Pezeshkian signed a memorandum of understanding to end the war and the blockades of the strait. On 19 June, Trump announced a renewed ceasefire between Israel and Hezbollah, facilitated by the US, Qatar, and Iran. However, Israel continued strikes in southern Lebanon, and the following day, Iran said that it closed the strait again, citing the Israeli actions as a violation of the agreement, a claim denied by the US military. On 27 June, the Joint Maritime Information Center (JMIC) overseen by the US Navy announced a widened route through the Strait of Hormuz near Oman, allowing increased naval traffic in both directions and indicating a challenge to Iran's control over the waterway. On 8 July, the interim truce agreement between the US and Iran broke down after Iran struck multiple commercial ships in the Strait of Hormuz. On 25 August, US officials confirmed Trump's claim that the US Navy cleared mines from the Strait of Hormuz Traffic Separation Scheme, adding that over recent months, underwater drones identified over 100 suspected mines and private contractors dealt with them. Trump stated that the US will destroy Iranian vessels laying additional mines in the Strait of Hormuz.

As of 21 October, the Middle Eastern oil exports, including shipments through the Strait of Hormuz and alternative routes, had averaged more than 24 million barrels per day in the week ending 18 October, exceeding the pre-war level of 23.3 million, according to Kpler. However, preliminary estimates put flows through Hormuz, including offshore transfers in the Gulf of Oman, at approximately 14 million barrels per day, or 82% of pre-war levels. Despite the recovery in exports, shipping costs remained high.

== Background ==
=== Global oil trade ===
Diagram showing 2024 daily average of LNG transported through the strait

The strait is 34 kilometres (21 mi) wide at its narrowest point, forming a seaway passage between Iran and Oman. Its two unidirectional sea lanes facilitate the transit of around 20 million barrels of oil per day, representing roughly 20% of global seaborne oil trade, primarily from Saudi Arabia, the United Arab Emirates, Iraq, and Qatar. In 2024, an estimated 84% of crude oil and condensate shipments through the strait were destined for Asian markets, with China receiving a third of its oil via the strait, and had about a billion barrels in oil reserve (a few months of supply). Europe gets 12% to 14% of its LNG from Qatar, through the strait.

The Persian Gulf is also a major hub for global fertilizer production and exports. In the 2020s the region has accounted for roughly 30% – 35% of global urea exports and around 20% – 30% of ammonia exports. Overall, up to 30% of internationally traded fertilizers normally transit the Strait of Hormuz.

=== Geopolitical tensions ===
Tensions between Iran and the United States resulted in the 1988 Operation Praying Mantis, included some European countries in the 2011–2012 Strait of Hormuz dispute, and again in 2019.

Tensions between Iran, the United States, and Israel escalated in the lead-up to 2026, stemming from failed nuclear negotiations in Geneva and a prior 12-day air conflict in 2025. Iran had signaled potential disruptions to the Strait of Hormuz in response to threats, including a temporary partial closure earlier in the month as a warning. From 15 to 20 February, Iran increased its oil export to three times its normal rate and reduced oil storage to reduce risk of disruptions. Saudi Arabia also attempted similar moves. In the days before the strikes, war-risk ship insurance premiums for the strait increased from 0.125% to between 0.2% and 0.4% of the ship insurance value per transit. For very large oil tankers, this is an increase of a quarter of a million dollars.

In briefings held before the February 2026 attacks, the Joint Chiefs of Staff warned President Trump that an attack could prompt Iran to close the strait. Trump acknowledged the warnings, but dismissed the possibility, telling his team that Iran would likely capitulate instead of closing the strait, and if they did, the US military could open it again.

=== Escalation ===
On 28 February 2026, the United States and Israel initiated coordinated airstrikes on Iran under Operation Epic Fury, targeting military facilities, nuclear sites, and leadership, resulting in the death of Supreme Leader Ali Khamenei. Iran responded with missile barrages on Israeli cities and US bases in the Gulf, including in the UAE, Qatar, and Bahrain, causing casualties and infrastructure damage. The conflict expanded to Lebanon, where Iran-backed Hezbollah launched rockets into Israel, prompting Israeli counterstrikes.

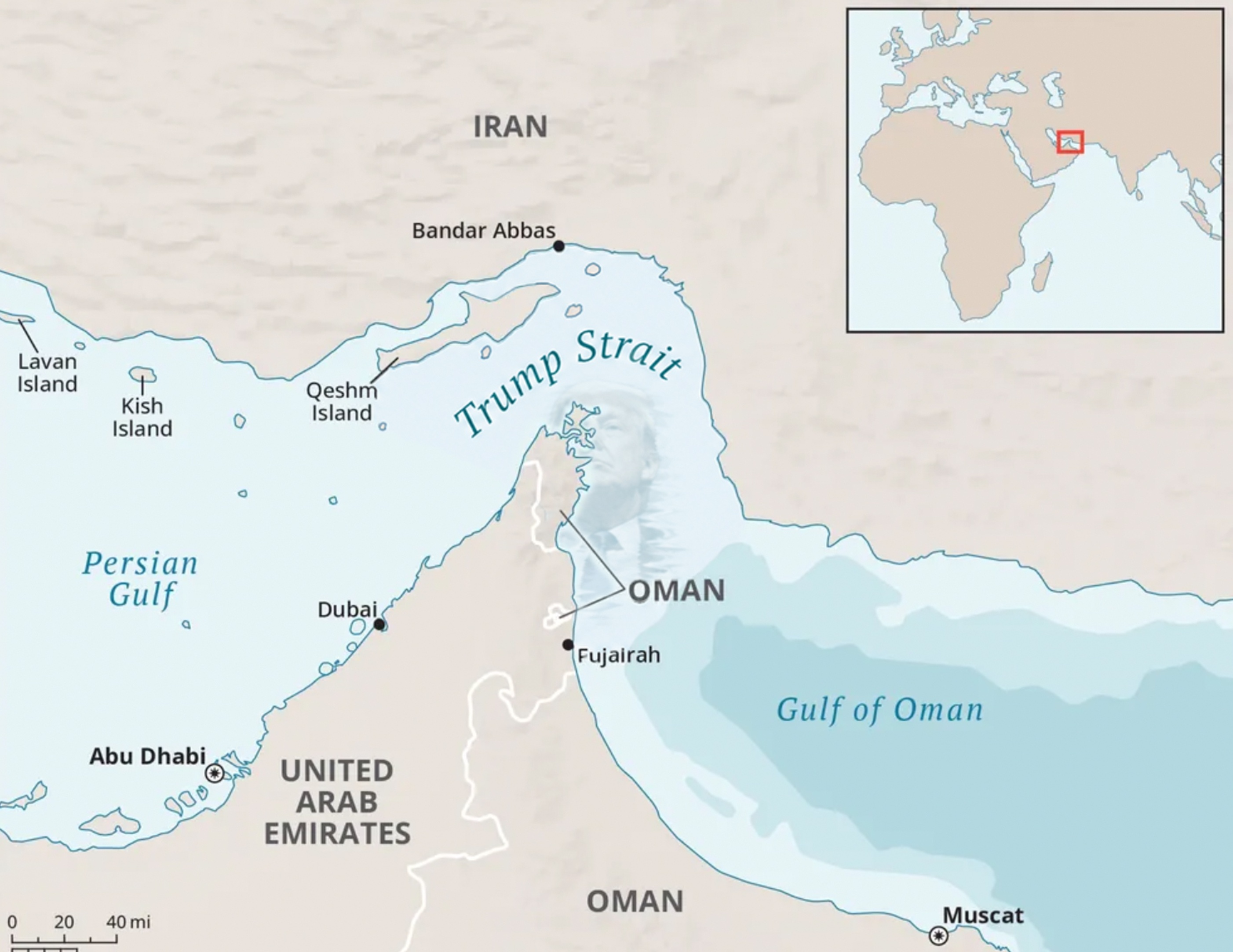
White House map of the "Trump Strait"

On 4 March, Iran announced that the Strait of Hormuz, a key waterway for the shipping of oil, LNG, and other products, was "closed", and threatened to attack any ship that attempted to pass it. It would eventually make exceptions for ships from countries it deemed to be "friends" of the republic, as with seven stranded Malaysian ships that it allowed to pass through the strait on 6 April. On 9 March, Iran declared that they would bring more security passage to the countries that expels US and Israel ambassadors. By 9 March, shipping insurance rates for the strait were reported to have increased by four to six times over the previous week, and the US government began to offer help to insurers under the Terrorism Risk Insurance Act, while continuing to warn commercial shipping against the area. The same day, Trump said that Iran's military had been destroyed, that the strait was open, and that the US might seize control of it from Iran to keep it open for commercial activity. On 27 March, he reaffirmed his desire to control the strait and also expressed interest in renaming it either to the "Strait of America" or to the "Strait of Trump", later referencing the latter name in a speech.

== Iranian blockade ==
=== List of ships attacked by Iran ===
| # | Date | Name | Flag | Type | Result | Sources |
|---|---|---|---|---|---|---|
| 1 | 1 March 2026 | Skylight | Palau | Oil tanker | Abandoned; 2 crew killed, including captain | |
| 2 | 1 March 2026 | MKD Vyom | Marshall Islands | Oil tanker | Abandoned; 1 crew killed | |
| – | 1 March 2026 | Sea La Donna (Note: Attack unverified) | Liberia | Oil/chemical tanker | Unknown | |
| 3 | 1 March 2026 | Hercules Star | Gibraltar | Oil tanker | Minor damage | |
| 4 | 1 March 2026 | Ocean Electra | Liberia | Tanker | Minor damage | |
| 5 | 1–2 March 2026 | LCT Ayeh | United Arab Emirates | Oil tanker | Damaged | |
| 6 | 2 March 2026 | Stena Imperative | United States | Products tanker | Damaged | |
| 7 | 2 March 2026 | Athe Nova | Honduras | Bitumen tanker | Damaged | |
| 8 | 2 March 2026 | Gold Oak | Panama | Bulk carrier | Minor damage | |
| 9 | 3 March 2026 | Pelagia | Malta | Bulk carrier | Unharmed | |
| 10 | 3 March 2026 | Libra Trader | Marshall Islands | Crude oil tanker | Minor damage | |
| 11 | 4 March 2026 | MSC Grace | Liberia | Container ship | Unharmed | |
| 12 | 4 March 2026 | Safeen Prestige | Malta | Container ship | Abandoned | |
| 13 | 4 March 2026 | Sonangol Namibe | Bahamas | Oil tanker | Damaged | |
| 14 | 6 March 2026 | Mussafah 2 | United Arab Emirates | Tugboat | Sank; 4 crew dead | |
| – | 7 March 2026 | Prima (Note: Claimed by Iran/IRGC) | Malta | Oil/chemical tanker | Unknown | |
| – | 7 March 2026 | Louis P | Marshall Islands | Oil tanker | Unknown | |
| 15 | 10 March 2026 | Unknown | N/A | Bulk carrier | Unharmed | |
| 16 | 11 March 2026 | Mayuree Naree | Thailand | Bulk carrier | Aground; 3 crew killed | |
| 17 | 11 March 2026 | One Majesty | Japan | Container ship | Minor damage | |
| 18 | 11 March 2026 | Star Gwyneth | Marshall Islands | Bulk carrier | Damaged | |
| – | 11 March 2026 | Express Rome | Liberia | Container ship | Unknown | |
| 19 | 11 March 2026 | Safesea Vishnu | Marshall Islands | Oil tanker | Set ablaze; abandoned; 1 crew killed | |
| 20 | 11 March 2026 | Zefyros | Malta | Oil tanker | Set ablaze; abandoned | |
| 21 | 12 March 2026 | Source Blessing | Liberia | Container ship | Minor damage | |
| 22 | 17 March 2026 | Gas Al Ahmadiah | Kuwait | Tanker | Minor damage | |
| 23 | 18 March 2026 | Parimal | Palau | Chemical tanker | Abandoned; captain missing | |
| 24 | 19 March 2026 | Halul 69 | Qatar | Offshore vessel | Minor damage | |
| 25 | 21 March 2026 | Unknown | N/A | Bulk carrier | Unknown | |
| 26 | 30 March 2026 | Express Rome | Liberia | Container ship | Unharmed | |
| 27 | 31 March 2026 | Al Salmi | Kuwait | Oil tanker | Damaged | |
| 28 | 1 April 2026 | Aqua 1 | Panama | Oil tanker | Damaged | |
| – | 4 April 2026 | MSC Ishyka | Liberia | Container ship | Unknown | |
| 29 | 18 April 2026 | Sanmar Herald | India | Tanker | Unharmed | |
| 30 | 18 April 2026 | CMA CGM Everglade | France | Container ship | Damaged | |
| 31 | 18 April 2026 | Mein Schiff 4 | Malta | Cruise ship | Unharmed and escaped with 5 other cruise ships | |
| 32 | 22 April 2026 | MSC Epaminondas (aka Epimonidas) | Liberia | Container ship | Captured — 8 crew repatriated in June 2026 | |
| 33 | 22 April 2026 | MSC Francesca | Panama | Container ship | Captured | |
| 34 | 22 April 2026 | Euphoria | Panama | Container ship | Unharmed | |
| 35 | 3 May 2026 | Unknown | N/A | Bulk carrier | Unknown | |
| 36 | 3 May 2026 | Barakah | Liberia | Oil tanker | Damaged | |
| 37 | 4 May 2026 | HMM Namu | Panama | Cargo ship | Damaged | |
| 38 | 4 May 2026 | JV Innovation (Note: According to the United States) | Marshall Islands | Chemical tanker | Damaged | |
| 39 | 5 May 2026 | CMA CGM San Antonio | Malta | Container ship | Damaged | |
| 40 | 8 May 2026 | Ocean Koi | Barbados | Oil tanker | Captured | |
| 41 | 10 May 2026 | Safesea Neha | Marshall Islands | Bulk carrier | Minor damage | |
| 42 | 13 May 2026 | Haji Ali | India | Cargo ship | Sank | |
| 43 | 14 May 2026 | Hui Chuan | Honduras | Fishery research vessel | Captured | |
| 44 | 1 June 2026 | MSC Sariska V | Panama | Container ship | Damaged | |
| 45 | 25 June 2026 | Ever Lovely | Singapore | Container ship | Damaged | |
| 46 | 27 June 2026 | Kiku | Panama | Oil tanker | Damaged | |
| 47 | 6 July 2026 | Al Rekayyat | Marshall Islands | LNG tanker | Abandoned | |
| 48 | 6 July 2026 | Wedyan | Saudi Arabia | Oil tanker | Damaged | |
| 49 | 7 July 2026 | Cyprus Prosperity | Liberia | Oil tanker | Minor damage | |
| 50 | 11 July 2026 | GFS Galaxy | Cyprus | Container ship | Abandoned; 1 crew killed | |
| 51 | 14 July 2026 | Stolt Magnesium | Liberia | Chemical tanker | Abandoned | |
| 52 | 14 July 2026 | Mombasa B | Liberia | Oil tanker | Abandoned; 1 crew killed | |
| 53 | 14 July 2026 | Al Bahyah | Liberia | Oil tanker | Abandoned; 3 crew missing | |
| 54 | 20 July 2026 | Kavomaleas | Malta | Oil products tanker | Abandoned; captured | |
| 55 | 20 July 2026 | Acheloos | Liberia | Oil tanker | Damaged | |
| 56 | 20 July 2026 | Kaifan | Kuwait | Oil tanker | Damaged | |
| 57 | 31 July 2026 | Gaslog Shanghai | Bermuda | LNG tanker | Disabled | |
| 58 | 31 July 2026 | Unknown | Liberia | Tanker | Unharmed | |
| 59 | 3 August 2026 | Minoan Pioneer | Liberia | Bulk carrier | Abandoned; 1 crew missing | |
| 60 | 8 August 2026 | Unknown | N/A | Tanker | Damaged | |
| 61 | 13 August 2026 | Navig8 Messi | Singapore | Oil tanker | Minor damage | |
| 62 | 13 August 2026 | Tarif | Liberia | Crude oil tanker | Minor damage | |
| 63 | 14 August 2026 | Al Watan | Liberia | Bulk carrier | Damaged | |
| 64 | 18 August 2026 | Minoan Dignity | Liberia | Bulk carrier | Abandoned; 1 crew killed | |
| 65 | 24 August 2026 | Metro Venetian | Liberia | Oil tanker | Disabled | |
| 66 | 25 August 2026 | Al Salam II | Kuwait | Oil tanker | Damaged | |
| 67 | 29 August 2026 | Burgan | Kuwait | Oil/chemical products tanker | Abandoned | |
| 68 | 31 August 2026 | Sidr | Saudi Arabia | Oil tanker | Abandoned; 2 crew killed | |
| 69 | 31 August 2026 | Senegal Prosperity | Liberia | Oil tanker | Abandoned | |
| 70 | 9 September 2026 | Hercules Star | Gibraltar | Oil tanker | Damaged; 1 crew killed, 1 missing | |
| 71 | 9 September 2026 | New Andros | Panama | Oil tanker | Damaged | |
| 72 | 13 September 2026 | El Gaia | Panama | Oil tanker | Abandoned; 2 crew killed | |
| 73 | 16 September 2026 | Trend | Togo | Oil tanker | Disabled | |
| 74 | 16 September 2026 | Unknown | Panama | Tanker | Damaged | |
| 75 | 18 September 2026 | STI Steadfast | Marshall Islands | Oil tanker | Damaged | |
| 76 | 20 September 2026 | Al Maryah | Liberia | LPG tanker | Damaged | |
| 77 | 22 September 2026 | LR Stephanie | Isle of Man | Oil tanker | Damaged | |
| 78 | 23 September 2026 | Cape Dao | Antigua and Barbuda | Bulk carrier | Sank; 1 crew killed | |
| 79 | 28 September 2026 | Al Funtas | Kuwait | Oil tanker | Damaged | |
| 80 | 29 September 2026 | Mersin Prosperity | Liberia | Oil tanker | Damaged | |
| 81 | 29 September 2026 | Sinbad | Liberia | Oil tanker | Damaged | |
| 82 | 29 September 2026 | Al Ruwais | Liberia | Oil tanker | Damaged | |
| 83 | 1 October 2026 | Kazimah III | Kuwait | Oil tanker | Abandoned | |
| 84 | 2 October 2026 | Uhud | Panama | Oil tanker | Damaged | |
| 85 | 3 October 2026 | Ghana Prosperity | Liberia | Oil tanker | Damaged | |
| 86 | 4 October 2026 | Lipsi | Liberia | Oil tanker | Disabled | |
| 87 | 4 October 2026 | Cameroon Prosperity | Liberia | Oil tanker | Damaged | |
| 88 | 4 October 2026 | Gas Vela | Singapore | LPG tanker | Damaged | |
| 89 | 5 October 2026 | Maran Gas Mystras | Greece | LNG tanker | Damaged | |
| 90 | 6 October 2026 | On Peace | Panama | Oil tanker | Abandoned | |
| 91 | 7 October 2026 | Acers | Antigua and Barbuda | Oil/chemical tanker | Damaged | |
| 92 | 9 October 2026 | Gem No. 2 | Panama | Oil tanker | Damaged | |
| 93 | 10 October 2026 | Valthera | Marshall Islands | Oil tanker | Damaged | |
| 94 | 11 October 2026 | Petro Dolphin | Nicaragua | Oil tanker | Abandoned; 2 crew missing | |
| 95 | 11 October 2026 | Angola Prosperity | Liberia | Oil tanker | Damaged | |
| 96 | 11 October 2026 | Ever Vict | Bahamas | Oil tanker | Damaged | |
| 97 | 11 October 2026 | Kition M | Panama | Oil tanker | Damaged | |
| 98 | 11 October 2026 | DP World Kaveri | India | Container ship | Damaged | |
| 99 | 11 October 2026 | Al Maqam | Liberia | Bulk carrier | Disabled | |
| 100 | 13 October 2026 | Al Saadiyat | Marshall Islands | Container ship | Damaged | |
| 101 | 13 October 2026 | GFS Giselle | Singapore | Container ship | Minor damage | |
| 102 | 13 October 2026 | GFS Pride | Singapore | Container ship | Sank | |
| 103 | 13 October 2026 | Alfonso | Barbados | Oil tanker | Unknown | |
| 104 | 1 November 2026 | | | Oil tankers | Exploded | |

Footnotes:

=== Tools for closure ===
Iran's methods of restricting traffic in the strait include:

- Attacks from speed boats (500 to 1000+), missiles and drones are the physical way of keeping ships away.
- Iran has laid mines as a hidden threat which could be anywhere.
- Satellite spoofing and GNSS jamming makes navigation harder.

These three methods are easy to deploy and difficult to oppose, and prohibitively increase insurance cost, preventing most shipowners from sailing through.

=== Timeline ===
Within hours of the US and Israeli strikes on 28 February, the IRGC transmitted warnings via VHF radio to vessels in the strait, stating that no ships would be permitted to pass. Iran did not formally declare a blockade, but military and industry sources warned that safety could not be guaranteed, and several ships stayed in port or turned back. The threats led to a partial closure, with ship-tracking data first showing a 70% reduction in traffic.

==== March ====
On 1 March, the oil tanker Skylight was struck by a projectile north of Khasab, Oman, killing two Indian crew members and injuring three others. The rest of its 20 crew evacuated. It was sanctioned by the US Department of Treasury for links to the Iranian shadow fleet. The MKD VYOM was struck by a drone boat, sparking a fire and an explosion in its engine room. An Indian sailor was killed, and its 21 crew evacuated on the Panama-flagged MV SAND. Another Indian was critically wounded on the LCT Ayeh.

On 2 March 2026, a senior official in the IRGC officially confirmed that Iran had closed the strait, threatening any ship that attempted to pass the strait. The US-flagged Stena Imperative was struck twice at the port of Bahrain, causing a fire. A port worker was killed and two others hurt in the attack, though the ship's crew were unharmed. The Athe Nova, which has links to Iran, was struck by two drones after attempting to illegally cross, according to the IRGC-linked Tasnim News Agency.

Just after midnight on 2 March, no tankers in the strait broadcast automatic identification system signals, indicating low or no traffic, though with unreliable data and satellite navigation device basis. Protection and indemnity insurance, which is critical for shipping, was removed from 5 March, making the economic risk too high for ship owners to use the strait. It was declared a high-risk zone, requiring extra pay and the right of refusal for ships' crew. The strait remained legally open, but effectively closed.

On 4 March, the IRGC claimed that they had achieved complete control of the strait. By then, at least eight vessels had been damaged. A Malta-flagged ship, Safeen Prestige, was struck, forcing its crew to evacuate. Meanwhile, the Pola, which had earlier turned its AIS transponder off, managed to pass through the strait and deliver its cargo to the UAE, despite the blockade. Late at night, a large explosion caused by a sea drone struck the oil tanker Sonangol Namibe anchored near Mubarak Al Kabeer Port in Kuwait, more than 800 kilometres (500 mi) from the strait, representing a significant expansion of the conflict. The attack caused an oil spill that posed an environmental risk. A small vessel was observed leaving the scene following the attack. The IRGC said that it hit a US oil tanker. On 6 March, a tugboat dispatched to assist the Safeen Prestige was struck by two missiles and later sank, leaving at least three crew members missing. On 7 March, the IRGC claimed that it hit the oil tanker Prima with a drone in the Persian Gulf, and the US oil tanker Louis P with a drone in the strait.

On 10 March, a bulk carrier reported a nearby splash followed by an explosion 36 nautical miles (67 km; 41 mi) off Abu Dhabi, in the first reported maritime incident in days. Also that day, US military intelligence sources reported that Iran had begun planting naval mines in the Strait of Hormuz. Following the reports, US president Donald Trump demanded that Iran should immediately remove any mines it had planted, and the US military said it destroyed 16 Iranian minelayers. A large wave of attacks on ships was carried out on 11 March, with at least three vessels sustaining damage. Twenty crew members of the Thailand-flagged Mayuree Naree were rescued by the Royal Navy of Oman after the vessel caught fire, while three others were missing and later confirmed dead. An unverified attack was also claimed by the IRGC on the Express Rome. Later that day, two oil tankers were attacked by an Iranian drone boat off the Port of Basra, Iraq, setting them on fire and killing at least one crew member. The State Company for Iraqi Ports rescued 38 crew members aboard both vessels.

By 12 March, the UKMTO had received reports of 16 attacks on shipping and four 'suspicious incidents' in the Persian Gulf since the start of hostilities. On 17 March, Kuwait-flagged liquified petroleum tanker Gas Al Ahmadiah was hit by a projectile while anchored east of Fujairah, causing minor damage. The following day, Palau-flagged chemical tanker Parimal was struck east of Khor Fakkan, sparking a fire. Fifteen of its crew were evacuated onto a Cook Islands-flagged tanker, although the captain was reported missing. On 19 March, Qatar-flagged offshore vessel Halul 69 was hit by debris off Ras Laffan Industrial City, damaging the bridge window. On 21 March, a projectile exploded in the vicinity of an unidentified bulk carrier 15 nautical miles (28 km; 17 mi) north of Sharjah, although no injuries were reported.

On 26 March, Israeli defense minister Israel Katz said that Iranian navy commander Alireza Tangsiri was killed in an airstrike, accusing him of being directly responsible for the Strait of Hormuz closure.

On 27 March, Mayuree Naree went aground on Qeshm Island. The IRGC Navy also turned away three container ships from passing through the strait. The IRGC announced that movement through the strait for any vessel going "to and from" the ports of the US, Israel, and their allies is prohibited. On 30 March, the Liberia-flagged container ship Express Rome reported that two projectiles splashed in the water nearby the ship within one hour, 22 nautical miles (41 km; 25 mi) northeast of Ras Tanura, Saudi Arabia. No injuries or damage were reported. Early on 31 March, Kuwaiti very large crude carrier (VLCC) Al Salmi was struck by an Iranian drone while anchored at the Port of Dubai, causing a fire. The vessel was at full capacity at the time, and the Kuwait Petroleum Corporation warned of an oil spill. The fire was later contained, and no oil leak was reported.

==== April ====
On 1 April, the QatarEnergy oil tanker Aqua 1 was struck by two projectiles north of Doha, causing a fire that was extinguished. The IRGC claimed that the tanker was Israeli. On 4 April, the IRGC claimed that it attacked the MSC Ishyka with a drone in the Strait of Hormuz, claiming it was linked to Israel. The attack was not verified.

After the Strait of Hormuz reopened on April 17, ships headed toward the strait; however, only 13 tankers passed through, according to Starboard Marine Intelligence.

On 18 April, Iran said that it closed the strait after threatening to do so in response to the US blockade. Two India-flagged ships were targeted by gunfire in the strait and forced to turn back, with the VLCC Sanmar Herald coming under fire from two Iranian gunboats despite having received clearance to pass. Later, a container ship reported damage from a rocket attack off the coast of Oman; no fires or injuries were caused. The vessel was later identified by French company CMA CGM as the CMA CGM Everglade. The cruise ship Mein Schiff 4 reported a nearby splash while off Oman. The master said that the IRGC threatened to fire at and destroy the ship via VHF radio.

On 22 April, an Iranian gunboat attacked the Greek-owned cargo ship Epaminondas off the coast of Oman, despite earlier giving it permission to cross the strait. The attack, consisting of gunfire and rocket-propelled grenades, caused significant damage to the bridge. Another ship, MSC Francesca, was targeted off the coast of Iran and instructed to drop anchor, with damage occurring to its hull and accommodation. Iran said that the ships ignored its warnings and were seized by the IRGC. The Greek Ministry of Shipping initially denied that the Epaminondas was captured, stating that it received extensive damage, but the ship's manager, Technomar, later confirmed that it was seized. A third ship, the Euphoria, was targeted, with Iranian media reporting that it became "stranded on the Iranian coast". It was later reported that the vessel was undamaged and resumed sailing after the attack.

On 23 April, Trump ordered the US Navy to destroy any Iranian boats laying mines in the strait.

==== May ====
On 3 May, an unidentified bulk carrier was attacked by several small boats west of Bandar Sirik, Iran; its crew were reported safe after the incident. Later that day, an oil tanker was attacked by projectiles north of Fujairah. The UAE identified the vessel as the Abu Dhabi National Oil Company-owned Barakah, which was empty at the time. The vessel was struck by two drones, although no injuries were reported. On 4 May, an explosion caused a fire aboard the HMM Namu, operated by the South Korea-based HMM, while it was anchored off the UAE. According to CENTCOM, Iran launched an attack against US-flagged ships consisting of cruise missiles, drones, and small craft. It added that some of the boats were destroyed by US attack helicopters, and Trump said that no damage occurred, other than to the South Korean vessel. On 5 May, the CMA CGM San Antonio was reportedly struck by a cruise missile in the Strait of Hormuz, injuring eight crew members.

On 5 May, Iran established the Persian Gulf Strait Authority to authorise and regulate maritime transit. On 7 May, Caixin reported that the chemical tanker JV Innovation was attacked, marking the first time a Chinese-owned vessel was targeted. The vessel reported a fire on board to other vessels near Mina Saqr, UAE, on 4 May. US envoy to the UN Mike Waltz accused Iran of conducting the attack. On 8 May, Iran seized the oil tanker Ocean Koi, accusing it of "trying to harm and disrupt oil exports". The tanker was sanctioned by the US in February, who accused it of transporting Iranian oil as part of its shadow fleet. On 10 May, the New Jersey-managed Safesea Nahu was hit by a projectile northeast of Qatar, causing a small fire that was extinguished.

On 13 May, Indian-flagged cargo ship Haji Ali was struck by a projectile off the coast of Oman while sailing from Somalia to Sharjah, causing a fire. The vessel's 14 crew were rescued by the Omani coast guard. The ship, which was carrying livestock, lost stability and later sank. India's Ministry of External Affairs condemned the attack without identifying a perpetrator. On 14 May, the fishery research vessel Hui Chuan was seized while anchored off Fujairah and redirected to Iran. The ship was reportedly used as a "floating armory" for maritime security firms combatting piracy.

==== June ====
On 1 June, two projectiles struck the MSC Sariska V at the Umm Qasr Port, causing no casualties. The IRGC said that the attack was in response to the US attack on the Gambia-flagged Lian Star on 29 May. On 25 June, the Singapore-flagged container ship Ever Lovely was attacked southeast of Dahit, Oman, causing the International Maritime Organization to pause a plan to evacuate 11,000 sailors from the strait, though the Ever Lovely was not participating in the IMO evacuation framework. Following the attack, the Persian Gulf Strait Authority reiterated a warning to ships not to traverse through undesignated routes. According to Trump, Iran launched four drones in the attack, and the other three were shot down. On 26 June, CENTCOM reported that it carried out retaliatory strikes on Iranian military targets in response to the attack on Ever Lovely, stating the operation struck infrastructure linked to missile and drone capabilities as well as coastal radar systems, including sites on Qeshm Island and other locations along Iran's southern coastline.

On 27 June, the oil tanker Kiku was struck by a projectile in the strait, damaging its bridge. CENTCOM said that the vessel was hit by an Iranian attack drone, and the US military responded by conducting airstrikes against Iranian military and communications sites near the strait.

==== July ====
Iranian sailors preparing to set naval mines in the Strait of Hormuz, July 2026

On 1 July, a United States Navy aviator was reported missing after a Sikorsky SH-60 Seahawk helicopter carrying four crew members assigned to the USS George H. W. Bush made an emergency landing in the Arabian Sea. The U.S. Naval Forces Central Command and the U.S. Fifth Fleet said there was no indication that hostile activity had contributed to the incident.

On 7 July, two tankers—the Qatari-owned LNG tanker Al Rekayat and Saudi-flagged supertanker Wedyan—were struck by projectiles in the Strait. Both ships were damaged, and Al Rekayat was evacuated after suffering a fire to its engine room, which put it at risk of exploding. Qatar accused Iran of being behind the attack on its tanker, while Iranian state media also suggested Iran's responsibility, although no official claims were made. Less than 24 hours later, the IRGC attacked a third vessel in the Strait. In response, the US Department of the Treasury reimposed sanctions on Iran's oil exports that were lifted after the signing of the Islamabad Memorandum, and later CENTCOM announced a wave of strikes targeting Iranian military sites near the Strait of Hormuz.

Early on 12 July, the IRGC Navy declared the strait closed after claiming it had fired warning shots at a ship attempting to cross an unauthorized route. CENTCOM accused Iran of striking the Cyprus-flagged container ship GFS Galaxy, causing heavy damage to its engine room. The vessel's crew, including 11 Indian nationals, abandoned ship in a lifeboat; 10 were later rescued while one remained missing. The missing man, who was from Pune, India, was confirmed dead on 14 July when his body was recovered by the Omani Navy. In response to the attack, the United States launched strikes against Iranian missile batteries, air defense systems, and IRGC fast attack boats at multiple locations around the Strait of Hormuz, including military targets on Qeshm Island. Iranian news agencies Mehr and Tasnim, citing a local official, reported that the strikes killed Iranian navy lieutenant Hamidreza Dehghani at the southern port of Jask.

Early on 14 July, Iran attacked three tankers in the strait. The first, the Norwegian-owned chemical tanker Stolt Magnesium, was attacked by a projectile northeast of Qalhat at 00:40. Shortly after, two UAE-owned oil tankers—the Mombasa B and Al Bahyah—in the Strait with cruise missiles. One Indian national was killed aboard the Mombasa, and eight others—six Indians and two Ukrainians—were injured. The IRGC claimed responsibility, claiming that it had struck and disabled "offending supertankers" that were entering a "mined route". All three tankers were disabled and had their crew evacuated, excluding three crewmen aboard Al Bahyah who were declared missing.

On 20 July, two Greek-owned tankers, the Kavomaleas and the Acheloos, were struck by projectiles on the Omani side of the Strait of Hormuz. A fire was sparked in the Kavomaleas's engine room, forcing its crew to evacuate. The tanker was reportedly towed into Iranian waters following the attack. Later, Kuwaiti tanker Kaifan was struck on its poop deck by a projectile off Oman, disabling its main engine and causing minor injuries to two crew. On 31 July, the Bermuda-flagged LNG tanker Gaslog Shanghai was struck and disabled by a projectile while exiting the Strait of Hormuz with Qatari LNG. That same day, a Liberia-flagged tanker reported that a projectile splashed into the water nearby northeast of Khasab.

==== August ====
On 3 August, the bulk carrier Minoan Pioneer was reportedly struck on its engine room by a projectile in the Strait, causing a blackout and leaving the third engineer missing. The attack resulted in an oil slick over 10 kilometres (6.2 mi) long, reaching Qeshm Island by 10 August. On 5 August, a tanker reported hearing two nearby explosions southeast of Kumzar. In early August 2026, US president Donald Trump asserted that he had "complete control" over the Strait of Hormuz, but Iran refuted this, stating that the strait would only be accessible if the US agreed to Iran's conditions. On 8 August, the UAE said that Iran struck an ADNOC-owned tanker with a missile while it was in the Strait of Hormuz. On 13 August, the ADNOC-owned tankers Navig8 Messi and Tarif were struck by UAVs in the Strait, causing minor damage to both vessels. The UAE accused Iran of being behind the attacks.

On 14 August, ADNOC announced that another one of its vessels were struck in the Strait the day prior, causing no casualties. The same day, the UKMTO reported an attack on a bulk carrier in the area, although it was unclear if these were the same incident. The vessel was later identified as bulk carrier Al Watan. On 18 August, the Greek-owned bulk carrier Minoan Dignity was attacked in the Strait, killing its chief engineer. The Omani Coast Guard assisted the crew after attempts to evacuate the ship via helicopter failed. On 16 August, Reuters reported that shipping traffic through the strait had fallen sharply over the weekend. According to Kpler’s ship-tracking data, five commodity-carrying vessels transited the strait on 15 August, while none were recorded on 16 August, compared with 31 crossings the previous weekend. Reuters also noted that some vessels might have passed undetected with their tracking transponders switched off.

On August 30, the United States targeted military sites on Larak Island in response to Iran’s deployment of missiles to lay naval mines in the Strait of Hormuz. In retaliation, Iran’s Islamic Revolutionary Guard Corps struck U.S. bases in Jordan.

According to the Iranian Revolutionary Guard Corps Navy, a large oil tanker caught fire and became immobilized on August 31 after striking two naval mines while traveling along an unauthorized route south of the Strait of Hormuz.

==== September ====
On 2 September, two oil tankers were struck by Iranian military forces while navigating an unauthorized route through the Strait of Hormuz, according to a report from the Iranian Revolutionary Guard Corps Public Relations.

On 5 September, the United States and Iran were involved in a standoff in the Strait of Hormuz. The United States attacked three Iranian ships, including a tanker near Kharg Island, and Iran responded by targeting a U.S. aircraft carrier and a navy destroyer with ballistic missiles, a move that maritime intelligence firm Marisks reported would escalate tensions in the strait. Iran also announced that it had attacked three oil tankers passing through an "unauthorized route" in the Strait of Hormuz. According to Iranian media, one of the Iranian Oil tankers was empty. As available statistics mentioned, due to Iranian and American attacks on ships, the number of cargo vessels passing through the Strait of Hormuz has dropped to its lowest level, with only 10 ships per day.

On 5 September, Iran announced through Mohsen Rezaei, the head of Iran’s Supreme National Security Council, that it would establish a “prohibited zone” around the Strait of Hormuz. This zone would begin from the U.S. naval blockade line to the loading ports.

On 7 September, an oil tanker loaded at a Saudi port was prevented from leaving the Strait of Hormuz. According to the analytics firm Kpler, there were 27 missile strikes in the Strait of Hormuz between July 6 and early September. Kpler reports that no large ships have passed through the strait since early September.

On 9 September, the oil tanker Hercules Star was attacked by a projectile off Dubai, killing one crew member and leaving another missing. The tanker New Andros was also attacked by a drone southeast of Al-Faw, Iraq. On 13 September, El Gaia was attacked north of the Musandam peninsula. The IRGC said that the tanker struck a mine, while the US said that it was hit by an Iranian drone. Most of the ship's crew was evacuated by Oman, although two members remained missing.

On 25 September, Iranian Foreign Minister Abbas Araghchi stated that reopening the Strait of Hormuz depends on the United States. He mentioned that shipping could resume within seven days if the U.S. accepts a plan sent through Qatar. The timeline starts once the plan is accepted. Actions by the U.S. can be completed in four to five days. Iran's suggestion to reopen the strait was rejected by Trump.

On September 27, Iran's IRGC announced it captured a US underwater drone in the Strait of Hormuz. They stated the Remus 600 drone is being examined for information. The IRGC also declared the Strait of Hormuz closed to unauthorized access. Iran stated that diplomacy is the only way to resolve its conflict with the U.S. and Israel, despite Trump's rejection of a proposal about the Strait of Hormuz.

==== October ====
On October 4, Mohammad Bagher Ghalibaf, Speaker of the Iranian Parliament, announced that the Strait of Hormuz would not open until the United States met the seven conditions Iran set in the June agreement. He stated that Washington "must realize that the era of dragging out the (diplomatic) process and imposing unilateral demands has come to an end."

On 5 October, Data showed that the seven-day average for crude exports was 18.3 million barrels per day by September 30, with exports surpassing pre-war figures on 14 days in September. This increase was largely due to Saudi Arabia's oil loading, following an attack on its pipeline.

On the week between 28 September and 5 October, at least 12 ship attacks had been recorded in the Strait of Hormuz, marking the most attacks on vessels in the area since the Iran war began. On 6 October, 12 crewmembers were injured in an attack on the UAE-owned tanker On Peace. On 7 October, several crew aboard the Acers suffered minor injuries after the tanker was attacked by multiple projectiles north of Madinat ash Shamal, Qatar, in the first attack outside the Strait in almost a month. Maritime risk intelligence firm Clearwater Dynamics warned that the attack could signal a wider area of risk for shipping, extending to waters near Qatar, Bahrain, Saudi Arabia, Kuwait and Iraq.

On 7 October 2026, Mohammadreza Naqdi, an adviser to the commander of Iran's Islamic Revolutionary Guard Corps, said Iran would soon close routes through the Strait of Hormuz that it considered illegal. According to Reuters, he was referring to a passage south of the strait along the Omani coast, which he said small boats used to smuggle oil and transfer it to tankers. His remarks came as attacks on tankers continued and control of shipping routes through the strait remained disputed. On October 7, maritime security companies reported that the number of attacks on passing oil tankers this week had reached its highest level since the 2026 war, and the price of oil had surpassed $100 per barrel. Twelve attacks have been carried out against ships carrying liquefied gas. An oil tanker was struck by several projectiles while transiting off the northern coast of Qatar. The United Kingdom Maritime Trade Operations (UKMTO) did not disclose the vessel's nationality or origin.

On 9 October, the Panama-flagged oil tanker "Gem No. 2" was struck by an unidentified projectile about 13 nautical miles west of Al Jazeera in the United Arab Emirates, outside the Strait of Hormuz. The impact caused a fire on board, which was later extinguished. No group claimed responsibility for the attack.

BBC Verify found that 12 vessels reported attacks in the week of 5–11 October 2026—the highest weekly total since the US-Israeli war with Iran began. Ten ships had reported attacks the week before, and six were struck on Sunday 5 October alone, the most in a single day. Four further attacks were reported the following week. According to experts, Iran's attacks on shipping have intensified as it seeks to strengthen its control over the waterway, responding to the US military's escort of a growing number of tankers through the southern part of the strait to avoid Iranian strikes. Vessels farther from the Strait of Hormuz have also come under more frequent attack. Martin Kelly, chief executive of Orbital Risk Intelligence, said Iran had "evolved its strategy" as its grip on the strait loosened and was conducting "near daily or multiple attacks every single day." He added: "The aim here is to stop the ships going through and to deter others." According to state media, the IRGC's navy said its strikes would not be "limited to the Strait of Hormuz" and later announced a "new deployment formation" across the region.

On 14 October, the Singapore-flagged container ship GFS Pride sank after being attacked in the Strait. Iran claimed that the vessel struck a naval mine. The same day, the Cape Dao, which was attacked on 23 September, also sank.

On October 16, 2026, according to the latest report from the United Kingdom Maritime Trade Operations (UKMTO), vessel traffic through the Strait of Hormuz is approximately 70 percent lower than before the war. The organization recorded 12 attacks on vessels over the past seven days, 10 of which occurred in the Strait of Hormuz. UKMTO said it was difficult to determine the actual number of attacks because most vessels targeted in the region did not report them. The Tanzania-flagged supertanker Loyalty was struck by a rocket-propelled grenade launched from a small boat, according to maritime security company Vanguard. The attack damaged a freshwater tank. A crew member said the vessel was carrying approximately two million barrels of Iraqi crude oil.

According to the Joint Maritime Information Center (JMIC), maritime security risks in the Middle East remain high, highlighted by a recent attack on an LPG tanker near Oman. On October 22, the tanker was struck by an unidentified projectile; however, no casualties or environmental damage were reported. The threat level in the Strait of Hormuz is severe, characterized by reduced commercial traffic and persistent congestion in the area.

On October 29, 2026, amid a monthly high of more than thirty strikes in the region, maritime sources reported that a small boat attached two limpet mines — naval explosives designed to stick to a ship's hull — to an oil tanker in the Strait of Hormuz. This caused a fire in the engine room and temporarily disabled the ship, but did not result in any casualties or oil leaks. After an unsuccessful attempt using unexploded devices in September, this is the first time adhesive limpet explosives have been successfully used in this area since tensions between the United States and Iran began in February. The incident took place 25 nautical miles (46 kilometers) northeast of Khasab, Oman. According to assessments from three maritime security sources, the targeted tanker was a Panama-flagged vessel named "Louise 1", which was operated by at least 27 Indian seafarers. The attack prompted safety interventions from India's Ministry of Ports, Shipping and Waterways.

The Nakilat-operated LNG carrier "Al Mayeda" was hit by "unidentified objects" in the Persian Gulf on the evening of 30 October 2026. According to the Qatar News Agency, there were no environmental damage or crew casualties, and the ship was able to continue normally. The incident happened immediately after Iranian officials were hosted by Qatari mediators in Doha for ceasefire negotiations, and it followed the 7 July targeting of the Qatari carrier "Al Rekayyat." Later, the Navy of the Islamic Revolutionary Guard Corps (IRGC) reported that four oil tankers in the Strait of Hormuz were intercepted after attempting to traverse unauthorized routes, and subsequently caught fire following collisions with naval mines. The vessels had reportedly disabled their navigation systems and ignored repeated warnings by Iranian forces. The IRGC Navy announced that an oil tanker carrying more than 2 million barrels of crude oil hit a mine, causing a massive explosion and setting the ship on fire. The United Kingdom Maritime Trade Operations (UKMTO) received a report that a vessel about 40 nautical miles (74 kilometers) south of Iran’s Lavan Island was hit on its port side by an unknown projectile, which led to a fire. The organization confirmed that the crew is safe and no environmental damage has been reported. Additionally, Iranian state media stated that Iranian forces shot down and captured a U.S. drone, identified as an "MQM-170," near Qeshm Island, close to the Strait of Hormuz. The U.S. military has not yet commented on this incident.

==== November ====
On November 2, alongside what the U.S. military described as "defensive strikes" in the Strait of Hormuz, multiple explosions were reported on Iran's Qeshm Island. Witnesses saw aircraft flying over the island, and blasts were also heard near Bandar Lengeh, coming from the sea. U.S. officials explained that these strikes aimed to prevent Iranian attacks on commercial ships. The actions were in response to a previous incident where Iran’s Islamic Revolutionary Guard Corps (IRGC) fired at a U.S. aircraft, but the situation did not escalate into a larger military conflict.

On November 2nd, Iran has expressed readiness to reopen the Strait of Hormuz within two days, provided the U.S. meets specific conditions. A delegation from Qatar is currently in Tehran to assist in negotiating an agreement between Iran and the United States. Iran's conditions involve lifting sanctions and unfreezing assets, demands that the U.S. might find difficult to accept. After attacks by U.S. and Israeli forces, Iran closed the Strait, affecting global oil markets. Military plans for further strikes on Iran are under consideration, and Iranian officials have suggested they may withdraw from the Nuclear Nonproliferation Treaty if they face another attack.

On 10 November, Iranian state media reported that the Islamic Revolutionary Guard Corps had attacked and destroyed what it described as "enemy navigation systems" on Oman's Didamar Island in the Strait of Hormuz. Reuters subsequently reported, citing three sources familiar with the matter, that Iranian forces had attacked maritime navigation systems on the island. The agency also verified video footage showing smoke rising from Didamar and reported thermal activity in satellite imagery captured by the European Union's Copernicus programme. However, the cause of the smoke and the extent of any damage remained unclear. Reuters said it could not independently verify whether the navigation systems had been destroyed. A senior Omani official told The Maritime Executive that the island's navigation aids had not been hit. The publication also reported that available satellite imagery showed no obvious damage to the lighthouse or the radio and radar masts, although damage to the masts might not be visible at the imagery's resolution. Shipping and maritime-security sources cited by Reuters said that any damage was likely to have little impact on commercial traffic because alternative navigation systems were available elsewhere in the strait.

On 14 November, the Iranian Navy reported that an oil tanker had struck a naval mine in the eastern Strait of Hormuz and caught fire. The navy described the incident as the fifth of its kind within 24 hours. The report was published by Al Jazeera.

On 15 November, the United Kingdom Maritime Trade Operations (UKMTO) said it had received a report from Indian shipping authorities of an attack on an eastbound oil tanker transiting the Persian Gulf before entering the Strait of Hormuz. The crew was reported safe, but the extent of the damage and any environmental impact were unknown at the time. Maritime security firm Vanguard Tech identified the vessel as the Thenamaris-operated VLCC Al Dhannah and reported that it had been struck in the steering gear room at the stern. The tanker subsequently headed back towards Dubai.

=== Exceptions to the blockade ===
On 4 March, reports emerged that Iran would allow only Chinese vessels to pass through the strait, citing China's supportive stance towards Iran since the conflict intensified. China is the largest buyer of Iranian oil, and had stressed the importance of protecting global shipping routes. Subsequently, on 5 March, the bulk carrier Iron Maiden, operated by Cetus Maritime Shanghai Ltd., transited the strait while signalling "CHINA OWNER". Earlier, the LPG tanker Bogazici had broadcast that it was a Muslim-owned and Turkish-operated vessel, and successfully passed through. On 7 March, another bulk carrier, the Liberia-flagged Sino Ocean, broadcast its Chinese-owned-and-operated status to transit the strait after picking up its cargo from the UAE's Mina Saqr port.

On 5 March, the IRGC announced that Iran would keep the Strait of Hormuz closed only to ships from the US, Israel and their Western allies. This was confirmed again on 8 March. On 13 March, Turkish transport minister Abdulkadir Uraloğlu said that Iran approved the passage of a Turkish ship through the strait. It was also reported that two Indian-flagged gas carriers and a Saudi oil tanker with 1 million barrels for India were allowed to pass, as were several other ships.

Between 14 and 24 March 5 India-flagged LPG carriers were evacuated from the Strait of Hormuz in three different occasions. They were escorted by Indian Navy warships through the Gulf of Oman after they crossed Hormuz under Operation Sankalp.

On 26 March, the foreign minister of Iran, Abbas Araghchi, announced that ships owned by five nations, including China, Russia, India, Iraq and Pakistan, would be allowed to transit the Strait of Hormuz. In addition, Malaysian and Thai vessels were granted access through the strait after successful talks with the president of Iran, Masoud Pezeshkian and Iran’s ambassador to Thailand respectively. Iran also agreed to a request by the UN to allow humanitarian and fertilizer shipments through the strait on 27 March, to address the disruption to the fertilizer supply during the spring planting season. On 2 April, Iran said it will allow Philippine-flagged vessels and Filipino seafarers to cross the strait following talks. Russian superyacht Nord, owned by billionaire Alexey Mordashov, crossed out of the gulf on 25 April without trouble from the Iranian or American navies.

=== Bypassing and escorting ===
The Iranian area of the strait is theoretically avoidable through the territorial waters of Oman and the UAE on the south. In particular, Oman's deep-water ports of Duqm, Salalah and Sohar in the Arabian Sea outside the strait allow tankers to bypass the choke point. However, in March 2026 several drones struck Duqm and Salalah, with at least one fuel storage tank in Duqm damaged. Sohar, in turn, fell within an insurer's war risk area, potentially increasing charter and insurance costs for ships. The Joint War Committee of the London insurance market included waters around Oman into its list of high-risk maritime areas.

As of 10 March, Saudi Arabia increasingly diverted oil to the Red Sea port of Yanbu via the East–West Crude Oil Pipeline, which runs from the eastern oil fields, while the UAE diverted oil via the Abu Dhabi Crude Oil Pipeline to the port of Fujairah on the Arabian Sea. Iraq has an alternative route in the form of the Kirkuk–Ceyhan Oil Pipeline, going to the Mediterranean coast through Turkey. The combined capacity of these pipelines is about nine million barrels per day, less than the roughly 20 million barrels per day that can pass through the strait. The Red Sea route is also vulnerable to possible Houthi attacks.

In the short term, it is possible to escort 3–4 commercial ships a day with 7–8 destroyers providing air cover, depending on the risk from Iranian midget submarines; however, doing so sustainably for months requires more resources. India and Pakistan sent destroyers to escort tankers in the Gulf of Oman, although not in the Strait of Hormuz. The Indian Navy is executing Operation Urja Suraksha as of 25 March under which over five frontline warships, including destroyers and frigates, were deployed to the region to escort over 20 Indian flagged cargo ships that are on the west of Hormuz. On 11 April, it was reported that the US navy had begun an operation to clear naval mines laid by Iran during the war.

== United States blockade ==
On 11 April, Trump said that American forces had started had started "clearing" the strait. Iran claimed that an American vessel on its way to the strait turned back after a warning. The Wall Street Journal reported that several US Navy destroyers entered the Strait of Hormuz for the first time since the war began. A US official described it as an "operation that focused on freedom of navigation through International waters". Iran reportedly threatened to attack the ships, accusing the US of a ceasefire violation. US Central Command said the ships were taking part in mine clearance operations. According to one report, Iran lost track of mines that it had planted in the Strait of Hormuz and is therefore unable to fully open the strait. On 12 April, JD Vance announced that the Islamabad Talks between the US and Iran had failed. Afterwards, Trump declared a US naval blockade of the Strait of Hormuz, announcing that the US Navy would prevent ships from entering or exiting the strait and would intercept ships that had paid tolls to Iran. CENTCOM clarified that the blockade would begin on 13 April and would be enforced on all ships entering or leaving Iranian ports and coastal areas but would not "impede freedom of navigation for vessels transiting the Strait of Hormuz to and from non-Iranian ports". The IRGC Navy said that any military vessel approaching the strait would be considered a ceasefire violation and would meet a "severe response." On 15 July, CENTCOM said that the US reinstated the naval blockade day before. On August 12, a Panamanian-flagged vessel was struck by two Hellfire missiles fired from a U.S. Navy MH-60 helicopter in the Gulf of Oman near Pakistan, following its disregard of warnings to cease breaching an Iranian naval blockade. Simultaneously, the Houthis launched an attack on a Saudi vessel in the Bab al-Mandab Strait.

On 15 November, the USS Theodore Roosevelt joined the USS George H.W. Bush and USS George Washington to form a three-carrier US naval presence in the Middle East amidst increased Iranian attacks. The US Navy later withdrew the USS George Washington from the Middle East, leaving two aircraft carriers deployed off Iran.

On November 20, the U.S. military intensified its naval blockade against Iran, cautioning that ships accepting cargo transferred from Iranian vessels might be subject to military intervention. U.S. Central Command said ships taking on cargo from Iranian ports could be seen as trying to bypass the blockade. This measure is intended to stop Iranian oil from entering international markets. The action faced threats of retaliation from Iran's Revolutionary Guard.

=== List of ships attacked by the United States ===
List of ships attacked by the United States
| # | Date | Name | Flag | Type | Result | Sources |
|---|---|---|---|---|---|---|
| 1 | 19 April 2026 | Touska | Iran | Container ship | Disabled; captured; Intercepted by USS Spruance in the northern Arabian Sea | |
| 2 | April 2026 | Deep Sea | Iran | Oil tanker | Captured; Intercepted off Malaysia. | |
| 3 | 20 April 2026 | Dorena | Iran | Supertanker | Captured; Intercepted off southern India. | |
| 4 | April 2026 | Sevin | Iran | Oil tanker | Captured; Intercepted off Malaysia. | |
| 5 | April 2026 | Derya | Iran | Oil tanker | Captured; Intercepted off western India. | |
| 6 | 21 April 2026 | Tifani | Botswana | Supertanker | Captured; Intercepted in the Indian Ocean. | |
| 7 | 22 April 2026 | Majestic X | Guyana | Oil tanker | Captured; Intercepted in the Indian Ocean. | |
| 8 | 24 April 2026 | Unknown | Iran | Oil tanker | Captured; Intercepted in the Persian Gulf by USS Rafael Peralta, according to CENTCOM. | |
| 9 | 25 April 2026 | Sevan | Panama | LPG tanker | Captured; Intercepted in the Arabian Sea by an U.S. Navy helicopter and USS Pinckney. | |
| 10 | 30 May 2026 | Lian Star | The Gambia | Bulk carrier | Disabled; Intercepted in the Gulf of Oman by U.S. military aircraft. | |
| 11 | 8 June 2026 | Marivex | Palau | Oil tanker | Disabled; Intercepted in the Gulf of Oman by U.S. military aircraft. | |
| 12 | 9 June 2026 | Settebello | Palau | Oil tanker | Disabled; Intercepted in the Gulf of Oman by U.S. military aircraft. Three Indian sailors killed, 21 rescued by the Royal Navy of Oman. | |
| 13 | 10 June 2026 | Jalveer | Guinea-Bissau | Oil tanker | Disabled; Intercepted in the Gulf of Oman by U.S. military aircraft. | |
| 14 | 15 July 2026 | Belma | Curaçao | Oil tanker | Disabled; Intercepted in the Persian Gulf by Hellfire missiles. | |
| 15 | 24 July 2026 | Lavine | Mozambique | Oil tanker | Disabled | |

== Impacts ==
=== Passage through the strait ===
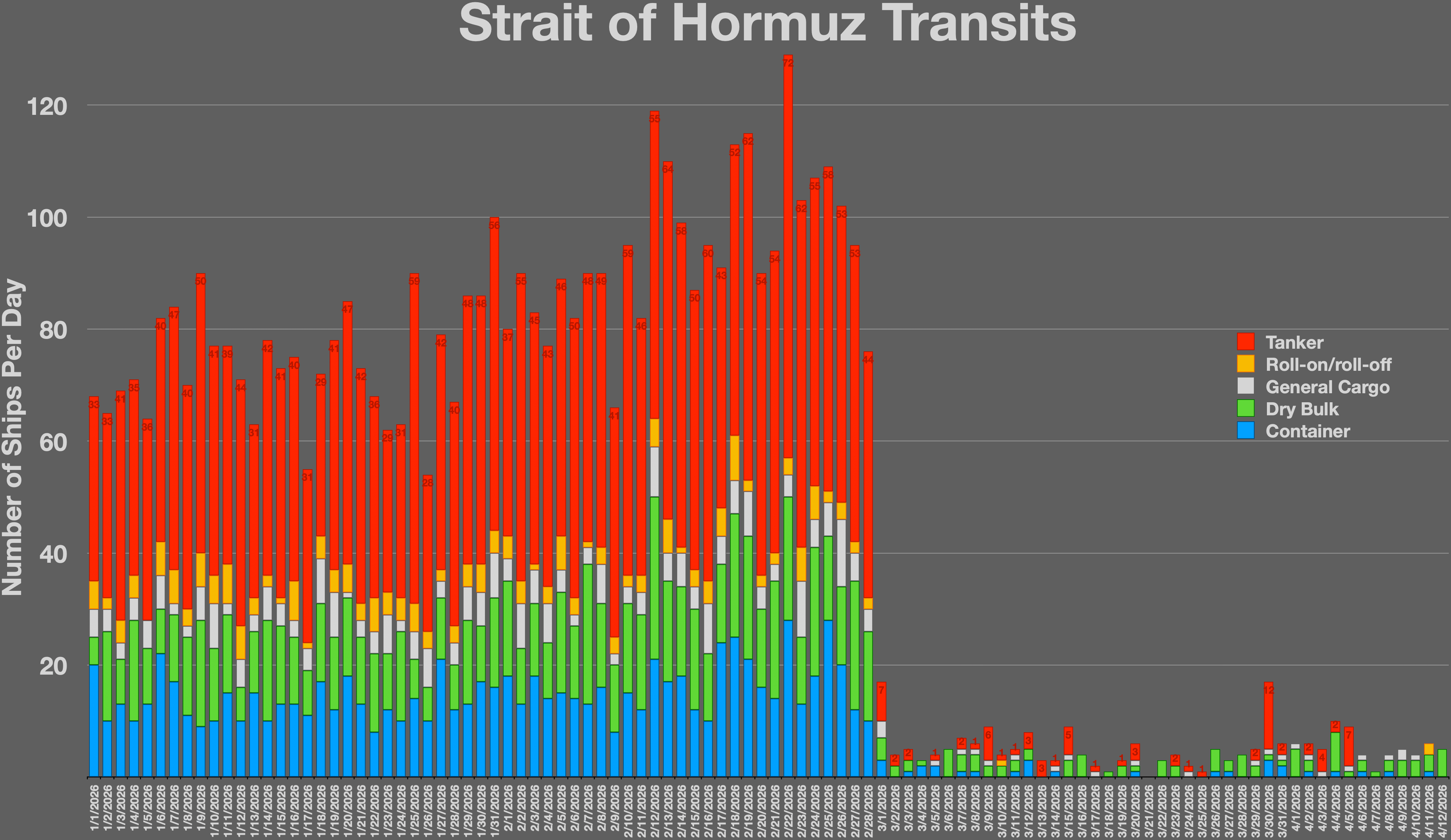
February to April 2026 Strait of Hormuz transits

Late on 28 February, outgoing traffic through the Strait of Hormuz was heavy, while incoming traffic was light. At least three tankers were struck near the strait, including one off Oman that was set ablaze. At least 17 oil tankers continued travelling through the strait. On 1 and 2 March, no ships appeared in the strait. Major container shipping companies, including Maersk, CMA CGM, and Hapag-Lloyd, suspended transits through the strait and related routes such as the Red Sea. Houthi-controlled Yemen announced on 28 February that it would resume attacks on Israel and commercial ships in the Red Sea, forcing Suez Canal traffic to be rerouted around Africa's Cape of Good Hope. This added weeks to transit times and increased shipping costs. The crisis disrupted global energy supplies and stranded tankers in the Persian Gulf.

Cruise ships reduced activity in the Persian Gulf and stopped using the strait, stranding 15,000 passengers on at least six major cruise ships: Saudi-based cruise line Aroya Cruises' eponymous Aroya; two ships owned by Celestyal Cruises, Celestyal Discovery and Celestyal Journey; MSC Euribia of MSC Cruises; and two TUI Cruises ships, Mein Schiff 4 and Mein Schiff 5. On 15 March, an Iranian commander said that Iran would continue to use the Strait of Hormuz as a pressure point. Several ships have passed the strait during the conflict, mostly petroleum ships bound for China and India. On 16 March, a Pakistani oil tanker crossed the Strait of Hormuz with Iranian permission. Iran set up its own shipping channel, north of Larak Island rather than the main channel south of the island. One ship paid $2 million to use Iran's channel. Unaffected by the war, 20 Iranian vessels per day used the Iranian port of Bandar Abbas. On 26 March, Malaysia said that Iran allowed its ships to pass through the strait. According to Lloyd's List, payments were being assessed by the Iranian Revolutionary Guards in Chinese yuan.

On 3 April, a French ship crossed the Strait of Hormuz.

On 9 April, there was no sign that a recent agreement to lift the Iranian blockade of Strait of Hormuz was being implemented, with ships once again being prevented from passing through the strait. Abu Dhabi National Oil Company CEO Sultan Al Jaber said on that day that the strait was still not open, despite the Iran war ceasefire, because Iran is restricting and conditioning traffic. He added that 230 loaded oil tankers are waiting inside the Gulf.

Around 18 April, during a brief time window where both Iran and United States claimed the Strait was open, all six cruise ships sailed from the Persian Gulf through the Strait, into the Arabian Sea and beyond, resuming their commercial schedule elsewhere.

On 19 April, Mohammad Rezaei-Kouchi, head of the Iranian parliament’s construction committee, said that the Iranian parliament was planning to pass a law that boats from "hostile" countries cannot pass the Strait, and that all others will need to pay tolls. By 20 April, traffic through the Strait had dropped sharply again, as on 1 March.

The International Maritime Organization reported on 21 April that about 20,000 mariners and 2,000 ships remained stranded in the Persian Gulf because of the closure. On 11 May, Saudi Aramco CEO Amin Nasser said that over 600 ships, mostly tankers, were stuck inside the Persian Gulf, and another 240 were waiting on the other side of the strait.

While passage through the strait was curtailed, small boat, particularly speedboat, commercial traffic across the strait continued.

By late September 2026 flow of crude across the Hormuz increased due to Abu Dhabi National Oil Company (ADNOC) adopting a Ship-to-Ship transfer system. Shuttle ships of ADNOC transport crude from Gulf terminals to the Gulf of Oman where the oil is loaded to larger vessels which then export the oil.

On 5 October, Saudi Aramco CEO Amin Nasser warned that about 3 billion barrels of oil have been lost globally due to current crises, impacting energy security. He noted the severe effects on global maritime shipping and the unprecedented pressure on supply chains and logistics. To address these challenges, Aramco is considering new routes for crude oil exports and expanding storage facilities outside Saudi Arabia. Nasser mentioned that over one billion barrels have been taken from inventories to meet shortages, with remaining commercial stocks under 6 billion barrels largely unavailable for trading. He stated that while emergency reserves may suffice for winter, they won't solve the long-term supply issues, which could take up to two years to resolve.

On 21 October, The Wall Street Journal reported that Middle Eastern oil exports, including shipments through the Strait of Hormuz and alternative routes, had averaged more than 24 million barrels per day in the week ending 18 October, exceeding the pre-war level of 23.3 million, according to Kpler. However, preliminary estimates put flows through Hormuz, including offshore transfers in the Gulf of Oman, at approximately 14 million barrels per day, or 82% of pre-war levels. Despite the recovery in exports, shipping costs remained high. Kpler estimated freight costs for supertankers carrying Gulf crude to China at approximately US$37.37 per barrel. Traders also expressed concern that renewed fighting could interrupt the recovery.

=== Global economy ===
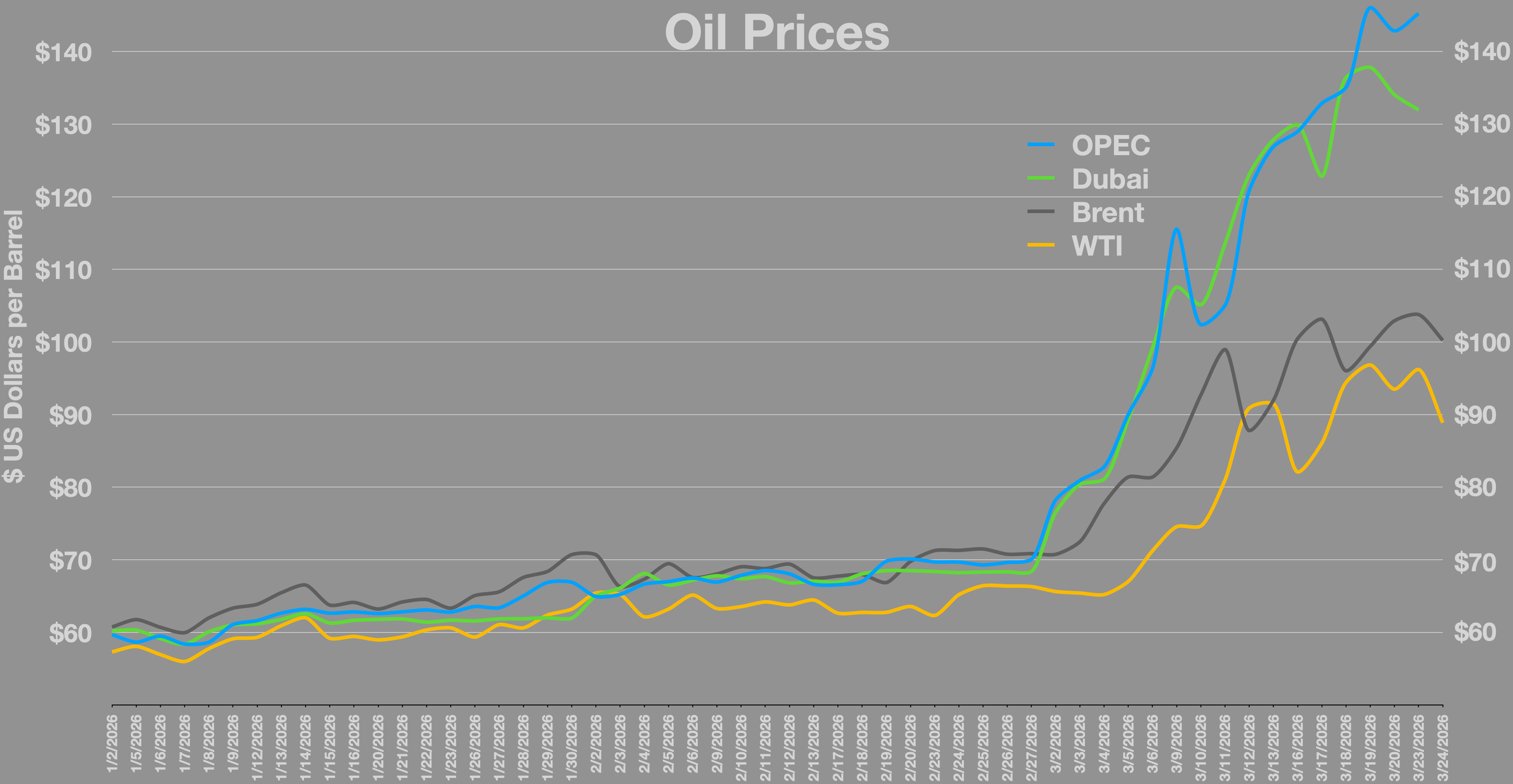
Oil prices OPEC Reference Basket Dubai Crude Brent Crude West Texas Intermediate

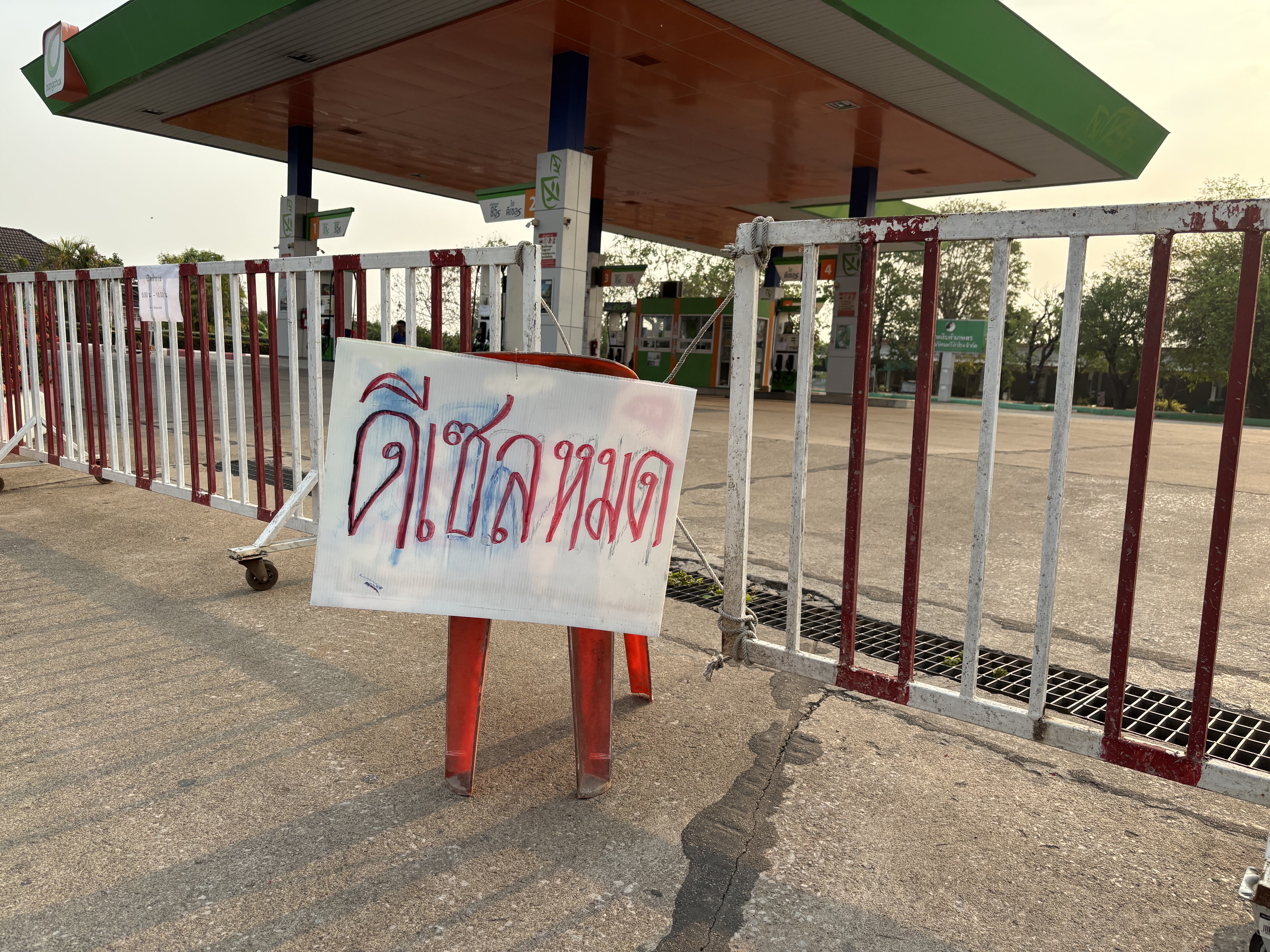
A Bangchak petrol station in Thailand closing with a sign stating "out of diesel" on 22 March 2026 as the country was hit by a fuel shortage due to its reliance on shipping via the Strait of Hormuz

The restriction of shipments by more than 90% (around 10 million barrels per day of oil production) raised energy and agricultural input costs worldwide. Roughly 20% of the world's oil and LNG normally passes through the strait, and the disruptions caused Brent crude prices to jump by 10–13% in early trading, with analysts warning they could reach $100 per barrel or higher if disruptions persist. The spike in prices is especially problematic in Asia, where major importers like China and India could face supply shortages and price volatility. Natural gas prices in Europe also surged, rising from €30/MWh the past week, to €46/MWh on Monday, 2 March, peaking above €60/MWh on Tuesday, 3 March (nearly double from previous week), before decreasing again to €48/MWh on Wednesday, 4 March. The shipping disruption contributed to volatility in United Kingdom energy markets, with analysts warning that wholesale gas price increases could raise household energy bills and expose the country's reliance on global fuel markets.

The crisis has been described as the largest disruption to the energy supply since the 1970s oil crises and as the largest in the history of the global oil market. Analysts from institutions like Barclays and Goldman Sachs highlighted risks of sustained high oil prices if the strait is restricted over a longer period. The disruptions also raised concerns over inflation and potential economic downturns in oil-importing nations.

OPEC+ pledged to increase oil output by 206,000 barrels per day to mitigate shortages. Due to rising tensions in the Middle East, Japanese refiners have asked the government to release some of their stockpiled oil. The refiners obtain about 95% of their crude oil from Saudi Arabia, Kuwait, the United Arab Emirates, and Qatar. About 70% of this Middle Eastern oil is delivered to Japan by ships that pass through the Strait of Hormuz. On 4 March, Pakistan, a country reliant on imported oil that was looking for alternative shipment routes due to the closure, officially requested that Saudi Arabia reroute oil supplies through the port of Yanbu on the Red Sea, with Saudi Arabia providing assurances and arranging at least one crude shipment to bypass the closed strait. Saudi authorities also diverted some of their own crude exports via Yanbu to reduce the impact.

On 3 March, Iraq started shutting down operations at the Rumaila oil field due to a lack of storage space, as tankers were unable to leave the strait. On 6 March, Qatari energy minister Saad Sherida al-Kaabi warned that if the war continues, other Gulf energy producers may be forced to halt exports and declare force majeure, and that "this will bring down economies of the world". QatarEnergy had already stopped gas production on 2 March and declared force majeure on gas contracts on 4 March. On 7 March, the Kuwait Petroleum Corporation declared force majeure and announced that it would be cutting its oil production. Bahrain's Bapco Energies declared force majeure and the United Arab Emirates lowered its oil production. As of 8 March, production at the three main oil fields in southern Iraq had dropped by 70% since the start of the war, from 4.3 million barrels per day to 1.3 million. As of 12 March the Gulf Arab states cut their production by at least 10 million barrels per day. On 13 March, Saudi Arabia reduced its oil production by 20%, from 10 million barrels per day to 8 million, after the shutdown of two of Saudi Aramco's offshore fields, including Safaniya. The missing oil is mostly medium and heavy grades, which some Asian refineries depend on and cannot easily switch to lighter grades. Oil exports from the region were 25 million barrels per day before the war, dropping 60% to around 10 million by 15 March. Iraq declared force majeure on "all oilfields developed by foreign oil companies" on 17 March.

Oil delivery shipping lines and approximate delivery time from the Strait of Hormuz

On 8 March, crude oil prices surpassed US$100 per barrel for the first time in four years, since the 2022 Russian invasion of Ukraine, and reached a high of $126. The price surge was faster than during any other conflict in recent history, such as the Ukraine war, the Gulf War, or the Iraq War. On 11 March, the 32 International Energy Agency member states unanimously agreed to release 400 million barrels of oil, representing about four days worth of global consumption, from their emergency reserves. The US enacted a suspension of the embargo of Russian oil during the Russo-Ukrainian war until 11 April for 30 Russia-connected petroleum tankers in Asia, carrying 19 million barrels of oil. The crisis has also led to a slight increase in the number of ships traversing the Panama Canal. In the second week of March, California's gasoline prices exceeded $5 per gallon due to the United States' conflict with Iran. On 19 March, Dubai crude oil prices reached US$166, their highest on record. On 23 March, in response to President Trump's comments on US–Iranian negotiations, Brent crude prices fell from US$114 to US$102 per barrel. On 27 March, Brent crude increased to US$114 per barrel, after negotiations did not produce a ceasefire and the IRGC declared the strait to be closed. The largest ever monthly increase of oil prices occurred in March 2026.

An analysis performed by The New York Times, comparing the quantities and value of oil and other fuels shipped between the start of the war and 8 May 2026, and those from the same period a year earlier showed that the biggest beneficiaries of the market changes were the United States (which saw an increase in exports and a revenue increase of about $50 billion) and Russia (which had steady exports and an increase of more than $15 billion in revenue), while other major non-Persian Gulf exporters also benefitted to lesser degrees. All Persian Gulf nations showed declines in exports of oil and other fuels, though those nations that were able to avoid shipping bottlenecks through the Strait of Hormuz (Saudi Arabia through pipelines to the Red Sea, and Oman via geography) saw increases in revenue, while those that could not avoid the strait (Iraq, Kuwait, Qatar and the United Arab Emirates) saw declines in revenue. Iran, which had access to the strait, had an increase in revenues.

Later, as fear calmed, brent prices fell from a pick of $118.35 in March 31, 2026 to $71.57 in July 1, 2026. On July the brent price increased to $100.69 in July 23, but in July 24, despite growing tension, the brent price closed at $96.78. In addition, oil shipping index which picked to 3,737 in March 2026 has declined to 1,850 in July 2026. Indeed, Goldman Sachs published that the Iran war does not a broad drive supply chain crisis.

On March, the OECD forecasts that due to the war, the inflation in the US will be 4.2% in 2026, higher by 1.2% than previous predictions. Similar prediction were issued by the US Federal Reserve. Nevertheless, a 2026 Dallas Federal Reserve working paper projected, using DSGE model, a 0.6 percentage point rise in US headline inflation under one-quarter closure of the strait of Hormoz, while the longer-term inflation is projected to barley move. As of June 2026, the June 2025 - June 2026 inflation rate is 3.53%, the consumer price index decreased by 0.42% since May 2026, while the weekly earnings increased by 0.77% in the same period.

The war increase the concern of recession, however, some economists have argued that modern economies are less vulnerable to oil shocks that in the 1970s. A similar pattern has been found using geopolitical risk indices more broadly. On July, the IMF revised its world GDP growth rate to 3% for 2026 and 3.4% in 2027. The forecasted growth rate is higher than the actual growth rates in 2023-2025. According to IMF the effect of the oil supply shock on the world economy is limited due to the AI-driven demand which offsets the negative effect of the oil supply shock. According to the WSJ July 2026 survey of 74 economists, the consensus remains that the U.S. economy will avoid a recession. Indeed, since the S&P 500 hit 6,316.91 points on March 30, 2026 it increased by 17.3% closing at 7,411.98 points on July 24, 2026.

==== European energy market impact ====
The crisis contributed to increased European imports of Russian liquefied natural gas (LNG), particularly from the Yamal LNG project in the Russian Arctic. According to shipping data analysed by the environmental organisation Urgewald and reported by The Independent, between January and April 2026, the European Union imported a £3bn record volume of Yamal LNG amid concerns over disruptions to Middle Eastern energy routes during the crisis. According to a Kpler shipping data analysis published by EUobserver, the European Union received 91 cargoes from the Yamal LNG project during this same period, accounting for approximately 98% of the facility's exports during that period.

Analysts noted that tensions surrounding the Strait of Hormuz renewed concerns over European energy security and highlighted the bloc's continuing dependence on Russian LNG despite efforts to reduce imports following the Russian invasion of Ukraine.

The financial toll of the Strait of Hormuz crisis on European Union member states has been severe. By the first week of May 2026, EU Energy Commissioner Dan Jørgensen reported that member states had collectively incurred more than €30 billion (over $35 billion) in additional costs for fossil fuel imports-without any corresponding increase in the volume of energy received. He described the situation as "arguably the most severe supply crisis ever" to affect the bloc. Just days earlier, in late April, European Commission president Ursula von der Leyen had estimated that the ongoing conflict was costing the EU nearly €500 million per day, underscoring the acute financial pressure facing the union.

In its September 2026 report, the International Energy Agency noted that U.S. diesel and gasoil prices rose above $200 per barrel in early September, marking a 94% increase over pre-war levels.

In October 2026, disruptions to liquefied natural gas (LNG) supplies related to the conflict in the Middle East continued to impact European gas markets. The European Union Agency for the Cooperation of Energy Regulators (ACER) estimated that the conflict increased the EU's gas import bill by €18–33 billion during the summer of 2026, depending on the pricing benchmark used. On 28 October, the Dutch Title Transfer Facility (TTF) front-month natural gas futures contract briefly reached €100 per megawatt-hour, approximately three times its pre-war level, according to Reuters.

==== Industry ====
The US defense industry is affected by "near total" disruption of critical minerals supply, in particular sulfur, through the strait. In face of sulfuric acid scarcity, China has banned exports impacting among other things copper production in Chile which imported sulfuric acid as consumable. Aluminum prices experienced a slight increase, as the Gulf states account of 20% of raw aluminum exports and 8% of aluminum production. Roughly one-third of the world's helium production is impacted by the crisis, due to both the disruption of LNG production in Qatar and the very time-sensitive nature of helium transportation. Helium distributors are rationing deliveries as of early April.

The Gulf region also produces nearly half of the world's urea and 30% of ammonia, with about one-third of the world's fertilizer passing through the strait. Urea prices increased by 50% since the start of the war, as of late March 2026, while other fertilizer prices, such as diammonium phosphate, also rose. The LNG disruption is also a problem for the production of fertilizer, impacting the agriculture industry in the Northern Hemisphere. The price shock and the shortage of fertilizer during the spring planting season could reduce the planting and yields of corn in the US—the main feed stock for US beef, poultry, and dairy—and potentially increase global food prices into 2027. Unlike oil, the fertilizer sector does not have internationally coordinated strategic reserves, making supply disruptions more difficult to manage. It is estimated that global fertilizer prices could average 15–20% higher during the first half of 2026 if the crisis continues. Moreover, some economists have argued that modern economies are less vulnerable to oil shocks that in the 1970s, citing lower oil intensity, more flexible labor markets, and more credible monetary policy. A similar pattern has been found using geopolitical risk indices more broadly. On July, the IMF revised its world GDP growth rate to 3% for 2026 and 3.4% in 2027. The forecasted growth rate is higher than the actual growth rates in 2023-2025. According to IMF the effect of the oil supply shock on the world economy is limited since the AI-driven demand offsets the negative effect of the oil supply shock. Moreover, according to the WSJ July 2026 survey of 74 economists, the consensus remains that the U.S. economy will avoid a recession, with the average probability of a downturn over the next year falling to 25% from 33% in the previous survey.

As the crisis passed 150 days in early August 2026, the freight industry was plagued with only partially paid agreements.

Container traffic was affected as sharply as oil and gas. Jebel Ali in Dubai, the largest container port in the Middle East, handled 374,000 TEU in the second quarter of 2026, a fall of 90.1% year on year, and 3.1 million TEU over the first half of the year, down 59.5%. Its operator, DP World, reported group throughput of 42.8 million TEU for the half, a decline of 5.7%, but said volumes excluding Jebel Ali rose 6.5% on a like-for-like basis. Tracked transits through the strait fell from about 90 a day before the war to a handful, and berths at Jebel Ali that normally worked more than 80 scheduled services a week were left idle. DP World continued to spend about $100 million a month, its pre-war operating cost, so that the port could return to full capacity within 48 hours if normal shipping resumed, and began building two terminals at Fujairah, outside the strait; cargo rerouted overland from Fujairah or Khor Fakkan cost roughly four to five times more than shipping through Hormuz. The port and its adjoining free zone account for about a third of Dubai's GDP.

In Cairo's Manshiyet Nasser district, around 120,000 residents recycle a third of the city's waste daily. Because of geopolitical tensions, Egyptian factories now rely on this community, which recycles up to 90 percent of plastic waste.

=== Food Security crisis ===
The head of the International Chamber of Commerce said a global food security crisis is emerging because the Middle East's Strait of Hormuz is closed. Since the disruption in the Strait of Hormuz began, the capacity to supply chemical fertilizers has dropped by 40 percent.

In May, Qu Dongyu, Director-General of the Food and Agriculture Organization of the United Nations (FAO), warned during "Rome Nutrition Week" that disruptions in the Strait of Hormuz could trigger a serious food security crisis. He stated that restrictions on transit through the Strait have affected the flow of sulfur and fertilizers, driving up the costs of agricultural inputs and exerting upward pressure on seed prices. Fertilizer-importing countries have also faced high costs.

According to the World Economic Forum, the crisis in the Strait of Hormuz impacts not only the energy sector but also food products. Factors such as diesel fuel for agricultural machinery, transportation costs for agricultural inputs and produce, and the natural gas and energy required to produce ammonia and urea—all of which rely on energy—impose constraints on the food industry.

On 5 October 2026, the International Chamber of Commerce (ICC) cautioned that grain prices in some regions could climb by as much as 80% should shipping restrictions through the Strait of Hormuz continue. According to ICC Secretary General John Denton, the core of the problem lies in the disruption of established mineral fertilizer supply chains. The situation has affected nearly 40% of the global fertilizer trade and has removed roughly 2.7 million metric tons of these products from the market. Countries such as the Philippines, which imports up to 90% of its fertilizer needs, were singled out as especially vulnerable.

=== International responses ===
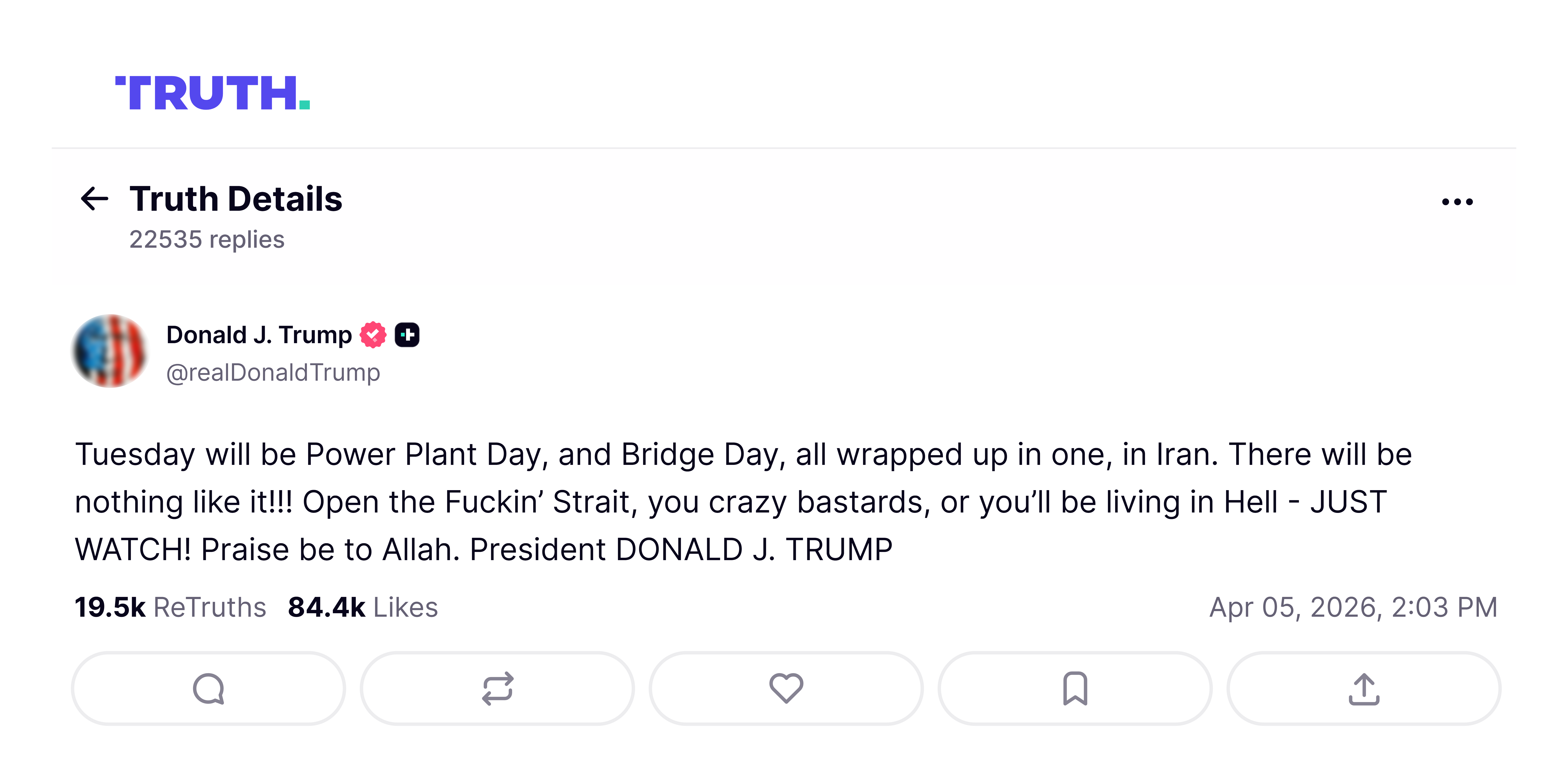
Truth Social post by Trump. In his statement, the president cursed at Iran and threatened them to open the Strait of Hormuz or face destruction of power plants and bridges.

On 3 March, US president Donald Trump said that the US Navy would begin to escort tankers through the strait "as soon as possible". On 22 March, Trump threatened to 'obliterate' Iranian power plants if they do not completely open the strait without 48 hours. In response, the Iranian defense council threatened to lay mines throughout the Persian Gulf. On 23 March, Trump postponed the ultimatum, citing "very good and productive conversations" with Iran. On 30 March, Trump threatened to strike Iranian energy infrastructure if they do not reopen the strait. On 31 March, Trump told countries that were having trouble getting fuel due to the closure to fend for themselves, saying that the US would not help them. On 4 April, Trump reasserted the ultimatum, giving Iran another 48 hours to open the strait or "face hell." Trump later extended the ultimatum by one day, until 7 April at 8:00 p.m. Eastern Time.

Iran denied having conducted any negotiations with Trump. The state-affiliated Tasnim News Agency insisted that the strait would not return to pre-war levels of travel, and it also suggested that the negotiations were an effort to sow discord within Iran. At the same time, the Iranian Foreign Ministry acknowledged that it was reviewing a proposal it received from the United States. According to an analysis in Iran International, Trump's statements succeeded in lowering oil prices while also "fracturing" the Iranian regime.

On 7 April, US ambassador to the United Nations Mike Waltz said that "no country gets to hold the world hostage for leverage just because they happen to sit next to a strait."

On 7 March, the Indian government proposed to deploy the Indian Navy to safeguard the oil supplies it receives. On 9 March, French president Emmanuel Macron announced that France and several other states are setting up a "purely defensive, purely support" escort mission for merchant ships transiting the strait, in the framework of Operation Aspides, and that France is sending a dozen ships to the wider Middle East. The French Navy vowed to send two frigates to escort vessels through the strait. As of 10 March, Britain, along with Germany and Italy, are working to support commercial shipping through the Strait of Hormuz. Also on that day, US chairman of the Joint Chiefs of Staff general Dan Caine said that the US military was looking at a "range of options" for restoring tanker traffic. In March 2026, the US sent the 31st Marine Expeditionary Unit to the region; The Wall Street Journal reported that the Marines could be used to help reopen the Strait of Hormuz.

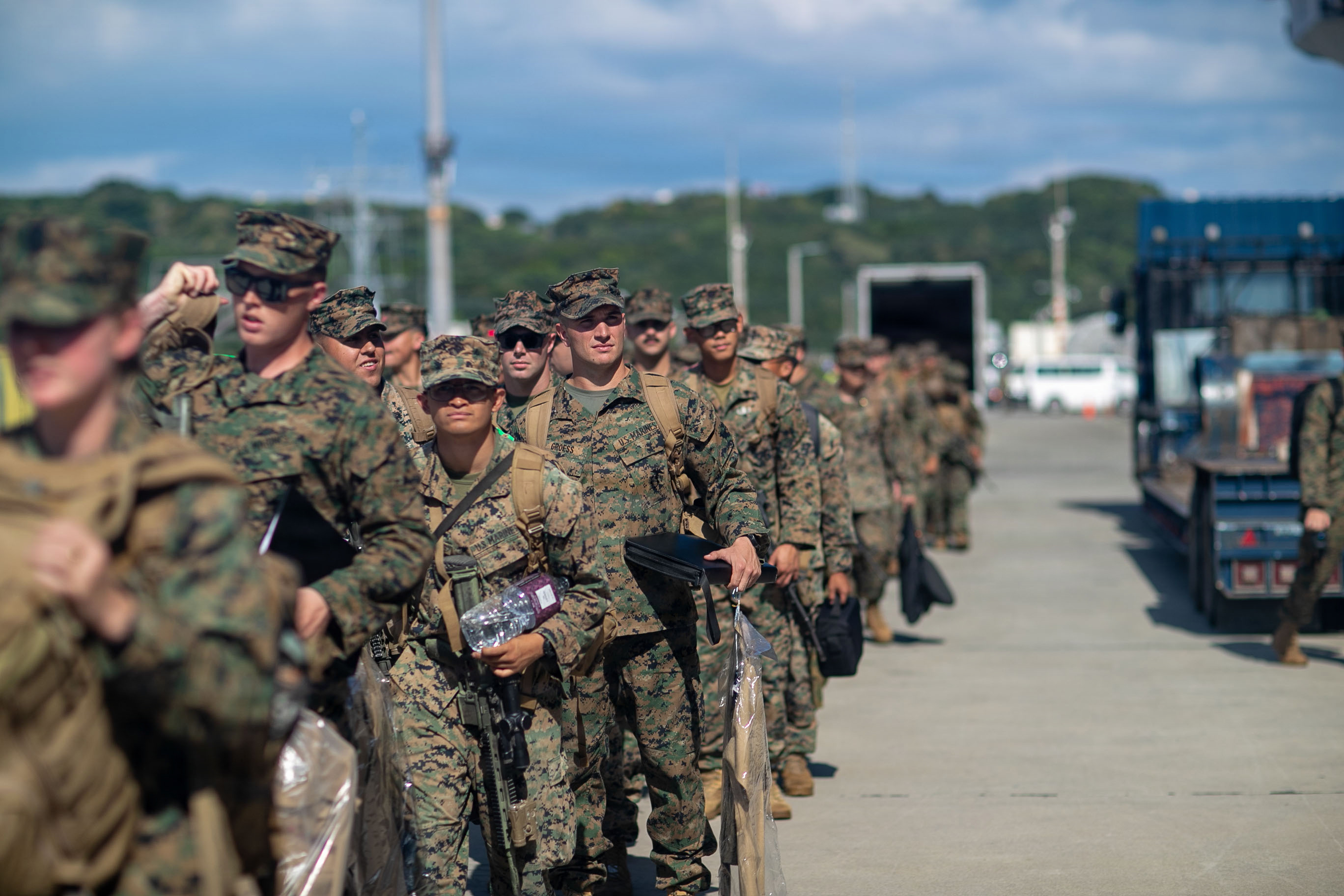
The 31st Marine Expeditionary Unit aboard USS Tripoli, deployed to the region in March 2026

On 11 March, the G7 nations agreed to look into the possibility of escorting ships through the strait. US energy secretary Chris Wright on 12 March said that the US Navy may be able to start escorting ships by the end of March, with the military still focused on "destroying Iran's offensive capabilities and the manufacturing industry that supplies their offensive capabilities." On 15 March, British energy secretary Ed Miliband said that the UK was considering "any options" to secure the strait. Later that day, British prime minister Keir Starmer held phone conversations with US president Donald Trump and Canadian prime minister Mark Carney to discuss opening the strait. British finance minister Rachel Reeves said that the lack of a plan for opening the strait was "frustrating."

On 15 March, Trump demanded that NATO members and China help the US reopen the strait. An Australian government minister stated on 16 March that Australia would not send ships to the strait. On the same day, Japan's prime minister Sanae Takaichi also ruled out the possibility of sending Japanese navy ships to escort oil tankers. European Union foreign policy chief Kaja Kallas said that the EU was exploring the possibility of expanding the scope of its existing naval missions, Aspides and Atalanta, or establishing a framework for the strait similar to the Black Sea Grain Initiative. She called for a diplomatic solution to the crisis. Several EU members ruled out military involvement in the crisis: Germany, Italy, Luxembourg, Romania, Spain, and the United Kingdom. France emphasized that a naval escort mission would only take place when the war is over, with French officials saying that Greece, Italy and the Netherlands have shown interest in such a mission. Also on 16 March, US treasury secretary Scott Bessent said that for now the United States is happy with the increasing number of ships transiting the strait.

On 17 March, the Iraqi oil minister said that they are in contact with Iran to negotiate allowing ships to pass. On 19 March, France, Germany, Italy, the Netherlands, the United Kingdom, and Japan announced in a joint statement that they are ready to participate in efforts to reopen the strait. On the same day, a meeting of EU leaders failed to reach an agreement on the subject, with a lack of support for expanding the European Union Naval Force in the Red Sea to cover the strait. The joint statement on securing the strait was joined by other countries by 21 March, including: the UAE, Bahrain, Canada, South Korea, New Zealand, Denmark, Latvia, Slovenia, Estonia, Norway, Sweden, Finland, Czech Republic, Romania, Lithuania, and Australia.

On 21 March, UN secretary-general António Guterres called for the strait to be opened, and suggested that the UN could help secure it. China stated that the war should not have started, and criticised Iran for attacking other countries in the area. On 29 March, Pakistan hosted a meeting with Egypt, Saudi Arabia, and Turkey, to discuss reopening the Strait of Hormuz. On 30 March, Scott Bessent said that the US would gradually "take control" over the strait.

On 30 March, President Volodymyr Zelenskyy offered Ukraine's expertise to unblock the strait. Ukraine has managed to keep its ports open by creating a safe corridor through the Black Sea despite constant Russian attacks. Ukrainian strategy includes sharing insurance costs with providers as well as using a combination of armed surface drones, coastal artillery, and air force to repel Russian attacks. On 5 April, French president Emmanuel Macron and South Korean president Lee Jae Myung agreed to work together towards opening the Strait of Hormuz. Also on 5 April, the UAE said that it would support a US military operation to take control of the strait.

On 4 April, the vote on Bahrain's proposal at the UN Security Council calling on states to ensure safety in the strait is uncertain because of divisions among major powers. While many countries support keeping the Strait of Hormuz open for global shipping, countries like Russia and China are concerned the resolution could justify military action near Iran and risk escalation, even though Bahrain had already weakened the proposal by removing stronger language that allowed force. The disagreement remains as Russia and China have veto power. On 7 April, Russia and China vetoed Bahrain's proposal, saying that it was biased against Iran and that it was the wrong message to send after the US president's recent statement threatening the survival of a civilization. Their decision was praised by the Iranian ambassador, and condemned by the US and French ambassadors.

On 9 April, UK Foreign Secretary Yvette Cooper rejected the idea that Iran could charge tolls to ships transiting the strait. On 10 April, prime minister Keir Starmer said that he and president Trump discussed assembling a political and diplomatic coalition for reopening the Strait of Hormuz on a phone call the previous day, and that they also spoke about military options.

On 12 April, a UK government spokesperson said that the UK is working with France and others to ensure that ships can pass through the strait. The next day, French president Emmanuel Macron said that he was organizing a conference with the British to discuss a strategy. On 14 April, Macron and British prime minister Keir Starmer announced that they are holding an online meeting on 17 April for countries interested in a "defensive multilateral mission". On 13 April, admiral Mark Hammond said that the Australian navy is ready to open the strait if the government decides that they should do so. On 16 April, Canada condemned Iran's attacks and said that it is important to keep the Strait of Hormuz open. While the efforts by the U.S. were occurring to reopen the waterway, China moved to block the Scarborough Shoal in the South China Sea. On 21 April, during a call with Saudi Crown Prince Mohammed bin Salman, Chinese leader Xi Jinping said "The Strait of Hormuz should remain open to normal navigation, which is in the common interest of regional countries and the international community". On 22–23 April, the United Kingdom hosted a conference of 50 countries intended to develop a plan for reopening the strait.

In May 2026, the United Kingdom announced the deployment of drones, fighter aircraft and a Royal Navy warship to participate in an international defensive mission aimed at securing commercial shipping through the strait. British officials stated that the deployment was intended to protect maritime traffic and maintain freedom of navigation, amid growing regional instability and disruptions to global energy transit routes.

The deployment followed statements by the Islamic Revolutionary Guard Corps Navy redefining the Strait of Hormuz as a broader Iranian "operational area", as well as increasing international concerns over the security of Gulf shipping lanes during the crisis.

On 28 May, Donald Trump rejected reports that Iran and Oman could share oversight of shipping through the Strait of Hormuz. In response to a question about a possible arrangement between the two countries, Trump stated that "nobody" would control the strait and said that Oman would "behave just like everybody else or we'll have to blow them up". U.S. treasury secretary Scott Bessent also warned that Washington would "aggressively" sanction Oman if it facilitated an Iranian transit-fee system.

Iran subsequently condemned the U.S. statements regarding Oman. Iranian foreign ministry spokesman Esmaeil Baghaei described them as an attempt to "blackmail" an independent UN member state and stated that sanctions against Oman would be illegal and contrary to the UN Charter and international law. The New York Times reported that in June 2026 Oman formally proposed to the United States and other countries a plan where shipping companies could pay service fees to use the strait.

== International law ==
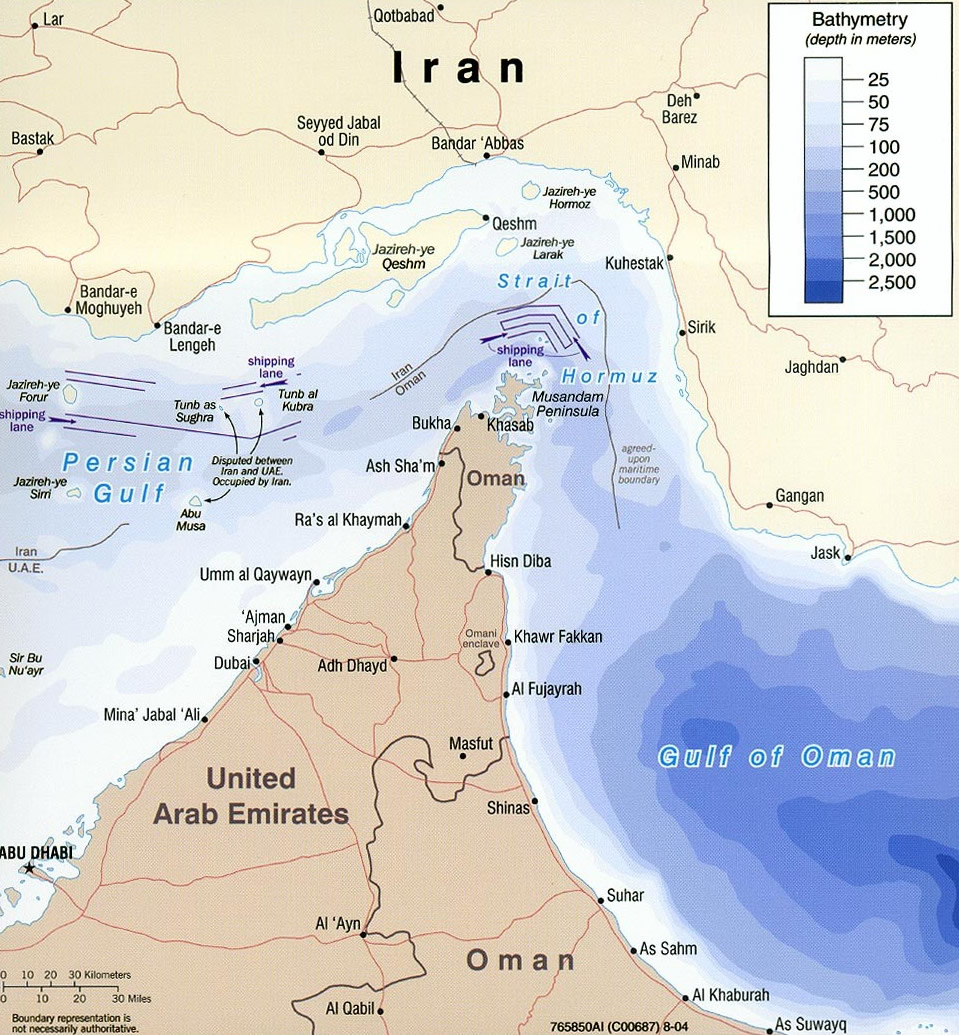
International political boundaries in the Strait of Hormuz (2004)

The closure of the Strait of Hormuz is, according to some analysts, a violation of international law. According to Majid Rafizadeh, Iran is violating the United Nations Convention on the Law of the Sea (UNCLOS), which Iran has signed but has not ratified, meaning that the treaty does not apply to Iran under international law. The placement of sea mines in the strait by Iran is seen by Just Security as a violation of the law of the sea, violating the Hague VIII conventional.

The UNCLOS regime of innocent passage through territorial waters prohibits imposing a fee on passing ships, unless they receive specific services. However, UNCLOS also says that "every State has the right to establish the breadth of its territorial sea up to a limit not exceeding 12 nautical miles."

=== 2026 Iranian redefinition of the strait ===
In May 2026, the Islamic Revolutionary Guard Corps Navy announced that Iran had redefined the Strait of Hormuz into what officials described as a "vast operational area". According to IRGC official Mohammad Akbarzadeh, the strait was no longer viewed as the narrow maritime corridor surrounding the islands of Hormuz and Hengam, rather as a broader strategic zone extending from the Iranian port city of Jask to Sirik Island.

== Scrapped opening of the strait ==
On 17 April, Iran's foreign minister Abbas Araghchi announced that the Strait of Hormuz was open to all shipping traffic. Iran said that the strait would remain open for the duration of the ceasefire in Lebanon. Following the announcement, oil prices dropped sharply. Although the strait has been declared to be open, commercial traffic is unlikely to return to pre-war levels immediately after the ceasefire. Shortly after this announcement, president Trump made a Truth Social post, saying that the strait is completely open, but that the US naval blockade will remain until negotiations with Iran have concluded. On 18 April, Iran said that it closed the Strait of Hormuz again in response to the refusal of the US to lift its naval blockade.

== Islands near the Strait of Hormuz ==
- Qeshm
- Hormuz
- Hengam
- Larak
- Sirri Island
- Faror Island
- Abu Musa (Administered by Iran, claimed by Iran and the United Arab Emirates)
- Greater and Lesser Tunbs (Administered by Iran, claimed by Iran and the United Arab Emirates)
- As Salamah Archipelago (claimed by Oman)
- Umm al-Fayyarin (claimed by Oman)

== See also ==
- Closure of the Suez Canal (1967–1975)
- Economic impact of the 2026 Iran war
- Elphinstone Inlet
- European Maritime Awareness in the Strait of Hormuz
- Red Sea crisis
- Tanker war
- American expansionism under Donald Trump
- Energy transition
- Trump Always Chickens Out
- Timeline of the 2026 Iran war
- Misinformation during the 2026 Iran war
- 2025–2026 Russian fuel crisis

== Sources ==
This article incorporates text from a free content work. Licensed under CC BY 4.0 (license statement/permission). Text taken from Global Agrifood Implications of the 2026 Conflict in the Middle East, Impacts on energy and fertilizer trade, and food security. Food and Agriculture Organization of the United Nations.
