= 2026 Strait of Hormuz campaign =

2026 Iran war aerial campaign

- Part of the 2026 Iran War and the 2026 Strait of Hormuz crisis
- Type: Airstrikes
- Location: Strait of Hormuz
- Planned by: United States
- Target: Iranian naval vessels and drones
- Date: 19 March 2026 – present
- Executed by: United States Air Force; United States Navy; Israeli Air Force
- Outcome: Memorandum: Naval blockade of Iran from 13 April 2026; Operation Project Freedom from 4 to 6 May 2026 (temporary halt); July 2026 United States strikes against Iran

On 19 March 2026, the United States began an aerial campaign against Iranian targets to reopen the Strait of Hormuz following its closure by Iran in response to the attacks by the United States and Israel. The operation was announced as part of a plan to reopen the passage to international shipping by destroying Iranian naval vessels and drones targeting shipping in the strait. Israel assassinated Alireza Tangsiri, the naval officer overseeing the blockade of the Strait of Hormuz.

On 13 April 2026, the United States imposed a naval blockade on Iran following the failure of the Islamabad Talks during the ceasefire. On 23 April, President Trump ordered the U.S. Navy to destroy any Iranian boats laying mines in the Hormuz. On 3 May, Trump said that the U.S. will help free up ships in the Strait of Hormuz beginning the next morning. On 6 May, President Trump announced a temporary pause in the U.S. military's "Project Freedom" operation to reopen the Strait of Hormuz, indicating "great progress" toward a possible agreement with Iran. The operation will be delayed briefly to assess the potential for a "complete and final agreement" with Iran.

On 17 June, Trump and Iranian President Masoud Pezeshkian signed the memorandum of understanding to end the war, with Trump signing it during dinner with French President Emmanuel Macron at the Palace of Versailles following the G7 summit. On 18 June, primary mediator Pakistan announced that the US-Iran memorandum of understanding aimed at ending the war implies Tehran will promptly reopen the Hormuz Strait and that the American blockade of Iranian ports will cease immediately.

On 8 July, the interim ceasefire deal between the US and Iran collapsed after Iran allegedly struck multiple commercial ships in the Strait of Hormuz and the US responded by striking Iranian territory, followed by Iranian strikes on US bases in the Gulf States. On 14 July, the US reinstated the naval blockade.

On 25 August, US officials confirmed Trump's claim that the US Navy cleared mines from the Strait of Hormuz Traffic Separation Scheme, adding that over recent months, underwater drones identified over 100 suspected mines and private contractors dealt with them. Trump stated that the US will destroy Iranian vessels laying additional mines in the Strait of Hormuz.

== Background ==
The Iran war began on 28 February 2026 after the United States and Israel conducted airstrikes on various Iranian military targets, which included the assassination of Ali Khamenei, the Supreme Leader of Iran. In response, Iran closed the Strait of Hormuz to all foreign shipping. The Islamic Revolutionary Guard Corps (IRGC) transmitted warnings via VHF radio to vessels in the Straits, stating that "no ship is allowed to pass the Strait of Hormuz." The British Royal Navy said that the closure was not legally binding though safety cannot be guaranteed, so several ships stayed in port or turned back.

On 2 March 2026, the IRGC officially confirmed that the strait was closed to "unfriendly nations", allowing only Iran-approved vessels to pass. On 4 March, the IRGC said that the Islamic Republic of Iran Navy had achieved "complete control" of the strait. Several Iran-approved ships have passed the strait during the conflict, mostly petroleum ships bound for China and India, some with military escort. Iran also threatened to set fire to any other ship that passed through it. In response to the closure, United States President Donald Trump said that 12 March the U.S. Navy would begin escorting oil tankers through the strait "as soon as possible."

== Prelude ==
On 15 March 2026, Donald Trump called on "countries of the world that receive oil through the Hormuz Strait" to "take care of that passage" militarily. The following day, several U.S.-aligned NATO countries rejected Trump's request, including Germany, Spain, Italy, Estonia, the United Kingdom, Australia, South Korea, and Japan, as well as the European Union. The various nations declined, citing the lack of strategic goals or reluctance to get drawn into the war. German Defense Minister Boris Pistorius said "this is not our war, we have not started it." Trump rebuked his NATO allies, calling their decision a "very foolish mistake" and said that the United States does "not need the help of anyone" in the war. On 19 March, 5 large European nations and Japan issued a statement to secure the strait after "first establishing a truce and building a multilateral naval coalition". Trump later lambasted NATO, calling them "cowards," stating that "without the U.S.A., NATO is a paper tiger."

On 18 March, the United Arab Emirates declared its willingness to join a U.S.-led military effort to secure the Strait of Hormuz.

== Campaign ==
On 17 March, United States Central Command (CENTCOM) announced that it had employed multiple GBU-72 5,000-pound penetrator munitions on underground missile silos along the Iranian coast near the strait. The munitions penetrated layers of rock and concrete to destroy underground bunkers which stored Iran's many cruise missiles and unused anti-ship missiles.

On 19 March, General Dan Caine announced that the U.S. was deploying A-10 Thunderbolt II jets to strike "fast-attack watercraft" and Boeing AH-64 Apache gunships to "handle one-way attack drones" in an attempt to open the Strait of Hormuz. CENTCOM subsequently published footage showing U.S. strikes "destroying Iranian naval assets that threaten international shipping in and near the Strait of Hormuz." That same day, France, Germany, Italy, Japan, Netherlands and United Kingdom declared their support to contribute in the efforts to open the Strait of Hormuz, as did the European Union.

On 20 March, Iran said that 16 commercial boats in the port of Bandar Lengeh "were completely burned" by U.S.–Israeli strikes. Trump announced that "The Hormuz Strait will have to be guarded and policed, as necessary, by other Nations who use it — The United States does not! If asked, we will help these countries in their Hormuz efforts, but it shouldn’t be necessary once Iran’s threat is eradicated." Officials said that the U.S. military is dispatching 2,500 additional Marines to the Middle East, who are trained to conduct amphibious landings. It has been speculated that the Marines could be used to militarily seize Kharg Island, an important island in the Persian Gulf, which the U.S. Air Force had bombed earlier in the war while leaving most of the oil infrastructure on the island intact.

A total of 22 countries, including the United Kingdom, France, Germany, Japan, Bahrain, and the United Arab Emirates, signed a statement declaring their willingness to "contribute to appropriate efforts to ensure safe passage" in the Strait of Hormuz, and that preparations were underway.

On 21 March, President Trump issued an ultimatum to Iran, demanding it to "fully open, without threat" the Strait of Hormuz within 48 hours, threatening to otherwise strike Iranian power plants, "with the biggest one first." In response, Iran doubled down, threatening to "completely" close the Strait of Hormuz and strike vital infrastructure across the region such as energy and desalination facilities critical for drinking water. Iranian opposition figure Reza Pahlavi called on Trump and Netanyahu "to continue targeting the regime and its apparatus of repression, while sparing the civilian infrastructure Iranians will need to rebuild our country."

On 26 March, Israel killed Iran's top naval commander, Alireza Tangsiri, portraying the killing as part of an effort to support the U.S.'s push to reopen the Strait of Hormuz. According to Israeli defense minister Israel Katz, Tangsiri was overseeing the blockade of the Strait of Hormuz and was "directly responsible for the terrorist act of bombing and blocking the Strait of Hormuz." U.S. Admiral Brad Cooper said the assassination "makes the region safer." Tangsiri's killing was confirmed by Iranian authorities.

On 27 March, Iran remained firm in asserting its control over the Strait of Hormuz. The same day, it reported that Iran had successfully blocked two Chinese ships which were attempting to enter the Strait of Hormuz.

On 1 April, airstrikes targeting the strategically important Hengam Island in the Strait of Hormuz caused seven injuries, including one critically. According to a provincial official, the strikes hit civilian sites.

On 2 April, Bahrain called on the United Nations Security Council to support its resolution authorizing military force and "all necessary means" to open the Strait of Hormuz. Russia, China, and France have expressed their opposition to such measure. The resolution was vetoed by Russia and China on 7 April as it placed all the blame on Iran, effectively blocking UN authorization of military force to open the Strait of Hormuz.

On 11 April, Trump said that American forces has started "clearing" the strait. Iran stated that an American vessel on way to the strait turned backed after warning. The Wall Street Journal reported that several U.S. Navy destroyers entered the Strait of Hormuz for the first time since the war began. A U.S. official described the event as an "operation that focused on freedom of navigation through International waters”. Iranian government reportedly threatened to attack the ships, accusing U.S. of ceasefire violation. U.S. Central Command said the ships are taking part in mine clearance operations.

On April 12, JD Vance announced that the talks between the U.S. and Iran had failed, as he was unable to reach an agreement after a day of negotiations. Afterwards, Trump declared a naval blockade on the Strait of Hormuz, announcing that the U.S. Navy will prevent ships from entering or exiting the Strait and intercept vessels that have paid tolls to Iran. CENTCOM announced that the blockade will be enforced on vessels of all nations entering or departing Iranian ports and coastal areas but "will not impede freedom of navigation for vessels transiting the Strait of Hormuz to and from non-Iranian ports." The IRGC Navy said that any military vessel approaching the strait would be considered a ceasefire violation and would meet a "severe response." On 14 April, a U.S. Navy destroyer forced two oil tankers trying to leave Iran to return. On 15 April, Admiral Brad Cooper said that the U.S. had implemented a full blockade of all of Iran's ports.

On 23 April, Trump ordered the U.S. Navy to destroy any Iranian boats laying mines in the Hormuz.

On 3 May, Trump said that the U.S. will help free up ships in the Strait of Hormuz beginning the next morning.

On 4 May, the Iranian military warned the U.S. to keep out of Hormuz.

On 6 May, President Trump announced a temporary halt in the U.S. military's "Project Freedom" operation to reopen the Strait of Hormuz, citing "great progress" toward a potential agreement with Iran. Trump stated that the operation will be paused for "a short period" to determine whether a "complete and final agreement" with Iran could be achieved.

On 17 June, Trump and Iranian President Masoud Pezeshkian signed the memorandum of understanding to end the war, with Trump signing the document during dinner with French President Emmanuel Macron at the Palace of Versailles after the G7 summit.

On 18 June, primary mediator Pakistan stated that the signing of the US-Iran memorandum of understanding to end the war implies Tehran will reopen the Hormuz "instantly" and the American blockade of Iranian ports will end "immediately."

On 8 July, the US-Iran interim truce agreement broke down after Iran allegedly struck multiple commercial ships in the Strait of Hormuz and the US responded by striking Iranian territory, followed by Iranian strikes on US bases in the Gulf States.

On 15 July, CENTCOM said that the US reinstated the naval blockade on Iran the day before.

On 25 August, US officials with firsthand knowledge corroborated Trump's assertion that the US Navy had cleared mines from the Hormuz Traffic Separation Scheme, Oman's primary maritime corridor with Iran, adding that over the last few months, underwater drones carried out a systematic scanning of the area, identifying over 100 objects suspected of having mines, which were then removed or detonated by private contractors. Trump added that the US will destroy Iranian vessels laying more mines in the Hormuz. On September 27th, Iran claimed to have captured a REMUS 600 in the Strait.

== Reactions ==
On 21 March, the Houthis in Yemen warned that it would respond to any escalation against Iran, including efforts to reopen the Strait of Hormuz. It specifically warned the two Arab countries offering to join the Strait of Hormuz campaign—Bahrain and the UAE—that they "will be the first to lose in this battle."

According to one report, Iran is considering temporarily suspending shipments through the Strait of Hormuz to avoid confrontation with the U.S.

== Analysis ==
Re-opening of the Strait of Hormuz is considered not to be feasible with military means, especially after U.S. failure to form a coalition with its allies or with the affected Asian countries.

The International Maritime Organization (IMO) confirmed 46 attacks on ships, as June 11, resulting in 14 deaths of innocent seafarers, with attacks continued during the April 8, 2026 declared ceasefire. The IMO reported that an estimated 1,000 ships and 20,000 crew remained stranded in the Arabian Gulf at that date, then exceeding 100 days.

== See also ==
- Tanker war
- 2026 Kharg Island attack
- 2026 Strait of Hormuz crisis
- 2026 Iran war
- 2026 Iran war ceasefire
- Economic impact of the 2026 Iran war
- European Maritime Awareness in the Strait of Hormuz
