= Panama Canal Authority =

Group managing the Panama Canal

Coordinates: 8°57′35.50″N 79°33′18″W

- Autoridad del Canal de Panamá

Agency overview
- Formed: 11 June 1997; 28 years ago
- Website: www.pancanal.com

The Panama Canal Authority (Spanish: Autoridad del Canal de Panamá; ACP) is the agency of the government of Panama responsible for the operation and management of the Panama Canal. The ACP took over the administration of the canal from the Panama Canal Commission, the joint US–Panama agency that managed the canal, on December 31, 1999, when the canal was handed over from the United States to Panama as per the Torrijos–Carter Treaties. It is headquartered in Balboa, a district of Panama City.

== Establishment ==
The Panama Canal Authority is established under Title XIV of the National Constitution, and has exclusive responsibility for the operation, administration, management, preservation, maintenance, and modernization of the canal. It is responsible for operating the canal safely, continuously, efficiently, and profitably.

The Organic Law of the Panama Canal Authority, passed on June 11, 1997, provides the legal framework for the canal's organization and operation.

== Organization ==
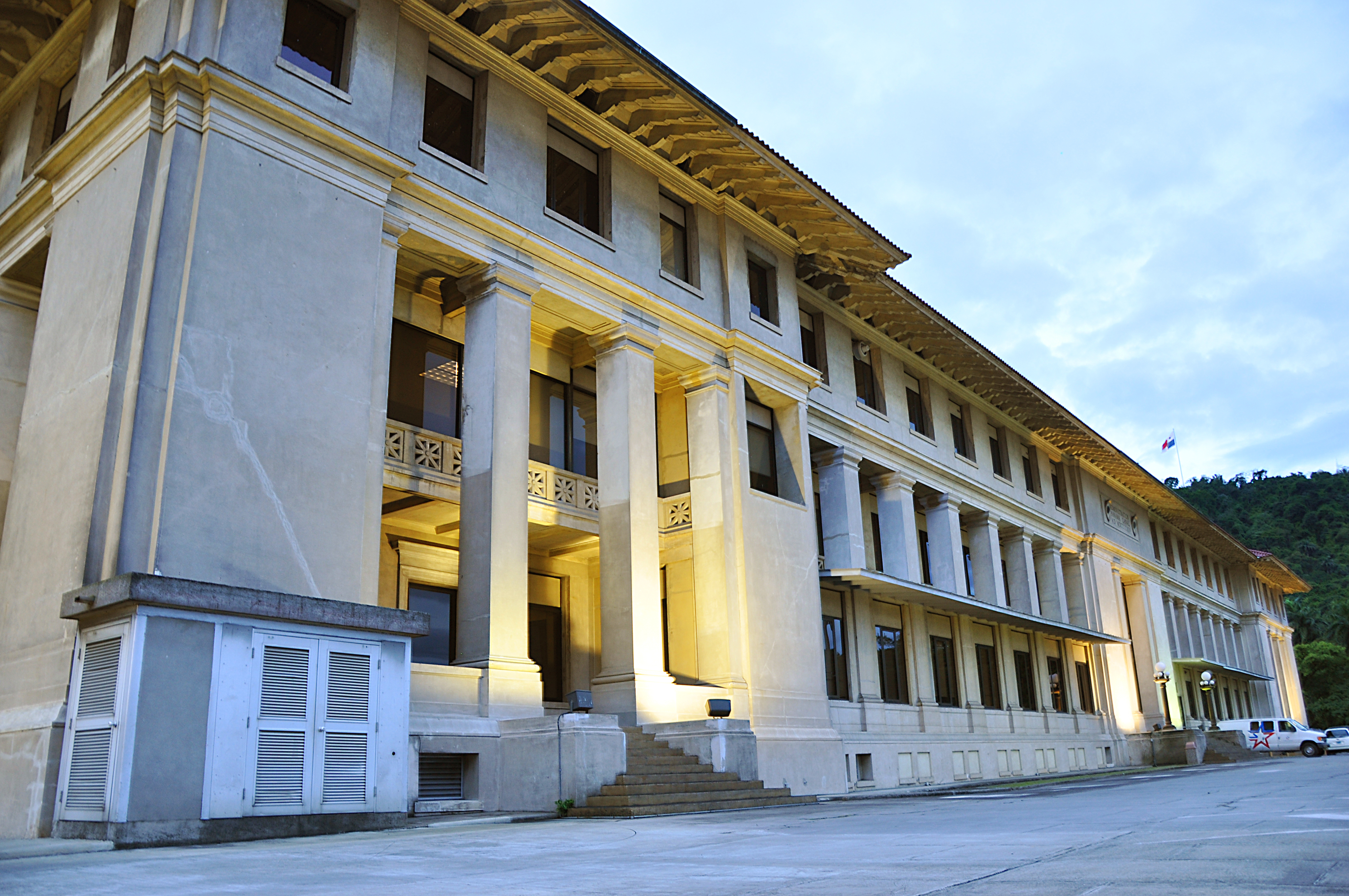
Panama Canal Administration building

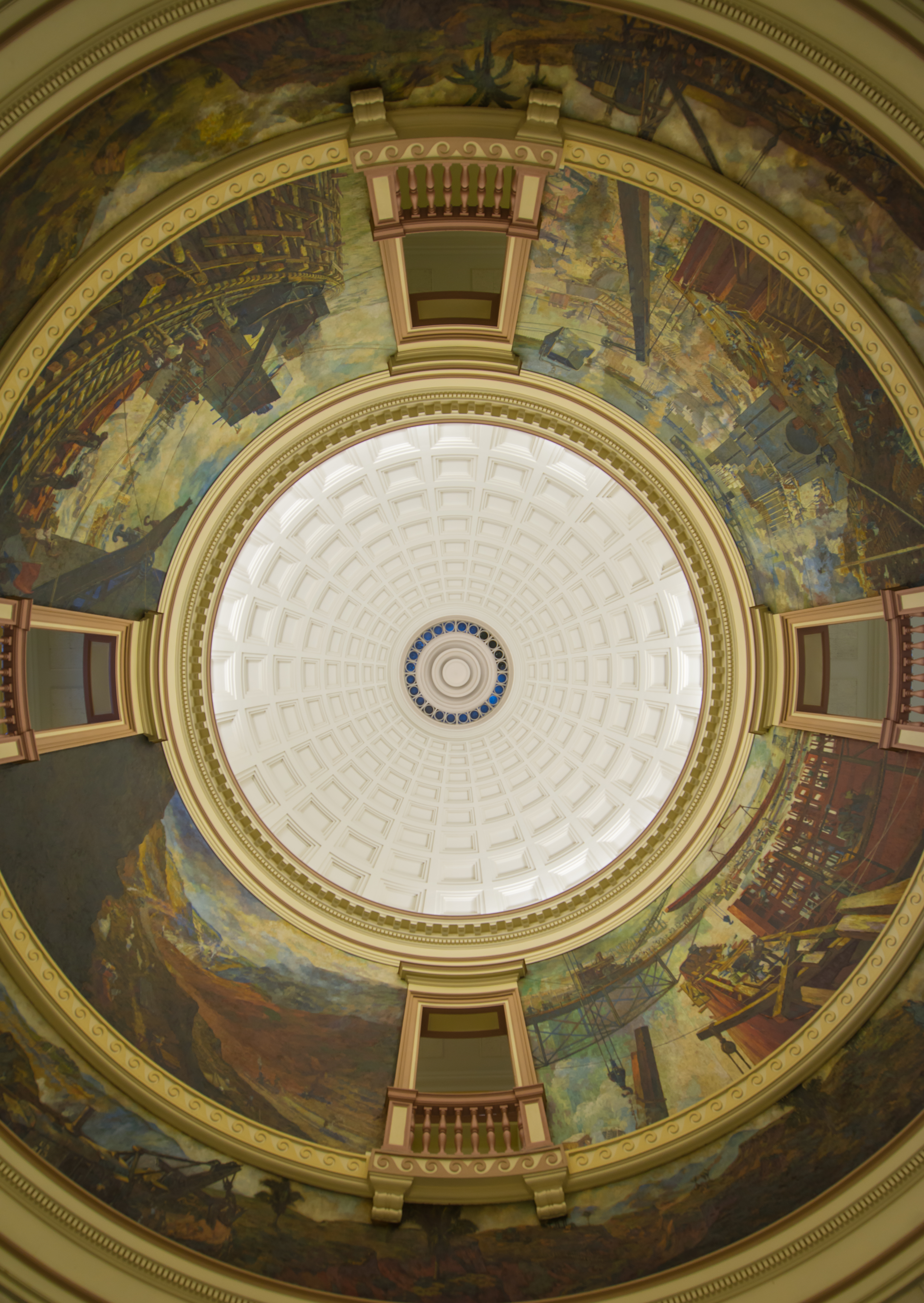
Interior of the Panama Canal administration building

Because of its unique nature, the ACP has financial autonomy and ownership of the canal's assets.

The Board of Directors is responsible for establishing policies for the operation, improvement, and modernization of the canal, as well as supervising its management pursuant to the National Constitution, the Panama Canal Authority Organic Law, and the regulations thereto appertaining.

The board of directors is composed as follows:

- One director designated by the president of the republic, who shall chair the Board of Directors and shall have the rank of Minister of State for Canal Affairs.
- One director designated by the legislative branch, who may be freely appointed or removed.
- Nine directors appointed by the president of the republic with the consent of the Cabinet Council and ratification by an absolute majority of the members of the Legislative Assembly.

The directors shall serve in their posts for a term of nine years and may be removed only for the reasons set forth in Article 20 of the Panama Canal Authority Organic Law.

The Panama Canal is defined by law as an inalienable patrimony of the Republic of Panama. Therefore, it may not be sold, assigned, mortgaged, or otherwise encumbered or transferred.

== Board of directors ==
The Panama Canal Authority Board of Directors is responsible for establishing policies for the operation, improvement, and modernization of the canal, as well as supervising its management.

At present, the Panama Canal Authority Board of Directors is made up of the following members:

- Jose Ramón Icaza Clément, Chairman of the Board
- Laury Anne Melo de Alfaro
- Ricardo Manuel Arango
- Dora María Perez Balladares Boyd
- Francisco Ernesto Sierra Fábrega
- Jorge L. González
- Luis Navas Pájaro
- Nelson Jackson Palma
- Óscar M. Ramírez
- Nicolás González Revilla
- Enrique Sánchez Salmon

== See also ==
- Suez Canal Authority
- Persian Gulf Strait Authority
