= Umm al-Fayyarin =

Omani island in Strait of Hormuz

Native name: أم الفيارين
- Location within Oman Umm al-Fayyarin (Middle East)

Geography
- Location: Strait of Hormuz
- Coordinates: 26°10′44″N 56°32′46″E

Administration
- Oman
- Governorate: Musandam
- Province: Khasab

Demographics
- Population: uninhabited

Islands near the Strait of Hormuz

Umm al-Fayyārin is an island in Musandam Governorate of Oman located in Sea of Oman. It lies 5.9 km east of Ra’s Bāshin of the Musandam Peninsula in the Sea of Oman.

In Persian this island is called Kuh-e Khāg (کوه خاگ) which means egg mountain in reference to its popularity with sea birds in the nesting season. This name is given to the island by the people of Kumzar who live in this area.

Its Arabic name is also written as Faiyarin, Faiyārīn, Umm al Faiyarin, Umm al Faiyarin Island, Umm al Faiyārīn, Umm al Faiyārīn Island, Umm al Fayarin.

Its UTM position is DP59 and its Joint Operation Graphics reference is NG40-06.
