= Operation Project Freedom =

2026 operation to open the Strait of Hormuz

- Part of the 2026 Strait of Hormuz crisis
- Location: Persian Gulf, Strait of Hormuz and Gulf of Oman
- Planned by: US Central Command
- Objective: Military escort of merchant vessels going through the strait
- Date: 4–5 May 2026 (1 day)
- Outcome: Temporarily halted
- Losses: Seven Iranian boats sunk French CMA CGM ship struck

Operation Project Freedom is a United States military operation launched on 4 May 2026 to escort merchant ships, in response to Iranian attacks on shipping in the Strait of Hormuz. (Note: Attributed to multiple sources:) The operation was temporarily paused on 5 May. It was declared the second stage of the Iran war, following the end of Operation Epic Fury.

== Background and preparation ==
During the 2026 Iran war and following the Iranian blockade of the Strait of Hormuz, in March 2026, the U.S. dropped 5,000-pound bunker-buster bombs on hardened Iranian anti-ship cruise missile sites along the Strait of Hormuz. U.S. forces also sank 16 Iranian minelayers as Iran was mining the Strait of Hormuz. Over 150 warships across 16 classes of the Iranian navy were destroyed as well as every Iran submarine was also sunk as the 2026 Iran war ceasefire took hold. In April 2026, President Donald Trump announced that the U.S. military destroyed 158 Iranian naval vessels, asserting the Iranian navy was "annihilated" and lying at the bottom of the sea. Trump stated that 28 mine-dropping vessels were sunk, with only a few small, fast-attack boats remaining.

== Initial escorts ==
An oil tanker was hit by projectiles in the Strait of Hormuz after Trump announced Operation Project Freedom. Iran said that it launched missiles towards a US warship to stop it entering the strait and two missiles had struck a US navy destroyer. The U.S. denied Iranian missiles hit a military vessel during the effort to reopen Strait of Hormuz, and also said that two American-flagged merchant ships had “successfully transited through the Strait of Hormuz” and that Navy guided-missile destroyers in the Persian Gulf were helping to restore commercial shipping traffic.

According to U.S. Secretary of State Marco Rubio, the operation aims to save 23,000 civilians from 87 countries stranded in the Persian Gulf.

Iran targeted a UAE tanker in Strait of Hormuz as U.S. began Operation Project Freedom.

Danish shipping company Maersk confirmed that a vessel belonging to one of its subsidiaries crossed the Strait of Hormuz with U.S. military escort.

The U.S. sank seven small Iranian boats while Iran launched attacks on UAE and ships in Strait of Hormuz.

On 5 May, around four hours before Trump announced the pause, a ship belonging to the French company CMA CGM was targeted and hit, injuring the crew and damaging the vessel. The ship was attempting to cross the Strait of Hormuz without Iranian approval.

== Pause ==
On 5 May, Trump announced the operation had been temporarily paused by "mutual agreement", citing progress during ongoing negotiations with Iran for a peace agreement. This came hours after Defense Secretary Pete Hegseth and Secretary of State Marco Rubio spoke to reporters regarding the operation. Hegseth described Project Freedom as "defensive in nature, focused in scope and temporary in duration," distinguishing it from the broader Operation Epic Fury in Iran.

The New York Times reported that there was no evidence of an emerging deal with Iran, and that the real reason Trump had paused the operation was that Saudi Arabia had denied the United States access to its airspace and US bases on its territory, because it felt Operation Project Freedom was not well thought-out and could result in an escalation with Iran. A phone call between Trump and the Saudi crown prince reportedly failed to solve the disagreement.

=== Fighting during temporary pause ===
May 2026 United States strikes on Iran
- Part of the 2026 Iran war and US blockade of Iran
- Type: Airstrikes, self-defense (per US)
- Location: Southern Iran and Tehran, Iran
- Date: 7 May 2026
- Executed by: United States; United Arab Emirates (per Iran)

On May 7, U.S. and Iran traded fire in Strait of Hormuz as three U.S. Navy destroyers transited the strait.

On 7 May, Iranian forces launched several missiles, drones, and small-boat attacks on three U.S. warships as they were transiting the strait, namely USS Truxtun, USS Rafael Peralta, and USS Mason.

Iranian bases in Bandar Abbas and Qeshm were struct during the exchange, and in response Saudi Arabia and Kuwait temporarily restricted US access to US bases in their territory. Iran accused U.S. of violating the truce by targeting the Iranian oil tanker and another vessel. It also said the U.S. air strikes hit civilian areas in Qeshm Island, and coastal areas in its vicinity in Bandar Khamir and Sirik. Large explosions were reported in western Tehran. The Iranian military said it targeted U.S. military vessels east of the Strait of Hormuz and south of the Chabahar Port as a response to these incidents. The United Arab Emirates claimed that its air defense systems shot down two Iranian ballistic missiles and three drones, moderately injuring three people. On the same day, US said that it carried out strikes on empty oil tankers allegedly attempting to reach Iran.

According to Tasmin News Agency, the United Arab Emirates may have been involved in the strikes on Iran.

==== Reactions ====
US president Donald Trump described the strikes as a "love tap" and insisted that the ceasefire is still in effect. CENTCOM reported that it "eliminated inbound threats and targeted Iranian military facilities responsible for attacking U.S. forces, including missile and drone launch sites; command and control locations; and intelligence, surveillance and reconnaissance nodes," and "does not seek escalation but remains positioned and ready to protect American forces."

Iran's Khatam al-Anbiya Central Headquarters said that "the criminal and aggressor America and its supporting countries should know that the Islamic Republic of Iran, as powerfully as in the past, will give a crushing response to any aggression without the slightest hesitation," and claimed that its response caused "significant damage" to U.S. warships.

Saudi Arabia expressed its disapproval of Operation Project Freedom and denied the U.S. the use of its bases and airspace.

== Impact ==
According to the Lloyd's List, ship owners and insurers said the US operation had not given them "sufficient clarity or credible protection to justify resuming transits" through the Strait, resulting in the continuation of a drop in transit volume.

In mid-June, US Defense Secretary Pete Hegseth told CBS News that "Project Freedom never stopped, and we've run 125 million barrels of oil through the straits".

== Reactions ==
=== Iran ===
Iranian lawmaker Ebrahim Azizi said any US interference in the Strait of Hormuz would be considered a violation of the ceasefire.

Iranian Armed Forces warned the US Navy against entering the Strait of Hormuz.

=== Gulf Cooperation Council ===
The Gulf Cooperation Council and UAE condemned Iran.

=== South Korea ===
On May 4, after the HMM Namu—a Panamanian-flagged cargo ship owned by HMM—was struck by an explosion and caught fire while anchored off the UAE, Trump blamed Iran without evidence and urged South Korea to join the operation; Defense Secretary Pete Hegseth also called on South Korea to protect its own ship in the Strait. In response, the South Korean government announced that it was "reviewing" its potential participation in Operation Project Freedom. As of May 6, 2026, 26 South Korean ships were stranded in the Strait of Hormuz. By 28 June 2026, only three were remaining in the Persian Gulf.

== See also ==
- 2026 Strait of Hormuz campaign
- 2026 United States naval blockade of Iran
- Operation Prosperity Guardian
- Operation Earnest Will and the Bridgeton incident
- 2026 Iran war
- 2026 Iran war ceasefire
- Misinformation during the 2026 Iran war
- Timeline of Iran war
