= Andrew Smith =

Andrew, Andy, or Drew Smith may refer to:

== Government and military ==
- Andrew Smith (British politician) (born 1951), English Labour Party politician
- Andrew Smith (Canadian politician), member of the Legislative Assembly of Manitoba
- Andrew Smith (Manx politician), member of the House of Keys
- Andrew Smith (admiral), Royal Canadian Navy officer
- Andrew Smith (Maroon), Jamaican Maroon officer
- Andrew Jackson Smith (1815–1897), American Civil War army general
- Andrew Jackson Smith (Medal of Honor) (1843–1932), American Civil War soldier
- Andrew Juxon-Smith (1931–1996), politician and military official in Sierra Leone
- Andy Smith (Minnesota politician) (born 1991)
- Drew Smith (politician), Scottish politician

== Sports ==
=== Cricket ===
- Andrew Smith (cricketer, born 1969), English cricketer
- Andrew Smith (Australian cricketer) (1889–1983), cricketer for South Australia
- Mike Smith (cricketer, born 1967) (Andrew Michael Smith), English cricketer

=== Football (soccer) ===
- Andrew Smith (footballer, born 1879) (1879–1960), Scottish footballer with West Bromwich Albion and Bristol Rovers, among other clubs
- Andrew Smith (footballer, born 1989), English footballer with Accrington Stanley
- Andy Smith (footballer, born 1890) (1890–1968), English footballer
- Andy Smith (footballer, born 1968), Scottish footballer (Airdrie, Dunfermline)
- Andy Smith (footballer, born 1980), Northern Ireland international footballer
- Andy Smith (footballer, born 2001), English footballer

=== Rugby ===
- Andrew Smith (rugby union, born 1985), Australian rugby union player
- Andrew Smith (rugby union, born 2000), Irish rugby union player
- Andy Smith (rugby league) (born 1984), English rugby league player

=== Other sports ===
- Andrew Smith (Australian footballer) (born 1960), Australian rules footballer
- Andrew Smith (badminton) (born 1984), English badminton player
- Andrew Smith (basketball, born 1990) (1990–2016), American basketball player
- Andrew Smith (basketball, born 1992), American-Latvian basketball player
- Andrew Smith (canoeist), British slalom canoeist
- Andrew Smith (field hockey) (born 1978), Australian field hockey player
- Andrew Smith (golfer) (1849–1901), Canadian amateur golfer
- Andrew Smith (sprinter) (born 1964), Jamaican sprinter
- Andrew W. Smith (1886–1959), American football player and coach, college athletics administrator, US Army officer, and physician
- Andy Smith (American football) (1883–1926), American college football coach
- Andy Smith (darts player) (born 1967), darts player who competes in Professional Darts Corporation events
- Andy Smith (hurler) (born 1983), Irish hurler
- Andy Smith (runner) (born 1982), American steeplechaser, All-American for the NC State Wolfpack track and field team
- Andy Smith (speedway rider) (born 1966), former Speedway Grand Prix rider
- Drew Smith (baseball) (born 1993), baseball player

== Literature and journalism ==
- Andrew Smith (journalist and non-fiction writer) (born 1961), American-born British journalist and non-fiction writer
- Andrew Smith (Scottish writer) (born 1962), British screenwriter, playwright and author, known for his work on Doctor Who
- Andrew Smith (columnist) (born 1958), American columnist and editor, best known as "Captain Comics"
- Andrew A. Smith (born 1959), American young adult fiction writer
- Andrew F. Smith (born 1946), American food historian
- Andrew Phillip Smith (born 1966), Welsh writer
- Andy Smith (entrepreneur) (born 1968), American author and entrepreneur
- Drew Nellins Smith, American writer
- Drew Smith (food writer) (born 1950), English food writer and critic

== Other fields ==
- Andrew Smith (bishop) (born 1944), suffragan bishop of the Episcopal Diocese of Connecticut
- Andrew Smith (judge) (born 1947), judge of the High Court of England and Wales
- Andrew Smith (zoologist) (1797–1872), Scottish zoologist
- Andrew Smith (1836–1894), one of the Smith Brothers who were makers of cough drops
- Andrew Smith Hallidie (1836–1900), American rail transport designer and promoter, born as Andrew Smith
- Andrew Smith (palaeontologist) (born 1954), British palaeontologist
- Andrew Hayden-Smith (born 1983), English actor, presenter; formerly known as Andrew Smith
- Andrew Hugh Smith (1931–2012), British businessman
- Andrew Lavern Smith (1960–1998), American serial killer
- Andrew Lawrenceson Smith (1620–1694), Scottish painter
- Andrew Reynolds Smith (born 1966), British businessman
- Andrew Smith (drummer) (1950–2000), American drummer, producer, and arranger
- Andrew Smith (entomologist), Canadian entomologist
- Andrew Smyth (engineer) (born 1991), British engineer and baker
- Greedy Smith (Andrew McArthur Smith, 1956–2019), Australian singer for Mental As Anything

== See also ==
- Andre Smith (disambiguation)
