= Combat Logistics Battalion 31 =

- Combat Logistics Battalion 31 Insignia
- Active: 15 June 1979 – Current
- Country: United States of America
- Allegiance: United States of America
- Branch: United States Marine Corps
- Type: Combat Logistics
- Role: Amphibious / Expeditionary
- Size: Battalion
- Part of: 3rd Marine Logistics Group _{(Administratively)} 31st Marine Expeditionary Unit _{(Operationally)}
- Garrison/HQ: Camp Hansen, Okinawa, Japan
- Nickname: Atlas Battalion
- Mottos: Ready, Reliable, and Responsive
- Engagements: Operation Desert Fox, Operation Iraqi Freedom

Commanders
- Current commander: LtCol Margaret A. Jones
- Notable commanders: LtCol Matthew D. Verdin (2022-2024) LtCol Stanley P. Calixte (2020-2022) LtCol Christopher Johnson (2018-2020); LtCol Siebrand Niewenhous (2016-2018); LtCol Eric C. Malinowski (2014-2016); LtCol Omar Randall (2012-2014, now a Brigadier General); LtCol William Arick (2010-2012); LtCol Patrick Wall (2008-2010); LtCol Scott Erdelatz (2006-2008); LtCol Alex Vohr (2004-2006); LtCol Thomas Gorry (2002-2004; now a BGen); LtCol Peter T. Underwood (1998-2000); LtCol John Chandler (1996-1998); LtCol Willie Williams (1994-1996; LtGen, Retired); LtCol Phillip Eve (1992-1994) LtCol Dave Jacobus (1992)

Combat Logistics Battalion 31 (CLB-31) is a logistics battalion of the United States Marine Corps. CLB-31 is the Logistics Combat Element (LCE) of the 31st Marine Expeditionary Unit (31st MEU), the only continuously forward-deployed MEU in the Marine Corps.

As the Logistics Combat Element, Combat Logistics Battalion 31 provides all elements of the MEU with combat service support. To do this, CLB-31 comprises a Headquarters, a Motor Transport Platoon, Engineer Platoon, Explosive Ordnance Disposal (EOD) Platoon, Maintenance Platoon, Supply Platoon, Military Police Platoon, Landing Support Platoon, Communications Platoon and its Health Service Support. Additionally, CLB-31 provides the 31st MEU with ammunition, postal and disbursing services.

Although CLB-31 is assigned to the 3rd Marine Logistics Group, the battalion remains permanently assigned to the 31st MEU. CLB-31 is based on Camp Hansen in Okinawa, Japan.

== Mission ==
Provide ground combat service support to the 31st Marine Expeditionary Unit to conduct special operations as directed and to act as the nucleus for expanded combat service support operations.

== Atlas Battalion ==
In ancient Greek mythology, Atlas was the primordial Titan who held up the celestial spheres. His burden, according to myth, would be to forever carry the weight of the universe on his shoulders. Atlas represents the spirit of a battalion that keeps the rest of the effort moving forward.
CLB-31 adopted the title of Atlas Battalion in June 2012.

== Task Organization ==
Headquarters Company:

- S-1, S-2, S-3, Explosive Ordnance Disposal (EOD) section, Mobility, S-4, Supply, S-6, Disbursing

Combat Logistics Company Alpha:

- Distribution Platoon:

- Landing Support (LS) Section - “Red Patchers"
- Motor Transport Section (Motor-T)

- Engineer Section - Combat Engineers, Heavy Equipment, Bulk Water, Bulk Fuel, Utilities

Combat Logistics Company Bravo:

- Distribution Platoon

- Landing Support (LS) Section - “Red Patchers"
- Motor Transport (Motor-T) Section

- Engineer Section - Combat Engineers, Heavy Equipment, Bulk Water, Bulk Fuel, Utilities

General Support Company:

- Maintenance Platoon - Comm Maint., Engineer Maint., Motor Transport Maint., Ordnance Maint.
- Health Services Support (HSS) Platoon - General Medical, Dental, Shock Trauma - STP
- Supply Operations Platoon - Intermediate Supply, Distribution Liaison Cell

== Special Capabilities ==
In addition to direct logistics support the attached Battalion Landing Team and general logistics support to the 31st MEU, CLB-31 is tasked with three special capabilities as part of the Maritime Contingency Force:

- Mass Casualty Evacuation (Nightingale)
- Evacuation Control Center/Non-Combatant Evacuation Operations (ECC/NEO)
- Humanitarian Assistance/Disaster Relief (HA/DR)
- Humanitarian Assistance Survey Team (HAST)

== History ==
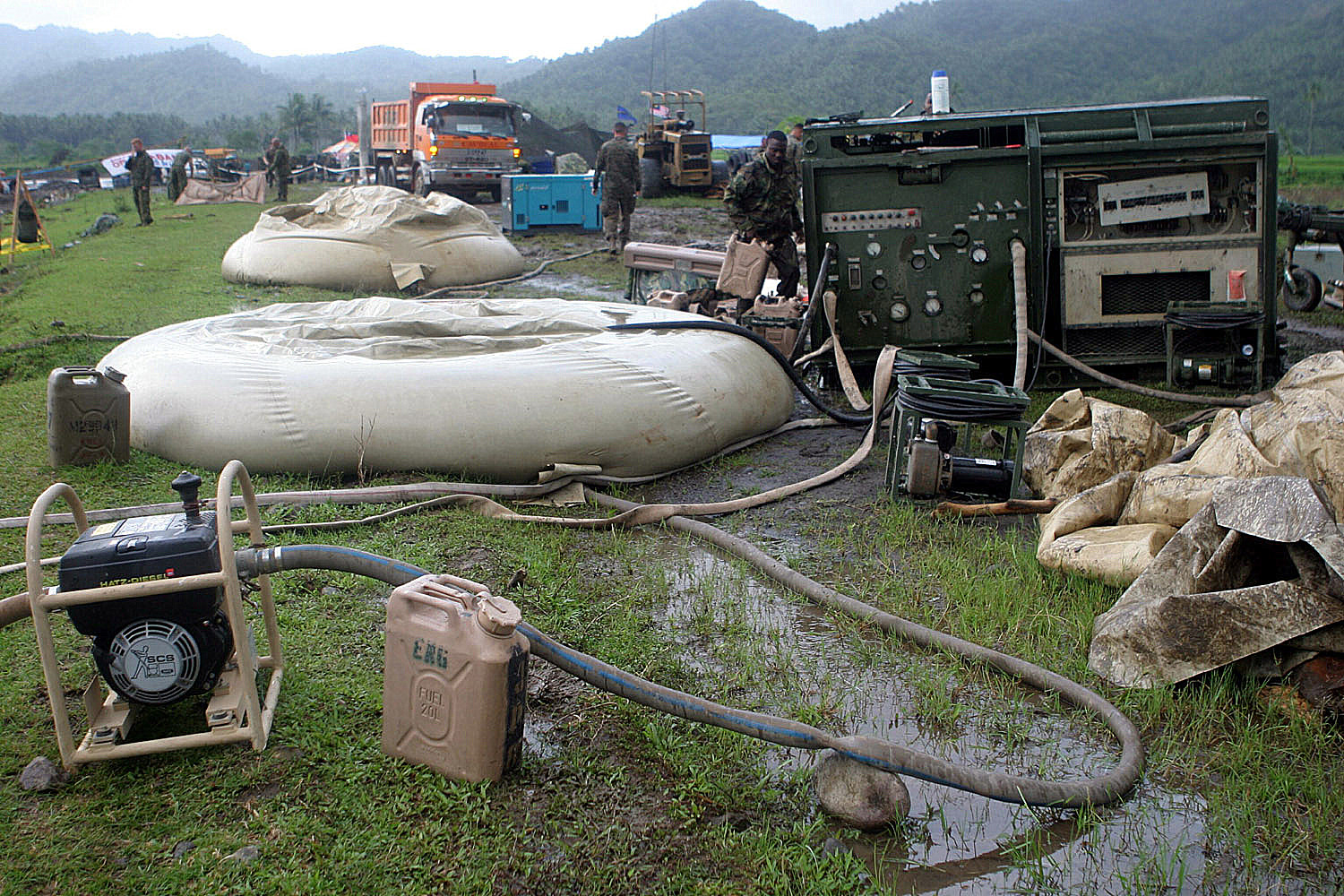
Marines from CLB-31 operate ROWPUs for relief efforts after the 2006 Southern Leyte mudslide

Though the 31st Marine Amphibious Unit had been with logisticians since inception, Combat Logistics Battalion 31 traces its lineage to the activation of Logistics Support Unit 31, 31st Marine Amphibious Unit, Fleet Marine Forces Pacific on 15 June 1979 at Kaneohe Bay, Hawaii. The unit was re-designated 17 October 1979 as Marine Amphibious Unit Service Support Group 31 (MSSG-31), 31st Marine Amphibious Unit (31st MAU).

MSSG-31 was deactivated with the other elements of the 31st Marine Amphibious Unit in Spring 1985 (Officially, 29 April 1985).

The staff nucleus of the unit was activated in May 1992, and with the augmentation of personnel and sourcing of equipment from the 3rd Force Service Support Group, the newly re-established Marine Expeditionary Unit Service Support Group 31 was operational by the end of the year. MSSG-31 was officially reactivated on 1 August 1992 at Camp Kinser, Okinawa, Japan; without a break, the MSSG/CLB has participated in every operation with the 31st MEU since that time.

- In December 1998, 31st MEU and the Belleau Wood ARG was the theater reserve for Operation Desert Fox; MSSG-31 split off with half the ARG to conduct a non-combatant evacuation of 90 American citizens from Kuwait while the rest of the MEU participated in the WMD strike.
- In September–October 1999 and again in January–February 2000, MSSG-31 was part of the Special-Purpose Marine Air-Ground Task Force East Timor supporting Operation Stabilise: the Australian-led International Forces in East Timor aiding the new United Nations Transitional Administration East Timor.
- September 2004-March 2005: Conducted combat operations in support of Operation Iraqi Freedom, to include participation in Operation Phantom Fury. Cdr. Richard Jadick describes his interactions with MSSG-31 in Fallujah:

″There were times when we almost ran out of supplies, and we'd have to get on the radio and call out to RCT-7 – or if they didn't respond, to MSSG-31, the MEU Service Support Group, who never let us down – for another corpsman or more bandages, Ace wraps, or Mylar space blankets, to keep the casualties from losing heat. It was truly hell...″

- February 2006: Provided Disaster Relief assistance to the Philippines following mudslides in southern Leyte.
- May–June 2008: Provided Disaster Relief assistance as part of Operation Caring Response followingCyclone Nargis in Myanmar.
- October 2009: Provided Disaster Relief assistance in Luzon, Philippines after Typhoons Ketsana and Parma hit back to back.
- October 2010: Provided Disaster Relief assistance in Luzon, Philippines after Super Typhoon Megi.
- March 2011: Operation Tomodachi - Sailed from Indonesia to mainland Japan to assist recovery efforts following the 9.0 Tohoku earthquake and following tsunami. On top of delivering 82 tons of food, water and relief supplies, CLB-31 joined the 31st MEU ashore on Oshima Island to remove debris, deliver critical supplies to the isolated area, and provide life support.
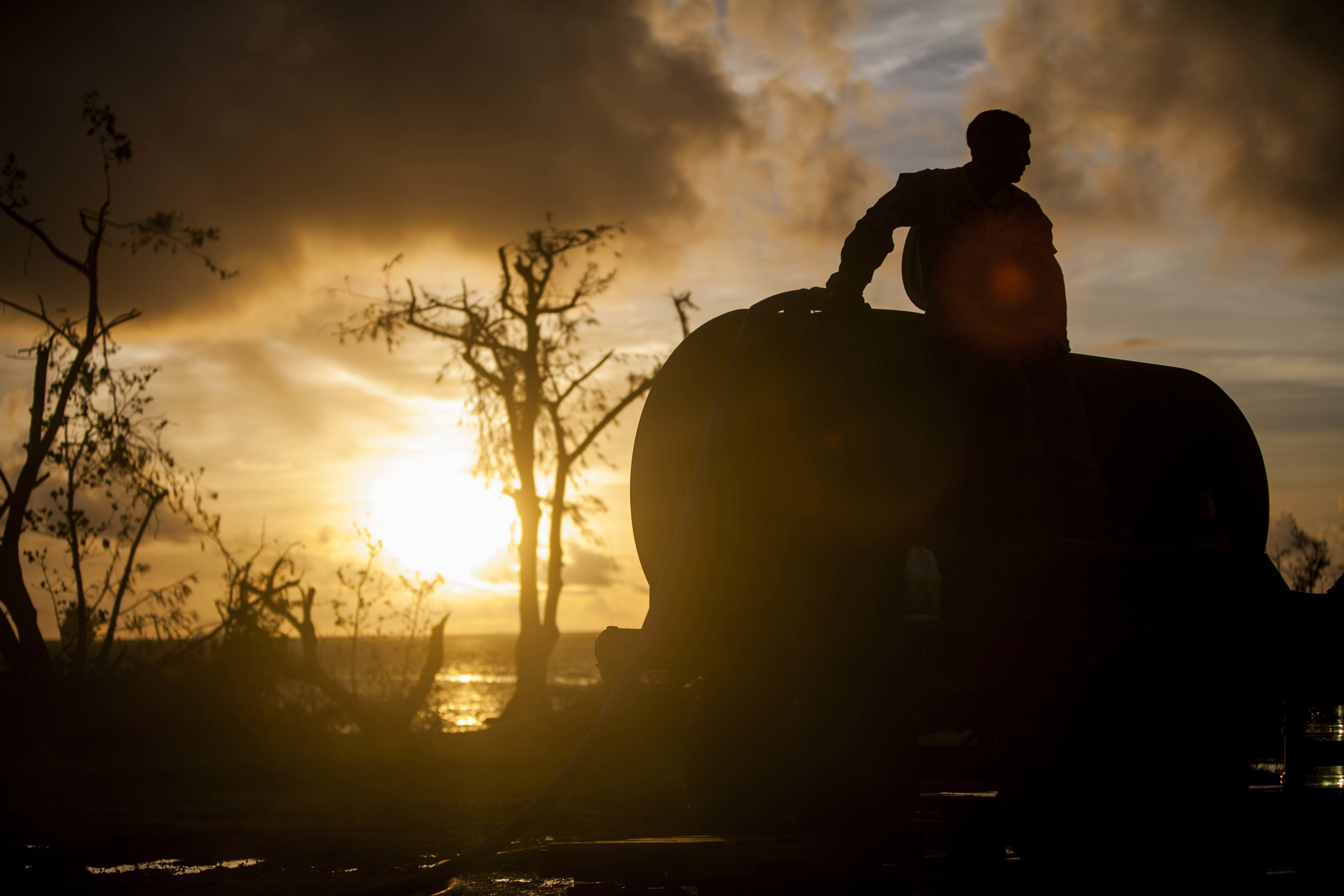
- A Marine fills a water bull at a water distribution site during typhoon relief efforts in Saipan, 19 Aug. 2015.
  August 2015: While executing the 31st MEU's Certification Exercise in vicinity of Guam and Palau, elements of CLB-31 were redirected in order to perform Defense Support of Civilian Authorities (DSCA) operations, providing disaster relief to the island of Saipan in the Commonwealth of the Northern Mariana Islands in the wake of Typhoon Soudelor (2015). While in Saipan, the battalion used organic water production equipment to produce 279,375 gallons of water. Combined with the water producing capability of the USS Ashland (LSD-48), the battalion distributed a total of 366,200 gallons of potable drinking water to members of the population of Saipan affected by the disaster. 255 pallets of FEMA and NGO supplies, consisting of 47,040 meals, 16,625 gallons of bottled and boxed water, and American Red Cross relief supplies, were distributed to shelters and distribution locations throughout the island. The battalion ensured the uninterrupted operation of the island's emergency services communication network by delivering generator power to a communication tower on the highest point of the island. The battalion, in conjunction with Golf Company, BLT 2/5, and crew from the USS ASHLAND, also contributed 3,031-man hours to clearing storm debris from the campuses of six schools and two public parks, ensuring the children of Saipan were able to return to school in a timely manner.
- April 2016: CLB-31 sent the Humanitarian Assistance Survey Team (HAST) with the Forward Command Element (FCE) to Kumamoto, Japan following an earthquake.
- March 2016: CLB-31 participated in Exercise Ssang Yong 16. The battalion's Combat Logistics Operation Center (CLOC) and Logistics Support Area (LSA) were established aboard Suseongri Range, providing Combat Service Support (CSS) to sustain training units at seven remote training areas in the vicinity of Pohang, South Korea.
- June 2016: LtCol Niewenhous assumed command of CLB-31.
- September 2016: CLB-31 participated in Exercise VALIANT SHIELD providing enablers for the MEU's raids and missions.
- October 2016: CLB-31 participated in PHIBLEX- 33. CLB-31 operated out of various areas to include: Crow Valley, Clark Air Force Base, NETC, and Subic Bay which allowed them to participate in Joint Training Exercises with the Pilipino Marine Corps. CLB-31 also provided logistical support to BLT 2/4 for various mission requirements.

== See also ==
- List of United States Marine Corps battalions
- Organization of the United States Marine Corps
