= General Miller =

General Miller may refer to:

== United Kingdom ==
- Alfred Douglas Miller (1864−1933), British Army brigadier general
- Euan Miller (1897–1985), British Army lieutenant general

== United States ==
=== U.S. Army ===
- Austin S. Miller (born 1961), general
- Charles R. Miller (general) (fl. 1990s–2020s), major general
- Geoffrey D. Miller (born 1949), major general
- Harry E. Miller Jr. (born c. 1958), major general
- Henry J. F. Miller (1890–1949), Air Forces general
- John E. Miller (general) (born 1941), lieutenant general
- John Franklin Miller (senator) (1831–1886), Union Army brevet major general
- Luther D. Miller (1890–1972), major general
- Marcus P. Miller (1835–1906), brigadier general
- Thomas G. Miller (fl. 1970s–2010s), lieutenant general

=== U.S. Air Force ===
- David N. Miller (fl. 1990s–2020s), brigadier general
- David V. Miller (1919–2016), major general
- George D. Miller (born 1930), lieutenant general
- Maryanne Miller (fl. 1980s–2010s), general
- Monte B. Miller (1930–2015), lieutenant general
- Robert I. Miller (born 1963), lieutenant general
- Tom D. Miller (fl. 1990s–2020s), major general

=== U.S. Marines Corps ===
- Edward J. Miller (USMC) (1922–1993), lieutenant general
- Gerald L. Miller (born 1942), brigadier general
- John C. Miller Jr. (1912–2000), brigadier general
- John H. Miller (1925–2025), lieutenant general
- Lyle H. Miller (1889–1973), brigadier general
- Walter Lee Miller Jr. (fl. 1970s–2010s), major general

=== Other U.S. services ===
- Charles Miller (businessman) (1843–1927), Pennsylvania Army National Guard major general
- James Miller (general) (1776–1851), brigadier general in the War of 1812
- Johnny R. Miller (fl. 1980s–2010s), Illinois Army National Guard major general
- Nathan Miller (Rhode Island shipbuilder) (1743–1790), Continental Army general in the American Revolution
- William Miller (Confederate Army officer) (1820–1909), Confederate States Army brigadier general

== Other ==
- Guillermo Miller (1795–1861), Peruvian general
- Yevgeny Miller (1867–1939), general in the White Russian army

== See also ==
- General Millar (disambiguation)
- Attorney General Miller (disambiguation)
- Captain Miller (disambiguation)
