= Andrew David Smith =

Andrew David Smith may refer to:

- Andrew Smith (British politician) (born 1951), British politician
- Drew Smith (baseball) (born 1993), American baseball player

== See also ==
- Andrew Smith (disambiguation)
