= General Millar =

General Millar may refer to:

- David Millar (RCAF officer) (fl. 1980s–2020s), Royal Canadian Air Force lieutenant general
- Edward Alexander Millar (1860–1934), U.S. Army brigadier general
- William Millar (British Army officer) (died 1838), British Army lieutenant general

== See also ==
- General Miller (disambiguation)
