= David Millar (RCAF officer) =

Royal Canadian Air Force officer

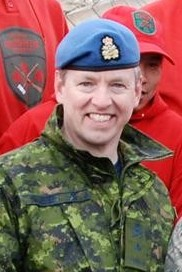
- Millar as commander Join Task Force (North)
- Allegiance: Canada
- Branch: Royal Canadian Air Force (Note: Known as Air Command until 2011)
- Service years: 1980–present
- Rank: Lieutenant General
- Commands: Joint Task Force (North); Chief of Military Personnel
- Awards: Commander of the Order of Military Merit; Canadian Forces' Decoration

Lieutenant General David Byron Millar CMM CD is a Royal Canadian Air Force officer. He previously served as the Chief of Military Personnel, where he was the senior officer responsible for all Canadian Armed Forces human resource policies.

== Military career ==
=== Chief of Military Personnel ===
On February 20, 2013, Millar was appointed Chief of Military Personnel, taking over for Rear-Admiral Andrew Smith.

== Personal ==
Millar and his wife, Sheila, live in their home in Ottawa, Ontario.

== Notes ==
Military offices
Preceded by Rear-Admiral Andrew Smith	Chief of Military Personnel; 2013–2015	Succeeded by Lieutenant-General Christine Whitecross
