= Captain Miller =

Captain Miller may refer to:

- Captain Miller (Tamil militant), a Sri Lankan Tamil member of the Liberation Tigers of Tamil Eelam
- Captain Miller (film), a 2024 Indian Tamil-language film

- Captain Miller (soundtrack), accompanying soundtrack

== See also ==
- General Miller (disambiguation)
