= Andre Smith =

Andre Smith may refer to:

== Sports ==
=== American football ===
- Andre Smith (offensive tackle) (born 1987), American football offensive tackle
- Andre Smith (tight end) (born 1988), American football tight end
- Andre Smith (linebacker) (born 1997), American football linebacker

=== Basketball ===
- Andre Smith (basketball, born 1958), American college basketball player for the Nebraska Cornhuskers
- Andre Smith (basketball, born 1985), American expatriate professional basketball

== Others ==
- J. Andre Smith (1880–1959), American war artist

== See also ==
- Andrew Smith (disambiguation)
