= Attorney General Miller =

Attorney General Miller may refer to:

- Albert C. Miller (1898–1979), Attorney General of South Dakota
- Andrew Miller (North Dakota judge) (1870–1960), Attorney General of North Dakota
- Andrew P. Miller (born 1932), Attorney General of Virginia
- Bert H. Miller (1876–1949), Attorney General of Idaho
- Robert Byron Miller (1825–1902), Attorney-General of Tasmania
- Tom Miller (politician) (born 1944), Attorney General of Iowa
- Vern Miller (1928–2021), Attorney General of Kansas
- Victor A. Miller (1916–1984), interim Attorney General of Wisconsin
- William H. H. Miller (1840–1917), Attorney General of the United States

== See also ==
- General Miller (disambiguation)
