= 31st Marine Expeditionary Unit =

US Marine Corps unit

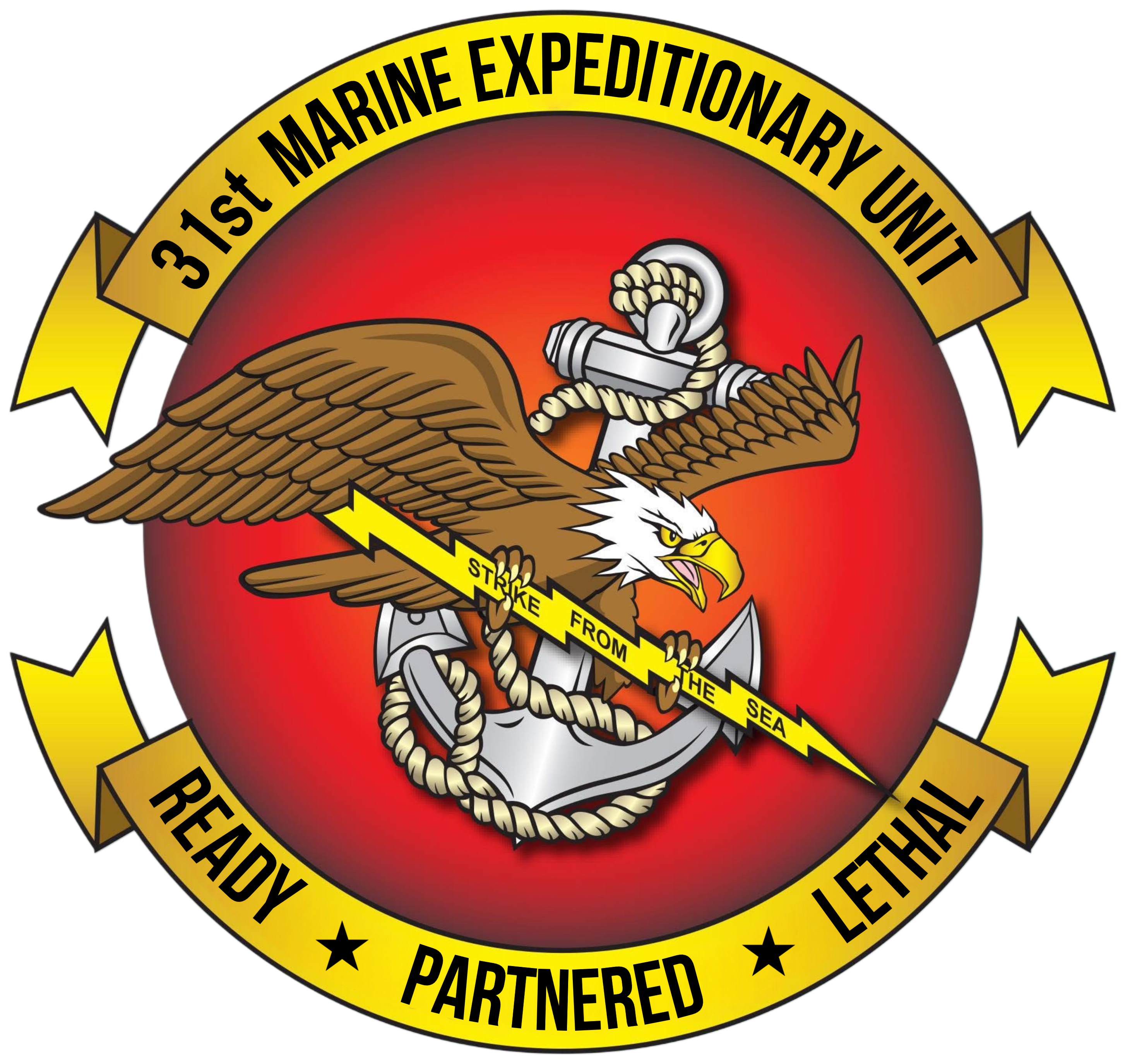
- 31st MEU Insignia
- Active: 1 March 1967 – May 1985; 9 September 1992 – present
- Allegiance: United States
- Branch: United States Marine Corps
- Type: Special Operations Capable - Marine Air Ground Task Force
- Role: Forward-deployed expeditionary and rapid-response force
- Size: Around 2,500 Marines and Sailors
- Part of: III Marine Expeditionary Force
- Garrison/HQ: Camp Hansen, MCB Camp Butler
- Nickname: SAVAGE
- Mottos: "Ready, Partnered, Lethal"
- Anniversaries: Activated 1 March 1967
- Engagements: Vietnam War; Operation Union; Operation Eagle Pull; Operation Frequent Wind; Multinational Force in Lebanon; Operation Southern Watch; Operation Desert Fox; Operation Iraqi Freedom; Operation Phantom Fury; Operation Caring Response; Operation Tomodachi; Naval blockade of Iran
- Website: https://www.31stmeu.marines.mil/

Commanders
- Current commander: Colonel Jason R. Laird

The 31st Marine Expeditionary Unit (31st MEU) is one of seven Marine Expeditionary Units in existence in the United States Marine Corps. The Marine Expeditionary Unit is a Marine Air Ground Task Force with a strength of about 2,500 Marines and Sailors.

The 31st MEU consists of a company-sized command element; a battalion landing team (BLT), an infantry battalion reinforced with artillery, amphibious vehicles and other attachments; a medium tiltrotor squadron (reinforced), which includes detachments of short take-off, V/STOL aircraft; heavy, light, and attack helicopters; Combat Logistics Battalion 31.

The 31st MEU is based at Camp Hansen, Marine Corps Base Camp Smedley D. Butler, Okinawa, Japan. The 31st MEU is the only permanently-forward-deployed MEU, and provides a flexible and lethal force ready to perform a wide range of military, humanitarian, and diplomatic operations as the premier crisis response force in the Indo-Pacific region.

The 31st MEU is the only MEU that has retained a battalion landing team with small-boat capability to conduct raids.

== Current subordinate units ==
- Ground Combat Element: Battalion Landing Team 3rd Battalion, 1st Marines
- Aviation Combat Element: Marine Medium Tiltrotor Squadron (VMM) 265 (Rein.), Marine Fighter Attack Squadron (VMFA) 121
- Logistics Combat Element: Combat Logistics Battalion 31

== History ==
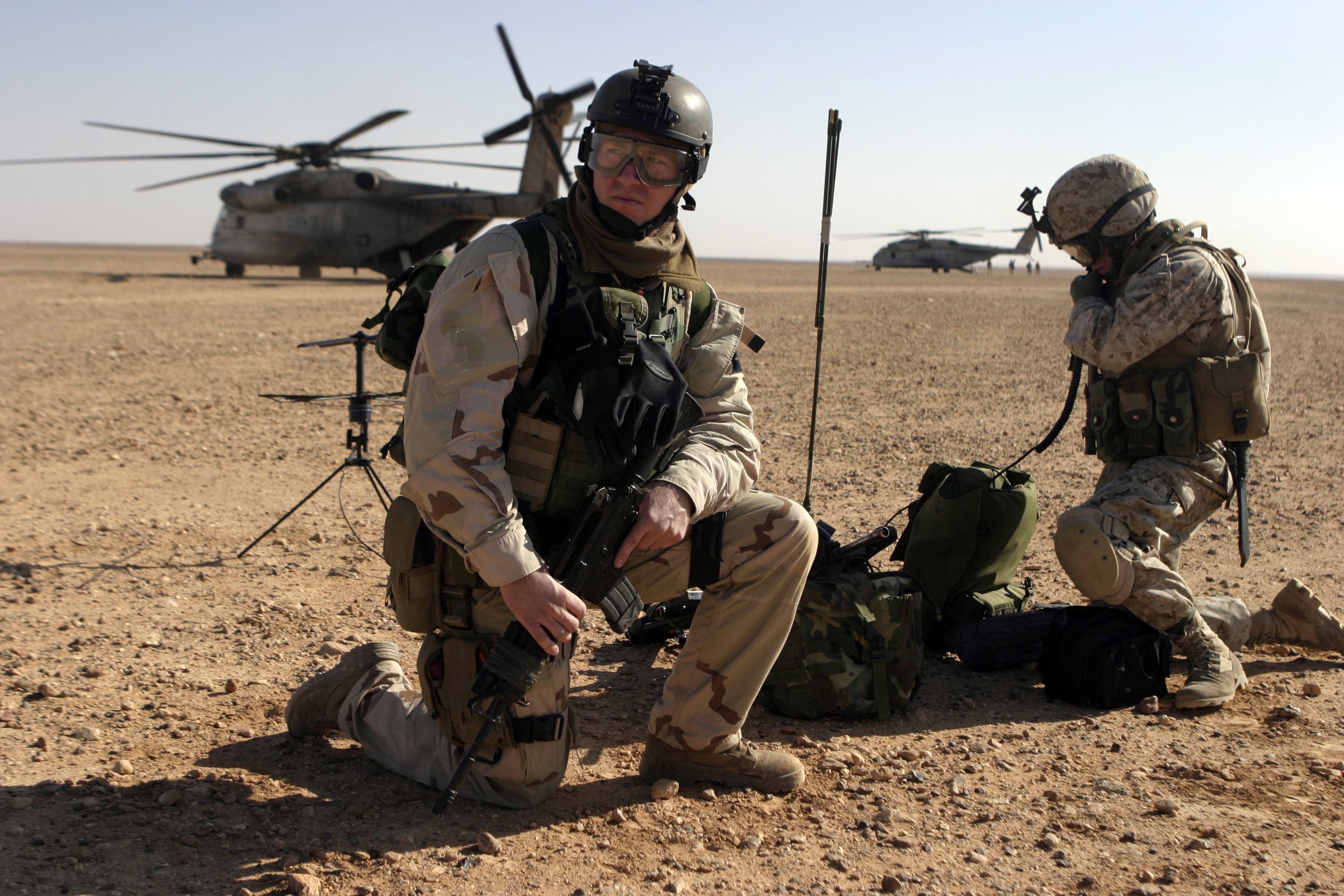
31st Marine Expeditionary Unit EOD technicians inspecting construction at an Iraqi border fort near the border with Syria, December 2004

=== Vietnam War ===
==== Combat operations ====
The 31st Marine Expeditionary Unit was commissioned on 1 March 1967, as Special Landing Force Alpha, for operations in Vietnam. The unit made the first of many amphibious deployments from Okinawa to the coast of Vietnam on 10 April 1967.

The first operation conducted was on 14 April 1967, when the MEU conducted a rescue of the crew of SS Silver Peak, a Panamanian vessel run aground by Typhoon Violet, in vicinity of Minami Ko Shima Island, Japan. Days later, SLF Alpha was committed to Operation Union, a search and destroy mission in Vietnam.

It was during this period of intense combat that SLF Alpha earned the Presidential Unit Citation. The unit participated in continuing combat operations ashore over the next three years, including the Vietnam Tet counteroffensive in 1969, while returning to Okinawa periodically for re-outfitting and the rotation of forces.

Special Landing Force Alpha was officially designated as the 31st Marine Amphibious Unit (MAU) on 24 November 1970. Once more the unit returned to the Gulf of Tonkin. This time the 31st MAU was not committed to overt land operations, as the Vietnam War was winding down. The 31st MAU performed presence missions and conducted a series of special operations to May 1971. From June 1971 until April 1975, the 31st MAU conducted many deployments to the waters off Vietnam.

==== Operation Eagle Pull ====
On 6 January 1975, Commander in Chief Pacific Command (CINCPAC) placed the 31st MAU on 96-hour alert to move the evacuation fleet into the Gulf of Thailand for the possible implementation of Operation Eagle Pull, the evacuation of the United States Embassy in Phnom Penh, Cambodia. On the afternoon of 11 April 1975, the 31st MAU received orders to execute Operation Eagle Pull.

At 06:00 on 12 April 12 x CH-53s of HMH-462 launched from the deck of USS Okinawa and moved a security force of 360 Marines ashore. The majority of the evacuation proceeded smoothly with HMH-462 transporting 84 US nationals and 205 Cambodians and third country nationals. By 10:41 all the evacuees, including Ambassador John Gunther Dean and President Saukham Khoy had been extracted. Helicopters of HMH-463, operating from USS Hancock, began to land to extract the ground security force. Beginning at approximately 10:50, 107 mm rocket and 82 mm mortar fire began impacting in the vicinity of LZ Hotel. At 10:59, the last element of 2nd Battalion, 4th Marines left the zone. The last Marine helicopter landed on USS Okinawa at 12:15.

On 13 April, the evacuees were flown to U-Tapao Air Base in Thailand. Amphibious Ready Group Alpha proceeded to the South China Sea to rendezvous with Task Force 76 as it stood by to implement Operation Frequent Wind, the evacuation of Saigon.

==== Operation Frequent Wind ====
After departing the Gulf of Thailand, the 31st MAU was attached to the 9th Marine Amphibious Brigade in support of Operation Frequent Wind, the final evacuation of Saigon as North Vietnamese forces entered the city.

=== 1980s and 1990s ===
The 31st MAU at this time was established as the only permanently forward-deployed U.S. presence in the Western Pacific, Southern Pacific, and Indian Ocean with Special Operations capabilities. In February 1980, the USS Okinawa task force, already with Marine Cobra gunships and Harrier attack aircraft from California, made port at Pearl Harbor to take aboard the final elements of the MEU, which consisted of 3rd Battalion, 3rd Marines (3/3), helicopters from MAG-24, Force Recon, and Marine Amphibious Unit Service Support Group 31 (MSSG-31) in support, all out of Kaneohe Bay's 1st Marine Brigade. On 24 April, this group in support of 3/3 Marines rendezvoused with the aircraft carrier USS Nimitz off the coast of Iran, as a reserve in the ill-fated Operation Eagle Claw, the failed attempt to rescue of the 53 American captives at the Embassy of the United States, Tehran.

Combat operations were replaced by regional exercises, which allowed training opportunities in a variety of countries. During the late 1970s and early 1980s, the 31st MEU engaged in humanitarian operations, for example, the 1984 floods in Bangladesh. In 1983, the 31st MEU was recalled from a combined exercise with local forces in Kenya and positioned in the Mediterranean Sea.

From September to October 1983, its mission was to support the Multinational U.S. peacekeeping forces in Beirut, during an intense period of complex political and life-threatening conditions in Lebanon. They took over the command operations after their sister unit, the 24th MEU, was attacked in the Beirut bombing. It was the 31st MEU's last military operation of that period. In May 1985, the unit was deactivated on ship, off the shore of San Diego. During this time the 31st MEU was based at the Marine Barracks, Subic Bay Naval Station.

On 9 September 1992, the unit was redesignated as the 31st Marine Expeditionary Unit (Special Operations Capable). In 1994, the unit was relocated to its current home station at Camp Hansen, in Okinawa, Japan.

In November 1998, Saddam Hussein's regime was failing to comply with United Nations resolutions and interfering with weapons inspectors looking for weapons of mass destruction. As the crisis came to a head, the 31st MEU was recalled to Okinawa. At the time, most of the MEU's Marines were on Guam conducting urban warfare training, and a new infantry battalion had just arrived from CONUS. All Marines and equipment were loaded by 11 November, at which time the ships set sail for the Persian Gulf. From November 1998 to February 1999, the 31st MEU sailed off the coast of Kuwait, participating in Operation Southern Watch and Operation Desert Fox.

The 31st MEU, in concert with Amphibious Squadron Eleven (Phibron 11), deployed to support Australian Defence Force (ADF) operations in East Timor from 30 September 1999, to 26 October 1999. Flying from USS Belleau Wood, the MEU conducted "lily pad" operations around East Timor, providing security, logistics, and communications support for the International Force East Timor (INTERFET) led by Major General Peter Cosgrove from the Australian Army. The Marines distributed more than 500 tons of food, water, and supplies around East Timor during this time.

=== 21st century ===
In January 2000, a Special Purpose Marine Air-Ground Task Force consisting of Golf Company, 2nd Battalion, 5th Marines, Charlie Company 1st Battalion 5th Marines, then the MEU's Battalion Landing Team; portions of the Command Element; HMM-265, and MSSG-31 deployed to East Timor aboard USS Juneau. In East Timor, the Marines and sailors supported the transition from the Australian-led INTERFET to the new United Nations Transitional Administration East Timor (UNTAET).

Late in the evening of 11 September 2001, all US forces were secured to their quarters as Super Typhoon Nari was passing over Okinawa. After the September 11 attacks, the MEU received a 96-hour warning order for deployment and was notified that naval shipping was en route to embark them soonest. Marines prepared to deploy and began staging equipment as the storm continued. The helicopter squadron was the last to board due to the passing storm, and the on-load was successfully completed in 93 hours. The MEU immediately steamed south towards its expected destination, Afghanistan. As the ships passed Singapore, the MEU was re-tasked to support UNTAET operations in East Timor. The 15th Marine Expeditionary Unit, returning from a deployment to East Timor, was assigned the task of supporting combat operations in Afghanistan.

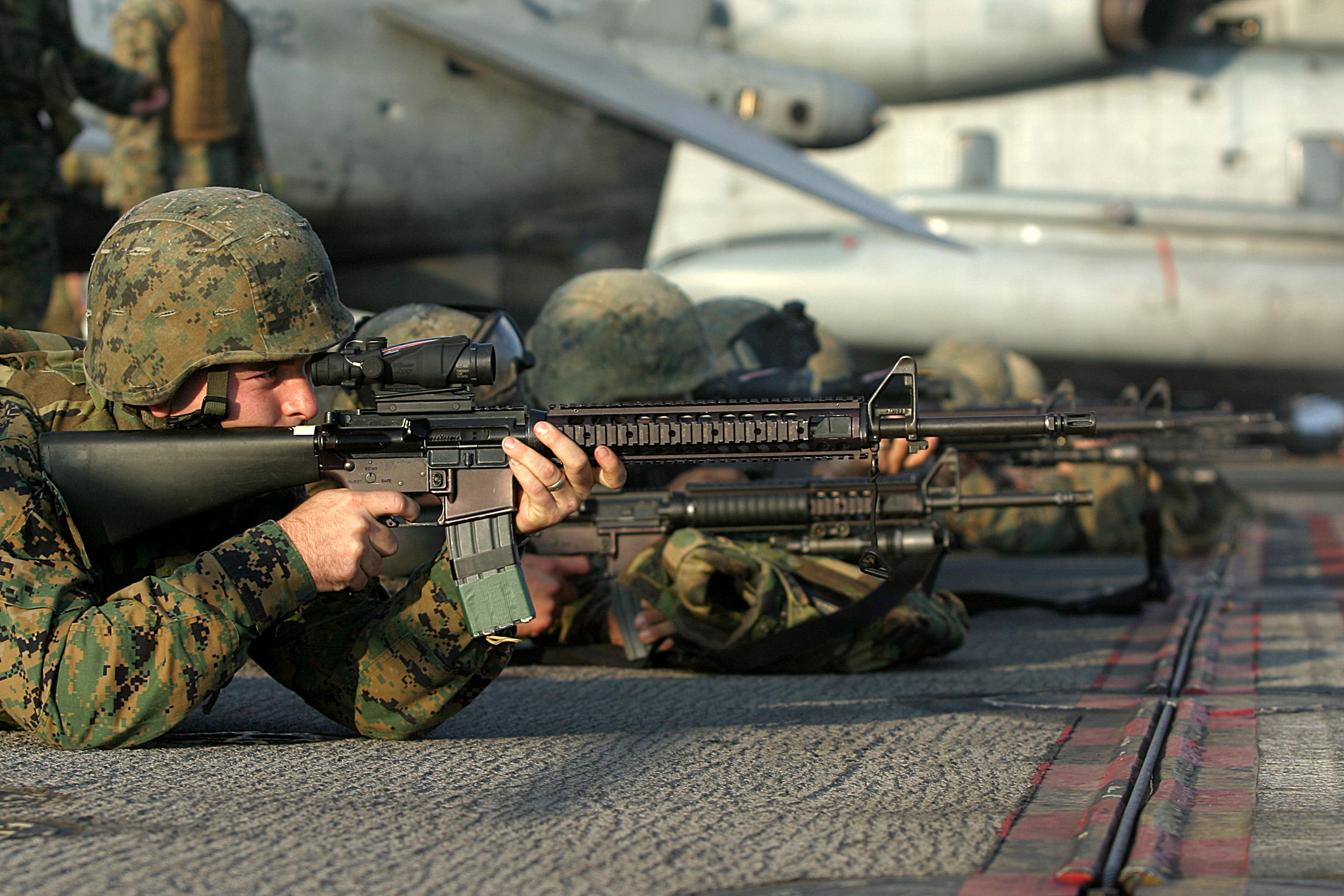
Marines training on USS Essex

From September 2004 to March 2005, the 31st MEU, including Battalion Landing Team 1st Battalion 3rd Marines with attached Charlie Battery of 1st Battalion 12th Marines, conducted combat actions during the Iraq War. Participation included a major role in Operation Phantom Fury, the clearing of Fallujah in November 2004. With organizational changes to Marine Corps' reconnaissance units in 2006, all the MEU's Special Operations Capable (SOC) designations were removed. The 31st MEU then became titled as a Maritime Contingency Force, although it remains capable of conducting the same wide variety of specialized missions on both sea and land.

In February 2006, the 31st MEU was sent to the Philippines to provide relief assistance during the mudslides in southern Leyte.

On 21 September 2007, the 31st MEU Command Element dedicated its headquarters building at Camp Hansen, Okinawa to Sergeant Rafael Peralta, who died in Iraq during Operation Phantom Fury, while assigned to the 31st MEU BLT 1/3 Alpha Company 1st Platoon. Sgt Peralta received the Navy Cross for his actions in Fallujah.

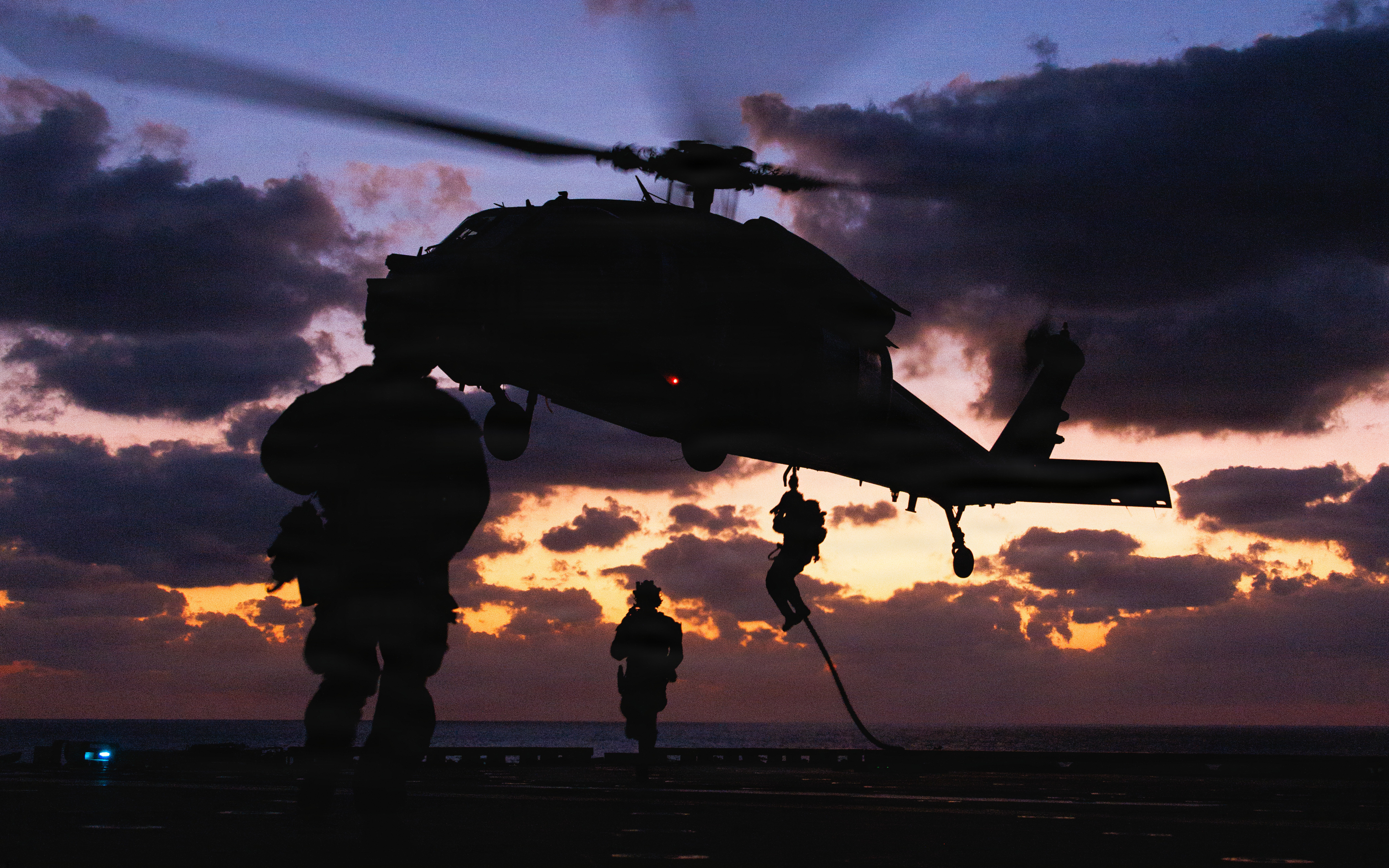
U.S. Marines with Force Reconnaissance Platoon, Maritime Raid Force, 31st Marine Expeditionary Unit, conduct a fast rope exercise in the Philippine Sea, Feb. 12, 2026.

From 13 May to 5 June 2008, Marines of the 31st MEU sailing aboard the USS Essex's expeditionary strike group waited off the coast of Burma prepared to provide relief as part of Operation Caring Response following Cyclone Nargis. US leaders sent the strike group home in early June after failing to gain permission for them to come ashore from the Burmese government.

In October 2009, the MEU assisted in humanitarian & disaster relief in Luzon, Philippines after Typhoons Ketsana and Parma hit back to back. Simultaneously, elements of the MEU assisted in Sumatra, Indonesia after earthquakes struck the region.

In October 2010, the 31st MEU conducted humanitarian assistance and disaster relief operations in northern Luzon after Super Typhoon Megi hit the Philippines.

==== Operation Tomodachi, Japan – 2011 ====
The 31st MEU was split into three separate parts on 11 March 2011, the day of the 9.0 earthquake and tsunami. The largest ship, USS LHD-2, with most of the Marines and sailors of the 31st MEU aboard, had just completed an exercise in Cambodia and had arrived in Malaysia for a port visit. When the 31st MEU leadership received news of the tsunami, they initiated an immediate recall of all personnel who were away from the ship on liberty. The ship quickly took on some supplies, and in less than 24 hours was underway to Japan where it would meet up with USS Germantown and USS Harpers Ferry.

Germantown and Harpers Ferry were both in Indonesia with elements of the 31st MEU embarked. Marines and sailors aboard Harpers Ferry were scheduled to participate in a large humanitarian assistance and disaster relief exercise starting 12 March. Both ships were immediately alerted upon news of the disaster in Japan and headed north for the stricken country in support of what would become Operation Tomodachi.

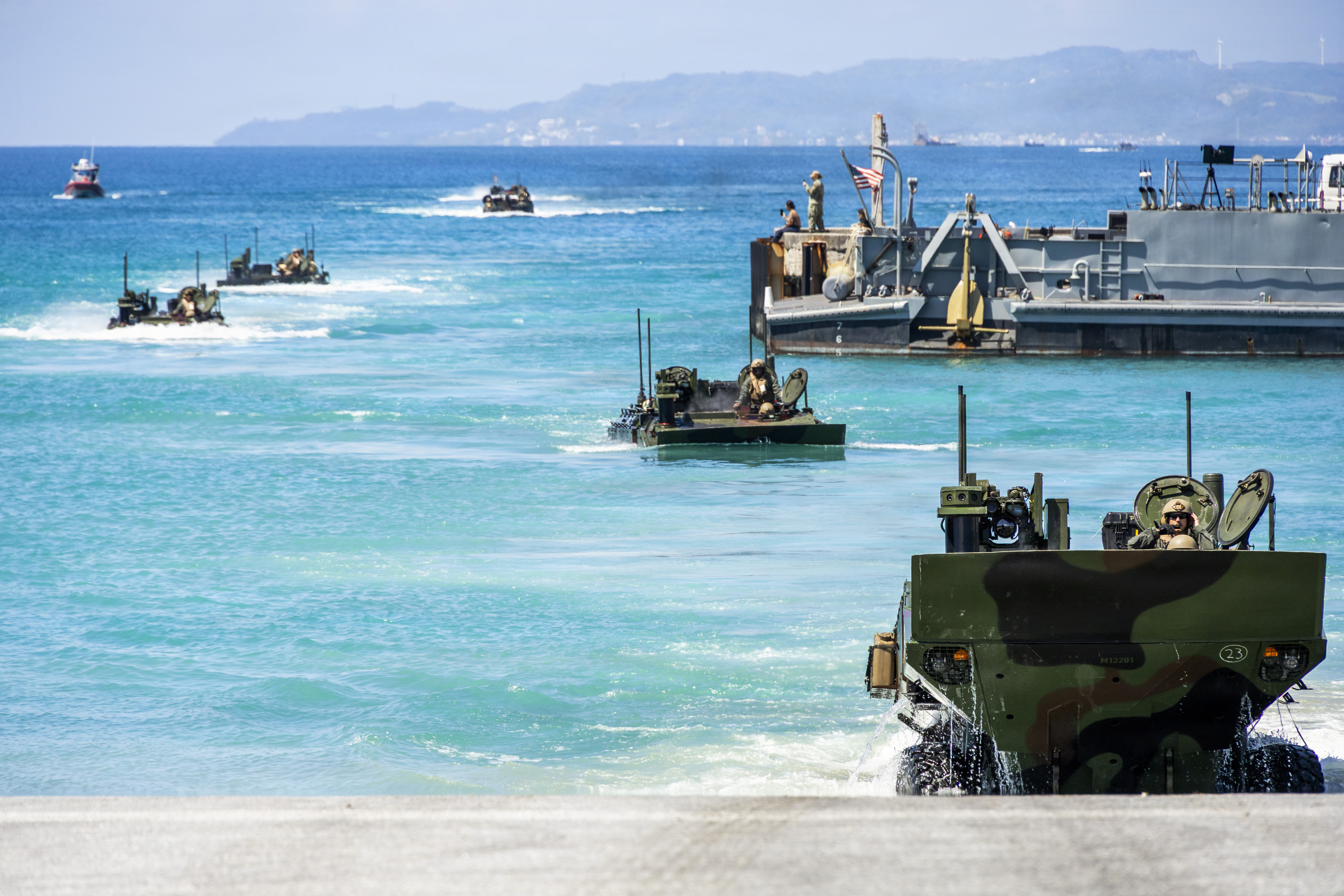
Amphibious Combat Vehicles with the 31st Marine Expeditionary Unit, III Marine Expeditionary Force, arrive at White Beach Naval Facility, Okinawa, Japan, July 23, 2026.

On 17 March, the Essex Amphibious Ready Group and the 31st MEU arrived off the coast of Akita, Japan, and began flying coastal surveillance flights in the initial stages of Operation Tomodachi. On 22 March, the ARG repositioned off the east coast of Japan, near Hachinohe, and the 31st MEU immediately began delivering relief supplies ashore via helicopters of Marine Medium Helicopter Squadron 262 (Reinforced). Supplies delivered included water, blankets, and other health and comfort items. HMM-262 (REIN) conducted a total of 15 survey missions and 204 supply delivery missions, with nearly 300 hours of flight time. On 27 March, the MEU and Essex ARG's priority became support to the isolated island of Oshima as part of Operation Tomodachi. Elements of the 31st MEU, including Marine Medium Helicopter Squadron 262 (Reinforced), Combat Logistics Battalion 31, 2nd Battalion 5th Marines and the command element went ashore on Oshima Island to remove debris, deliver critical supplies to the isolated area, and provide life support. Combat Logistics Battalion 31 began by transporting relief supplies, which included moving commercial electric utility vehicles, a fuel truck, a water re-supply vehicle and civilian workers from the Tohoku Power Company by U.S. Navy landing craft, to attempt to restore partial power to the cut-off island. The same day the utility vehicles were delivered, the island received power for the first time since the disaster. During the Oshima operation, pallets of clothes, blankets, and food were flown to the JMSDF helicopter destroyer JS Hyūga by Marine helicopters, where they were distributed to displaced residents of the island who were temporarily embarked aboard the ship.

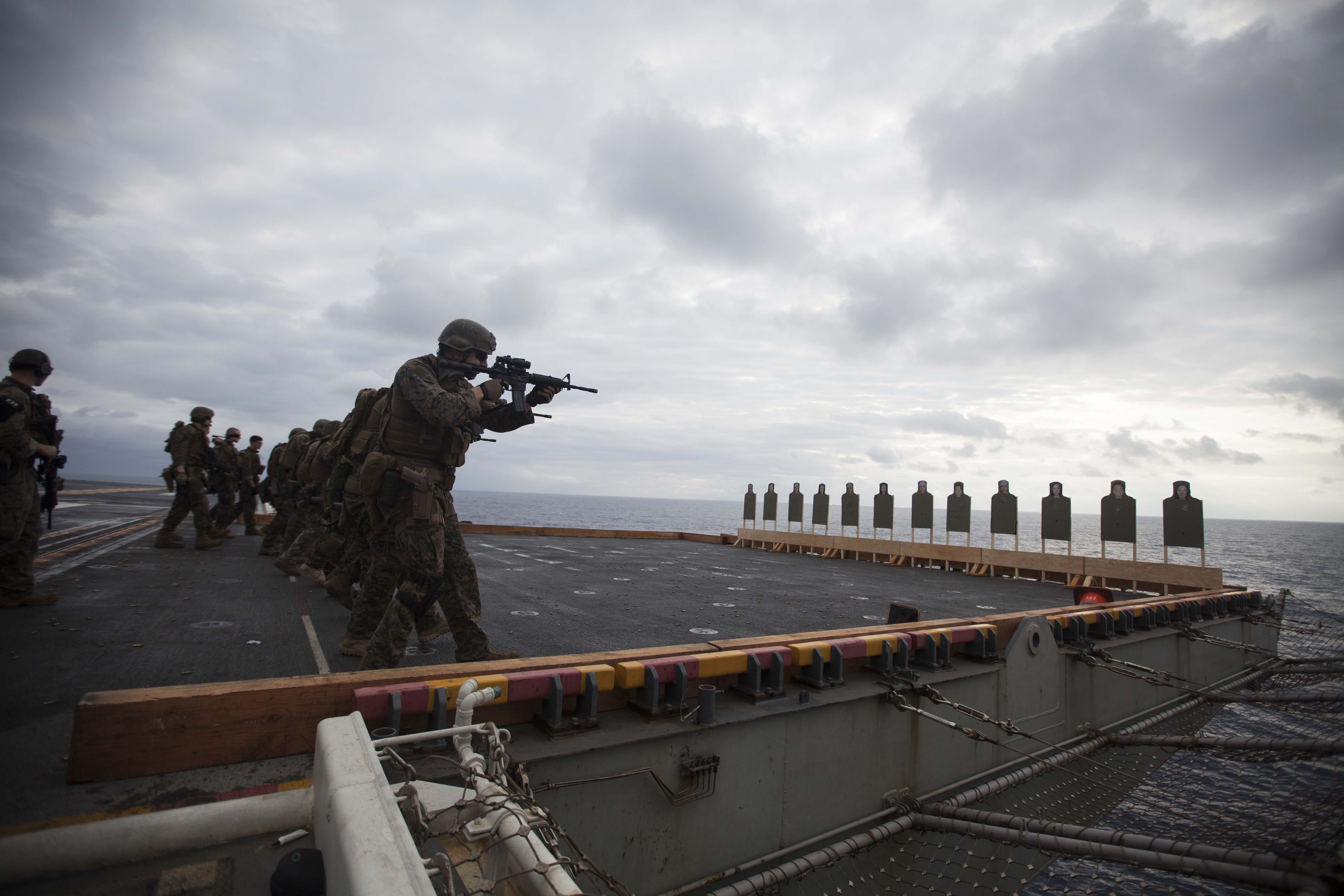
Marines and sailors with the Maritime Raid Force, 31st Marine Expeditionary Unit, approach and engage paper targets during a live fire exercise on the flight deck of USS Bonhomme Richard

Working alongside the JGSDF, the 31st MEU delivered 15,000 pounds (6,800 kg) of supplies to the island and cleared tons of debris from harbors, roads and beaches. Marines created temporary shower facilities allowing residents to bathe. For some, it was the first time they had been able to take a shower since the tsunami struck. In total, the 31st MEU and the Essex ARG moved 164,000 pounds (74,000 kg) of relief supplies to those affected by the disaster, including five cities, Oshima Island and the Japanese ship.

==== Typhoon Haiyan and Operation Damayan – 2013 ====
In November 2013, the 31st MEU acted as a contingency reserve in wake of Typhoon Haiyan in the Republic of the Philippines. The MEU was conducting unit turnover when they were tasked to respond and quickly embarked aboard USS Ashland and Germantown of Amphibious Squadron 11 to assist in disaster relief operations in conjunction with the U.S. Department of State and Joint Task Force 505. The Aviation Combat Element of the 31st MEU, Marine Medium Tiltrotor Squadron 265, flew over 415 flight hours to deliver aid supplies throughout the region. The rest of the MEU remained at sea in the Leyte Gulf of the Philippines to act as a contingency reserve in the event any more assistance was needed, or another disaster were to strike the area.

==== South Korean ferry Sewol – 2014 ====
In April 2014, the 31st MEU on board USS Bonhomme Richard assisted in air-sea search and rescue operations of the South Korean ferry Sewol that "sank near the island of Jindo off the southwestern coast of the Republic of Korea 16 April".

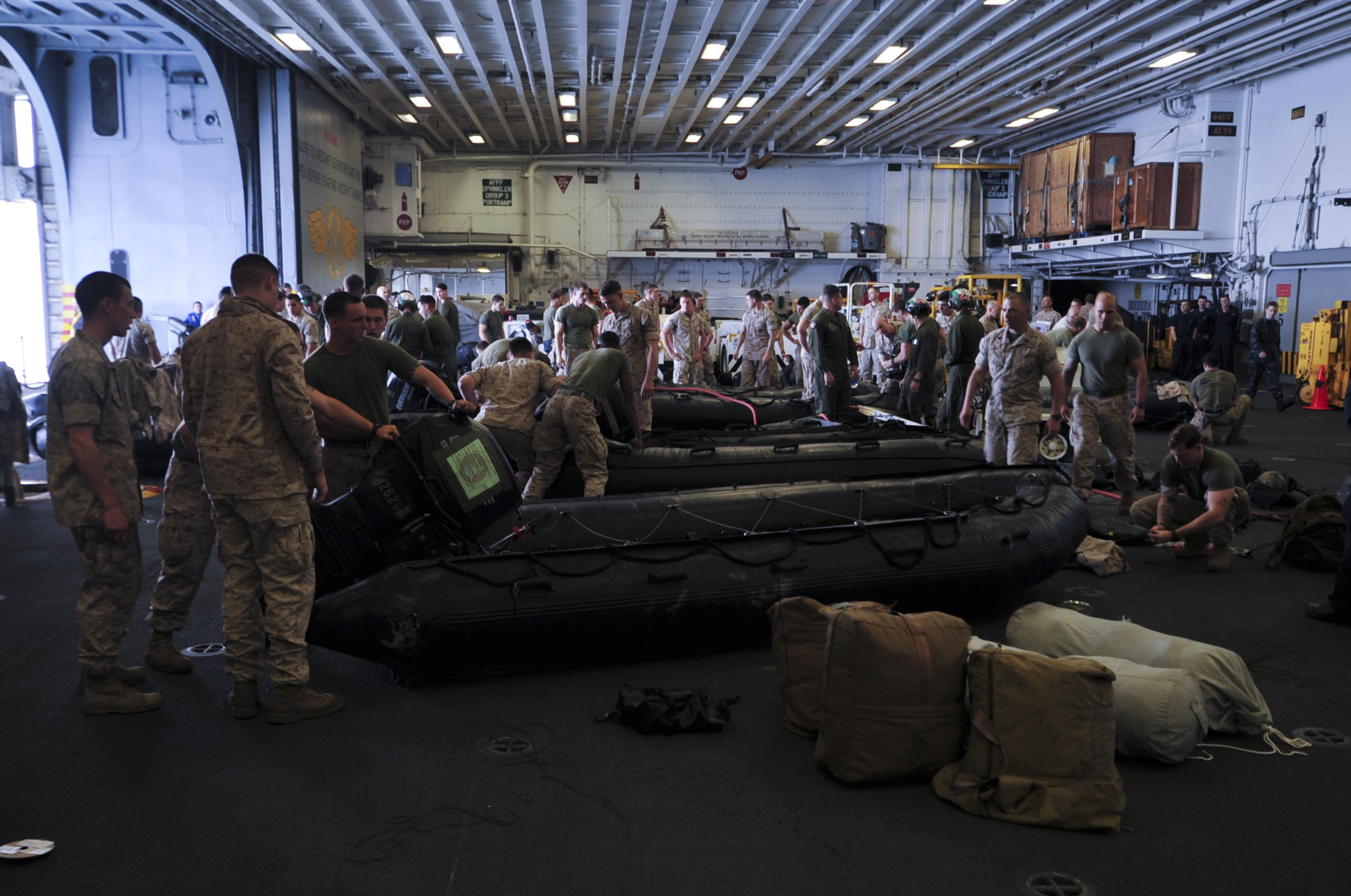
US Marines assigned to the 31st MEU responding to the scene of Korean passenger ship Sewol that sank on 16 April 2014

==== Typhoon Soudelor, Saipan – 2015 ====
From 2–3 August 2015, Typhoon Soudelor devastated the island of Saipan in the Commonwealth of Northern Mariana Islands. Approximately 600 Marines and sailors of the 31st MEU responded to assist local and federal agencies with disaster relief efforts. Over two weeks, the 31st MEU delivered more than 19,000 US gallons (72,000 L) of water and 47,000 individual meals provided by the Federal Emergency Management Agency to five distribution sites across the island.

The Marines distributed an additional 366,000 gallons of potable water to the people of Saipan, 279,000 US gallons (1,060,000 L) of which were purified using a Lightweight Water Purification System and a Tactical Water Purification System. The 31st MEU also distributed more than 10,000 pounds (4,500 kg) of emergency supplies provided by the Red Cross.

==== Operation Chinzei, Japan – 2016 ====
From 15 to 17 April 2016, a series of earthquakes struck the Japanese prefecture of Kumamoto, causing 48 deaths and displacing some 100,000 people. At the request of the Government of Japan, approximately 130 Marines and sailors of the 31st MEU provided support to operations conducted by Joint Task Force Chinzei, led by the Japan Self-Defense Force. From 18 to 23 April, 31st MEU MV-22B Ospreys operating out of Marine Corps Air Station Iwakuni, Japan, delivered more than 82,000 pounds (37,000 kg) of food, water, blankets, toiletries and other items to be distributed to earthquake victims.

==== Defense Support of Civil Authorities, Commonwealth of the Northern Mariana Islands, September–November 2018 ====
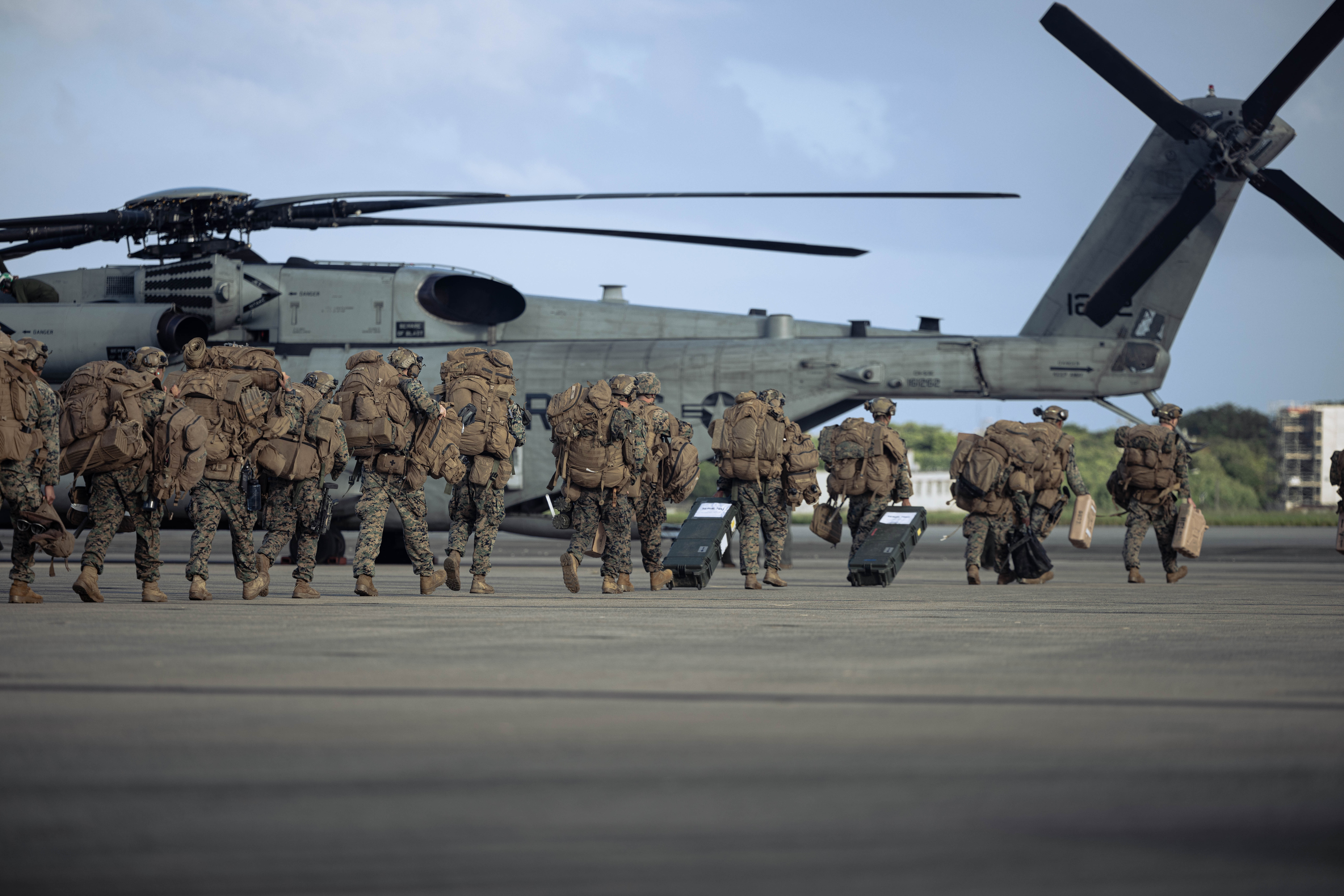
Marines with the 31st Marine Expeditionary Unit board a VMM-265 (Rein.) CH-53E Super Stallion for flight operations at MCAS Futenma, Okinawa, 26 September 2025

During Fall Patrol 2018, the 31st MEU and CLB-31 provided assistance to the people of the Commonwealth of the Northern Mariana Islands (CNMI), a U.S. territory, after two devastating typhoons. On 10 September, Super Typhoon Mangkhut swept across CNMI, causing widespread damage to the islands of Rota and Saipan. The Marines and sailors of the 31st MEU and CLB-31, embarked aboard USS Wasp and Ashland, began providing assistance to CNMI officials and the Federal Emergency Management Agency (FEMA) as soon as the skies cleared over CNMI. During Mangkhut relief efforts, the 31st MEU and CLB-31, partnering with Amphibious Squadron 11, cleared roads and flew 63 air missions to deliver assistance personnel and more than 29,000 pounds (13,000 kg) of cargo for the people of CNMI. Mangkhut relief efforts ended on 14 September, when the 31st MEU and CLB-31 re-embarked aboard Wasp and Ashland to continue deployment.

Just over a month later, on 25 October, the second-strongest storm ever to hit U.S. soil, Super Typhoon Yutu, made a direct hit on the islands of Tinian and Saipan. The 31st MEU and CLB-31, which had just returned to Okinawa after completing deployment, received orders to assist relief efforts just days after returning to Camp Hansen. The 31st MEU arrived on 29 October, establishing ashore at Tinian International Airport.

A more robust follow-on force arrived aboard Ashland on 3 November, aiding with water purification, route clearance, damage assessments and restoration of municipal utilities. All told, the 31st MEU and CLB-31, which led the multiservice response effort on Tinian, cleared miles of roadway, purified more than 20,000 US gallons (76,000 L) of drinking water, and helped deliver and assemble more than 150 FEMA-provided shelters, handing control of the DSCA effort to the U.S. Navy Seabees of Naval Mobile Construction Battalion 1 on 14 November.

==== Guam and Papua New Guinea – 2023–2024 ====
In May 2023, the 31st MEU responded to Typhoon Mawar, which struck Guam as a Category 4 storm. Marines assisted with defense support of civilian authorities (DSCA) and base restoration, clearing debris across Naval Base Guam, Marine Corps Camp Blaz, and Anderson Air Force Base. Later that year in August 2023, the unit conducted humanitarian assistance and disaster relief (HADR) operations on Bougainville Island, Papua New Guinea, following volcanic activity.

==== Japan and Philippine Sea – 2025–2026 ====
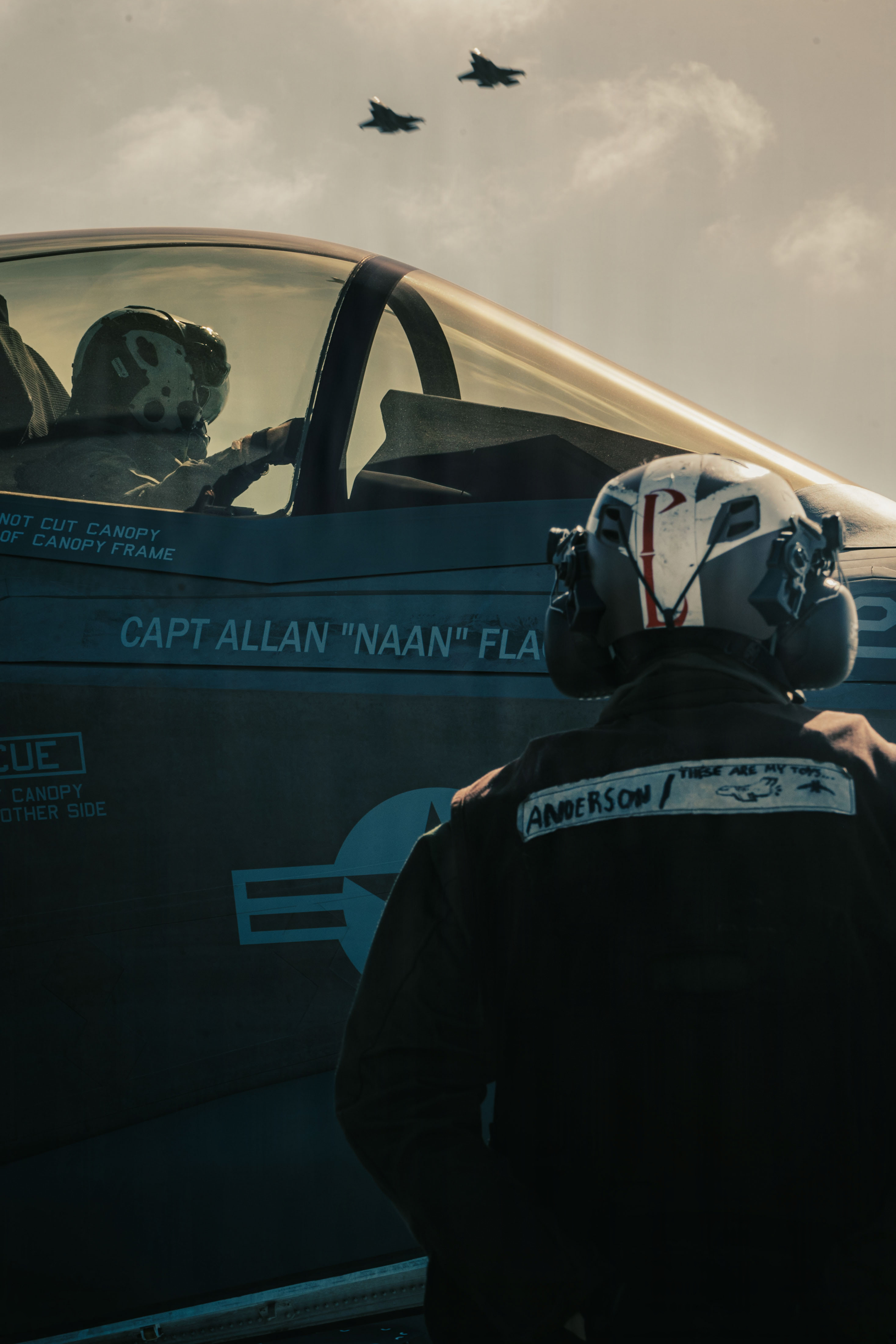
A U.S. Marine Corps F-35B Lightning II assigned to Marine Fighter Attack Squadron (VMFA) 242, 31st Marine Expeditionary Unit, prepares to take off aboard the forward-deployed amphibious assault carrier USS Tripoli (LHA 7), Dec. 7, 2025.

In late 2025, the MEU transitioned its primary aviation operations from USS America to USS Tripoli. This shift allowed the unit to execute advanced Expeditionary Advanced Base Operations (EABO), including a rapid power projection drill in which roughly 400 Marines were transported 1,100 miles (1,800 km) from Okinawa to Camp Fuji in under 36 hours. To conclude the year, the MEU integrated with the aircraft carrier USS George Washington to support anti-submarine warfare operations in the Philippine Sea using MV-22B Ospreys.

From February to March 2026, the 31st MEU, along with the 3rd Marine Expeditionary Brigade, trained alongside the Japan Ground Self-Defense Force's (JGSDF) Amphibious Rapid Deployment Brigade and 3rd Amphibious Rapid Deployment Regiment for Exercise Iron Fist 26. This 20th bilateral iteration supported interoperability through complex training, including ship-to-shore movements aboard Tripoli, field exercises, simulated amphibious assaults, close air support, and urban operations. The training featured comprehensive air, ground, and sea exercises, including an amphibious landing on Tanegashima Island.

==== 2026 Iran war ====
On 13 March 2026, during the 2026 Iran war, elements of the 31st MEU aboard Tripoli were reportedly ordered to deploy to the U.S. Central Command area of responsibility in the Middle East. They are expected to try to secure the Strait of Hormuz amid the 2026 Strait of Hormuz crisis.

On 19 April 2026, President Trump announced that the US had attacked the Iran-flagged cargo ship Touska after it attempted to breach the US naval blockade of Iran, blowing a hole in its engine room and taking the ship into custody. The vessel, almost 900 feet (270 m) long, was en route to Bandar Abbas. It was warned by the guided missile destroyer USS Spruance over a six-hour period before the destroyer fired several rounds from its 5-inch/54-caliber Mark 45 gun into the engine room, disabling it. It was then seized by the 31st MEU in the Gulf of Oman. Iran described the seizure as a US-Iran truce violation. Iran retaliated against the seizure by launching attack drones at U.S. ships, although no damage was reported. According to Reuters, the seized ship was probably carrying equipment that the US considered "dual-use," meaning that it had equipment that could be used by the Iranian army.

== 31st MEU commanding officers ==
Col. Walter Lee Miller Jr. May 2004-June 20, 2006	Col. John L. Mayer 20 June 2006 – 15 June 2008
Col. Paul L. Damren 16 June 2008 – 17 June 2010	Col. Andrew R. MacMannis 18 June 2010 – 1 June 2012
Col. John E. Merna 2 June 2012-May 20, 2014	Lt. Col. G. Troy Roesti 21 May 2014 to 9 June 2014
Col. Romin Dasmalchi 9 June 2014 – 20 May 2016	Col. Tye R. Wallace 20 May 2016-June 2018
Col. Robert Brodie June 2018-June 25, 2020	Col. Michael Nakonieczny 26 July 2020-June 2022
Col. Matthew C. Danner June 2022 - May 2024	Col. Chris P. Niedziocha June 2024 – 4 August 2026
Col. Jason R. Laird 5 August 2026 – Present	

== Unit awards ==
A unit citation or commendation is an award bestowed upon an organization for the action cited. Members of the unit who participated in said actions are allowed to wear on their uniforms the awarded unit citation. The 31st Marine Expeditionary Unit has been presented with the following awards:

Streamer	Award	Year(s)	Additional Info
	Presidential Unit Citation Streamer	1967	Vietnam
	Navy Unit Commendation Streamer with three Bronze Stars	1968, 1998, 2001–2003, 2004–2005	Vietnam, Western Pacific, Iraq
	Meritorious Unit Commendation Streamer with two Bronze Stars	1975, 1983, 1998–2000	Vietnam, Lebanon
	Marine Corps Expeditionary Streamer	1983	Lebanon
	National Defense Service Streamer with two Bronze Stars	1961–1974, 1990–1995, 2001–2022	Vietnam War, Gulf War, war on terrorism
	Vietnam Service Streamer with two Silver and four Bronze Stars	April 1967–March 1973, March - April 1975	Vietnam
	Global War on Terrorism Expeditionary Streamer	2004–2005	Iraq
	Global War on Terrorism Service Streamer	2001–2021	Iraq
	Vietnam Gallantry Cross with Palm Streamer	1967–1970	Vietnam

== See also ==
- Marine Air-Ground Task Force
- List of Marine Expeditionary Units
- Organization of the United States Marine Corps
