= Andrew Reynolds Smith =

- Born: May 1966 (age 59); Cornwall, England
- Occupation: Business executive
- Title: Former CEO, Smiths Group
- Term: September 2015 - May 2021
- Predecessor: Philip Bowman
- Successor: Paul Keel

Andrew Reynolds Smith (born May 1966) is a British business executive. He was the chief executive officer (CEO) of Smiths Group from September 2015 to May 2021. He succeeded Philip Bowman, who retired after eight years in charge.

== Early life ==
Andrew Reynolds Smith was born in May 1966. He worked as an apprentice at Texas Instruments. He has a PhD in mechanical engineering. In his late teens he was an avid cyclist, competing in tournaments across Europe. He grew up sailing in southwest England.

== Career ==
Smith joined GKN in 2002, rising to CEO of GKN Automotive. He became a main board director in June 2007.

== Other roles ==
Reynolds Smith is a former chairman of the CBI Manufacturing Council, and a former member of the Ministerial Advisory Group for Manufacturing. He is a former non-executive director of Morgan Advanced Materials.

He is a supporter of the Macmillan cancer research charity.
