= Transition Assistance Program =

The Transition Assistance Program (TAP) is a U.S. Department of Defense (DoD) led program that provides information and training to ensure service members transitioning from active-duty are prepared for their next step in life - whether pursuing additional education, finding a job in the public or private sector, or starting their own business.

Every year, approximately 200,000 men and women leave U.S. military service and return to life as civilians, a process known as the military to civilian transition.

The Transition Assistance Program (TAP) provides information, tools and training to ensure service members and their spouses are prepared for the next step in civilian life.

Military to civilian transition occurs within a complex and dynamic network of relationships, programs, services, and benefits, which includes transition planning and assistance efforts by individual Service branches, the interagency TAP partnership, and community resources delivered through local government, private industry, and nonprofit organizations.

In addition to the Military Departments, TAP is the result of a partnership between the Departments of Defense (DoD), Labor (DOL), Veterans Affairs (VA), Homeland Security (DHS), Education (ED), the U.S. Office of Personnel Management (OPM) and the U.S. Small Business Administration (SBA).

The mandatory components of TAP are applicable for all service members, including National Guard and Reservists transitioning or being released from active duty, after serving 180 continuous days or more in accordance with Title 10, United States Code, Chapter 58.

== History ==
For the first 150 years of our nation's history, the government delivered veterans’ benefits and incidental medical care after military service, but largely left service members to navigate their transition on their own. After World War I, Congress established a new system of benefits that included disability compensation and insurance for service members and veterans. During World War II, the government implemented the Servicemen's Readjustment Act of 1944, commonly known as the original GI Bill®.

Over the next four decades, this “bundle of benefits” approach to transition assistance gave transitioning service members and their families support. In the early 1990s, as the U.S. again faced a massive demobilization of the military due to planned post-Cold War reduction that coincided with the end of the Gulf War, Congress recognized the need for a different approach to transition assistance.

The FY 1991 NDAA authorized a program of comprehensive transition assistance counseling for separating service members and their spouses.

In 2011, the Veteran unemployment rate was 12.1 percent, considerably higher than the non-Veteran unemployment rate of 8.7 percent.

This was fueled by the lingering effects of the 2008 global economic crisis along with unique employment challenges faced by Post-9/11 Veterans. Congress responded to this multifaceted crisis by passing the Veterans Opportunity to Work (VOW) to Hire Heroes Act of 2011, which was signed by President Barack Obama on November 21, 2011.

In addition to pre-separation counseling, the Act mandated participation of all eligible transitioning Service members in the previously optional TAP employment, benefits, and job training assistance sessions.

In response to the VOW Act, interagency partners redesigned TAP into a cohesive, modular, outcomes-based program that standardized transition opportunities, services, and training to better prepare the nation's Service members to achieve their post military career goals.

Since the VOW Act, the interagency partners, along with other federal agencies, continue to expand transition assistance support based on the ever changing needs of transitioning service members and their families.

The John S. McCain National Defense Authorization Act for Fiscal Year 2019 (FY19 NDAA) became public law on August 13, 2018. The bill authorized many changes to the Department of Defense (DoD) Transition Assistance Program (TAP), to be implemented in 2019. The purpose of the program will remain the same, however the TAP process reflected its new requirements beginning October 1, 2019.

== Military-Civilian Transition Office ==
The Military-Civilian Transition Office, formerly the Transition to Veterans Program Office, merged with the Office of Reintegration Programs, the policy office responsible for the Yellow Ribbon Reintegration Program in January 2020.

MCTO provides policy and program oversight for the Transition Assistance Program (TAP) and the Yellow Ribbon Reintegration Program (YRRP).

MCTO's mission is to continually improve the delivery of resources, information, and assistance provided through the programs, promoting their effective and efficient support of transitioning Service members and members of the National Guard and Reserve, their families, and communities worldwide.

The office ensures transitioning Service members are able to successfully return to their civilian life while also addressing the challenges National Guard and Reserve Service members and their families face as they prepare for and return from deployment or mobilization.

The current Director of MCTO is Tamre Newton. Former directors include Karin Orvis, Ph.D. and Susan Kelly, Ph.D.

MCTO's parent organization is the Defense Personnel and Family Support Center.

== DoDI 1332.35 ==
On September 26, 2019, the DoD issued an update to the previously released (February 29, 2016) Department of Defense Instruction 1332.35 for The Transition Assistance Program for Military Personnel.

== Transition Assistance Curriculum Core Components ==
TAP starts no later than 365 days prior to transition for those who are separating or retiring. It is recommended retirees begin the transition process at least two years prior to retirement. In the event of an unanticipated separation or retirement, or a member of the Reserve Component is demobilized with less than 365 days, TAP must begin as soon as possible within the remaining period of service.

=== Individualized Initial Counseling ===
Individualized Initial Counseling between the service member and a TAP counselor is now the official start to the transition process. During the IC session, service members complete their personal self-assessment and begin the development of their Individual Transition Plan (ITP) to identify their unique needs of the transition process and post-transition goals.

=== Pre-separation Counseling ===
Once the individualized IC is complete, pre-separation counseling commences. Pre-separation counseling, just like IC, must start no later than 365 days prior to transition. Pre-separation counseling covers by-law information to include benefits, entitlements and resources for eligible transitioning service members. Caregivers and spouses are especially encouraged to attend pre-separation counseling with their service member.

=== The DoD Transition Day ===
The DoD Transition Day follows pre-separation counseling, and is mandatory for transitioning service members.

- Managing Your (MY) Transition—provides service members with an understanding of the importance of preparing for their transition from military service into the civilian sector and provides an overview of the Transition Assistance Program curriculum. The “less obvious” topics of transition, such as personal and family transition concerns, the differences in the culture of civilian and military workplaces, transition-related stressors, and the importance of effective communication during the transition process are introduced. The course concludes with the presentation of both military and civilian resources that can provide support during and after transition to ensure a successful transition experience for military personnel and their family members.
- Military Occupational Code (MOC) Crosswalk—demonstrates how to translate military skills, training, and experience into civilian credentialing appropriate for civilian jobs. Service members will document their military career experience and skills, translate their military occupation experience to civilian sector occupations and skills, and identify any gaps in their training and/or experience that need to be filled to meet their personal career goals.
- Financial Planning for Transition—builds on the financial training provided during the military life cycle and helps service members understand how transition will impact their financial situation by discussing the change in income, taxes, healthcare costs, new expenses, and other financial changes related to transition. Online tools are used to calculate the military-to-civilian income equivalent and to research the cost-of-living for at least two geographical locations. Throughout the course, service members have the opportunity to develop or update a spending plan.

=== VA Benefits and Services ===
VA Benefits and Services is a one-day interactive briefing designed to enable transitioning Service members (TSMs) to make informed decisions regarding the use of VA benefits. The program supports each TSM to better understand VA benefits and programs based on their needs and where they are in their transition journey. It is designed around the understanding that no two transitions are the same. Each module builds upon the prior modules and highlights real stories and examples from Service members who have already transitioned from military to civilian life. Critical areas covered include: disability benefits and compensation; memorial and burial benefits; education and economic support; housing benefits; and health care options, including both physical and emotional health needs.

=== Department of Labor Employment Fundamentals of Career Transition ===
The Department of Labor Employment Fundamentals of Career Transition lays the foundation of the transition from military to civilian life. This workshop provides an introduction to the essential tools and resources needed to evaluate career options, gain information for civilian employment, and understand the fundamentals of the employment process.

=== Service Member Elected Tracks ===
The TAP also include a service member election of two-days of instruction; these include the: DOL Employment Track, DOL Vocational Track, DoD Education Track, and the Small Business Administration Entrepreneurship Track. Transitioning service members must elect at least one track, but may attend more than one based on their ITP and post-transition goals.

=== Capstone ===
The Capstone event, which is the culminating event where commanders verify achievement of career readiness standards and a viable ITP, must happen no later than 90 days before separation or released from active duty. Capstone remains the culminating event for TAP.

== Career Readiness Standards ==
The Career Readiness Standards (CRS) are a set of common and specific standards and associated products, based on service member-determined goals that must be achieved to demonstrate that the service member is prepared to pursue post-separation goals. These standards capitalize upon the skills and experience Service members have gained during military service and are aligned to employment or technical training and education competency areas.

- Complete a personal self-assessment/Individual Transition Plan
- Register on eBenefits
- Complete a Continuum of Military Service Opportunity counseling (Active-component only)
- Prepare a criterion-based, post-separation financial plan
- Complete a MOC Gap Analysis or provide verification of employment
- CRS for DoD Education and DOL Vocational Tracks: Complete a comparison of higher education or technical training
- CRS for DOL Employment Track: Complete a completed resume or provide verification of employment

All CRS are verified by a service member's commander prior to transition. If a service member doesn't meet their CRS, there is a warm handover to an interagency partner for additional assistance.

== Discontinuance of Transition (Goals, Plans, Success) Name for TAP Curriculum ==
On September 30, 2019, the DoD Transition to Veterans Program Office announced that the Transition Assistance Program curriculum would no longer be referred to as Transition GPS (Goals, Plans, Success) or TGPS. The name TGPS was established after President Obama signed the Veterans Opportunity to Work (VOW) Act of 2011, which spurred the evolution of transition assistance and prompted the federal government to address veteran unemployment by preparing transitioning service members for post-separation careers.

There is no new formal name for the TAP curriculum, it is simply called the transition assistance curriculum, or TAP curriculum.

Dropping the GPS from the name of the TAP curriculum was formally decided on by the TAP interagency Curriculum Working Group, the body responsible for updating, reviewing and modifying the transition assistance curriculum.

== eForm and Enterprise Database ==
In November 2016, TAP released an eForm and Enterprise Database. The new eForm combines the three previous forms that service members used in their transition process into one electronic version. It is more streamlined and efficient, and there is no need for service members to collect wet signatures from their counselors and commanders.

The Enterprise Database provides real-time access and visibility for commanders across all branches of service. This allows for a smooth transition for service members who might be separating from the military while stationed at an installation that is not their military branch.

== Program Evaluation ==
The success of TAP is evaluated in multiple ways:

- TAP Curriculum Participant Assessment - After completing portions of the TAP curriculum, service members and spouses can participate in assessments in order to provide feedback on the program.
- Military Installation Site Visits - Installation visits are conducted to assess curriculum delivery and TAP processes with Service members and TAP counselors/commanders.
- Outcome measures and outcome Indicators - The US Department of Defense collaborates with the U.S. Department of Veterans Affairs, The U.S. Department of Labor, and the U.S. Small Business Administration to track a variety of measures/indicators indicating career readiness, educational outcomes and employment outcomes for Service members and veterans. For example, OSD and the Services track the percentage of Service members with VOW eligible separations who met CRS and completed specific statutory requirements included in the 2011 VOW To Hire Heroes Act prior to their separation, retirement, or release from active duty.

Based on this feedback received through the program evaluation process, the program is assessed and modified annually to ensure overall effectiveness and excellence.

== Online Curriculum ==
Service members receive the curriculum at key touch points throughout their Military Life Cycle (MLC). This allows service members the time within their military career to plan for their transition to the civilian world. Most importantly, it provides the resources to assist them in planning and aligning their military career goals with their civilian career goals. All Transition GPS modules are available to spouses during the Service member's transition planning.

All modules are delivered by the Military Services and partnering agencies at installations in a classroom setting. The curriculum is also available online 24/7 via Joint Knowledge Online.

Service members: If you are a service member and need official Transition Assistance Program credit/certification for Transition GPS courses, take the courses online via Joint Knowledge Online (JKO) (CAC required)

Veterans and Family Members: If you are a veteran or family member, you can take Transition GPS courses (without credit/certification) online via JKO (no CAC requirement)
