= 2006 Southern Leyte mudslide =

Major landslide in the Philippines

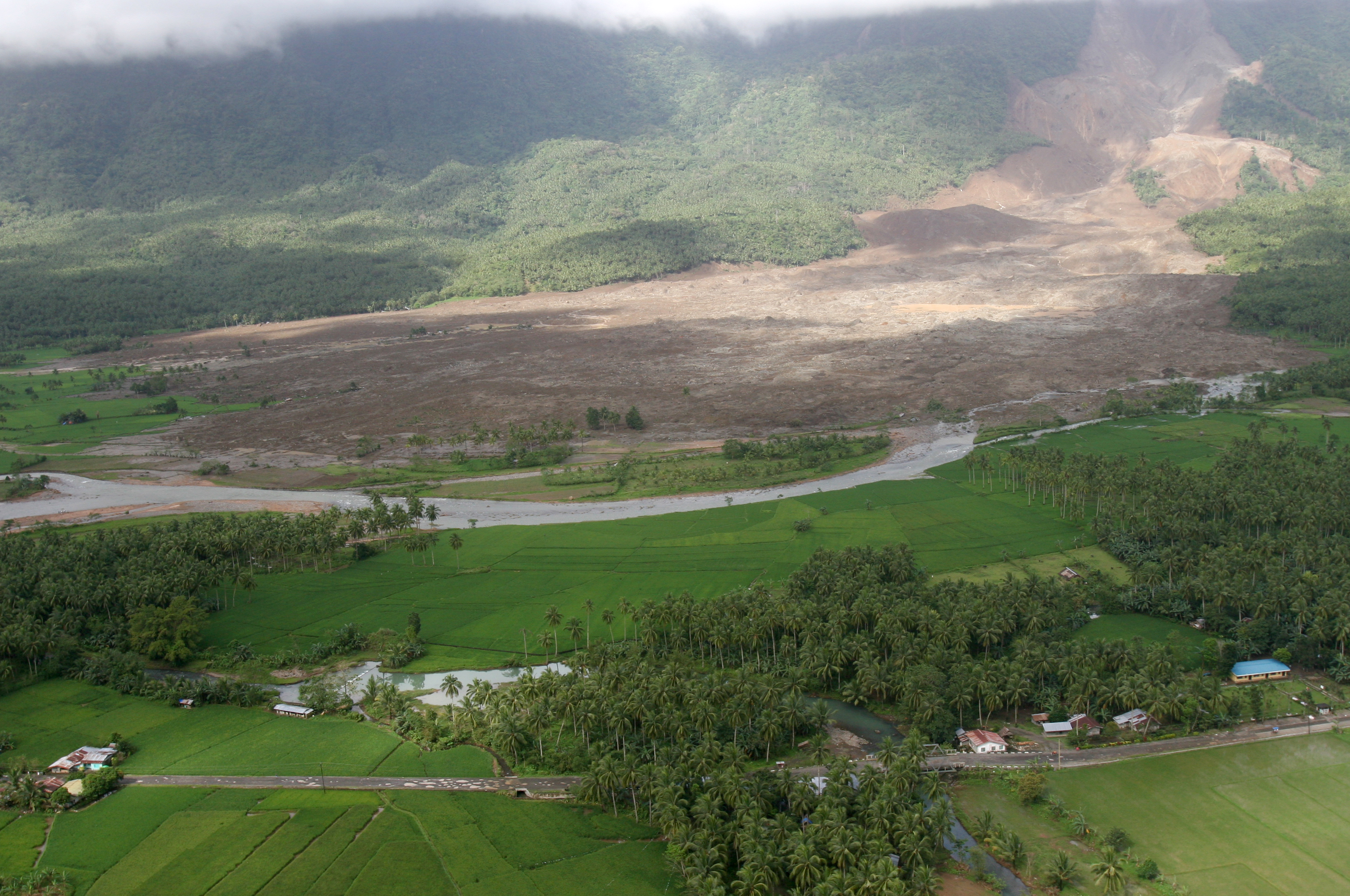
- View of the Southern Leyte rockslide-debris avalanche toe
- Date: February 17, 2006
- Time: 10:30 UTC+08:00
- Location: Guinsaugon, Saint Bernard, Southern Leyte, Philippines; 10°20′15″N 125°05′51″E
- Deaths: 1,126

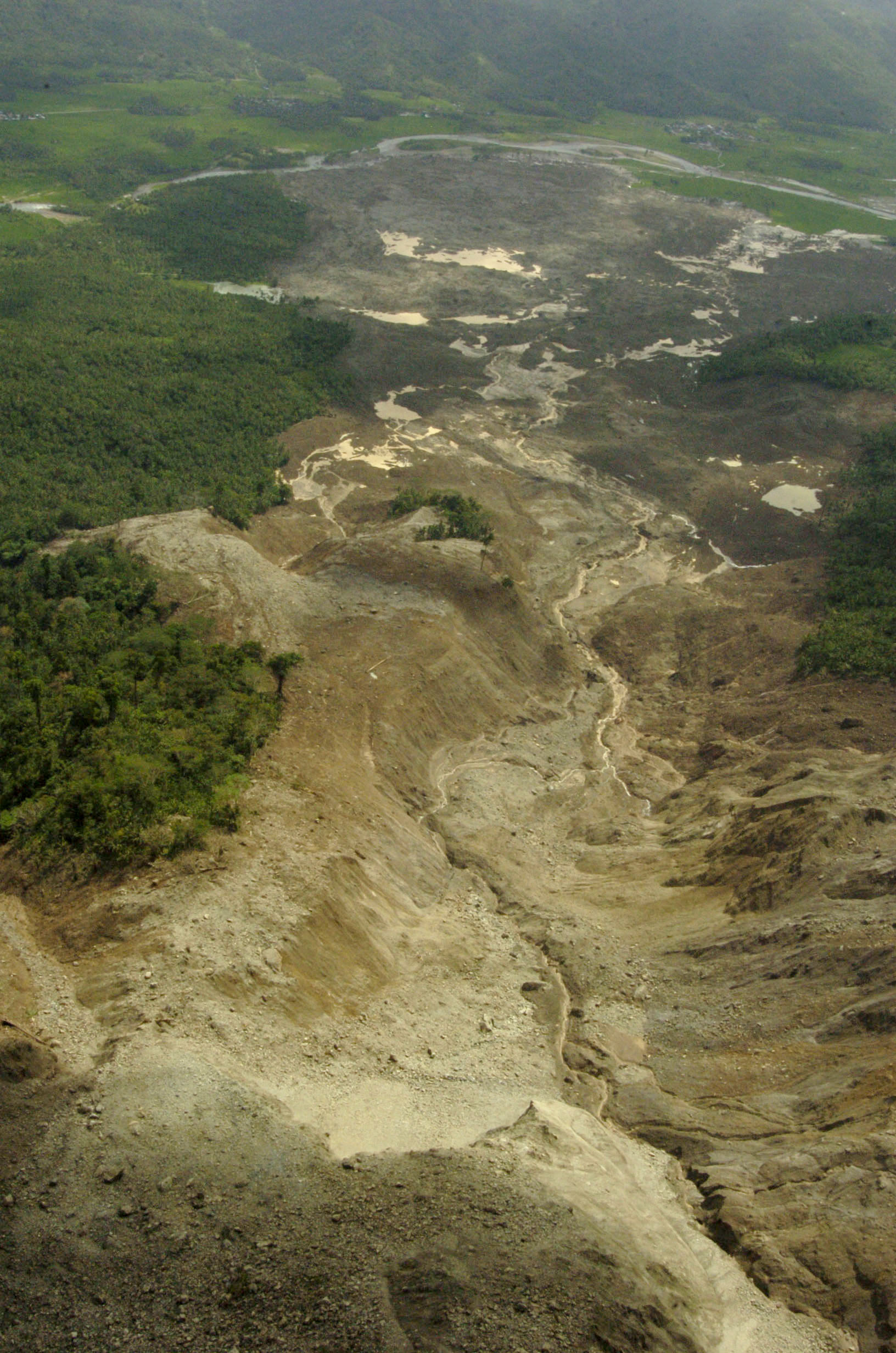
View of the Southern Leyte rockslide-debris avalanche body from the landslide crown. Distance to the toe is approximately 4 km.

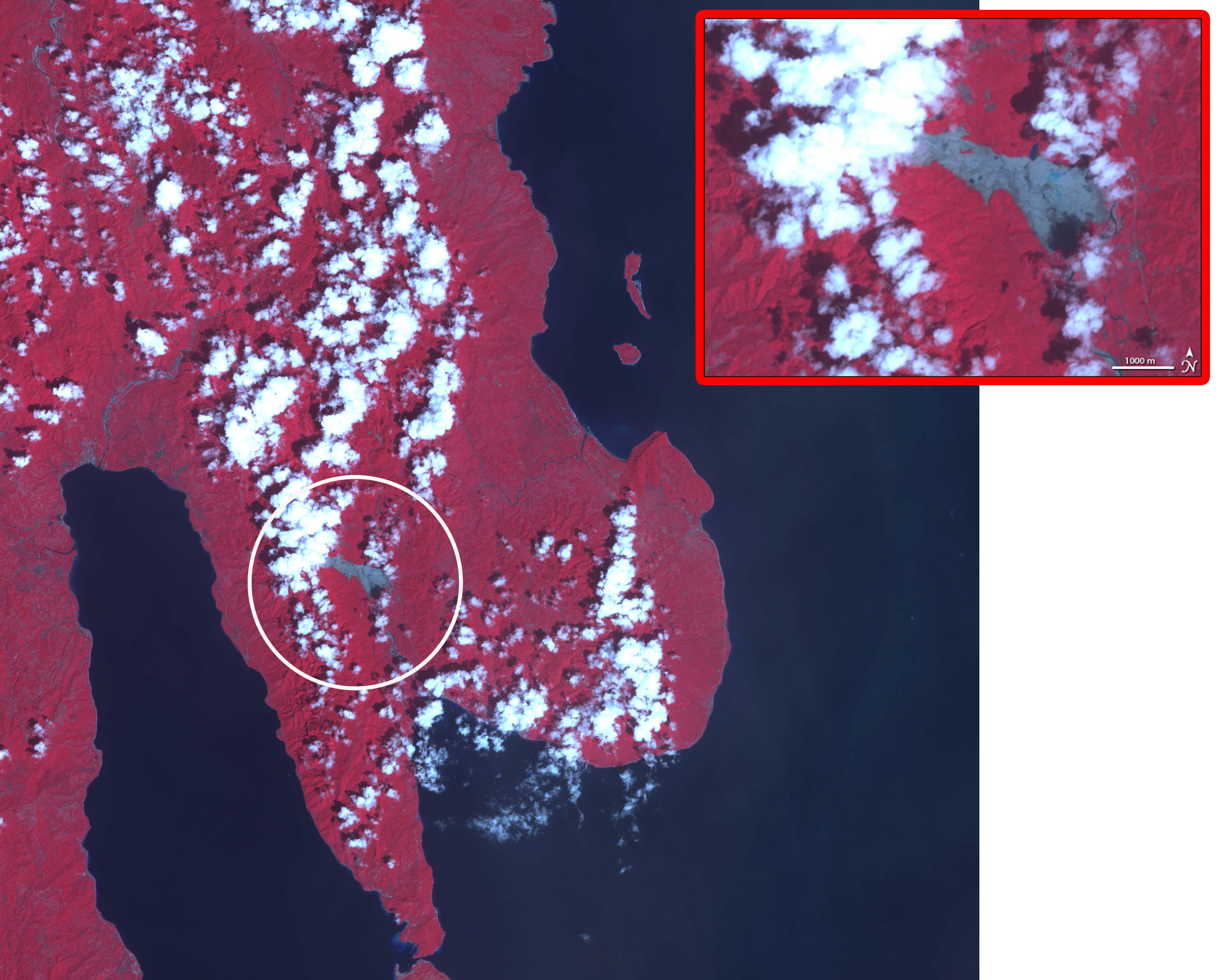
Advanced Spaceborne Thermal Emission and Reflection Radiometer (ASTER) on NASA's Terra satellite with this view of the landslide that buried a town.

On February 17, 2006, a massive rock slide-debris avalanche occurred in the Philippine province of Southern Leyte, causing widespread damage and loss of life. The deadly landslide (or debris flow) followed a 10-day period of heavy rain and a minor earthquake (magnitude 2.6 on the moment magnitude scale). The official death toll was 1,126.

== Overview ==
At around 10:30 on February 17, 2006, a cliff face of a ridge straddling the Philippine Fault collapsed in a combination rockslide-debris mass movement event, translocating and subsequently burying Guinsaugon village in the township of Saint Bernard. Up to ten smaller landslides had occurred within the previous week in the vicinity of St. Bernard, but Guinsaugon was the worst-hit community.

Among the worst of the tragedies was the burial of the local elementary school, located nearest to the mountain ridge, as the landslide occurred when school was in session and full of children. Provincial Governor Rosette Lerias said at the time the school had 246 students and seven teachers; only a child and an adult were rescued immediately after the disaster transpired. About 80 women who participated in the celebration of the fifth anniversary of the Guinsaugon Women's Health Association were also lost in the landslide.

Lerias said that although several residents had left the area the week before due to the fear of landslides, several returned when the rains had eased.

== Rescue and relief ==
Rescue teams including military personnel proceeded to the affected areas. However, relief efforts were hampered by rain, chest-deep mud, roads blocked by boulders, washed-out bridges, and lack of heavy equipment. A minor earthquake in the morning of February 17 also affected the relief operation as the ground remained unstable.

President Gloria Macapagal Arroyo gave an address on television stating that "help is on the way". Navy and coast guard ships were dispatched to the coastal area.

On February 17, Philippine National Red Cross chairman Richard J. Gordon who was then in Geneva, Switzerland, attending a board meeting of the International Red Cross and Red Crescent Movement appealed for international assistance. He raised US$1.5 million to help the victims of the mudslides. The funds were used to purchase tents, blankets, cooking utensils, mosquito nets, temporary shelter materials, hygiene articles, water purification tablets and medicines. US$152,000 was released to provide initial assistance. A relief plane was flown into the region carrying emergency trauma kits, rubber boots, ropes, clothing, flashlights and medicine. Three Philippines National Red Cross teams with search and rescue dogs were at the site to provide assistance, with others joining soon afterward. The Red Cross said that it feared that the death toll would be high.

The United States sent three naval vessels, the USS Curtis Wilbur, USS Essex, and USS Harpers Ferry with the 31st Marine Expeditionary Unit, to the area to provide assistance.

About 6,000 U.S. Army and Marine Corps troops were in the Philippines for an annual bilateral exercise. The US government also donated $100,000 worth of disaster equipment to the Philippine National Red Cross. USAID turned over 29 million pesos (about $560,000) worth of food and non-food items.

Other countries donated or pledged assistance to the Philippine government. China offered a donation of $1 million in cash and material. Australia also offered AU$1 million ($740,000) in immediate relief. Taiwan pledged enough medicine to treat 3,000 people for a month and a half along with $100,000. Thailand also pledged $1 million. Malaysia sent a 60-man search-and-rescue and medical assistance team, the Special Malaysia Disaster Assistance Team (SMART). Spain, through a non-government organization, the Unidad Canina de Rescate y Salvamento, sent a six-man rescue team equipped with five sniffer dogs to aid in the relief and rescue efforts. South Korea promised $1 million. New Zealand sent $133,000 to be used in future rescue operations. Singapore said, according to a statement from Prime Minister Lee Hsien Loong, that officials would help the Arroyo administration in any way possible. Indonesia and Turkey offered humanitarian contingents as well.

The Philippine National Red Cross reported that 53 persons were rescued from the mud on February 17, but the rescue efforts had to be suspended at nightfall for safety reasons.

== Possible causes ==
Congressman Roger Mercado of Southern Leyte claimed in a Reuters interview that logging and mining done in the area three decades ago was the main culprit. Dave Petley, professor at the International Landslide Centre, Durham University, told the BBC that the causes Mercado mentioned, if proven true, created a "dangerous combination" that produced a "classic landslide scenario".

However, local government officials and eyewitnesses claimed anecdotally that the area was "well forested" and the governor's office said that deforestation from mining and logging activities were not the causal factor, although no scientific evidence was presented to back the claims. The governor’s office did not explain why the soil was so unstable at the time of the slide, after millennia of stability.

Experts did agree that torrential rains lasting two weeks before the mudslide were the tipping point that precipitated the disaster. Rainfall amounting to nearly 1,200 millimetres (47 in) over the period of February 4–14 loosened the soil so much that the resulting sludge and rocks thundered down the slopes of nearby Mount Can-abag, virtually disintegrating it. The La Niña weather phenomenon was blamed for the non-stop rains that occurred in the province. San Francisco, Agusan del Sur mayor Carie Ladernora declared the state of calamity on her town by February 12, 2006.

The Philippine Institute of Volcanology and Seismology recorded a magnitude 2.6 earthquake in Southern Leyte just prior to the landslide although the effects of this are unclear.

=== 2008 workshop ===
After two years, the international geoscience community including experts from Japan, Canada, United States, Sri Lanka, New Zealand, Hong Kong, UK, Taiwan and the Philippines, came together in Tacloban and St. Bernard to examine known information on the Guinsaugon disaster. In addition, the workshop was tasked with determining the next steps after the disaster. The landslide is classified as a rock slide-debris avalanche using the Varnes (1978) or Cruden and Varnes (1996) classification. Volume estimates in recent publications range between 14 MCM (million cubic metres) and 20 MCM, converging on or about 15 MCM. There is general accord among scientists that high precipitation a week prior to the failure contributed to the conditions at failure, but the 5 day delay between the rain and the landslide, and the fact that Southern Leyte regularly gets high overall levels of precipitation means that the precise nature of that contribution is unknown. Similarly, the role of minor ground shaking that occurred at about the same time is still uncertain. "Was the landslide caused by ground shaking or excessive rain? This is one of the things that is not yet resolved." said Dr. Mark Albert Zarco, a professor at the Department of Engineering Sciences, University of the Philippines Diliman in a news story. Importantly, the geological and geomorphological history of the slope including, for example, the prominent strike-slip movement of about 2.5 cm per year, has ultimately lead to failures all along the scarp, including the one that buried Guinsaugon. Richard Guthrie, of University of Waterloo, Canada, stated: "We have had very large rains and we have had very large earthquakes in the past; The rocks have been stretched and strained. As time moves on, the rock begins to age and die and finally it collapses. The important thing is that we’re able to know the preconditioning of the slopes." Scientists built a synthesis paper on the landslide and a set of recommendations regarding the next steps for the Philippines in relation to landslide hazards.

== May 2006 mudslide ==
Due to Typhoon Chanchu (Philippine name: Caloy), flash floods and mudslides isolated at least 11 barangays in Sogod, Southern Leyte. No casualties were reported.

== In popular culture ==
Footage taken during helicopter rescues after the mudslide was featured in an episode of the American reality television series, World's Most Amazing Videos.

== See also ==
- List of landslides
- Tropical Storm Thelma (Uring, 1991)
- Typhoon Haiyan (Yolanda, 2013)
