= Walter Lee Miller Jr. =

United States Marine Corps general

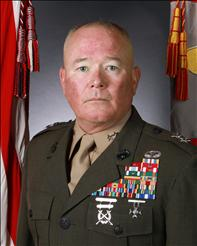
- U.S. Marine Corps Major General Walter Lee Miller Jr.
- Education: Texas A&M
- Military career
- Allegiance: United States of America
- Branch: United States Marine Corps
- Service years: 1979–2017
- Rank: Major General
- Commands: II Marine Expeditionary Force; 31st Marine Expeditionary Unit; Battalion Landing Team, 2nd Battalion, 2nd Marines; UNITAS Rifle Company
- Conflicts: Iraq War; War in Afghanistan
- Awards: Navy Distinguished Service Medal; Defense Superior Service Medal; Legion of Merit (2); Bronze Star Medal; Defense Meritorious Service Medal; Meritorious Service Medal (2)

Major General Walter Lee Miller Jr. is a retired senior officer in the United States Marine Corps.

== Military career ==
=== 1979-1991 ===
Miller graduated from Texas A&M University and was commissioned a 2nd lieutenant in December 1979 via the Naval Reserve Officer Training Corps program. He completed The Basic School (TBS) and Infantry Officer's Course in October 1980 and was assigned to B Company, 1st Battalion, 3rd Marines. There he served as commander for both rifle and weapons platoons, as well as the B Company Executive Officer. He was later assigned to the battalion's operations section completing his tour in October 1983. His next assignment was to TBS where he held both Staff Platoon Commander and tactics instructor billets from 1983 to 1986.

Following this assignment he was ordered to the Amphibious Warfare School (AWS) where he graduated with honors, as well as being chosen as the ground honor graduate, earning the Captain Larry K. Shipman award.

Following AWS he returned to the operating force in 1987 until 1991, and was assigned as C Company Commander in 1st Battalion, 6th Marine Regiment. During this tour he deployed to Okinawa and later to the Republic of Panama in support of Freedom of Movement in the Canal Zone under Marine Forces Panama. He also served as the Regiment's Assistant Operations Officer and later as Commander of the UNITAS Rifle Company. Following his return from UNITAS he was sent to Incirlik, Turkey as a liaison officer in support of Provide Comfort.

=== 1992-2003 ===
Miller's next assignment was to Plans, Policies, and Operations; Special Operations and Low Intensity Conflict; Headquarters Marine Corps from 1991-1994. He then was sent to Command and Staff College, Quantico, Virginia. Following Command and Staff College, he was assigned to Marine Forces South Liaison Element in the Republic of Panama from 1995-1998. There he served as the G5, later as the G3 and finally as the Officer In Charge.

Following Panama, Brigadier General Miller returned to Second Marine Division in 1998 until 2003. During this tour he served as the G3 Operations Officer, 2nd Marine Regiment's Executive Officer and finally as Commanding Officer of Battalion Landing Team 2nd Battalion, 2nd Marine Regiment (BLT 2/2). During BLT 2/2's deployment, they participated in operations in Kosovo, Djibouti and finally went ashore in March 2003 in support of Operation Iraqi Freedom I.

Upon completion of this tour with 2nd Battalion, 2nd Marine Regiment he was posted as the Chief of Staff of 4th Marine Division in 2003.

=== 2004-2010 ===
He then was ordered, in 2004, to report to III Marine Expeditionary Forces, Marine Forces Pacific in order to take command of 31st Marine Expeditionary Unit (MEU) and again was deployed to Iraq for Operation Iraqi Freedom II where the MEU took charge of the AO Denver (Western Al Anbar) Operating Area. Upon return the MEU was deployed in a humanitarian aid/disaster relief mission to Leyte, the Philippines, to support efforts following their disastrous mountain mud slide.

In 2006 Miller was assigned as the Assistant Chief of Staff of United States European Command and held that billet until reassignment to Headquarters, Marine Corps Combat Development Command in 2008. He served as Director of the Joint Capabilities Assessment and Integration Directorate, the Marine Corps representative to the Joint Capabilities Board. In June 2009, he was assigned as the Director of Capabilities Development Directorate.

=== Present ===
Major general Walter Lee Miller Jr. retired from the active service on July 14, 2017 at Camp Lejeune, North Carolina, after a 38-year Marine Corps career. He was decorated with Navy Distinguished Service Medal at his retirement ceremony.

== Awards and decorations ==
Millers' decorations and medals include:

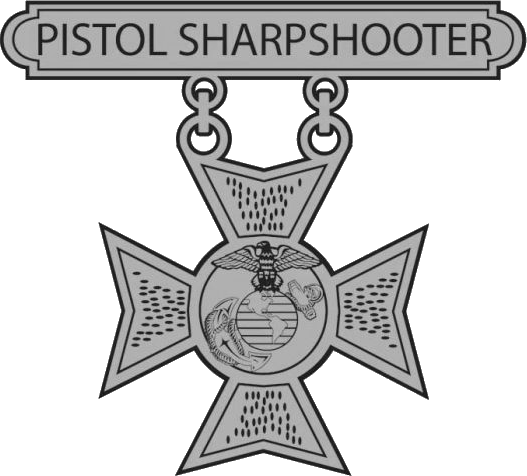

Basic Parachutist Badge
Defense Superior Service Medal with one bronze oak leaf cluster		Legion of Merit with gold award star	Bronze Star Medal with Combat "V"
Defense Meritorious Service Medal	Meritorious Service Medal with gold award star	Navy Commendation Medal with gold award star	Navy Achievement Medal
Navy and Marine Corps Presidential Unit Citation	Joint Meritorious Unit Award with two oak leaf clusters	Navy Unit Commendation	Navy Meritorious Unit Commendation
Marine Corps Expeditionary Medal	National Defense Service Medal with service star	Armed Forces Expeditionary Medal	Southwest Asia Service Medal with service star
Iraq Campaign Medal with service star	Global War on Terrorism Expeditionary Medal	Global War on Terrorism Service Medal	Korea Defense Service Medal
Humanitarian Service Medal	Sea Service Deployment Ribbon with eight service stars	Navy and Marine Corps Overseas Service Ribbon	NATO Medal for Kosovo
Rifle Expert Badge		Pistol Sharpsshooter Badge	

Miller has a master's degree in Curriculum Design.

== Personal life ==
Miller is married to the former Marcela Davila and has three daughters and four grandchildren.
