= Philip Bowman =

Australian businessman (born 1952)

- Born: Philip Bowman; 14 December 1952 (age 73); Australia
- Education: Westminster School; Pembroke College, University of Cambridge
- Occupation: Businessman
- Years active: 1973–present
- Title: Former CEO, Smiths Group
- Term: 2007 to 2015

Philip Bowman (born 14 December 1952) is an Australian businessman. He was the chief executive officer (CEO) of Smiths Group, a British multinational diversified engineering company, from 2007 to 2015.

== Early life ==
Born in Australia, he was educated at Westminster School and earned a degree in natural sciences from Pembroke College, University of Cambridge.

== Career ==
He started at Price Waterhouse in 1974. From 1985 to 1995 he worked for brewer Bass, rising to finance director, then chief executive of Bass Retail. From 1995 to 1996, he was finance director at retailer Coles Myer in Australia, leaving after he blew the whistle on a fellow executive who had diverted company funds to buy shares in a company he controlled. From 1998 to 2005 he worked for Allied Domecq in the UK, rising to CEO in 1999, and oversaw the sale of the group to Pernod Ricard in 2006. In 2007, he was appointed as CEO of Scottish Power. He oversaw the sale of the group to Spain's Iberdrola December 2007, and was then appointed as CEO of Smiths Group.

He has been a non-executive director of Burberry since June 2002. He was previously chairman of Liberty and Coral Eurobet, and a non-executive director of Scottish & Newcastle and British Sky Broadcasting.
