= Andrew Smith (columnist) =

American columnist and editor

Andrew Smith is an American columnist and editor, best known as “Captain Comics,” a columnist on comic books and pop culture for newspapers and websites, currently syndicated by Tribune Content Agency. He has also maintained an online discussion board about comics and pop culture since 1998.

Smith became a newspaper writer and editor in 1981, but went national when the comics and pop culture column “Captain Comics” launched in January 1992 at The Commercial Appeal newspaper in Memphis, Tennessee, where it was syndicated by the newspaper's sister organization, Scripps Howard News Service. The column became independent of the newspaper in 1994. SHNS was bought out by McClatchy-Tribune Information Services in 2013 which was then bought by Tribune Content Agency in 2014, where the column remains today.

He launched a self-created message board in 1998 answering questions and entertaining discussions about comics throughout history and pop culture. The site has continued online in one form or another until the present, where it is located at captaincomics.ning.com as the “Captain Comics Round Table”.

Smith became a Contributing Editor at Comics Buyer's Guide newspaper (later magazine) in 2000, writing the “Dear Cap” column, answering reader questions, analyzing trends and running reviews, interviewing comics creators and writing commentary. His column began in CBG #1394 (July 21, 2000) and ran in every issue until the last issue of CBG, #1699 (March 2013).

He has also contributed essays to scholarly books on comics and pop culture. “J. Jonah Jameson – Hero or Menace? Spider-Man’s Nemesis Hard to Pigeonhole” appeared in Web-Spinning Heroics: Critical Essays on the History and Meaning of Spider-Man in 2012. “Supervillains Who Needs Superheroes (Are the Luckiest Villains in the World)” appeared in What Is a Superhero? in 2013. A third essay, "Jack Kirby: The Not-So-Secret Identity of the Thing," was published in Working-Class Comic Book Heroes: Class Conflict and Populist Politics in Comics in 2018. He currently has a book contract with McFarland & Co. Publishers to explore the use of journalism in U.S. comic books, 1938 to present.

Smith was also the Chairman of the Memphis Fantasy Convention from 1983 to 1985.

== Published works ==
- Smith, Andrew A. (2012). "J. Jonah Jameson – Hero or Menace? Spider-Man's Nemesis Hard to Pigeonhole". In Peaslee, Robert Moses; Weiner, Robert G. (eds.). Web-Spinning Heroics: Critical Essays on the History and Meaning of Spider-Man. McFarland & Co., Publishers. pp. 90–100.
- Smith, Andrew A. (2013). "Supervillains Who Love Superheroes (Are the Luckiest Villains in the World)'. In Rosenberg, Robin S.; Coogan, Peter. What Is a Superhero? Oxford University Press, Publisher. pp. 101–106.
- Smith, Andrew A. (2018) "Jack Kirby: The Not-So-Secret Identity of the Thing". In DiPaolo, Marc. Working-Class Comic Book Heroes: Class Conflict and Populist Politics in Comics. University of Mississippi Press, Publisher. pp. 191–204.
