= Andrew Smith (Australian footballer) =

Australian rules footballer

Personal information
- Born: 28 August 1960 (age 66)
- Original team: Watsonia
- Height: 180 cm (5 ft 11 in)
- Weight: 73 kg (161 lb)

Playing career^{1}
Years	Club	Games (Goals)
1980–1984	Collingwood	35 (8)
1985	Sydney Swans	4 (1)
Total		39 (9)
- ^{1} Playing statistics correct to the end of 1985.

Andrew Smith (born 28 August 1960) is a former Australian rules footballer who played with Collingwood and the Sydney Swans in the Victorian Football League (VFL).

Smith, a defender, was recruited from Watsonia. He played just once in 1980, his debut year, but in 1981 was a regular fixture in the Collingwood team, making 18 appearances, including two finals. A dislocated shoulder, suffered during Collingwood's semi-final win over Fitzroy, cost him his spot in the side and ultimately a grand final. Smith played 11 games in 1982 and added only five more games over the next two seasons and made the move to Sydney. His only appearances for Sydney were in the opening four rounds of the 1985 VFL season. He then joined Brunswick.
