= Andrew Smith (journalist and non-fiction writer) =

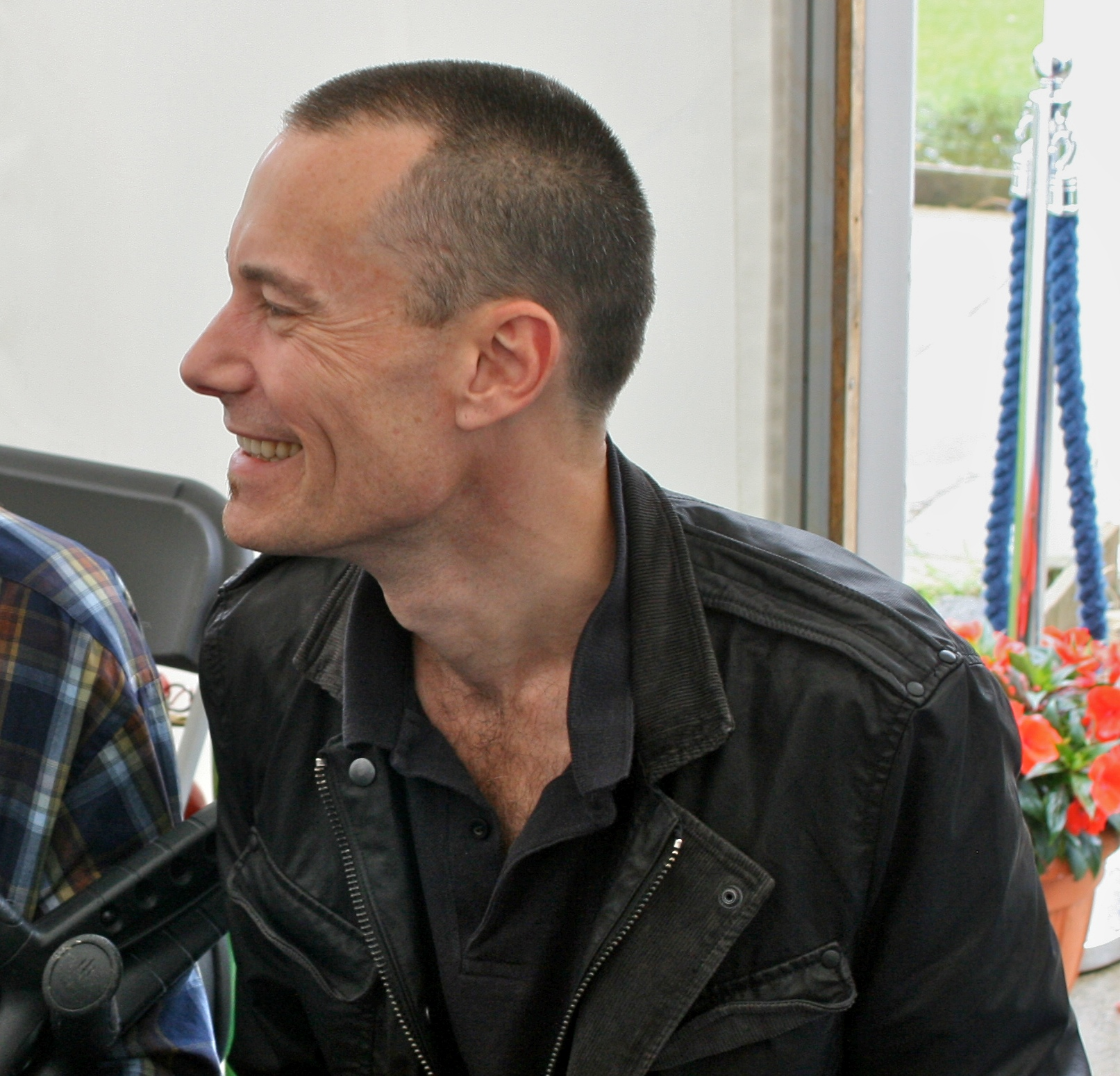
Andrew Smith

Andrew Smith (born 10 February 1961) is an American-born British journalist and nonfiction writer. He lives in New York.

== Career ==
Smith is the author of Totally Wired: on the Trail of the Great Dotcom Swindle, which tells the story of Josh Harris's role in the birth of the World Wide Web and subsequent dotcom bubble in New York at the end of the 1990s.

Smith also wrote Moondust: In Search of the Men Who Fell to Earth, in which he travels across America in search of the nine surviving U.S. astronauts who walked on the Moon between 1969 and 1972.

His next book Devil in the Stack: Searching for the Soul of the New Machine, was published in 2024.

Smith has made two documentaries for BBC Four. The first, Being Neil Armstrong, is a trip across America to explore the personal history of the first person on the Moon. The second, To Kill a Mockingbird at 50, about how Monroeville, Alabama, has changed since it was used by Harper Lee as the setting for her 1960 novel.

Smith has written for The Guardian since 2000.
