= Andrew Smith (entomologist) =

Canadian entomologist

Andrew B. T. Smith
- Scientific career
- Fields: Entomology, coleopterology
- Workplaces: Canadian Museum of Nature
- Author abbrev. (zoology): Smith

Andrew B. T. Smith is a Canadian entomologist at the Canadian Museum of Nature who specialises in the taxonomy of beetles, particularly the Scarabaeidae. He was president of the Coleopterists Society from 2019 to 2020.

== Career ==
Smith led the Biological Survey of Canada from 2007 to 2009. He is an adjunct research associate professor at the University of Nebraska–Lincoln and an adjunct research associate at the University of Kansas. He served as president of the Coleopterists Society from 2019 to 2020 and is a subject editor for Zootaxa and The Canadian Entomologist. Smith is also a contributing editor for BugGuide.net.

== Collaborators ==
Smith has collaborated with many fellow Canadian coleopterists including Robert S. Anderson, Stephen Marshall, Stewart B. Peck, and Jarmila Kukalová-Peck. He also has long-running collaborations with many Cuban entomologists to help document Cuba's beetle diversity.

== Selected publications ==
Smith has published a number of key papers in the field of Coleopterology, especially on North American and South American species.

- Smith, A. B. T. (2003). "Checklist of the Scarabaeoidea of the Nearctic Realm". Version 3. Electronically published, Lincoln, Nebraska. 74 pp.
- Smith, A. B. T.; Skelley, P. E. (2007). "A review of the Aphodiinae (Coleoptera: Scarabaeidae) of southern South America". Zootaxa. 1458: 1–80.
- Bouchard, P.; Grebennikov, V. V.; Smith, A. B. T.; Douglas, H. (2009). "Biodiversity of Coleoptera". In Foottit, R. G.; Adler, P. H. (eds.). Insect Biodiversity: Science and Society. Oxford: Blackwell.
