= Andrew Smith (admiral) =

Rear-Admiral Andrew Mark Smith is a former Royal Canadian Navy officer. Smith was the former Chief of Military Personnel and Chief of Transformation, until retiring in 2013 to move to a senior role with Public Works and Government Services Canada.

== Military career ==
=== Chief of Transformation ===
Following his tenure as CMP, Smith was appointed Chief of Transformation. In this role, he would be the senior military leader responsible for the Defence Renewal Plan.

== Awards and decorations ==
Smith's personal awards and decorations include the following: (Ribbons centre)

Ribbon	Description	Notes
	Order of Military Merit (CMM)	Appointed Commander (CMM) on 27 September 2011; Appointed Officer (OMM) on 3 October 2001
	South-West Asia Service Medal	with AFGHANISTAN Clasp
	Queen Elizabeth Diamond Jubilee Medal	Decoration awarded in 2012; Canadian version
	Canadian Forces' Decoration (CD)	with two Clasp for 32 years of services

== Post-military career ==
In June 2013, Smith announced he was retiring from the military and would be appointed as the Associate Assistant Deputy Minister (Real Property) at Public Works and Government Services Canada (PWGSC).
