= Chief of Military Personnel =

Senior officer of the Canadian Armed forces

Chief of military personnel
- Reports to: Chief of the Defence Staff
- Appointer: Chief of the Defence Staff
- Website: Official website

The chief of military personnel (CMP) is the senior Canadian Armed Forces officer responsible for the military's human resource programs. As a "level one" organization, the CMP reports directly to the chief of the Defence Staff.

== Responsibilities ==
As the senior officer responsible for the military's human resources, the CMP is responsible for ensuring the military can deliver "the right person, in the right place, at the right time". These include:

- Education and training
- Pay
- Benefits
- Pension
- Health services
- Casualty support
- Alternate dispute resolution
- Return to Work Program
- Transition Assistance Program (TAP)
- Recovery, rehabilitation and reintegration
- Dependent education
- Member Assistance Program
- Operational trauma stress support centres
- Programs for ill, injured and deceased
- Chaplain general
- Honours and recognition
- History and heritage
