= Andrew Phillip Smith =

British writer (born 1966)

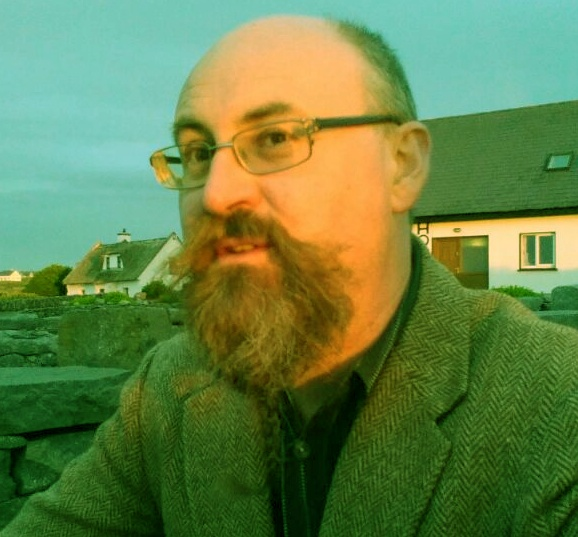
Andrew Phillip Smith, writer

Andrew Phillip Smith (born 1966) is a Welsh writer who has written books on Gnosticism, Cathars and Mandaeans.

== Biography ==
He grew up in Penarth, south Wales and attended the University College of Wales, Swansea. He has also lived in London and then in rural California and now lives in Cadoxton, Vale of Glamorgan with his wife.

He also runs the Bardic Press, publishers of Hafiz, Omar Khayyam, Early Christianity, Celtic Mythology, Fourth Way, is the editor of the magazine The Gnostic: A Journal of Gnosticism, Western Esotericism and Spirituality.

He has been interviewed several times about his writing, by Fortean Times in March 2010, by Zany Mystic, by Spinx Radio. and several times by Miguel Conner on Aeon Byte, He has contributed articles to New Dawn Magazine, Fortean Times and Mind, Body Spirit published by Watkins Publishing.

== Bibliography ==
His published works include:

- The Gospel of Thomas: A New Version Based On the Inner Meaning (Ulysses Books, 2002)
- The Gospel of Philip – Annotated & Explained (Skylight Paths, 2005)
- The Lost Sayings of Jesus: Teachings from Ancient Christian, Jewish, Gnostic, and Islamic Sources – Annotated & Explained (Skylight Paths, 2006)
- Gnostic Writings on the Soul – Annotated & Explained (foreword by Stephan A. Hoeller) (Skylight Paths, 2007)
- The Gnostics: History - Tradition - Scriptures - Influence (Watkins Publishing, 2008, EPUB 2012)
- A Dictionary of Gnosticism (Quest Books, 2009).
- The Secret History of the Gnostics: Their Scriptures, Beliefs and Traditions (preface by Monty Oxymoron) (Watkins Publishing, 2015, EPUB 2015)
- The Lost Teachings of the Cathars: Their Beliefs and Practices (Watkins Publishing, 2015, EPUB 2015)
