= Islamic Reconciliation Party =

- Secretary-General: Jasem Shadidzadeh Tamimi
- Presidium: January 9, 2003
- Founded: 1999
- Banned: November 4, 2006
- Headquarters: Ahvaz, Iran
- Ideology: Reformism; Arab nationalism
- Religion: Islam

Islamic Reconciliation Party or Al-Wefaq Islamic Party (Persian: حزب وفاق اسلامی, Arabic: حزب الوفاق الاسلامي) formerly named Reconciliation Committee (Arabic: لجنةالوفاق; Lejnat Al-Wefaq), was an Iranian local ethnic party associated with Arab minority in Khuzestan Province.

The party had candidates shared with the Islamic Iran Participation Front, and was described as its Arabic wing. It won several seats in Ahvaz's City Council, as well as a seat in the Iranian Parliament.

== Dissolution ==
On 4 November 2006, the Judicial system of Iran banned the party and declared it illegal on charges of "instigating unrest" and "opposing the system", accusing it of fueling 2005 Ahvaz unrest. Following detention of some party members, a faction were radicalized and joined the Arab Struggle Movement for the Liberation of Ahwaz which is a separatist militant organization designated as a "terrorist organization" by Iran.

== Election results ==
Year	Seats	+/–	Ref
Local elections Ahvaz City Council
1999	3 / 9 (33%)	Steady	
2003	8 / 9 (89%)	▲5	
Parliamentary elections Ahvaz, Bavi, Hamidieh and Karoun
2000	1 / 3 (33%)	Steady	
2004	0 / 3 (0%)	▼1	

== See also ==
- Politics of Khuzestan Province
- Arab separatism in Khuzestan
