= Assassination and terrorism in Iran =

Numerous civilians, including men, women, children, government officials, activists, secular intellectuals and clerics have been victims of assassination, terrorism, or violence against non-combatants, over the course of modern Iranian history. Among the most notable acts of terrorism in Iran in the 20th century have been the 1978 Cinema Rex fire and the 1990s chain murders of Iran.

The only Ayatollah to be assassinated by a foreign government was Ayatollah Ali Khamenei on 28 February 2026, during the 2026 Iran war, which started earlier that day. Other Iranian officials were killed during the strikes as well.

Several Iranian prime ministers, president, and ministers were also assassinated by militant groups during the 20th century. Some notable victims include Prime Ministers Mohammad Javad Bahonar, Shapour Bakhtiar, Amir-Abbas Hoveida, Abdolhossein Hazhir and Haj Ali Razmara. Also President Mohammad Ali Rajai, Head of Judiciary Mohammad Beheshti, Chief Commander of the Army Ali Sayad Shirazi, and Minister of Labor Dariush Forouhar.

Alleged, suspected, or admitted perpetrators of terrorism in Iran span a wide range, including Islamic fundamentalists/revivalists (Fadayan-e Islam, Jundallah, Cinema Rex fire, Taliban in a 1998 killing of Iranian diplomats in Afghanistan), Israel or other foreign enemies of the Islamic Republic's nuclear program (Assassination of Iranian nuclear scientists), unidentified anti-Shia extremists (2010 Chabahar suicide bombing, 1994 Imam Reza shrine bomb explosion), Islamist enemies of the Islamic Republic, possibly with help from foreign enemies (Haft-e Tir bombing), hardline Iranian officials (Chain murders of Iran).

== Attacks on Iranians ==
=== Assassinations in the Qajar era ===
Agha Mohammad Khan Qajar was assassinated on 17 June 1797 in the city of Susa (Shushi), the capital of Karabakh khanate, after about 16 years in power. While Mohammad Khan Qajar's assassination might be called part of the ancient practice of palace intrigue, or motivated simply by fear and/or revenge, the 1 May 1896 killing of Naser al-Din Shah Qajar conforms more closely to the modern phenomenon of terrorism as a tool of a political movement. Naser al-Din was shot and killed by Mirza Reza Kermani, a follower of Jamal al-Din al-Afghani, an early promoter of modern Pan-Islamism. Al-Afghani is reported to have said of the assassination, "surely it was a good deed to kill this bloodthirsty tyrant."

=== Fadayan-e Islam ===
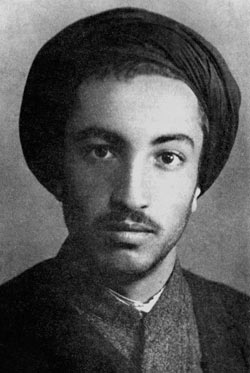
Navab Safavi of Fadayan-e Islam

Fadayan-e Islam was an Islamic fundamentalist secret society founded in Iran in 1946, by a theology student named Navab Safavi. Safavi sought to "purify Islam" in Iran by ridding it of "corrupting individuals" by means of carefully planned assassinations of certain leading intellectual and political figures. Some of its targets in the late 1940s and early 1950s included secularist author Ahmad Kasravi, former prime minister Abdolhossein Hazhir, Education and Culture Minister Ahmad Zangeneh, and Prime Minister Haj-Ali Razmara. Such was the group's influence and success that it was able to use its powerful clerical supporters to free its assassins from punishment. In the mid-1950s, after the consolidation of the power of the Mohammad Reza Shah, the group was suppressed and Safavi executed. The group survived as supporters of the Ayatollah Khomeini and the 1979 Iranian Revolution.

=== 1978 Cinema Rex fire ===
On 19 August 1978, more than 420 people were killed when the Cinema Rex in Abadan was set on fire during a showing of the movie The Deer. The incident was initially blamed on Muhammad Reza Pahlavi's regime, which contributed to the Shah's overthrow.

=== Haft-e Tir bombing and the 1981 Iranian Prime Minister's office bombing ===
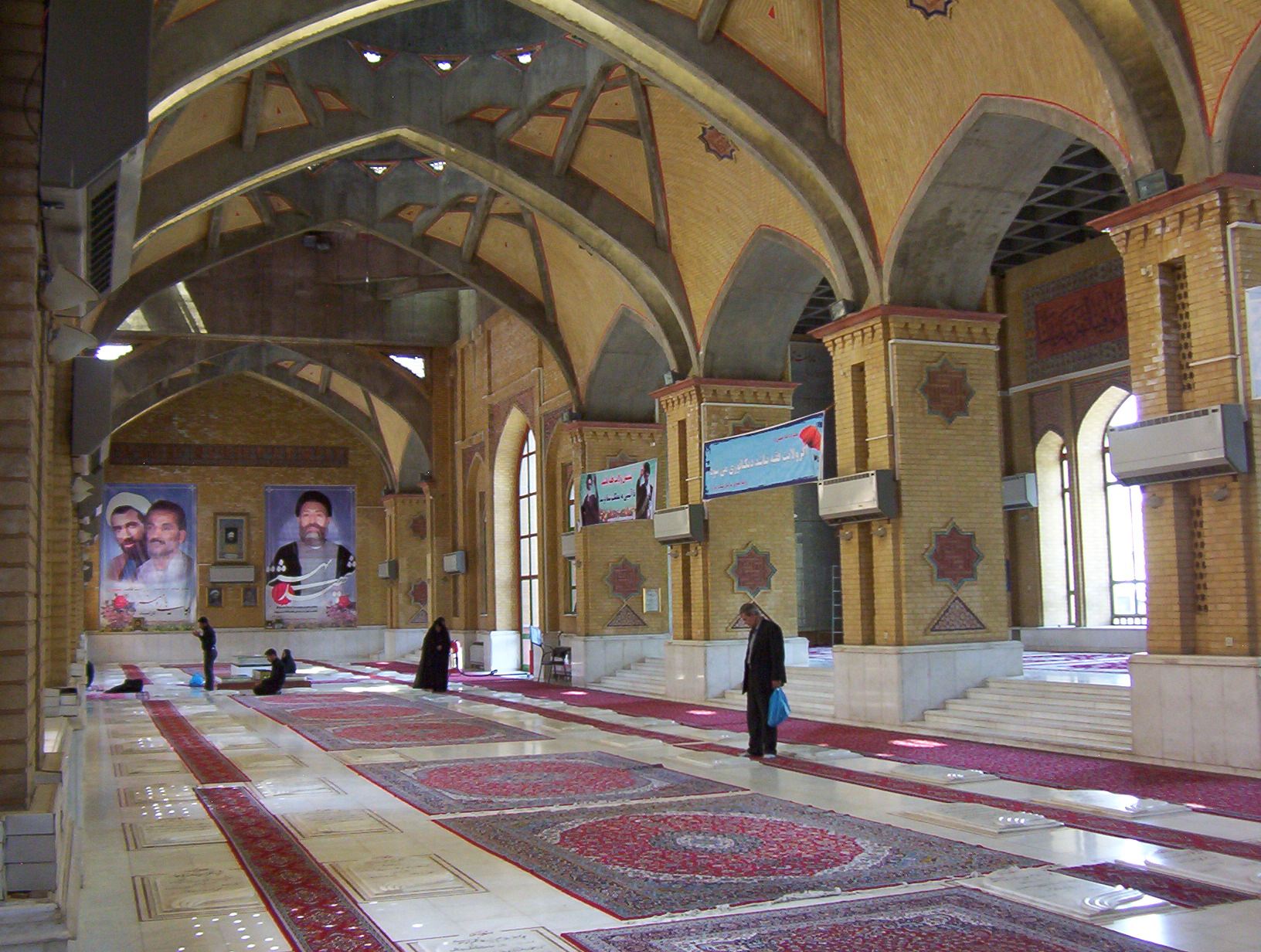
Hafte Tir bombing victims mausoleum, designed by Mir-Hossein Mousavi

On 28 June 1981, a bomb killed 70 high-ranking officials of the Islamic Republic Party, including Chief Justice Mohammad Beheshti who was the second highest official after Ayatollah Khomeini at the time. The Iranian government said the culprits could be SAVAK, or the Iraqi regime, or the People's Mojahedin of Iran. According to Kenneth Katzman, "there has been much speculation among academics and observers that these bombings may have actually been planned by senior IRP leaders, to rid themselves of rivals within the IRP."

On 30 August 1981, the office of Prime Minister Mohammad Javad Bahonar was bombed, killing Bahonar, President Mohammad Ali Rajai, and six other Iranian government officials. The briefcase bombing came two months after the Hafte Tir bombing. According to sources, nobody "knew exactly who had been in the room at the time of the detonation." Eventually, there were three participants that had been unaccounted for, including Masoud Keshmiri, President Rajai, and Prime Minister Bahonar. It was later revealed that both Rajai and Bahonar had died in the explosion. More than twenty suspects were identified in the subsequent investigation, including Masoud Keshmiri, Ali Akbar Tehrani, Mohammad Kazem Peiro Razawi, Khosro Ghanbari Tehrani, Javad Ghadiri, Mohsen Sazgara, Taghi Mohammadi, and Habibollah Dadashi.

=== The 1998 Chain murders ===
Since the founding of the Islamic Republic, dissidents in Iran have complained of unsolved murders and disappearances of intellectuals and political activists who had been critical of the Islamic Republic system in some way. In 1998 these complaints came to a head with the killing of three dissident writers, political leader Dariush Forouhar and his wife in the span of two months, in what became known as the Chain Murders or 1998 Serial Murders of Iran. The deputy security official of the Ministry of Information, Saeed Emami, was arrested for the killings and later committed suicide, although many believe higher level officials were responsible for the killings. According to Iranterror.com, "it was widely assumed that [Emami] was murdered in order to prevent the leak of sensitive information about Ministry of Intelligence and Security operations, which would have compromised the entire leadership of the Islamic Republic."

=== Attacks by Taliban and Sunni extremists ===
==== 1994 Mashhad bombing ====
On 20 June 1994, the explosion of a bomb in a prayer hall of Imam Reza shrine in Mashhad killed at least 25 people. The Iranian government officially blamed Mujahedin-e-Khalq for the incident to avoid sectarian conflict between Shias and Sunnis. However, the Pakistani daily The News International reported on 27 March 1995, "Pakistani investigators have identified a 24-year-old religious fanatic Abdul Shakoor residing in Lyari in Karachi, as an important Pakistani associate of Ramzi Yousef. Abdul Shakoor had intimate contacts with Ramzi Ahmed Yousef and was responsible for the June 20, 1994, massive bomb explosion at the shrine Imam Ali Reza in Mashhad." According to the Jamestown Foundation Terrorism Monitor, "a report produced by the [Iranian] Ministry of Intelligence in October 1994 identified the culprits as operatives of Pakistan's Lashkar-e-Jhangvi the sister organization of Sipah-e-Sahaba."

==== 1998 Mazar-i-Sharif killings ====
On 8 August 1998, the Taliban, assisted by Al-Qaeda, attacked the Afghan city of Mazar-i-Sharif, killing 11 Iranian diplomats and journalists along with thousands of Afghan civilians, in what was considered an attack motivated by takfir against Shias.

More infuriating for Iran was that Pakistan's ISI had guaranteed their security.

Tehran had earlier contacted the Pakistan government to guarantee the security of their Consulate, because the Iranians knew that ISI officers had driven into Mazar with the Taliban. The Iranians had thought that Dost Mohammed's unit had been sent to protect them so had welcomed them at first. .... At first the Taliban refused to admit the whereabouts of the diplomats but then as international protests and Iranian fury increased, they admitted that the diplomats had been killed, not on official orders but by renegade Taliban. But reliable sources said that Dost Mohammed had spoken to Mullah Omar on his wireless to ask whether the diplomats should be killed and Omar had given the go-ahead."

Iran was also angry at the lack of support from Western countries, particularly America, which considered Iran an enemy. Referring to the attack, Iranian Supreme Leader Khamenei alleges that "neither the Americans, nor the Europeans, who are now pursuing Al-Qaeda agents as members of the most dangerous terror organization, showed any reaction at all."

The Taliban were also thought to have "secretly" backed anti-regime Iranian groups. These groups received weapons and support from the Taliban and "Iranians were convinced that the Pakistanis were also sponsoring them." The group sought to overthrow the Shia Iranian government, despite the fact that Iran was overwhelmingly Shia.

The Iranian government responded to the killings by putting its forces on alert and moving troops to the Afghan border, though tensions would subside.

==== Jundallah (since 2003) ====
Jundallah, a Sunni Islamist Baloch insurgent organization based in Balochistan, claims to be fighting for the rights of Sunni in Iran. It is believed to have 1,000 fighters and claims to have killed 400 Iranian soldiers. The group has been identified as a terrorist organization by Iran and Pakistan and many believe it is linked to Al-Qaeda. It is also believed to receive support from the US government.

==== 2007 Zahedan bombing ====
A car filled with explosives stopped in front of a bus full of Revolutionary Guards in Ahmabad district, Zahedan, Sistan-Baluchestan Province at 6:30 a.m. on 14 February 2007. The car, parked in the middle of the road, forced the bus to stop. The car's driver and passengers then got out of the car and used motorbikes to leave the scene while they shot at the bus. A few seconds later the bombs exploded, killing 18 Guards. Guards commander Qasem Rezaei said, "This blind terrorist operation led to the martyrdom of 18 citizens of Zahedan." Rezaei attributed the attack to "insurgents and elements of insecurity." Majid Razavi, an Interior Ministry official, said Iranian police arrested a suspect within an hour of the bombing.

Jundallah, an organization some alleged to be affiliated with Al Qaeda, claimed responsibility for the attack on 15 February and said it is retaliation for the executions of those accused of carrying out the Ahvaz Bombings. The Iranian government arrested five suspects, two of whom were carrying camcorders and grenades when they were arrested, while the police killed the main "agent" of the attack.

Hossein Ali Shahriari, Zahedan's representative in parliament, rhetorically asked, "Why does our diplomatic apparatus not seriously confront the Pakistani government for harboring bandits and regime's enemies? Why do security, military and police officials not take more serious action?"

=== 2005 Ahvaz bombings ===
The Ahvaz bombings were a series of bombings that took place mostly in Ahvaz. The bombings were linked to previous suppression of the Arab unrest in Ahvaz, occurred earlier in 2005. The first bombing came ahead of the presidential election on 12 June. Interior Ministry official Mohammad Hussein Motahar said at the time:

Two bombs were hidden in toilets within the building of the Ministry of Housing and Urban Development and at the Office of Construction and Civil Engineering. The third bomb exploded in front of the house of the governor of Khuzestan Province. All three of these explosions were in the city center of Ahvaz. Another bomb was hidden in the doorway of the house of a [state] radio and television official in Ahvaz. The bomb went off when the door was opened.

=== 2008 Shiraz bombing ===
A terrorist bombing inside a mosque in Shiraz in April 2008 killed 14 people including 10 men, 2 women and 2 children. More than 200 were also injured. Responsibility for the attack has not been determined. However, The Jamestown Foundation reported that the Kingdom Assembly of Iran (API) took responsibility for the attack.

=== 2008 convoy bombing ===
According to Western news reports, at least 15 people were killed and scores wounded in a July 2008 explosion in Tehran. Initially there was a news black-out on the explosion in Iran and Revolutionary Guards launched an investigation into the causes of the blast and the possibility that sabotage was involved. There had been "a number of unexplained explosions in recent months." The convoy was reported to be carrying arms for Hezbollah when it exploded.

=== 2010 Chabahar suicide bombing ===
The 2010 Chabahar suicide bombing was carried out on 14 December 2010 by two suicide bombers, who blew themselves up in the crowded Shiite Muslim mourning procession in Southeastern Iranian coastal city of Chabahar outside Imam Husain Mosque. The bombings took place in the day of Tasua, when Shiite Muslims gathered there to commemorate the martyrdom of Husayn ibn Ali, the grandson of Muhammad. The bombing resulted in killing at least 38 people.

=== 2010–2012 scientist assassinations ===
Four Iranian nuclear scientists were assassinated between 2010 and 2012, and a fifth was wounded in a failed assassination attempt. The Iranian government has accused Israel of committing the attacks, a claim which Israel has denied.

=== 2017 Tehran attacks ===
On 7 June 2017, two simultaneous terrorist attacks were carried out by five terrorists belonging to the Islamic State of Iraq and the Levant (ISIL). The Iranian Parliament building and the Mausoleum of Ruhollah Khomeini, both in Tehran, Iran, were hit, leaving 17 civilians dead and 43 wounded.

=== 2018 Ahvaz attack ===
On 22 September 2018, a military parade was attacked in Ahvaz, a southwestern Iranian city.

=== 2018 Chabahar suicide bombing ===
On 6 December 2018, a suicide bomber detonated his car near a police station killing two policemen and wounding dozens more.

=== 2022 stabbings at Imam Reza shrine ===
On 5 April 2022, a stabbing attack took place at the Imam Reza Shrine in Mashhad, Iran, killing two Shia clerics and wounding a third. The perpetrator, identified as foreign national Abdullatif Moradi, was immediately arrested along with six others accused of assisting him. The victims were active members of non-profit constructing and cultural communities.

The attacker, Abdullatif Moradi, a 21-year-old ethnic Uzbek illegal immigrant from Afghanistan, has been called as a "Takfiri who viewed Shia Muslims as heretics and believed their blood should be spilled". Moradi and his brother were reportedly active in social networks under the names of "Abdullatif al-Salafi", "Hassan Moradi" and "Abulaqib al-Mowahid", criticizing Shia Muslims and promoting Takfiri thoughts. (The "Abdullatif al-Salafi" alias indicates Salafi sympathies.) He was executed by hanging in June 2022.

=== 2022–2023 attacks on Shah Cheragh shrine ===
On 26 October 2022, a gunman shot and killed 15 pilgrims at the Shah Cheragh shrine in Shiraz, including women and children, and wounding scores of others. The man was shot by security forces and later died of his wounds. Daesh (or ISIS) "took responsibility for the attack", but according to Iranian state media, they are "being masterminded by the West and Israel".

On 13 August 2023, another gunman, later identified as Rahmatollah Nowruzo, shot and killed two and injuring seven at the same shrine. He was convicted and sentenced to death twice for "moharebeh" (waging war against God) and other offenses on 22 September 2023, by a Revolutionary court.

According to a statement by Iran's Intelligence Ministry reported by Iranian state media, the ministry's forces had captured a "Daesh-linked" loyalist who performed the "most pivotal" role in the August 13 attack on the shrine, and that 196 Takfiri terrorists were caught or killed between the Ocoter 2022 and August 2023 attacks on the holy site, all of whom were non-Iranians. They were from Azerbaijan, Tajikistan, and Afghanistan.

=== Mahsa Amini protests ===
According to state media, "30 simultaneous terrorist attacks" were set to take place on the one year anniversary of "the riots that broke out in September 2022", i.e. on the date of Mahsa Amini's death at the hands of security forces after she was arrested for allegedly bad hijab. "Iran's intelligence ministry declared its forces neutralized" the planned attacks and arrested 28 terrorists".

=== 2024 Kerman bombings ===
On 3 January 2024, between 15:50 and 16:00 (Iran time), two bombs exploded during a commemorative ceremony marking the assassination of Qasem Soleimani in Kerman.

The twin explosions struck a procession going towards Soleimani's tomb in the Golzar Shohada cemetery, around the Saheb al-Zaman mosque, to commemorate the fourth anniversary of his death. The first explosion occurred 700 metres from Soleimani's grave near a parking lot, while the second occurred one kilometre away at Shohada Street, where many had fled.

At least 89 people were killed and at least another 171 were injured, including three paramedics who responded to the site of the first explosion and were caught in the second blast.

Most of the fatalities were believed to have been killed in the second explosion. Several of the injured were trampled in the panic that followed the explosions.

The Iranian government declared the bombings a terrorist attack, making it the deadliest such incident in the country since 1979.

=== 2025 assassination of Sharia judges ===
On 18 January 2025, Ali Razini and Mohammad Moghiseh, two senior Islamic judges, were shot and assassinated at the Supreme Court of Iran in Tehran by a gunman who committed suicide. Another judge and a bodyguard also were injured in the attack.

=== 2026 assassination of Ali Khamenei ===
On 28 February 2026, Ali Khamenei, the supreme leader of Iran, was assassinated in Tehran as part of a series of Israeli airstrikes aimed at high-ranking Iranian officials. Khamenei's death was confirmed by the Iranian government on 1 March. His death occurred on the first day of the 2026 Iran war, as part of a wider joint operation by Israel and the United States using strategic locations intelligence from the US's Central Intelligence Agency to determine the whereabouts of several leaders. Satellite imagery suggested that Khamenei's residence in the city was severely damaged during the attack.

An unnamed Israeli official said that Khamenei's body was located following the strikes, which was reportedly shown to Israeli Prime Minister Benjamin Netanyahu. US President Donald Trump echoed these reports, calling the reported assassination "justice for people of Iran".

Reports around Khamenei's death were initially disputed by Iranian sources, with Iranian Foreign Ministry spokesman Esmail Baghaei stating that Khamenei is "safe and sound". Despite this, several outlets, such as Reuters and Iran International, citing Israeli government sources, reported that Khamenei was deceased. Following the further spread of the news about the alleged assassination, Iranian media Tasnim and Mehr stated that Khamenei was "steadfast and confirm in commanding the field", once again asserting their claim that Khamenei was not killed during the missile strikes.

Trump, commenting on Khamenei's alleged death, called him "one of the most evil people in history" and announced that the US would continue to bomb Iran. Some members of Congress from the Democratic Party, including Senator John Fetterman, reacted positively to the announcement, while many from the Republican Party, such as Representative Tom Emmer, cheered Trump's post.

Khamenei was the first Iranian head of state to be assassinated since Naser al-Din Shah Qajar in 1896.

== Alleged attacks by the Islamic Republic of Iran ==
In addition to attacks perpetrated in the country of Iran, since the 1979 Iranian Revolution, there have been lethal attacks that took place in other countries but were made possible at some level by the Islamic Republic of Iran.

Specifically, the government of the Islamic Republic has been accused by several countries of training, financing, arming, and providing safe havens for non-state militant actors. Examples include Hezbollah in Lebanon, Hamas in Palestine, and other Palestinian groups (Islamic Jihad (PIJ) and the Popular Front for the Liberation of Palestine-General Command (PFLP-GC)). These groups are designated terrorist groups by a number of countries and international bodies; however, Iran considers such groups to be "national liberation movements" with a right to self-defense in the face of Israeli military occupation.

A number of countries (Argentina, Thailand, Albania, Denmark, France, India, Kenya, United States) have also accused Iran's government itself (usually in the form of the Islamic Revolutionary Guards Corps) of plotting assassinations or bombings against perceived enemies of the Iranian government in their countries.

== See also ==
- Iran and state-sponsored terrorism
- New Great Game
