= 2011 Khuzestan protests =

Violent protests in Iranian Khuzestan

- Part of the Khuzestan conflict, the 2011–12 Iranian protests and the Arab Spring
- Date: 15–18 April 2011
- Location: Ahvaz, Iran
- Methods: demonstrations, riots
- Status: Unrest quelled

Parties
Iranian Arabs	Iranian Government

Lead figures
	Ali Khamenei; Supreme Leader of Iran Mahmoud Ahmadinejad; President of Iran

Casualties
- Deaths: 12–15 protesters killed 1 security officer killed
- Injuries: dozens
- Arrested: hundreds arrested

The 2011 Khuzestan protests, known among protesters as the Ahvaz Day of Rage, relates to violent protests, which erupted on 15 April 2011 in Khuzestan province, to mark an anniversary of the 2005 Ahvaz unrest, and as a response to the regional Arab Spring. The protests lasted for 4 days and resulted in 12 to 15 protesters killed and many wounded and arrested. 1 security officer was killed as well, and another wounded. Crackdown on Arab political opposition in the area continued since with arrests and executions.

== Background ==
The Iranian Embassy Siege of 1980 in London was initiated by an Arab separatist group as an aftermath response to the regional crackdown in Khuzestan, after the 1979 uprising. Initially it emerged the terrorists wanted autonomy for Khuzestan; later they demanded the release of 91 of their comrades held in Iranian jails.

The latest developments of this conflict erupted in the recent decade, when a large scale violent unrest took place in April 2005 and consequently a series of bombings was carried out in Ahvaz and other cities in Iran, blamed upon Sunni Arab separatist groups of Ahvaz.

== History ==
It is believed that initial calls for the protest were prompted by "a leaked secret government strategy to try to change the demographic chart of Ahwaz and make ethnic Arab residents a minority", when they are currently the majority ethnic group in the Khuzestan province.

Protests by Iranian Arabs erupted on 15 April 2011, the sixth anniversary of the 2005 Ahvaz unrest in the city of Ahvaz, capital of the Iranian Khuzestan province. The protesters were "demanding more rights and humanitarian benefits". Al Arabiya reported that when the protests began, the city was blockaded by Iranian security forces, who "broke up demonstrations by force" and that 15 people from Ahwaz have been killed and dozens have been wounded. The security forces were reported to have been using various weapons, such as Kalashnikovs and tear gas canisters. During the night on 15 April, it was reported that "nighttime raids" were conducted against persons believed to have been involved in the protests.

Lebanon-based journalist Roula Hajjar wrote on the Los Angeles Times's blog that the protests on 15 April had also occurred in the cities Abadan, Khorramshahr, Mahshahr and Shadegan. She noted that the events had "largely escaped international attention primarily due to the efforts of Iranian officials." She also stated that the state news agencies in Iran had reported the killing of at least three people, "including one officer", by "armed insurgents". The spread of the protest was attributed to the use of social networking sites Facebook and Twitter.

== Aftermath ==
=== Arrests in late 2011 ===
Iranian security forces arrested more than 65 Arab residents during security sweeps in Iran's Arab-majority Khuzestan province since late 2011 according to local activists, Human Rights Watch said. Reports by local activists indicated security sweeps in the towns of Hamidiyeh, Shush and Ahvaz. At least some of the arrests were carried in response to anti-government slogans and graffiti spray-painted on public property expressing sympathy for the Arab Spring and calling for a boycott of Iran's parliamentary elections of March 2012.

=== Death verdicts to 5 Arab Iranians ===
Five Arab Iranian men from Ahvaz were arrested in 2011 during the demonstrations and were charged of killing a security and intelligence officer and wounding another. They were sentenced to death on 15 March 2012.

== Responses ==
- Human Rights Watch released a statement, saying that the Iranian government should allow international media into the area. Joe Stork, the Middle East director of HRW, stated, "Iran has made it impossible to confirm the scale of the deadly violence against protesters in Khuzestan province, making transparent and independent investigations into alleged killings and arrests there absolutely essential."
- Amnesty International demanded in a news report that the Iranian government "investigate clashes between security forces and protesters" and "called for all those detained to be protected from torture or other ill-treatment and to be granted access to their families, lawyers and adequate medical treatment".
- According to Radio Free Europe/Radio Liberty and The Guardian, Nobel Laureate Shirin Ebadi sent "a letter to UN human rights chief Navi Pillay in which she describes a deadly crackdown by Iranian security forces last week on a peaceful protest in Khuzestan's capital, Ahvaz." Human rights activists told RFE/RL they have received reports that "there were more than 150 arrests, including a number of intellectuals, artists, and women's rights activists." and that "the rest of the activists were told to not speak to any media organization."
- In June 2012, European Union condemned the Iranian authorities, following the pending execution of five members of Iran's Ahvaz Arab minority, over "current disrespect of minority rights" and urged the authorities in Tehran to allow minorities "to exercise all rights granted by the Iranian Constitution and international law".

== Casualties ==
According to Al-Arabiya, 15 Arab protesters were killed in Khuzestan between 15 and 18 April 2011. Nobel Laureate Shirin Ebadi stated that "at least 12 people were killed" in the protests, "20 injured", and "dozens were arrested".

According to Joe Stork, deputy Middle East director at Human Rights Watch, security operations in Khuzestan province since protests there in April 2011, have resulted in the largest number of deaths and injuries since the crackdown that followed the disputed 2009 presidential election.

== See also ==
- list of modern conflicts in the Middle East
- Politics of Khuzestan Province
