= Politics of Khuzestan province =

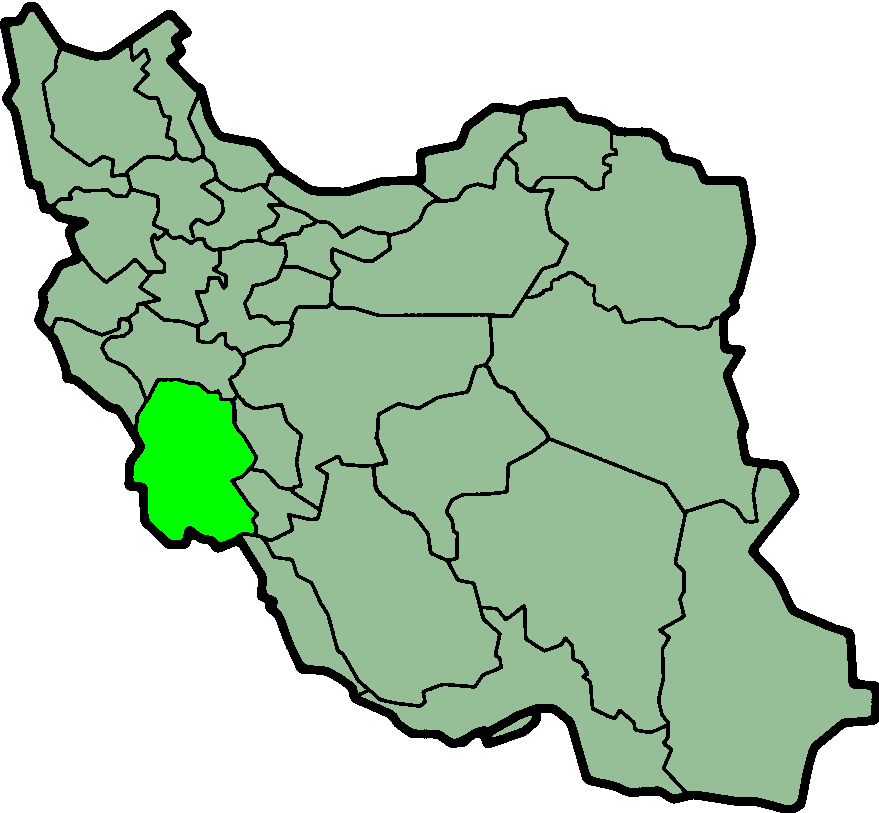
Map of Khuzestan province in Iran

Khuzestan province is a petroleum-rich, ethnically-diverse province in southwestern Iran. Oil fields in the province include Ahvaz Field, Marun, Aghajari, Karanj, Shadegan and Mansouri. Amnesty International has voiced human-rights concerns about Khuzestan's Arab population, and United Nations special rapporteur Miloon Kothari has also drawn attention to Arab displacement and poverty among the Laks.

== Background ==
Khuzestan province is inhabited by a number of ethnic groups: the Bakhtiari, Arabs, Qashqai, Afshar, Persians and Armenians. Half of the province is inhabited primarily by Arabs, and the other half is inhabited primarily by Lurs. Khuzestan's ethnic diversity affects its politics, with ethnic-minority rights playing a significant role. The province's location (bordering Iraq) and its oil resources make it a politically-sensitive region due to its history of foreign intervention, notably the 1980 Iraqi invasion. Ethnic groups, particularly some Arab groups, express grievances. According to Jane's Information Group, "Most Iranian Arabs seek their constitutionally guaranteed rights and do not have a separatist agenda ... While it may be true that some Arab activists are separatists, most see themselves as Iranians first and declare their commitment to the state's territorial integrity."

== Politicians ==
Former Iranian minister of agriculture Mohammad Reza Eskandari, Mohsen Rezaee (secretary of the Expediency Discernment Council), and several parliamentary committee chairs are from Khuzestan. Ali Shamkhani, an Arab from Ahvaz, was minister of defense from 1997 to 2005 as part of President Mohammad Khatami's government. The Iraqi-born Ayatollah Mohsen Araki was a Khuzestan representative in the Assembly of Experts, the personal representative of Ayatollah Ali Khamenei (the Supreme Leader of Iran) in London, and headed the Islamic Centre of England until 2004.

== Human rights ==
Amnesty International routinely raises human rights concerns relating to Khuzestan's Arabs through linking with separatists' websites who provide information, in particular the arrest and detention of political activists, torture and executions. While Khuzestan is not unique in terms of its human rights record, Amnesty notes that often these abuses are related to institutional discrimination. In its report entitled New government fails to address dire human rights situation published in February 2006, Amnesty states:

Even where the majority of the local population is Arab, schools are reportedly not allowed to teach through the medium of Arabic; illiteracy rates are reportedly high, especially among Iranian Arab women in rural areas ... land expropriation by the Iranian authorities is reportedly so widespread that it appears to amount to a policy aimed at dispossessing Arabs of their traditional lands. This is apparently part of a strategy aimed at the forcible relocation of Arabs to other areas while facilitating the transfer of non-Arabs into Khuzestan and is linked to economic policies such as zero interest loans which are not available to local Arabs.

—

In 1997, Human Rights Watch reported that "Iranian Arabs, an ethnic minority centred in southwest Iran, have cited significant restrictions on their language and culture, and on their right to participate effectively in decisions affecting the area in which they live." According to another report in the same year, "Arabic is not taught in elementary schools, and the Arabic teaching in secondary schools focuses exclusively on religious texts. The governor of Khuzestan is not an Arab" while "Arabs make up 35-45 percent of the three million inhabitants of Khuzestan province in the southwest of Iran." In 2005, separatist groups claimed that there was "inadequate attention to their culture and language by state media, facing discrimination in getting jobs, unfair distribution of Khuzestan's oil wealth."

Joe Stork, the director of HRW's Middle East division, said: "The Iranian authorities have again displayed their readiness to silence those who denounce human rights violations. We have serious allegations the government used excessive lethal force, arbitrary arrests and torture in Khuzistan."

=== Arab displacement and Lak poverty ===
After a July 2005 visit to Khuzestan, United Nations Special Rapporteur for Adequate Housing Miloon Kothari reported that industrial and agricultural development had displaced Arabs from their land and they were compensated a fraction of its market value. Kothari said that new housing developments (such as a new town in Shirinshah) were being built for non-Arab workers from Yazd, while local people experienced unemployment and poor housing.

He also drew attention to the Laks (an Iranian people native to the province), calling them "... a very deprived group ... living in conditions of high density, again without access to adequate sanitation and water. And just nearby, you see other neighbourhoods with much better services." Kothari's report suggested that economic marginalisation in Khuzestan is widespread. His findings led to an October 2005 European Parliament resolution condemning the forced displacement of Khuzestani Arabs. The resolution

condemns the treatment of minorities such as ... the inhabitants of the area around Ahwaz city, the provincial capital of the ethnic Arab dominated Khuzestan province, who are being displaced from their villages according to statements by Miloon Kothari, UN Rapporteur on Adequate Housing.

Based on Kothari's findings, the European Parliament unanimously passed a resolution in November 2006 repeating its condemnation of forced displacement in Khuzestan.

== Foreign influence ==
Several Iranian opposition parties operating abroad launched a campaign to stop the American Enterprise Institute from hosting an October 2005 conference. To some, the conference indicated a new alliance between US neoconservatives and Iranian separatists before a possible invasion of Iran by the US and its allies. Ali Al-Taie, a member of the federalist Democratic Solidarity Party of Ahwaz, said during a debate: "When it comes to ethnic rights, Persian opposition groups are on the same side as the terrorist Islamic Republic. If this continues, we will see the Balkanization of Iran." He added, "Despite the long history of persecution, the Arabs of Khuzestan/al-Ahwaz are Iranian. There will never be, nor should there be, disintegration or separatism in Iran. Rather, all Iranian people, regardless of their ethnic background, should live under a pluralistic, tolerant, and federal society."

== Media ==
=== Newspapers ===
Mohammad Hezbawi (also known as Hezbaee Zadeh), editor of Ahvaz's Persian-language Hamsayeha newspaper, was arrested in September 2005 and later released. The newspaper was banned by the Justice Department in February 2006 under clauses four and five of Article 6 of Iran's press law.

=== Television ===
Although Arabic-language television in Khuzestan is state-owned (like other parts of the country), many people also watch foreign Arabic-language satellite channels. The Qatar-based Al Jazeera news channel was blamed by the Iranian government for its coverage of anti-government protests by Arabs in April 2005. The government also objected to Al Jazeera's interview with a member of the separatist Ahwazi Democratic Popular Front (ADPF), who spoke about "80 years of Iranian occupation in Khuzestan". According to the International Federation of Journalists, the government blamed the media for unrest in the province.

Iranian Arab groups have attempted to broadcast to Khuzestan. Their attempts have been frustrated, however, partly due to satellite-dish confiscation in the province.

== Election results ==
Khuzestan has tended to elect reformists, particularly those campaigning on a pro-minorities platform. Bombings in the region have polarised opinion, with some Khuzestan representatives (such as Ahvaz representative Nasser Soudani) calling for hard-line measures against Arab dissent, which the government says is encouraged by British spies.

=== Presidential elections ===
Provincial and national results in the 2005 presidential election
Candidate	Khuzestan votes	Khuzestan %	National votes	National %
Akbar Hashemi Rafsanjani	319,883	20.50	6,211,937	21.13
Mahmoud Ahmadinejad	224,427	14.40	5,711,696	19.43
Mehdi Karroubi	539,158	34.50	5,070,114	17.24
Mostafa Moeen	148,375	9.50	4,095,827	13.93
Mohammad Bagher Ghalibaf	148,207	9.50	4,083,951	13.89
Ali Larijani	58,554	3.70	1,713,810	5.83
Mohsen Mehralizadeh	20,253	1.30	1,288,640	4.38
Total (national turnout 62.66%, Khuzestan turnout 56%)	1,563,000	100	29,400,857	100

Khuzestani voters favoured reformist candidate Mehdi Karroubi, a critic of the Guardian Council who finished third nationally, in the first round of the election; Karroubi's share of the provincial vote was twice the national average. Former president Akbar Hashemi Rafsanjani finished second in Khuzestan (receiving the highest number of votes nationally), followed by conservative Mahmoud Ahmadinejad (winner of the second round).

=== Elections to Parliament ===
Shabib Jouijari won a by-election for the Ahvaz parliamentary seat in December 2006, with 17.9 percent of the 406,808 votes cast.

=== Elections to the Assembly of Experts ===
Khuzestan has six directly elected representatives in the 86-member Assembly of Experts, which is normally elected every eight years to 10-year and has the power the select and supervise the Supreme Leader.

Khuzestan results in the December 2006 Iranian Assembly of Experts election

Representative	Votes	%
Sayad Mohammad Ali Mosawi*	640,943	40.6
Abbas Ka'abi Nasab*	498,218	31.6
Sayad Ali Shafiee*	457,399	29.0
Ali Falahian*	386,767	24.5
Mohammed Hussein Ahmadi	349,825	22.2
Mohsen Haydari al-Kasiri	332,601	21.1
Total (Khuzestan turnout 54%)	1,578,237	n/a
Note: percentages do not add up to 100 percent, since voters had more than one vote.
* = Members who were re-elected

=== Municipal elections ===
December 2006 Ahvaz Municipal Council election results
Representative	Votes
Dariush Mombaini	48,629
Arezo Bababi	36,561
Qasem Jamadi	35,471
Sayed Mehdi Albu Shokeh	32,293
Sayed Reza Falahi Moghadam	32,176
Skander Zanganeh	27,897
Ramadan Monjezi	26,733
Sayed Mohammed Hassan Zadeh	26,269
Gholam Reza Sabze Ali	3,588
Total	226,709

The 2006 Ahvaz municipal elections were won by reformist and conservative candidates. The previous elections were won by the Islamic Reconciliation Party, which won all but one of the seats. The party appealed to the city's Arab population and their grievances. It was then barred from registering and outlawed by the government, which called it a threat to national security. Candidates for the 2006 elections were closely examined before they were allowed to stand.

== See also ==
- Arab separatism in Khuzestan
- History of Khuzestan province
- Origin of the name Khuzestan
- 1979 Iranian Constitutional Assembly election in Khuzestan province
