= Global arrogance =

Colloquial term describing hegemony of the USA

Global arrogance is a term used colloquially to describe the cultural and economic hegemony of the United States over other countries. It differs from the concept of imperialism, in which one country physically occupies another.

Thomas Friedman remarked in 1999 that global arrogance is "when your culture and economic clout are so powerful and widely diffused that you do not need to occupy other people to influence their lives".

== Origin and uses ==
In 1999, Thomas Friedman wrote an editorial in The New York Times Magazine stating that he had noticed the Iranian government had begun calling the United States "the capital of global arrogance" instead of the "Great Satan." (Note: Ruhollah Khomeini, the clerical founder of Islamic Republic of Iran, for example, referred to the West in general and the United States in particular as "estekbar", roughly translated to "arrogance" in English.) Friedman remarked that global arrogance is "when your culture and economic clout are so powerful and widely diffused that you do not need to occupy other people to influence their lives". He further stated the Iranians were not the only ones, writing "The French, Germans, Japanese, Indonesians, Indians and Russians also call [the United States] that now." Other academics and writers have commented on Friedman's remarks.

In her 2005 book, Charting Transnational Democracy: Beyond Global Arrogance, Janie Leatherman wrote that the United States was first described as "the Capital of Global Arrogance" by Iranian students. Iran continues to celebrate the anniversary of the 1979 capture of the U.S. Embassy in Tehran as a "National Day of Campaign against Global arrogance", and the term continues to be used in Iranian newspapers to denounce US foreign policy. The stereotype of the West as arrogant is mainly used in conservative newspapers; it is less frequent in reformist newspapers. After the 2003–2011 Iraq War, accusations of arrogance against the US increased. The United States has historically faced accusations of arrogance including during the Vietnam War. Leatherman says the concept of global arrogance is not limited to supposed American arrogance but encompass a full range of elites of the global political and economic system. They are embedded, Leatherman writes, in the networks and layers of the global governance system–from key institutions such as the World Bank, the International Monetary Fund, the World Trade Organization, the G-7, leading countries, and the major northern NGOs of global civil society. Leatherman says global arrogance, like power, moves and flows through this system, making it is difficult to identify the source of arrogance. According to Weber, arrogance refers to politics rather than people; he says others should listen, understand, agree and act in a way that policies show; and that it is a problem because it is a "disposition [that is] counterproductive to competing effectively in this 21-century global market of ideas".

About the US' supposed global arrogance, Diana Zoelle (Note: She is the author of Globalizing Concern for Women's Human Rights (St. Martin' Press, 2000), and other articles and reviews on gender and international human rights.) and Jyl J. Josephson (Note: She is associate professor of political science and Director of Women's Studies at Rutgers, The State University of New Jersey, Newark campus.) write arrogance is usually conceived in the context of foreign policy but US domestic poverty policies could be a sign of a failed hegemony and a government that is unable to provide basic resources in terms of jobs and social services for a large part of its population. According to Zoelle and Josephson, the costs of the global war on terrorism are used to justify the reduction of social spending at home.

The prominent Iranian cleric, Hossein Noori Hamadani, once described 7th-century Medina as "the center of Zionists" and portrayed the mass killing of its Jewish inhabitants as a necessary step to strengthen Islam and crush "the bastion of global arrogance."

In 2021, Foreign Policy accused the People's Republic of China (PRC) of global arrogance, arguing the PRC government is repeating American mistakes.

The term "World Series Syndrome" refers to the arrogance of the American domestic baseball championship being called the World Series despite only US teams taking part, until 1969, when the Canadian Montreal Expos were admitted.

== Arguments ==
According to Daniel E. Price, globalization is considered in many countries of the Islamic world as a tool for American domination that must be resisted. In her book, The Soul of Justice, Cynthia Willett writes:

We fear Islamic fundamentalists because they threaten violence in the name of unyielding principles. We refuse, however, to understand how economic and cultural forces of powerful nations may damage citizens of weaker nations by destroying their culture and livelihood, and by rendering their nations dependent upon foreign powers.

Willett quotes Thomas Friedman, who she says provides insight into anti-Western sentiment by pointing to the zeal behind Western discourse, as saying:

"We Americans are the apostles of the Fast World, the prophets of the free market, and high priests of high tech. We want the 'enlargement' of both our values and our Pizza Huts. We want the world to follow our lead and become democratic and capitalistic, with a Web site in every pot, a Pepsi on every lip, [and] Microsoft Windows in every computer." Is it clear who "fundamentalists" are? I am not so sure. The journalist continues: "No wonder, therefore, that resentment of America is on the rise globally." Sometimes we tend to see exaggerated in the Other what we most deny in ourselves.

According to Thomas Friedman, globalization leads to global arrogance based on soft power (culture, technology and economy) rather than occupation and imperialism. US efforts to avoid international scrutiny and refuse to sign international treaties on global warming or the International Criminal Court, according to Barber, are viewed as signs of arrogance and imperialist intentions. Yusuf al-Qaradawi, an Islamist scholar, argues that "globalization means the imposition of US hegemony. Any state that rebels or sings to a different tune must be punished by blockades, military threats, or direct attack as happened with Sudan, Iraq, Iran and Libya." The imposition involves a US culture "based on materialism, self-interest and unrestrained freedoms." Thus, US-led globalization is driven by the "unjustified arrogance and conceit" of the Pharaoh, persecuting humanity to benefit a tiny minority."

Ali Farazmand believes current global stereotypes against Islam by the United States government, and the media and corporate organizations, which are predominantly Christian, have created a global image of Muslims as terrorists and the people of the Middle East as fanatics who should be enlightened by Judaeo-Christianity. Farazmand says this ideological, global, political propaganda against Islam serves only global arrogance, global religious divisions, and enmity between nations, and "promotes the global arrogance of self-declared Christian superiority".

In Iran, people's perception of the United States as a "land of milk and honey" has long been associated with another image of hostility and arrogance. According to the Iranian journalist and lecturer Ehsan Bakhshandeh, most Iranians hate the West not because they reject Western values but because they have suffered from hostile Western policies. He says the use of the term "global arrogance" to portray the West can be attributed to the history of Iran-West relations, especially the way Americans have treated Iranians.

Carlos A. Parodi (Note: He is associate professor and teaches in the Department of Politics and Government of Illinois State University. His most recent book is The Politics of South American Boundaries (Praeger, 2001)) said the dissolution of the Soviet Union gave the United States greater freedom to use military force to defend its interests. He quotes Noam Chomsky, who said; "It should have surprised no one that George Bush celebrated the symbolic end of the Cold War, the fall of the Berlin Wall, by immediately invading Panama and announcing loud and clear that the United States would subvert Nicaragua's election by maintaining its economic stranglehold and military attack unless 'our side' won".

Criticism also came from outside the US; Mohammad Hussein Fadlallah spoke of the "incessant struggle between the international forces of arrogance and oppression (represented by the United States, Western powers and Israel) and the oppressed nations, which comprise the Arab and Muslim Worlds and more generally the Global South", and said international arrogance does its best to weaken Muslims so Islam does not become a powerful force in the world and to "sow discord among Muslims". Ali Khamenei, in a speech in November 1994, said: "when a government does not look up to [the US] and refuses to consider them as superpower, then they cannot stand it any longer".

According to Leatherman, Iranian Ayatollahs Ruhollah Khomeini and Ali Khamenei saw the West as a source of colonial and neo-colonial domination whose supremacy was to the detriment of Third World countries. Benjamin Barber said US efforts to ensure domestic prosperity seem like a justification for repressing and exploiting others. According to Price, the United States military invasion of the Islamic world–two invasions of Iraq, one of Afghanistan–along with supporting the kings and dictators of Jordan, Saudi Arabia, Morocco, Yemen, Egypt, and Tunisia, are efforts to control the value of the region's natural resources such as oil for its own benefit.

== See also ==
- Cultural imperialism
- Economic imperialism
- Neocolonialism
- Cocacolonization
- Globalization
- Westsplaining

== Sources ==
- Leatherman, J.; Webber, J., eds. (2005). Charting Transnational Democracy: Beyond Global Arrogance. US: Palgrave Macmillan. ISBN 9781403981080.
