= Ahvaz National Resistance =

Arab separatist group in Iran

Ahwaz National Resistance
- مقاومت ملی اهواز
- Flags used by the group to represent an Arab state in Khuzestan
- Country: Iran
- Active regions: Khuzestan Province
- Ideology: Arab separatism

The Ahwaz National Resistance (Persian: مقاومت ملی اهواز) is an ethnic Arab opposition movement in Iran that seeks an independent state in Khuzestan Province.

Described by Israeli newspaper Haaretz as "an umbrella organization of all armed movements", the Ahvaz National Resistance claimed responsibility for the 2018 Ahvaz military parade attack. The Islamic State of Iraq and the Levant later also claimed responsibility. Speaking to Iran International TV in London, Yaqoub al-Tostari, (Note: Alternate spellings include Yagoub Hor Altasteri and Yaghub Hur Totsari.) spokesman for one of the two groups that identify themselves as the Arab Struggle Movement for the Liberation of Ahvaz, said the Ahvaz National Resistance was behind the attack, which killed 25 people excluding the five assailants, but did not specify which group.

On 23 September 2018, Danish broadcaster DR stated that al-Tostari lives in Denmark and had an interview with him, explaining a day later that the name "Yaqoub al-Tostari" is a cover, and that his real name is known to the broadcaster.

== See also ==
- Arab separatism in Khuzestan
- National Liberation Movement of Ahwaz
- Arab Struggle Movement for the Liberation of Ahwaz
