= Habib Chaab =

Iranian-Swedish political activist (1973–2023)

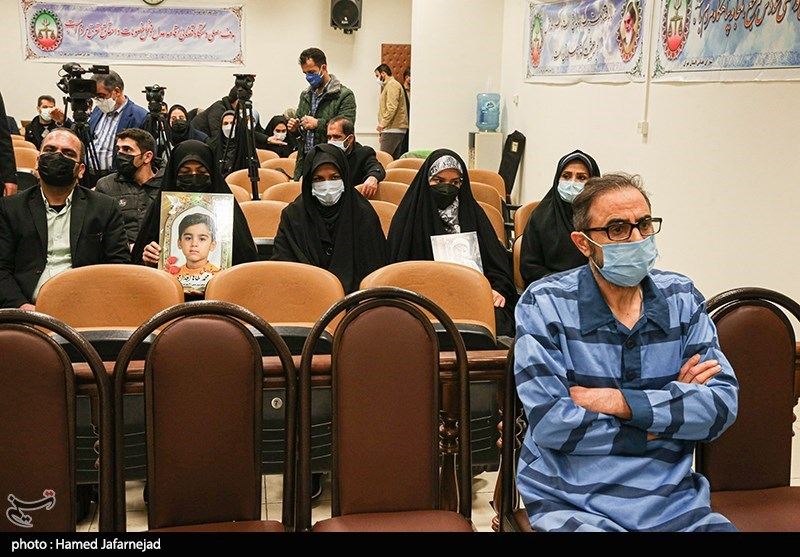
- Chaab during a court hearing in 2022
- Born: Habib Farajollah Chaab; 1 July 1973; Eyleh-ye Yek, Shushtar, Khuzestan province, Pahlavi Iran
- Died: 6 May 2023 (aged 49); Iran
- Other name: Habib Osayved
- Citizenship: Iran, Sweden
- Occupations: Political activist Political prisoner

Habib Farajollah Chaab (Persian: حبیب فرج‌الله چعب; Arabic: حبيب فرج الله شاب), known as Habib Osayved (Persian: حبیب اسیود; 1 July 1973 – 6 May 2023), was an Iranian Arab political activist with Swedish citizenship, founder and leader of Arab Struggle Movement for the Liberation of Ahwaz. In October 2020, having lived in exile in Sweden for 14 years, he visited Turkey where he was abducted and smuggled to Iran. Turkish security sources state that Iranian intelligence was behind Chaab's kidnapping.

Chaab was executed by hanging in Iran, on 6 May 2023, after being accused of masterminding a 2018 attack on a military parade that killed 25 people. He was 49. The European Union afterwards strongly verbally condemned the execution and reiterated its strong opposition to the application of the death penalty in all circumstances.
