= Arab Struggle Movement for the Liberation of Ahwaz =

Arab separatist group in Iran

- Founding leader: Ahmad Mola Nissi †
- Leaders: Habib Jabor (Danish HQ); Saddam Hattem (Dutch HQ); Habib Chaab (executed)
- Spokesperson: Yaqoub al-Tostari
- Dates active: 2005–present
- Groups: Mohiuddin Nasser Martyrs Brigade; • Majid al-Baghbeh Martyrs Battalion; • Razi al-Zarqani Martyrs Battalion; • al-Farouq Battalion
- Headquarters: Copenhagen, Denmark; The Hague, Netherlands
- Active regions: Khuzestan Province, Iran
- Ideology: Arab nationalism; Ethnonationalism; Saddamism; Separatism; Anti-Persian sentiment
- Size: 300 (unconfirmed estimate)
- Wars: Arab separatism in Khuzestan

The Arab Struggle Movement for the Liberation of Ahwaz (Arabic: حركة النضال العربي لتحرير الأحواز, romanized: Ḥarakat an-Niḍāl al-ʿArabī li-Taḥrīr al-ʿAhwāz; abbreviated ASMLA) is an Arab nationalist and separatist insurgent group which advocates the secession of an area in southern Iran including all of Khuzestan Province and Bushehr Province and parts of Lorestan province, Ilam Province, Hormozgan Province, Chaharmahal and Bakhtiari Province and Kohgiluyeh and Boyer-Ahmad Province from Iran and the establishment of an Arab state, a goal which it is attempting to achieve by waging a direct and violent conflict against Iran. The claimed area is shown in the group's logo as well.

Headquartered in Denmark and the Netherlands, the ASMLA has claimed responsibility for several assassinations, attacks against energy infrastructure and civilian soft targets, including 2005–06 Ahvaz bombings and Ahvaz military parade attack in 2018. The group is currently classified as a terrorist organization by the Iranian government.

== History ==
The ASMLA was covertly established by Ahmad Mola Nissi and Habib Jabor, members of the Islamic Reconciliation Party who under cover of doing legal and legitimate political activities, formed the group and its armed wing. They did not declare existence until 2005, when a fabricated government document was circulated among the Khuzestani Arabs to provoke ethnic tensions. Shortly after the group's military wing, MMDNB, carried out attacks in which many people, including civilians, were killed. In spring 2006, ASMLA founders fled Iran to avoid prosecution by the Iranian security forces and moved to the United Arab Emirates. They visited the Consulate General of the United States in Dubai and asked to meet a representative from the Central Intelligence Agency (CIA). Mola Nissi and Jabor were granted refugee status in the Netherlands and Denmark respectively.

== Organization ==
According to Casey Donahue, since 2007 the group has operated in two headquarters located in Denmark and the Netherlands, but in October 2015 the ASMLA experienced a schism. Both Dutch and Danish factions use the same name and flag, and continue to claim they control the 'Martyrs Brigade', ASMLA's military wing. There are reports indicating that the two factions split over disagreements about how Saudi money they receive should be used.

=== Leadership ===
The Danish faction is based in Copenhagen and led by Habib Jaber al-Ka'abi (born c. 1969 or 1970 (age 56–57), a.k.a. Habib Jabor). He was a teacher and principal in schools of Ahvaz and immigrated to Denmark. al-Ka'abi ran for a parliamentary seat in Iran but lost the election. He holds Danish citizenship and is under full protection of Denmark's security services. On 30 October 2018, the Danish Security and Intelligence Service (DSIS) accused "Iran of plotting assassination on Danish soil", planning to kill the leader of ASMLA, who lives there. The threat of an assassination was the source of a country-wide police action in Denmark on 28 September. DSIS announced that three persons related to ASMLA are under police protection, and that there still is an active threat. Iran dismissed the accusations.

The founding leader of the Dutch faction based in The Hague was Ahmad Mola Nissi, who was killed in November 2017. Nicholas A. Heras wrote in 2019 that after Nissi's death, al-Ka'abi is the sole leader of ASMLA, however Casey Donahue maintains that Nissi was succeeded by Saddam Hattem in June 2018.

In October 2020, Iran arrested Habib Chaab who allegedly orchestrated the Ahvaz military parade attack, who was based in Sweden and holds Swedish citizenship. He was lured by a female agent.

=== Ideology and positions ===
ASMLA's profile on Terrorism Research & Analysis Consortium repository and a piece published by the Jamestown Foundation in 2011 suggest that the group is Ba'athist, the latter also mentioning that in 2007 it had recognized Izzat Ibrahim al-Douri as the successor of Saddam Hussein and the new leader of the Iraqi Ba'ath party.

The group refers to Iran as the "Persian enemy" and says that it wants to "liberate Ahwaz lands and people from the Iranian occupation". They compare themselves with Palestinians. ASMLA pictures the territory of its proposed state to be beyond Khuzestan Province borders, including Zagros Mountains and the northern coasts of the Persian Gulf. It also claims the entire Bushehr province, as well as parts of Ilam, Lorestan, Chaharmahal and Bakhtiari, Kohgiluyeh and Boyer-Ahmad, Fars and Hormozgan, which combined have a population drastically more than total number of Arabs living in all Iran.

Hamid Dabashi, professor of Iranian Studies at Columbia University, who was born and raised in Ahvaz, states that it is a cosmopolitan and pluralist city with people from different ethnic backgrounds, while the separatists make an exclusive and absolutist claim on the city due to a "decidedly racialised, ethnicised" and "narrow-minded ethno-nationalist" ideology.

ASMLA claims that its proposed state would be a democratic republic in which free elections will be held and human rights will be respected, however its use of violence against civilians and the way the organization is run by its leaders contradicts with democratic values. Witnesses interviewed by the Swedish Security Service in the 2019 espionage case have described the group's leader as "authoritarian" and "machiavellian".

The organization has argued in favor of creating an "Arab NATO" that will take military action against Iran.

=== Military wing ===
The military wing of ASMLA is named Mohiuddin Nasser Martyrs Brigade (MMDNB). It kept a low profile between 2006 and 2011. In 2019, an analyst affiliated with the group told the Jamestown Foundation that the military wing of the ASMLA has about 300 members operating inside Iran, but there is no independent verification for this number. The following cells has been named in the group's statements as part of the military wing:

- Majid al-Baghbeh Martyrs Battalion
- Razi al-Zarqani Martyrs Battalion
- al-Farouq Battalion

=== Front organizations ===
ASMLA takes advantage of several front organizations that are an integral part of its structure, despite being nominally independent. These organizations are mainly used as propaganda tools. They include:

- Ahwazi Organization for the Defense of Human Rights (AODHR), registered in Denmark on 6 September 2017; renamed to European-Ahwazi Organization for the Defense of Human Rights on 30 August 2018
- Gulf-European Centre for Human Rights (GECHR), registered in the United Kingdom in 2018
- Arabic-European Foundation for International Relations (AEFIR), registered in Denmark on 24 January 2017 and dissolved on 26 January 2020
- Dur Untash Center for Strategic Studies (DUSC), registered in Denmark on 30 August 2018
- Ahwaz Monitor
- Ahwazna Forening, registered in Denmark in 2014 and dissolved in May 2020
- Ahwaz Press, registered in Denmark in 2015 and dissolved in 2019
- Ahwazian Pen Foundation for Culture and Media, registered in Denmark in 2016 and dissolved in February 2020
- Ahwaziska Kulturförningen-AKF, registered in Sweden

== Timeline of attacks ==
2005

- June 12: ASMLA claimed responsibility for a series of four bomb explosions in Ahvaz. One of the bombs was concealed in a briefcase outside a residential area and was exploded when authorities were moving it to a secure area, while one blew up the governor's office and the other two were in public buildings. The bombings collectively killed at least 8 people and left some 75 wounded, including women and children.

2006

- January 24: Bombs were blown up in a branch of Saman Bank in Kianpars neighborhood of Ahvaz, as well as the city's natural resources government office, killing at least 8 people and injuring 46 others, including staff and clients in the bank. The ASMLA claimed responsibility for the killings by issuing a statement, saying "[o]ur heroes... in the military wing of The Arab Struggle Movement for the Liberation of Ahwaz attacked and destroyed the dens of the occupying enemy".

2012

- October 23: A gas pipeline facility near Shush was exploded and the ASMLA took responsibility for the attack.

2013

- August: A petro-chemical plant was attacked by the group.
- November 27: The group announced that its Majid al-Baghbeh Martyrs Battalion of the Mohiuddin al-Nasser Martyrs Brigade has conducted attacks on natural gas pipelines running from Shadegan and Sarbandar.

2015

- April 2: A police checkpoint in Hamidiyeh was attacked, resulting in three officers being killed and two injured.
- May 14: ASMLA bombed a government office in Susangerd. The number of casualties is uncertain.
- September 3: An oil installation in Arjan was attacked.
- September 6: ASMLA claimed responsibility for bombing an oil pipeline near Behbahan.

2016

- January 2: An attack on a pipeline north of Ahvaz was claimed to have been conducted by the Battalion of Martyr Razi Zarqani.
- June 14: The group claimed its Battalion of Martyr Razi Zarqani has "crippled the flow of oil from Ahvaz toward Tehran" in Zarqan.
- July 17: ASMLA declared its al-Farouq Battalion has targeted oil pipelines in Haftkel County and claimed that the perpetrators have successfully escaped Iranian forces.

2017

- January 2: The group claimed to have caused major damages to petroleum pipelines of Marun Field and those from the Baharkan oilfield to Kharg Island. A spokesman for the Iranian interior ministry denied this.
- January: ASMLA claimed responsibility for killing two servicemen in the Islamic Revolutionary Guard Corps.
- April: The group claimed it had put oil pipelines on fire.

2018

- February 26: ASMLA claimed it had bombed oil facilities.
- September 22: Four assailants disguised in IRGC uniforms attacked a military parade in Ahvaz, killing 29 and wounding 70 people, including civilians. ASMLA claimed responsibility for the attack, which was also claimed by the Islamic State of Iraq and the Levant (ISIL). ASMLA later denied involvement, after Iranian foreign ministry summoned the ambassadors of Denmark and the Netherlands in Tehran in protest for hosting the group.

== Terrorist designation ==
Iran designates ASMLA as a terrorist organization.

In February 2020, Dutch police arrested one ASMLA member in Delft for membership of a terrorist organization and suspicion of planning terrorist attacks inside Iran, despite the fact the European Union does not consider ASMLA a terrorist group. Earlier, three suspected ASMLA members had been arrested in November 2018 by Police of Denmark, which announced they were "suspected of violating the Danish law... on condoning terrorism".

== Foreign sponsorship ==
Iran has accused Saudi Arabia of supporting the group, which the Saudis have rejected.

Finn Borch Andersen, chief of the Danish Security and Intelligence Service (PET), told the press in February 2020 that his agency had arrested three members of the ASMLA who have been spying for a Saudi Arabian intelligence service in Denmark from 2012 to 2018.

In November 2020, Iranian Ministry of Intelligence published what it said was secret correspondence between ASMLA and the Saudi intelligence agency General Intelligence Presidency.

Nazanin Soroush, writing in an April 2015 issue of Jane's Intelligence Weekly, comments that ASMLA is likely to receive foreign support from Iran's opponents, and act as a proxy. Rasmus Christian Elling of the University of Copenhagen suggests that the group has probably received support from Saudi Arabia and the United Arab Emirates, stating "there are certain indications that groups such as ASMLA are receiving support, either from private individuals or state institutions in Gulf countries. It would be interesting, for example, to know how they can afford to launch TV stations with brand new equipment in places such as the Netherlands and Denmark".

In April 2021, Danish Security and Intelligence Service (PET) charged three senior members of ASMLA for aiding and abetting terrorism, illegal intelligence activities as well as financing and promoting terrorism in Iran in collaboration with Saudi intelligence.

== Relations with non-state actors ==
In September 2012, head of the ASMLA met Mohammad Riad al-Shaqfeh, his counterpart in the Muslim Brotherhood of Syria, indicating a potential cooperation between the two organizations. The possibility of links between the ASMLA and the Islamic State of Iraq and the Levant has also been suggested by analysts. During the 2026 Iran war, they joined the Coordinating Council of Ahwazi Organizations with several other Arab separatist groups.

== See also ==
- Democratic Revolutionary Front for the Liberation of Arabistan
- National Liberation Movement of Ahwaz
- Ahvaz National Resistance
