= Hossein Noori Hamedani =

Iranian Twelver Shi'a Marja (born 1925)

Grand Ayatollah Hossein Noori Hamedani آيت الله العظمى حسين نورى همدانى
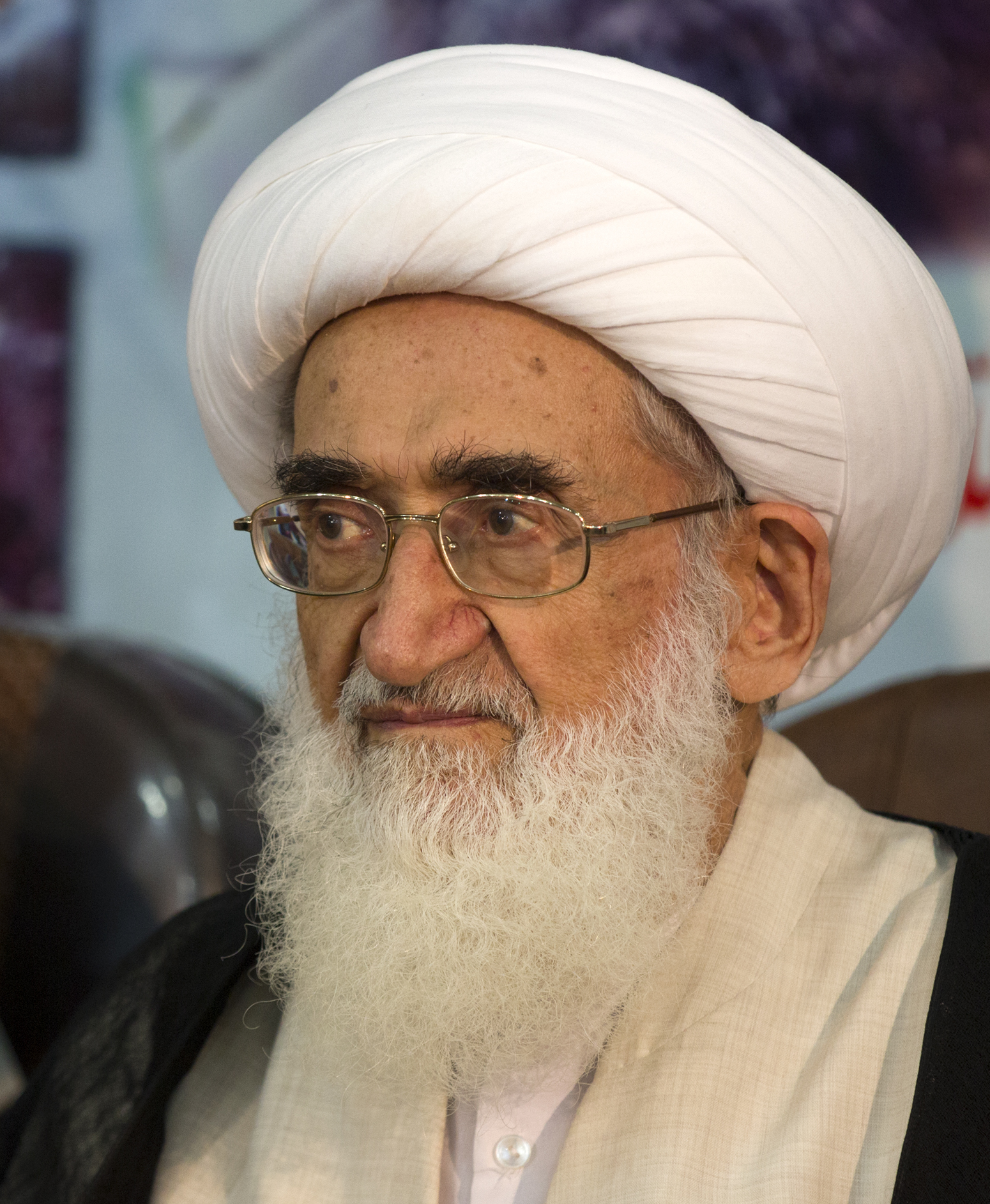
- Noori Hamedani in 2017
- Title: Grand Ayatollah

Personal life
- Born: 21 March 1925 (age 101) Hamadan, Sublime State of Iran
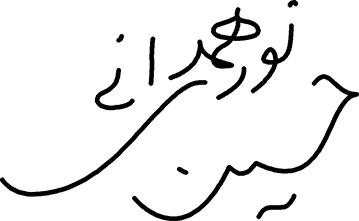
- Signature
- Website: www.noorihamedani.com

Religious life
- Religion: Islam
- Denomination: Twelwer Shi'a
- Jurisprudence: Ja'fari
- Creed: Usuli

Muslim leader
- Based in: Qom, Iran

Grand Ayatollah Hossein Noori-Hamedani (Persian: آيت الله العظمى حسين نورى همدانى; born 21 March 1925), also Hossein Nuri-Hamedani, is an Iranian Twelver Shi'a Marja' known for his conservative or "ultra-conservative" views.

He has publicly expressed his disapproval of Sufis and dervishes, Jews, the intellectual Abdolkarim Soroush, the UN Convention on the Elimination of All Forms of Discrimination Against Women, and "anti-Islamic and atheist professors" in Iranian universities, whose purge he has called for. He has been noted for being the only grand ayatollah to congratulate Mahmoud Ahmadinejad when Ahmadinejad was first declared victor in the controversial 12 June 2009 election; and also as "celebrated by the central government for his wholehearted support of the leader and the president".

== Early life and education ==
Hosein Nuri-Hamadani was born in Hamadan, Iran. After finishing elementary studies in Hamadan, at the age of 17 he moved to Qom, Iran to continue his religious studies. He studied in the seminaries of Allameh Tabatabai and Grand Ayatollah Borujerdi. He currently resides and teaches in the Seminary of Qom.

== Views and activities ==
Hosein Nuri-Hamadanii is reported to be one of the figures behind the 19 August 1978 Cinema Rex fire where four men trapped moviegoers in a cinema in Abadan, Iran and set it on fire, killing around 400. Outrage at the fire was instrumental in the overthrow of the Shah's regime and creation of the Islamic Republic, as popular opinion blamed the fire and deaths on the shah's SAVAK security forces. This was despite the fact that Islamic conservatives were known to condemn motion picture entertainment as unIslamic and had been "setting ablaze cinemas and other venues of supposed Western decadence for more than a decade".

A couple years later, a drug addict and thief turned religious revolutionary named Hossein Takbalizadeh came forth to announce that it was he and three friends who had set the Cinema Rex on fire as a blow against the decadent Western culture, having been goaded into action by a local conservative Shi'i cleric. That a supporter of the revolution and not one of the Shah's minions, was responsible for the slaughter was not the narrative favored by the new Islamist regime. A trial was held after pressure from the public and the families of victims. The Islamic Republic prosecution maintained that contrary to his confession, Takbalizadeh was in fact secretly manipulated by the Shah’s agents. He was convicted and executed.

Noori Hamedani has been called "aligned" with the Islamic Republic’s "ultra-conservative establishment" and known for "strongly" backing Supreme Leader Ali Khamenei on "several occasions — notably during the 2009 protests against the reelection of former president Mahmoud Ahmadinejad".

Among his reported views are that Iran "must purge universities of anti-Islamic and atheist professors." In September 2006, he called for a clampdown on dervish groups in Qom. He also issued a fatwa against the attendance of women in stadiums. In early 2008, he issued what some see as an implicit death threat against Iranian intellectual Abdolkarim Soroush, saying "Soroush’s writings are worse than Salman Rushdie's", and "Abdolkarim Soroush’s religious theories have undermined the roots of prophecy, the Quran and holy revelations".

In 2006, Hamedani stated that by not engaging in politics, Sufis weaken Islam, and during another speech to a group of seminarians, claimed "that the adherents of Sufism are 'enemies' of Islam and promoting them in any form is forbidden". According to a 2018 report by RLRFE, some of the dervish "houses of worship have been destroyed in past years, while hundreds of members have been detained and more than a dozen have been sentenced to prison terms, lashes, or internal exile."

Noori Hamedani issued a comment about fighting and vanquishing Jews in 2005 that was later removed from the Fars news agency website. In a meeting with members of the Mahdaviyat Studies Institute (which studies the Shiite doctrine of the Hidden Imam, who is to reappear as Mahdi, i.e., the rightly guided one), circa 14 April 2005, Noori Hamedani praised the work of the institute and urged howza (seminaries) in Qom to carry out more research of religious texts and hadith concerning the Hidden Imam. He also claimed that a way to create conditions that would lead to the return of the Hidden Imam (i.e. an activity which Muslims should do) is to '... fight the Jews and vanquish them so that the conditions for the advent of the Hidden Imam be met.' His comments were published on Fars news agency website. (However, Fars "took the report off its web site several hours after its publication, and other Iranian media outlets close to the conservatives refrained from citing it".)

Noori Hamadani described 7th-century Medina as "the center of Zionists" and portrayed the mass killing of its Jewish Banu Qurayza inhabitants as a necessary step to strengthen Islam and crush "the bastion of global arrogance."

In connection with the Iranian legislature's ratification of a bill on Iranian membership in the UN Convention on the Elimination of All Forms of Discrimination Against Women (CEDAW), ISNA reported Nuri-Hamadani issued a statement on 2 August 2003 describing the convention as "calamitous and tragic", as well as "a Western and U.S. ploy to harm Islam." According to him, when the convention was brought to Qom, all the religious authorities opposed it as contrary to Islam.

He condemned the 2023 protest burning of the Quran in Sweden and emphasized that the western claims about freedom of expression and human rights claims are nothing but a "sheer lie" and a pretext to justify the crimes of the protesters.

In contrast to other hardline views, in 2022 he was quoted by the state-run IRNA news agency as stating in regards to the Mahsa Amini protests, “it is necessary for officials to listen to people’s demands and solve their problems and be sensitive to their rights”.

He turned 100 in March 2025.

On March 1, 2026, following the assassination of Ali Khamenei, he declared in a fatwa that it is obligatory for every Muslim in the world to avenge the blood of Ali Khamenei.

== Publications ==
Noori-Hamedani has authored numerous works on Islamic jurisprudence, theology, and ethics, including:

- Tawdih al-Masa’il (رسالة توضیح المسائل)
- Al-Amr bil-Ma‘ruf wa al-Nahy ‘an al-Munkar (الأمر بالمعروف والنهي عن المنكر)
- Muntakhab al-Masa’il (منتخب المسائل)
- Manasik al-Hajj (مناسك الحج)
- Al-Khums (الخمس)
- Al-Riba (الربا)
- Al-Jihad (الجهاد)
- Al-Insan wa al-‘Alam (الإنسان والعالم)
- Al-Iqtisad al-Islami (الاقتصاد الإسلامي)
- Al-Islam al-Mujassam (الإسلام المجسم)
- Al-Qasas al-Tarikhiyya (القصص التاريخية)
- ‘Ilm ‘Asr al-Fada’ (علم عصر الفضاء)

== See also ==
- Lists of maraji
- List of members in the First Term of the Council of Experts
