= Mohammad Kiavash =

Iranian politician (1930–2020)

Mohammad Kiyavosh محمد کیاوش
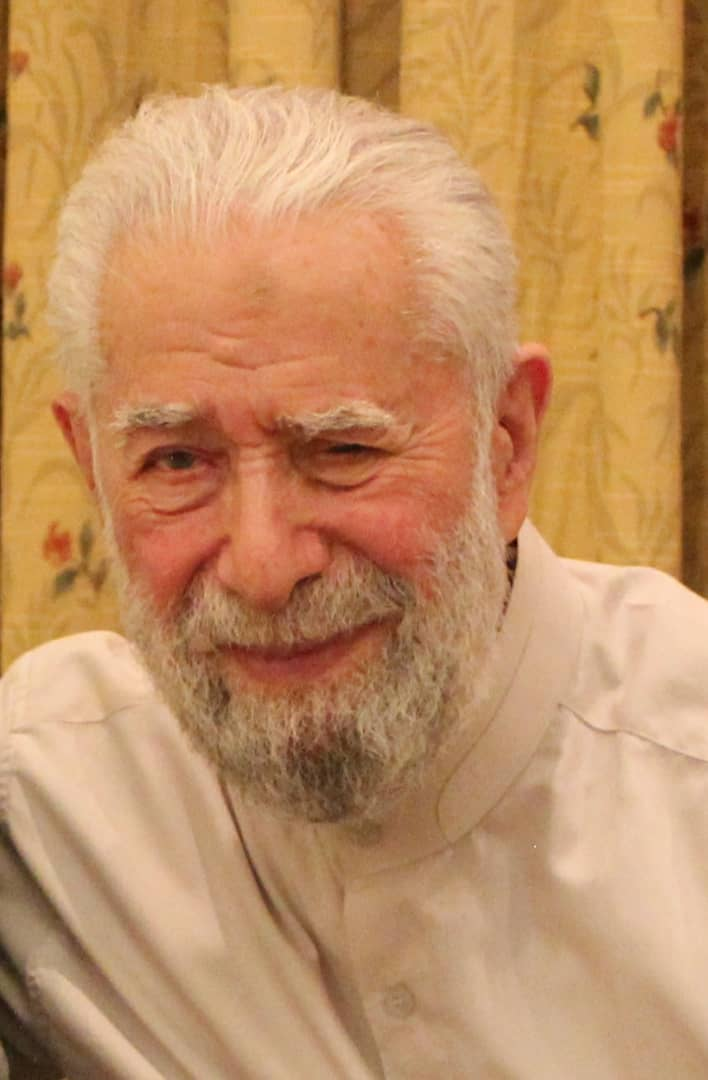

Member of the Parliament of Iran
- In office 1984–1988
- Constituency: Abadan
- In office 1980–1984
- Constituency: Ahwaz

Personal details
- Born: 1930 Zanjan, Iran
- Died: 10 March 2020 (aged 89–90) Tehran, Iran
- Cause of death: COVID-19

Mohammad Alavi Tabar (Persian: محمد علوی‌تبار, also known as Kiyavash; 1930 – 10 March 2020) was an Iranian politician.

== Biography ==
Mohammad Alavi Tabar was born in 1930 in Zanjan. He was a follower of jurisprudential Islam.

Mohammad Alavi Tabar served as a member of the Iranian Parliament representing Ahvaz between 1980 and 1984, representing Abadan between 1984 and 1988.

Mohammad Alavi Tabar died from COVID-19 on 10 March 2020. His funeral was held on 12 March.

== Role in Cinema Rex fire ==
Alireza Nourizadeh, who met with SAVAK heads after Cinema Rex fire, quoted that Kiavash was the middle person between Najaf clerics and Hossein Takbalizadeh, who was later executed for the arson. Cinema Rex fire triggered the overthrow of the Shah and success of the Islamic Revolution of Iran.
