= National Liberation Movement of Ahwaz =

Arab separatist group in Iran

- Secretary general: Khazaal Hashemi
- Founded: 6 December 1982
- Ideology: Pan-Arabism; Arab nationalism
- Wars: Arab separatism in Khuzestan
- Website: www.al-ahwaz.org

The National Liberation Movement of Ahwaz (Arabic: حركة التحرير الوطني الأحوازي, romanized: Harakit al-Taḥrīr al-Watani Al-Ahwazi; abbreviated NLMA) is an Arab nationalist and separatist organization whose goal is to establish an independent state called Ahwaz in Iran.

== History ==
The National Liberation Movement of Ahwaz (NLMA) is an Ahwazi Arab secessionist organization founded by Khaz’al-Hashemi and Sayyed Taher Al Sayyed Na’ma. Established on December 6th 1982. The organization advocates for the separation of Ahwaz from Iran and is described as having a predominantly pan-Arab nationalist orientation, rather than a religious fundamentalist one.

== Operations ==
The movement has carried out attacks across Khuzestan; carrying bombs and attacking government officials throughout. It carried 13 attacks in 2005.

== See also ==
- Arab Struggle Movement for the Liberation of Ahvaz
- Democratic Revolutionary Front for the Liberation of Arabistan
- Ahvaz National Resistance
