= Ahmad Mola Nissi =

- احمد ملا نیسی

Secretary General Arab Struggle Movement for the Liberation of Ahwaz
- In office 2005–2017
- Preceded by: Position created
- Succeeded by: Saddam Hattem

Personal details
- Born: 8 May 1965 Shushtar, Iran
- Died: 8 November 2017 (aged 52) Iran
- Party: Arab Struggle Movement for the Liberation of Ahwaz
- Children: 3

Ahmad Mola Nissi was an Arab-Iranian politician and founder of the Arab Struggle Movement for the Liberation of Ahwaz who was assassinated in The Hague on November 8, 2017.

== Biography ==
Ahmad Melanisi was born in 1965 in Shushtar, Khuzestan Province, Iran. He founded the Arab Struggle Arab Struggle Movement for the Liberation of Ahwaz in 2005. In the same year, after several military operations, such as bombing oil facilities and attacking several banks, he left Iran with his family and emigrated to the Netherlands via Syria. After a while, he received Dutch citizenship. He first moved to live in Maastricht, and then in 2009, due to lack of security, he moved to The Hague. After leaving Iran, Mola Nissi was labeled a terrorist by the government, and the Iranian government asked Interpol to arrest her and return her to Iran.In exile, she fought against the Iranian government and sought to establish alliances with other organizations opposing the Iranian government and the Pan-Arab movement.

Ahmed Melanisy was shot dead in front of his home in The Hague on November 8, 2017, while returning with two friends from a funeral for a relative.
