= Ahwaz Falcons =

Militant organization in Iran

- صقور الأحواز
- Dates active: 2016—present
- Country: Iran
- Active regions: Khuzestan province
- Ideology: Arab nationalism Arab separatism
- Wars: Arab separatism in Khuzestan; 2026 Iran war

The Ahwaz Falcons (Arabic: صقور الأحواز; Mesopotamian Arabic pronunciation: [sˤu.guːɾ al.ʔaħ.waːz]) are an Arab nationalist and insurgent group active in Khuzestan province, Iran.

== History ==
On 7 July 2016, the Ahwaz Falcons claimed an attack on the second-largest petrochemical complex in the Middle East, in the city of Bandar-e Mahshahr, Iran, then threatened the Iranian government with further military operations targeting sensitive economic and military sites in the Ahwaz region. The group stated that the operation is "a new beginning for fieldwork in the occupied Arab land of Ahwaz", and threatened Iran, warning it "not to continue its crimes against our people and our occupied land of Ahwaz, and we also warn it not to continue its blatant interference in our Arab countries such as Iraq, Syria, Yemen, Bahrain, and Saudi Arabia".

In March 2026, during the 2026 Iran war, the Ahwaz Falcons raided an Islamic Revolutionary Guard Corps base in Ahvaz.
