= Arab separatism in Khuzestan =

Ethnic and political conflict in Iran

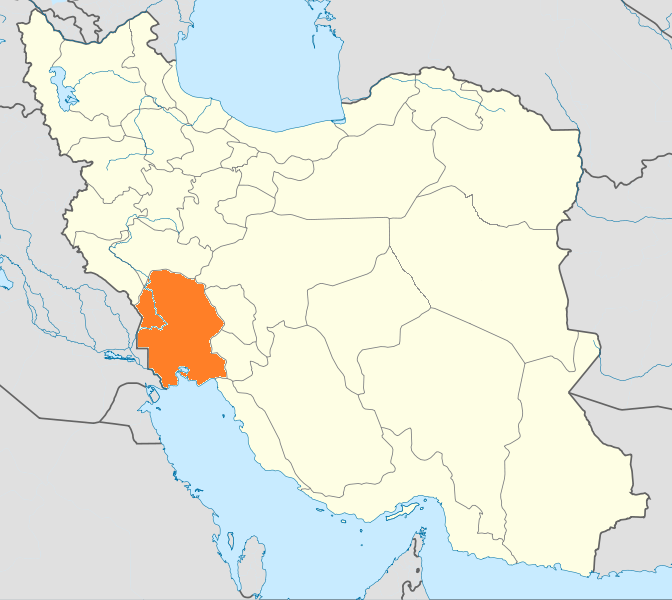
- Location of Khuzestan alongside the other Iranian provinces
Date	1922–present (104 years)
Location	Khuzestan, Bushehr, Bandar Abbas, Iran
Status	Ongoing

Belligerents
Sublime State of Persia (1922–1925)	1922–1924; Emirate of Muhammara
Imperial State of Iran (1925–1979)	1950s–1960s ALF; NFLA
Interim Government and Council of the Islamic Revolution (1979–1980) Islamic Republic of Iran (1980−present)	1979–1980: APCO; DRFLA; PFLA; AFLA; 1998–present: NLMA; Ansar Al-Furqan; ANM; CCAO; ASMLA; Ahwaz Falcons; Ahwaz Freedom Brigades

Commanders and leaders
(Iran) Reza Shah # (Iran) Mohammad Reza Shah # (Iran) Ruhollah Khomeini # (Iran) Ali Khamenei X (Iran) Mostafa Chamran † (Iran) Mojtaba Khamenei (WIA)	Khaz'al al-Ka'bi Oan Ali Mohammed † Habib Jabr al-Ka'bi; Ahmad Mullah Nissi †; Salah Abusharif; Habib Chaab (executed)

Casualties and losses
115+ killed (1922) 55 killed and multiple wounded (1980-2026).	100+ separatists killed.
- 180-260 civilians killed.

In the early 20th century, the growing popularity of Arab nationalism throughout West Asia prompted the emergence of an ongoing separatist movement in Iran's Khuzestan province. It has been marked by periods of general unrest, armed insurgency, rebellions, assassinations, and terrorist attacks. Arabs are a significant ethnic minority in Khuzestan, where they account for 33.6% of the population, as opposed to no more than 4.3% in every other Iranian province. Likewise, the Khuzestani Arabs, who numbered around 1.6 million people in 2010, are the largest community among the Arab citizens of Iran. The movement reemerged during the instability caused by the 2026 Iran war with the group known as the Ahwaz Falcons reemerging alongside a Sunni Arab group known as the Ahwaz Freedom Brigades.

Historically, Khuzestan's land border with Arab-majority Iraq has played a major role in influencing the conflict between the Iranian state and the province's Arab population, particularly when Iraq was ruled by the Arab Socialist Ba'ath Party. A decades-long border dispute between Iran and Iraq was the driving factor behind Iraqi support for Arab separatism in Khuzestan and Iranian support for Kurdish separatism in Iraq, though they briefly reneged upon signing the 1975 Algiers Agreement. Four years later, the Iranian Revolution triggered a Khuzestani Arab uprising, which was suppressed by the Iranian military. During the Iran–Iraq War, which began with the Iraqi invasion of Iran in 1980 and continued until 1988, the Arab separatist movement in Khuzestan was highly active and overtly supported by Iraq. The Iranian Embassy siege in the United Kingdom in early 1980 was carried out by Iranian Arab separatists of the Democratic Revolutionary Front for the Liberation of Arabistan, which also fought alongside the Iraqi military during the Battle of Khorramshahr later that year.

The Iranian government officially denies any discrimination or the existence of a conflict within the country. However, it has drawn strong criticism from some organizations, such as the International Federation for Human Rights, including accusations of discrimination and ethnic cleansing. In addition to the 1979 uprising, flashpoints of the separatist movement include the 2005 Ahvaz unrest, the 2011 protests, and the 2018 Ahvaz military parade attack.

== Demographic background ==
Khuzestan is inhabited by many different ethnic groups including Arabs, Bakhtiari, Kurds, Qashqais, Persians, and Armenians. The majority of Arabs in Khuzestan are Shia Muslims. Both the urban and rural areas of Khuzestan are populated with Arabs, Persians, and Lurs, who often intermarry.

== History ==
=== Sheikh Khazal rebellion ===
Officially within Persian territory, the western region of Khuzestan functioned as an autonomous emirate known as Arabistan for two decades until 1924. From 1922 to 1924, tensions grew due to the rising power of Reza Khan, who later became the Shah of Iran (as Reza Shah), due to his increasingly negative attitude toward tribal autonomies in Iran, his attempts to extract higher taxes, and reduce the authority of Khazal Khan, the Sheikh of Mohammerah and the tribal leader of Arabistan. In response, Sheik Khazal initiated the short-lived Sheikh Khazal rebellion which peaked in November 1924 and was crushed by the newly installed Pahlavi dynasty. At least 115 casualties were sustained. Arabistan was dissolved by Reza Shah's government in 1925, along with other autonomous regions of Persia.

=== 1979 insurgency ===
The 1979 Khuzestan insurgency erupted in the aftermath of the Iranian Revolution, fed by demands of autonomy for Khuzestan. The uprising was quelled by Iranian security forces, resulting in more than a hundred combined casualties from both sides. The Iranian crackdown in response to the uprising provoked the initiation of the Iranian Embassy siege of 1980 in London by an Arab separatist group called the Democratic Revolutionary Front for the Liberation of Arabistan (DRFLA). The terrorists initially demanded autonomy for Khuzestan and later demanded the release of 91 of their comrades held in Iranian jails.

=== Civil unrest and insurgency (1999–present) ===
==== ASMLA establishment ====
In 1999, Habib Yabar, Habib Asewad Kaabi, and Ahmad Mola Nissi established the Arab Struggle Movement for the Liberation of Ahwaz (ASMLA) in Europe to advocate for an independent Arab state in Khuzestan and has committed acts of terrorism and assassinations in support of this goal. The group is financed and sponsored by Saudi Arabia.

==== Civil unrest (2005–2015) ====
On 15 April 2005, civil unrest broke out in Ahvaz and surrounding towns, lasting for four days. Initially, the Iranian Interior Ministry stated that only one person had been killed, but an official at an Ahvaz hospital alleged between 15 and 20 casualties.

Subsequently, a series of bombings were carried out in Ahvaz and other cities in Iran in late 2005 and early 2006, which were blamed upon Sunni Arab separatist groups of Khuzestan.

The 2011 Khuzestan protests, known among protesters as the Ahvaz Day of Rage, erupted on 15 April 2011 in Iranian Khuzestan to mark the anniversary of the 2005 Ahvaz unrest, and as a response to the regional Arab Spring. The protests lasted for four days, resulted in 12 to 15 protesters killed, and many wounded and arrested; one security officer was killed and another wounded. Crackdown on Arab political opposition in the area continued since with arrests and executions. Four Ahwazi men were executed in Iran in June 2012 in relation to the 2011 unrest. The crackdown on Arab Sunni opposition has been condemned by the Human Rights Watch, Amnesty International, and others.

In 2013, bombings were carried out in Ahvaz, alleged to have been committed by the ASMLA.

On 23 March 2015, a football match dispute led to anti-government protests in Ahvaz. Local football fans defiantly expressed support for the Saudi al-Hilal football team during the match and burnt pictures of Ayatollah Ruhollah Khomeini, the late Iranian spiritual leader who led the 1979 Iranian revolution. The opposition National Council of Resistance of Iran said that fans further carried banners declaring that "We are all Younes," a reference to a street vendor who immolated himself a few days before the match in the nearby city of Khorramshahr. In parallel, Iran's state-run Press TV broadcast confessions of captured ASMLA members who said they had carried out scores of attacks. An Arab protester was killed by Iranian security forces during the events.

On 2 April 2015, three Iranian officers were killed by unidentified gunmen in the city of Hamidiyeh, about 25 kilometers (15 miles) west of the city of Ahvaz.

==== 2016 ====
In early June 2016, a Sunni group known as Suqour al-Ahvaz (transl. Hawks of Ahvaz) blew up the Bou-Ali-Sina Petrochemical Complex in Bandar-E Mahshahr, Khuzestan.

In July 2016, Ahwazi militants of the al-Farouq Brigade of the Ahwazi National Resistance blew up pipelines in the Johar as-Sabaa' district on two occasions. Reportedly, members of the al-Farouq Brigade managed to escape after the operation despite the efforts of the security forces and Revolutionary Guards. According to Algemeiner, the group responsible for the 11 and 17 July attacks was Suqour al-Ahvaz.

In August 2016, Iran executed three men charged with committing an attack in April 2015 which led to the death of three Iranian policemen in Khuzestan province.

In October 2016, a young girl was killed when Iranian security forces attempted to arrest her father.

==== 2017 ====
In early April 2017, an Ahwazi activist was killed by Basij militia in Ma’shour city. In October 2017, Ahmad Mullah Nissi, head of the Arab Struggle Movement for Khuzestan, was assassinated in the Netherlands.

==== 2018 ====
Massive demonstrations erupted in Khuzestan in April 2018, spreading from Ahwaz to several large cities of the province. Ten people were reportedly killed in a fire during one of those demonstrations, which was blamed on Iranian intelligence services by the protesters.

On 22 September 2018, a group of terrorists opened fire on an Islamic Revolutionary Guard Corps parade, killing 25 soldiers and civilians in Ahvaz. The Ahvaz National Resistance, an umbrella organization of all armed separatist movements, claimed responsibility for the terror attack. The Ahvaz National Resistance and the Islamic State of Iraq and the Levant also claimed responsibility for the attack. The Iranian government blamed ISIL for the attack and retaliated.

==== 2021 ====
On 15 July 2021, massive riots erupted in Khuzestan fueled by water supply issues. Human Rights Activists News Agency (HRANA) identified 6 victims and at least 171 people arrested during the events.

==== 2022 ====
In November 2022, at 4–5 people were killed and 15 wounded in the province of Khuzestan in what Iranian state media described as a terrorist attack. Two members of the Basij militia were among the dead. The violence erupted as Iran's ethnic Arab minority, who mostly live in Khuzestan, have joined weeks of massive protests triggered by the death Iranian woman Mahsa Amini earlier on September.

==== 2026 ====
The Ahwaz Falcons had raided an IRGC base and seized weapons without suffering casualties, as another group named the Ahwaz Freedom Brigades had announced a rebellion and called on all of Ahwaz to join the rebellion.

== Casualties ==
Total estimate: 342–501 killed (1922–2020):

- 1922–1924: 115+ killed during Sheikh Khazal rebellion
- 1979: 25–112 killed during 1979 Khuzestan insurgency
- 1980: 7 killed during the Iranian Embassy siege in London
- 2005: 1–50 killed during 2005 Ahvaz unrest
- 2005–2006: 28+ killed in Ahvaz bombings
- 2011: 13–16 killed in 2011 Khuzestan protests
- 2012: 4 executed in response to the 2011 protests by Iran
- 2015: 6 killed in three incidents
- 2016: 1 killed, 3 executed
- 2017: 4 killed
- 2018: 10–39 killed
- 2019: 91+ killed
- 2020: 34+ killed
- 2021: 6 killed
- 2022: 4-5 killed up to 23
- 2026: Unknown

== Human rights issues ==
Minorities at Risk (MAR), a university-based research project has stated that Arabs in Khuzestan have experienced discrimination.

== Arab organizations ==
Arab organizations in Khuzestan were divided into two camps: those seek a separate state, and those who sought regional autonomy within a federal Iran. Critics of these parties claim that separatism has no support among Arabs, and point to the decision by many Iranian Arabs to defend Iran during the Iran–Iraq War. The support shown by Iranian Arabs may have been a result of the knowledge of Shia Muslims in Saddam's Iraq. Critics also contend that separatism has always been instigated by foreign governments – particularly the British – to weaken Iran to control the country's natural resources and extend external influence over the Middle East.

=== Ahwaz Liberation Organization ===
The Ahwaz Liberation Organization (ALO), based in Maastricht in the Netherlands, was formed from the remnants of three Iraqi-backed groups – the Democratic Revolutionary Front for the Liberation of Arabistan (DRFLA), People's Front for Liberation of Arabistan (PFLA), and the Arab Front for the Liberation of Al-Ahwaz (AFLA). The ALO is a secular pan-Arabist group seeking independence from Iran. The DRFLA was the most notorious of the precursor groups, having been sponsored by Saddam Hussein.

The ALO was founded after the newly installed Islamic government fired on Arab demonstrators in Khorramshahr, killing many of them. The DRFLA was behind the May 1980 Iranian Embassy Siege in London, taking several hostages to draw attention to its demands for the self-determination of the Arab population of Khuzestan. The British Special Air Service (SAS) stormed the building and freed the hostages. Fowzi Badavi Nejad, the only survivor of that group, survived only because some of the embassy hostages had put themselves between him and the SAS soldiers. Some evidence indicated the Iraqi intelligence services had duped Nejad into taking part in the siege. Evidence showed that once he knew the true nature of the group's plans, he only continued because he feared for his family, who had fled from Iran to Iraq.

The ALO's constituent groups operated as a mercenary force on behalf of Saddam's regime during the Iran–Iraq War, and carried out assassinations and attacked oil facilities. Bomb attacks on oil and power facilities have continued since the end of the Iraq War, although the ALO has not formally claimed responsibility. The ALO's leader, the self-styled "President of Al-Ahwaz" Faleh Abdallah Al-Mansouri, has been living in exile in the Netherlands since 1989, shortly after the end of the Iran–Iraq War, and has Dutch citizenship. He has declared himself to be the "President" of Al-Ahwaz, which he claimed extends beyond Khuzestan, and includes much of the coast of Iran. However, during a visit to Syria in May 2006, he was arrested along with Iranian Arabs who were registered as refugees by the UNHCR.

== See also ==
- Emirate of Arabistan
- Politics of Khuzestan Province
- List of modern conflicts in the Middle East
