= Ahvaz military parade attack =

2018 terrorist attack in Iran

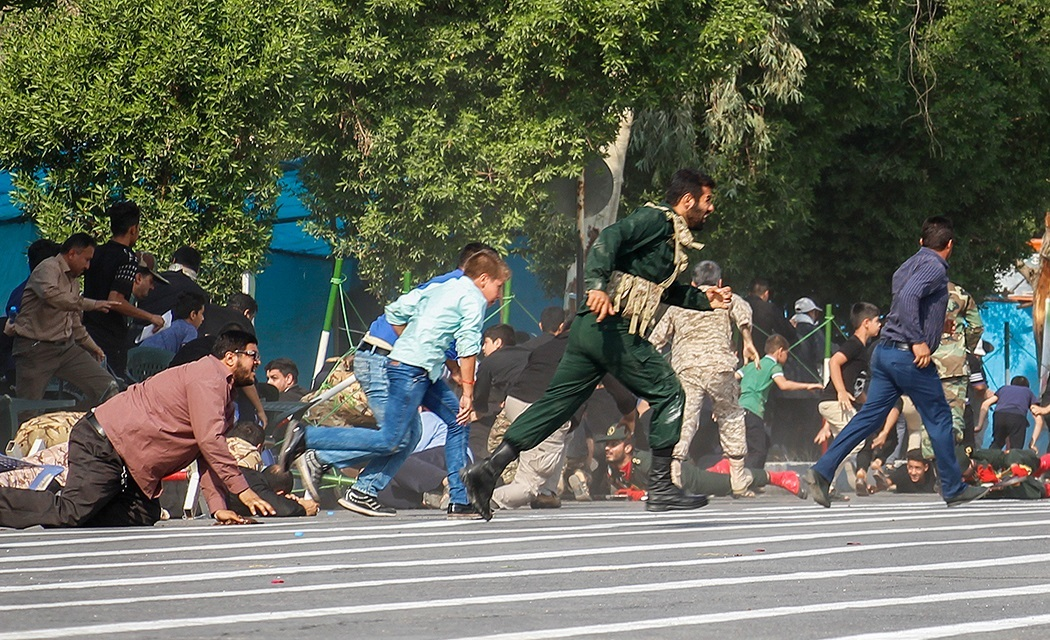
- Civilians and soldiers fleeing during the attack
- Location: 31°20′8″N 48°38′38″E; Ahvaz, Khuzestan province, Iran
- Date: 22 September 2018; 09:00–09:10 (Iran Standard Time)
- Target: Civilians and IRGC soldiers
- Attack type: Mass shooting
- Deaths: 30 (25 victims, 5 attackers)
- Injuries: 70
- Perpetrators: Islamic State of Iraq and the Levant (claimed responsibility); Arab Struggle Movement for the Liberation of Ahwaz (initially claimed responsibility, later denied; accused by Iran)
- No. of participants: 5

Site of attack

On 22 September 2018, a military parade was attacked by gunmen in the southwestern Iranian city of Ahvaz. The shooters killed 25 people, including soldiers of the Islamic Revolutionary Guard Corps (IRGC) and civilian bystanders. It was the deadliest terrorist attack in Iran since the Chabahar suicide bombing in December 2010.

The Islamic State claimed responsibility for the attack and released purported photos of the attackers. Iran blamed "militants in Syria" and claimed the "U.S. and the Gulf states enabled the attack" and vowed revenge. The American defense secretary dismissed Iran's threat and denied U.S. involvement, saying it was "ludicrous" for Iran to allege U.S. involvement. Saudi Arabia and the United Arab Emirates also rejected and condemned the accusation. A splinter group of the Arab Struggle Movement for the Liberation of Ahwaz initially claimed responsibility, but later denied involvement.

On 1 October 2018, in retaliation for the attacks, Iranian Revolutionary Guards fired missiles and carried out drone attacks in Abu Kamal of Syria targeting "militants in Syria it blamed for an attack", Sepah News reported.

== Attack ==
The parade was part of an annual commemoration known as the Sacred Defence Week commemorating the start of the Iran–Iraq War in 1980. It included the Islamic Revolutionary Guard Corps marching along Quds Boulevard in Ahvaz. Five gunmen began shooting at the parade from a nearby park on 22 September 2018 at 09:00 local time, wearing military uniforms and disguised as Islamic Revolutionary Guards Corps and Basiji (volunteers); they also targeted a viewing stand and civilian bystanders. The attack lasted about ten minutes.

== Casualties ==
The attackers killed 25 people, including 12 soldiers of the Islamic Revolutionary Guard Corps and a four-year-old boy, with 70 others left wounded, including children. Many were taken to hospital in critical condition. However, according to CNN, at least 29 people died in the Ahvaz military parade attack.

Initial reports conflicted; Iranian state media said all four assailants had been killed, while local deputy governor Ali Hosein Hoseinzadeh said two were arrested. According to senior spokesman Brigadier General Abolfazl Shekarchi, senior spokesman for Iran's armed forces, "All four terrorists were quickly neutralised by security forces". Iran news agency's reports showed that three out of the four assailants were shot dead during the attack whereas the fourth died shortly later in the hospital, according to The Guardian. In a subsequent report, Fars News Agency said a fifth assailant was also killed but was initially mixed up with the victims.

== Responsibility ==
Iranian state media initially reported that "takfiri gunmen" executed the assault.

Two groups claimed responsibility for the terrorist attack, including Arab separatist militant group the Arab Struggle Movement for the Liberation of Ahwaz (ASMLA) and the Islamic State of Iraq and the Levant (ISIL). ASMLA then decided to deny responsibility for the attack.

=== Timeline of responsibility claims ===
22 September

The claim of responsibility was first made through Iran International TV by Yaqoub al-Tostari, the spokesperson for the ASMLA who spoke to the television on air, on the same day. He said the attack was conducted "because of the establishment's tyranny against Ahvazis". Al-Tostari also told Reuters that 'Ahvaz National Resistance' (ANR), which he described as an umbrella organization of all armed movements, was behind the attack. ANR is identified as a name used by the ASMLA. Habib Jaber al-Ka'abi, an ASMLA leader based in Denmark, tweeted in support for the attack and said it was against a "legitimate target".

Amaq News Agency claimed that the Islamic State of Iraq and the Levant was responsible and posted videos of three men discussing the upcoming attack. Two spoke Arabic and one spoke Persian.

Following the claim by ISIL, Yaqoub al-Tostari who spoke with Al Arabiya television as the ASMLA spokesperson said the ISIL involvement is false, adding that "The commando operation was carried out by the Ahzavi resistance movement. Civilians were killed as a result of indiscriminate gunfire from Iranian security forces", as quoted by BBC Monitoring on 22 September 2018 at 16:17 (GMT).

23 September

A statement on the ASMLA website on 23 September denied responsibility for the attack, saying that the claim was made by a "group that was expelled from the organization since 2015". The denial happened after Iranian foreign ministry summoned the ambassadors of Denmark and the Netherlands in Tehran and protested them for hosting ASMLA.

26 September

On 26 September, ISIL's Al Furqan Media Foundation, which publishes official announcements from ISIL leaders, published an audio statement titled "The Muwahhidin's Assault on the Tower of the Mushrikin" from spokesman Abul-Hasan Al-Muhajir, which claimed "A group of men of the Khilafah and guardians of the creed in the land of Persia have pounced in defense of the religion, acting to deter and suppress their enemy and to fulfill the Islamic State's promise to all who have the blood of Ahlus Sunnah on their hands."

27 September

On 27 September, ISIL's newspaper al-Naba released what it claimed were photos of the five masked attackers.

== Reactions ==
The Supreme Leader of Iran, Ali Khamenei, wrote on his website: "This crime is a continuation of the plots of the regional states that are puppets of the United States, and their goal is to create insecurity in our dear country." He also called on security forces to bring those responsible to justice. Iran's Ministry of Foreign Affairs asked the governments of the Netherlands, the United Kingdom and Denmark to "condemn the attack and extradite people linked to it to Iran to be put on trial." British ambassador to Iran Rob Macaire condemned the attack and sent his nation's condolences to the victims' families.

On 23 September, the Iranian ministry summoned the United Arab Emirates' chargé d'affaires in Iran over a tweet made by Emirati professor Abdulkhaleq Abdulla about the attack which said: "A military attack against a military target is not a terrorist act and moving the battle to the Iranian side is a declared option". Iran's Foreign Ministry spokesman Bahram Qassemi said that Abdulla's comments were "irresponsible and thoughtless" and "could hold Abu Dhabi accountable". Khamenei alleged that the people responsible for the attack were paid by Saudi Arabia and the UAE. The UAE has denied Iranian allegations that it had any links with the attack.

Russian President Vladimir Putin said that he was horrified and presented his condolences, while the Syrian Ministry of Foreign Affairs strongly condemned the attack and warned those who finance terrorism in the region. Pakistan also condemned the attack through their foreign office's spokesman Mohammad Faisal.

President of the Presidium of the Supreme People's Assembly of North Korea Kim Yong-nam had presented his condolences.

== Aftermath ==
=== Arrests ===
On 24 September, Minister of Intelligence Mahmoud Alavi said that most of the persons behind the attack had been arrested. The Iranian intelligence ministry disclosed that 22 people attributed to the attack have been arrested, according to the BBC. The United Nations Security Council issued a statement condemning the terrorist attack and calling for the perpetrators to be brought to justice. General Hossein Salami of the Revolutionary Guard called Saudi Arabia, Israel, and the United States the "evil triangle". He said, "We warn all of those behind the story, we will take revenge."

=== Funerals ===
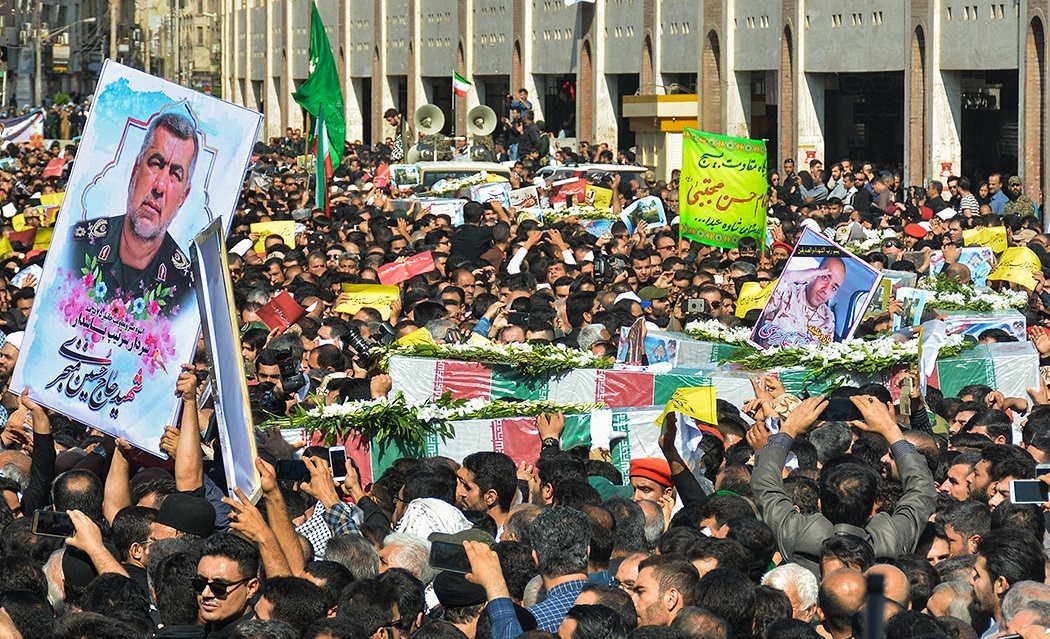
Mourners grieve before coffins of victims wrapped in the flags of Iran.

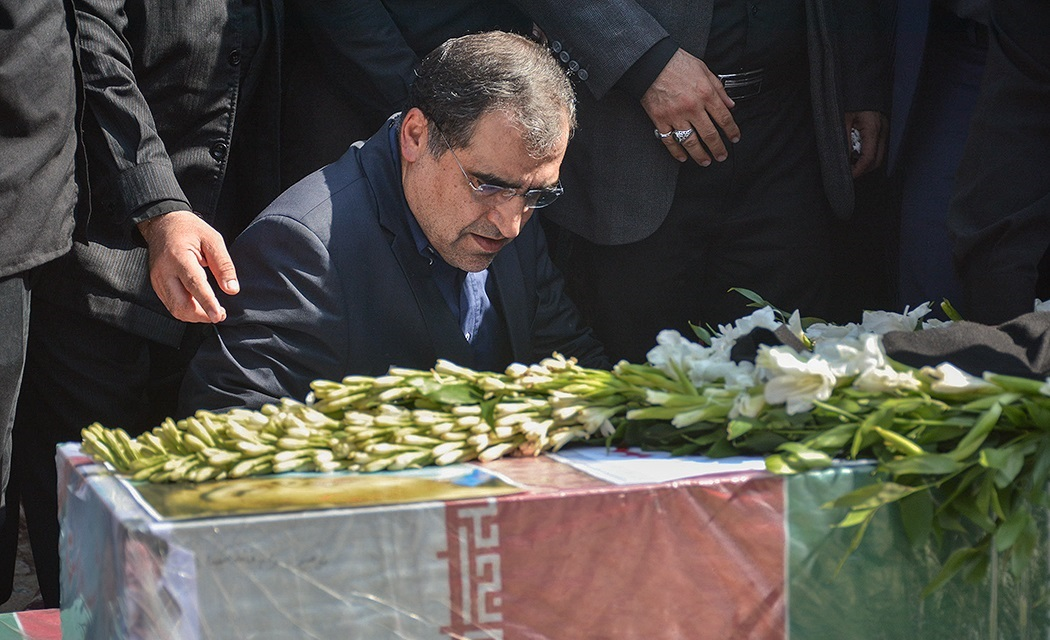
Hassan Ghazizadeh Hashemi, minister of Health and Medical Education of Iran

Thousands of Iranians attended a funeral for the victims on 24 September near Ahvaz's Sarallah Hussainiya. Some waved Iranian flags and held photographs of the victims. The funeral was described by ABC News as "a collective outpouring of grief."

=== Retaliatory missile and drone strikes ===
Six Zulfiqar and Qiam missiles were launched on 1 October by the Aerospace Force of the Islamic Revolutionary Guard Corps.

According to Fars News Agency, at least one missile was adorned with the slogans "death to America", "death to Israel" and "death to Al Saud". The attack was described as revenge for the people of Ahvaz. Brigadier Amir Ali Hajizadeh, head of the Aerospace Force of the Islamic Revolutionary Guard Corps, claimed that 40 "top leaders" of the Islamic State of Iraq and the Levant were killed in the attack. But according to Colonel Sean Ryan, spokesman for the US-led Combined Joint Task Force – Operation Inherent Resolve, the attack did no damage at all.

=== Controversial video ===
Fars News Agency, described by news media to be a "semi-official" news agency of the Government of Iran, published a video threatening the capitals of Saudi Arabia and the United Arab Emirates with missile attacks by showing a graphic video of rifle scope closing in into the two cities. The video was published as Khamenei blamed Riyadh and Abu Dhabi for the attack. The video was shared on Twitter, but was later taken down.

=== Execution of Farajollah Cha'ab ===
On 6 May 2023, Habib Farajollah Chaab, a leader of the Arab Struggle Movement for the Liberation of Ahwaz, was executed by hanging after being accused of masterminding the attack. Tobias Billström, the Swedish Foreign Minister, reacted with "dismay" to the execution of Cha'ab, who was a Swedish-Iranian dual national. Sweden summoned Ahmad Masoumifar, Iran's acting ambassador to Sweden, in protest of the execution.

== See also ==
- 2017 Tehran attacks
- 2018 in Iran
- List of terrorist incidents in September 2018
