= 2005–06 Ahvaz bombings =

Terrorist attack in Iran

Ahvaz bombings
- Part of Arab separatism in Khuzestan
- Location: Ahvaz, Iran
- Date: sporadically from 12 June 2005 to 3 March 2006
- Target: various government and public buildings
- Attack type: bombings
- Deaths: at least 28
- Injuries: at least 225
- Perpetrator: responsibility claimed by the Ahvazi Revolutionary Martyrs' Brigades
- Motive: Alleged retaliation for suppression of 2005 Ahvaz unrest

The Ahvaz bombings were a series of bomb explosions that took place mostly in Ahvaz, Iran, in 2005 and 2006, and were blamed on Ahvaz separatist organizations of Arabs. The bombings were linked to the violent '15 April unrest' in Ahvaz, before the bombings. Some 28 people were killed, and 225 were wounded in the Ahvaz bombings.

== Background ==
The region of Khuzestan has continued to suffer from periodical violent disruptions since the suppression of the Sheikh Khazal rebellion in 1925.

In 2005, a wide scale unrest broke out in Ahvaz and the surrounding towns. The unrest erupted on 15 April 2005 and lasted for 4 days. Initially, the Iranian Interior Ministry stated that only one person had been killed; however, an official at a hospital in Ahvaz said that between 15 and 20 mortal casualties had occurred.

== The bombings ==
=== 12 June 2005 ===
The bombs in Ahvaz exploded over a two-hour period, four bombs have exploded, killing at least 11 people and wounding more than 87 others, days before the presidential election. One of the bombs exploded outside the governor-general's headquarters. Two went off near government offices, and a fourth exploded near the home of a local state television executive. Two hours later, a bomb exploded in the capital, Tehran, killing two people. Three other bombs were defused. According to the LA Times, the provincial governor of Khuzestan disclosed that several of the victims were women and children. Iran's Interior Ministry claimed that the bombings were meant to strike fear into Iranians to stop them from voting, according to The New York Times.

"These terrorists have been trained under the umbrella of the Americans in Iraq," The Iranian top national security official Ali Agha Mohammadi said. The Arab People's Democratic Front and The Armed Renaissance Group of Ahvaz all claimed responsibility for the bombings.

=== 15 October 2005 ===
Two bomb blasts hit a shopping center, killing at least six people and injuring up to 100. The attacks, a few minutes apart, took place near an area attacked by several bombs in June. The bombs were planted in rubbish bins. The blasts occurred shortly before dusk as shoppers crowded to buy food for the evening meal that breaks the daily fast during the Muslim holy month of Ramadan. According to Al Jazeera, two Arab separatists accused of carrying out the attack were executed by hanging.

=== 25 January 2006 ===
At least nine people were killed, and 48 were injured in two blasts. One bomb had exploded in the Kianpars area, inside the Saman Bank, and had killed at least 9 people and wounded 45 others; the second explosion took place on Golestan Road next to the Natural Resources Department, a state environmental agency, causing injuries but no deaths. Iranian President Mahmoud Ahmadinejad was due to give a speech at a religious centre nearby, but the visit had been cancelled due to bad weather. Mr Ahmadinejad's media chief said he did not believe the bombs were linked to the planned visit, because there had been a series of similar blasts last year.

"Our heroes... in the military wing of The Arab Struggle Movement for the Liberation of Ahvaz attacked and destroyed the dens of the occupying enemy," a statement posted on an Arab separatist organisation website said.

However, the Iranian Foreign Minister has blamed the UK for working together with the attackers responsible for the death of eight people in Ahvaz, according to the BBC. Iranian authorities arrested at least 50 suspects for the bombings.

=== 27 February 2006 ===
Two bombs exploded in the Iranian cities of Dezful and Abadan. In both cities, the devices were planted in the governor's offices. Three injuries were reported. According to ABC News, the twin bombs did affect the Iranian oil refinery in Abadan.

=== 2 March 2006 ===
A bomb exploded hours after two men were hanged for a bomb blast. The percussion bomb shattered the windows of a building in the Kianpars area on Thursday evening, but no casualties were reported.

== Aftermath ==
At least 19 Arab Iranians have been executed since the 2005 Ahvaz unrest and the consequent bombings. In April 2011, another wave of protests erupted across the Khuzestan province, resulting in a dozen killed, scores injured, and scores arrested.

== Perpetrators ==
The Iranian government has pointed the blame for the bomb attacks on several groups and foreign governments. The government initially blamed the Mujahideen-e-Khalq (MeK) and the separatist Ahwazi Arab Peoples Democratic Popular Front (ADPF). Both groups denied responsibility. At least three Arab groups claimed responsibility for the June bombings, including the Canada-based Party of the Ahwaz Arab Renaissance Party (AARP) (aka Hizba al-Nahdah al-Arabi al-Ahwazi). Sabah al-Musawi of AARP - which was created in Damascus by the Syrian Ba'ath Party - also appeared to justify the killing of civilians, stating: "These people came from outside Ahvaz. These are settlers.... They came to Ahvaz, and they must bear the consequences. The regime must bear its responsibilities towards the people it brought as settlers to Ahwaz." The AARP had claimed responsibility for an attack on the Abadan-Ma'shuur pipeline in May 2005.

According to Radio Free Europe/Radio Liberty, British Ahwazi Friendship Society (BAFS) spokesman Nasser Bani-Assad dismissed the claims of responsibility by various foreign-based separatist groups, alleging that they did not have the ability to carry out an attack and were seeking publicity and notoriety. In a statement on the BAFS website, Bani-Assad said:

If you want to know who is behind the attacks, you only have to think about who would benefit the most - and it is not the Arabs. Certainly, the more extreme hard-line elements of the Iranian establishment will benefit greatly from the nationalist and religious fervour and anti-Arab sentiments that will arise as a result of these bomb attacks.

Presidential candidate Mostafa Moeen also suggested that those responsible for the Ahvaz attacks were also linked to similar attacks in Tehran and Zahedan. In an interview with the Guardian newspaper, Moeen suggested that the violence could have been aimed at encouraging people to vote for a hardline militarist candidate. When asked by the Guardian whether the attacks had the government's approval, he said: "I do not consider it improbable."

=== Alleged UK, US involvement ===
The oil-rich Khuzestan province, which is home to about two million ethnic Arabs, was rocked by a wave of unrest in April 2005. Iran accused British army forces across the border in southern Iraq of co-operating with bombers who carried out January's attacks in Ahvaz. The UK Foreign Office rejected the allegation.

In the months after the June 2005 attacks, government officials and the pro-government media alleged that the UK, US, Canada, Saudi Arabia, and the Shell Oil Company all had a role in the bombings, but none published any conclusive evidence. Despite claiming to have arrested those responsible for the attacks, no one has been charged or put on trial.

Following the October attacks, the head of the judiciary for Khuzestan province, Sayyed Khalil Akbar al-Sadat, blamed "British spies," while the conservative Kayhan newspaper claimed the terrorists were "British soldiers." Deputy Interior Minister Mohammad Hossein Mousapour told state-run Mehr news agency:

Most probably, those involved in the explosion were British agents who were involved in the previous incidents in Ahvaz and Khuzestan.

The British Embassy in Tehran denied any responsibility in a statement released after the attacks:

There has been speculation in the past about alleged British involvement in Khuzestan. We reject these allegations. Any linkage between the British Government and these terrorist outrages is completely without foundation.

Various officials repeated the claim of British involvement, repeating that they had reliable intelligence and confessions from those arrested after the attacks. However, no one has been tried in connection with the attacks. Senior members of the Bawi (Bavi) tribe were arrested, and two were sentenced to death, but it is not known whether this is in connection with the attacks.

U.S. agents have allegedly been working in Iran with anti-government groups. According to Seymour Hersh of The New Yorker: "[T]eams of American combat troops have been ordered into Iran, under cover, to collect targeting data and to establish contact with anti-government ethnic-minority groups."

== See also ==
- Iran–Iraq War
- 2007 Zahedan bombing
- Cinema Rex Fire
- Terrorism in Iran
