= Eyleh-ye Yek =

Village in Khuzestan, Iran

Eyleh-ye Yek عیله یک
- Village
- Location within Iran
- Coordinates: 31°53′44″N 48°37′52″E
- Country: Iran
- Province: Khuzestan
- County: Shushtar
- Bakhsh: Shadravan
- Rural District: Shoaybiyeh-ye Gharbi

Population (2006)
  - Total: 472
- Time zone: UTC+3:30 (IRST)
  - Summer (DST): UTC+4:30 (IRDT)

Eyleh-ye Yek (Persian: عیله یک, also Romanized as ‘Eyleh-ye Yek; also known as ‘Asīleh-e Yek and Sheykh Hādī) is a village in Shoaybiyeh-ye Gharbi Rural District, Shadravan District, Shushtar County, Khuzestan Province, Iran. At the 2006 census, its population was 472, in 89 families. It is a desert region that reaches temperatures of up to 48 degrees Celsius and has an annual rain fall of 363 mm.
