= Janie Leatherman =

Janie L. Leatherman (born 1959) is an international relations scholar from the United States. She is a Professor of Politics and International Studies at Fairfield University. Her publications encompass conflict early warning and prevention, conflict transformation, and peace building, which work is cited in the development of the international principle and doctrine on the Responsibility to Protect. In addition, her scholarship has contributed to the normative understanding of peace building, and the exercise of discipline and punitive power in international affairs, including in the global political economy of sexual violence and armed conflict, and its gendered dimensions.

== Early life ==
Leatherman was born in Toledo, Ohio, and raised in the Church of the Brethren. Leatherman attended Manchester University in Indiana, graduating summa cum laude with a BA in Spanish and in Peace Studies. She also completed two years of undergraduate study at the University of Barcelona through the Brethren Colleges Abroad (BCA) program, and served as an Assistant to the BCA Director from 1982–1983.

Leatherman received her MA and PhD summa cum laude in International Studies in 1985 and 1991, respectively, from the Josef Korbel School of International Studies, the University of Denver. During that time she was recipient of a 1985–1986 West German Government post-graduate fellowship sponsored by the University of Tübingen’s Peace Research Group (Arbeitsgruppe Friedensforschung/AGFF) at the Institute of Political Science. She also received dissertation fellowships in 1987–88 from the American Scandinavian Foundation and Fulbright Hayes to Finland. There she researched the neutral and non-aligned states third party mediation in the Conferences on Security and Cooperation in Europe (CSCE). She continued this research throughout the 1990s, and in 2003 published a major study on the transformation of the Cold War, titled From Cold War to Democratic Peace: Third Parties, Peaceful Change and the OSCE (Syracuse University Press).

Her post-doctoral studies also included a fellowship from the Swedish government for research at the Swedish Institute for International Affairs in 1994 focused on early warning and conflict prevention. From 1992–1997, she was a visiting fellow at the Joan B. Kroc Institute for International Peace Studies, the University of Notre Dame, where she collaborated with colleagues on projects related to conflict early warning and prevention in consultation with Catholic Relief Services. She also participated in the South Balkans Working Group at the Center for Preventive Action in the Council on Foreign Relations (New York), authoring a background study on conflict prevention in the former Yugoslav Republic of Macedonia, and contributing to the Track II mission and report that led to the first comprehensive, and regional framework for peace in the South Balkans, released in a 1996 publication, Toward Comprehensive Peace in Southeast Europe: Conflict Prevention in the South Balkans, edited by Barnett Rubin (New York: Twentieth Century Fund).

== Career ==
Leatherman has served as a trainer and consultant in conflict resolution for a number of other national and international institutions, including the U.S. Ambassador-at-Large for War Crimes, the United Nations University (UNU), Catholic Relief Services, Search for Common Ground, the Brookings Institution, and for various track II peacebuilding workshops. She has held faculty appointments at Macalester College 1989–91 and Illinois State University from 1997–2006, where she was also the Director of International Affairs for the College of Arts and Sciences from 2005–2006, Co-Director of Peace Studies from 1999–2006, and Director of Model UN from 1999–2006. She also served as Director of Brethren Colleges Abroad and taught at the University of Barcelona from 1991–1992.

Leatherman has received numerous grants from national and international sources, including the United States Agency for International Development, United States Institute of Peace, United States Department of Education, the Social Science Research Council, the Association of Colleges and Universities, and the Pew Charitable Trusts.

== Publications ==
Leatherman's publications include

- Leatherman, Janie (2011). Sexual Violence and Armed Conflict. Polity. ISBN 978-0745658360.
- Leatherman, Janie, ed. (2008). Discipline and Punishment in Global Politics: Illusions of Control. Palgrave Macmillan. ISBN 9780230605848.
- Leatherman, Janie (2003). From Cold War to Democratic Peace: Third Parties, Peaceful Change, and the OSCE. Syracuse University Press. ISBN 978-0815630074.
- Leatherman, Janie; DeMars, William; Gaffney, Patrick; Vayrynen, Raimo (1999). Breaking Cycles of Violence: Conflict Prevention in Intrastate Crises. Kumarian Press. ISBN 978-1565490925.

== Awards ==
Leatherman has received a number of awards recognizing her work in curriculum and teaching, including the 2010 International Education Faculty Achievement Award, recognizing extraordinary achievement in curriculum development and teaching to prepare world citizens, conferred by the International Association of University Presidents. She was inducted into the Golden Key International Society as an Honorary Member in 2000.
