= Mansouri oil field =

Oil field in Iran

- Location within Iran
- Country: Iran
- Region: Khuzestan Province
- Offshore/onshore: Onshore
- Coordinates: 30°36′22″N 48°37′34″E
- Operators: NISOC
- Partners: NIOC

Field history
- Discovery: 1963
- Start of production: 1974

Production
- Current production of oil: 110,000 barrels per day (~5.5×10^{6} t/a)
- Estimated oil in place: 3,300 million barrels (~4.5×10^{8} t)

The Mansouri oil field is an oil field located in southwest Iran and 45 km southeast of Ahvaz city. It was discovered in 1963, and the production was started after installing production facilities in 1974. Oil production of Mansouri field is about 110,000 barrels per day (17,000 m^{3}/d). Its oil reserves have been estimated at 3.3 bn barrels. The field is owned by state-owned National Iranian Oil Company (NIOC) and operated by National Iranian South Oil Company (NISOC).

== See also ==
- List of oil fields
