= Ahmad Masoumifar =

Iranian diplomat

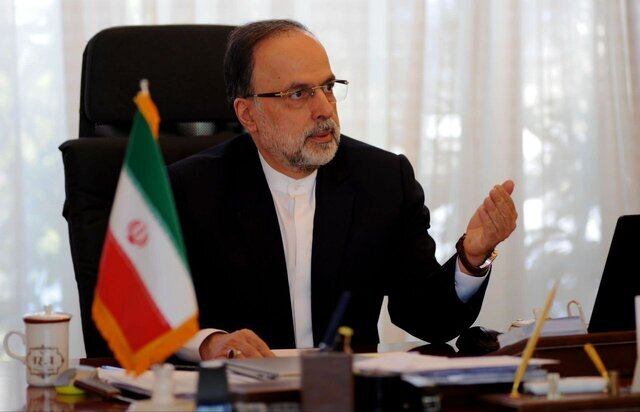
- Ahmad Masoumifar during his ambassadorship to Sweden (Mehr News Agency)

Ambassador of Iran to the Kingdom of Sweden
- In office February 2020 – 2023
- President: Hassan Rouhani Ebrahim Raisi
- Preceded by: Rasoul Mohajer Hejazi
- Succeeded by: Hojjatollah Faghani

Director General for Economic Affairs, Ministry of Foreign Affairs.
- In office 2017–2020
- Preceded by: Fereydoun Haghbin
- Succeeded by: Sayed Rasoul Mohajer

Iranian Ambassador to South Korea
- In office January 2011 – August 2014
- Preceded by: Mohammad Reza Bakhtiari
- Succeeded by: Hassan Taherian

Personal details
- Born: 26 October 1961 (age 64) Iran
- Children: 2
- Education: University of Tehran
- Occupation: Diplomat

Ahmad Masoumifar (Persian: احمد معصومی‌فر; born 21 March 1961) is an Iranian career diplomat who served as the Iranian Ambassador to the Kingdom of Sweden. He previously served as the Iranian Ambassador to South Korea. Within the Ministry of Foreign Affairs, he has held several senior economic roles, including Director General for Economic Affairs and Secretary of Iran’s Foreign Economic Relations Coordination Committee.

Masoumifar was educated at the University of Tehran. He holds a master's in development economics and a Doctorate in business administration. Masoumifar joined the Ministry of Foreign Affairs in 1986.

Over the course of his diplomatic career, Masoumifar has served in a variety of international postings, including as Iran’s Consul General to Shanghai, chargé d'affaires in Kuala Lumpur, Ambassador to South Korea, and Ambassador to Sweden.

His previous roles within the Ministry of Foreign Affairs include, Head of Investments and Special Economic Plans Department, Head of the Office of Economic Cooperation with the Americas, Deputy Director General of Economic Affairs, and Director General for Economic Affairs and the Secretary of Iran’s Foreign Economic Relations Coordination Committee.
