= Cinema Rex fire =

1978 Islamic terror attack in Abadan, Iran

Coordinates: 30.3349°N 48.2830°E

- Part of the Iranian Revolution
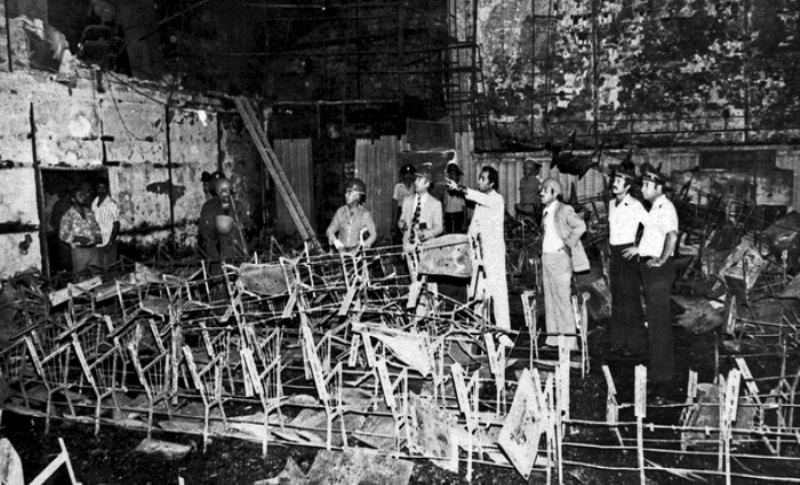
- Interior of the Cinema Rex building after the fire
- Native name: آتش‌سوزی سینما رکس آبادان
- Location: Abadan, Iran
- Date: 19 August 1978; 20:21 (IRST)
- Attack type: Arson, mass murder, terrorism
- Deaths: 377–470 killed
- Perpetrator: Islamic militants
- No. of participants: 4 personnel

The Cinema Rex fire (Persian: آتش‌سوزی سینما رکس آبادان, lit. 'Rex Abadan cinema fire') occurred on 19 August 1978 when the Cinema Rex in Abadan, Iran, was set ablaze, killing between 377 and 470 people. The event started when four individuals, who were militants motivated by Islamic extremism, doused the building with airplane fuel before setting it alight. The attack was responsible in part for triggering the Iranian Revolution of 1979, which saw the overthrow of the ruling dynasty under the Iranian monarch and a related outbreak of mass violence.

The governing dynasty initially blamed "Islamic Marxists" for the fire and later reported that Islamic militants started the fire, while anti-Pahlavi protesters falsely blamed SAVAK, the Iranian secret police, for setting the fire. Even though Islamic extremists were responsible for the attack, the Islamic opposition benefited greatly from the disaster in terms of propaganda because of the general atmosphere of mistrust and wrath. Many Iranians accepted the disinformation, which fueled growing anti-Shah fervor.

According to Roy Mottahedeh, an American historian who authored The Mantle of the Prophet, "thousands of Iranians who had felt neutral and had until now thought that the struggle was only between the shah and supporters of religiously conservative mullahs felt that the government might put their own lives on the block to save itself. Suddenly, for hundreds of thousands, the movement was their own business."

== Fire ==
On 19th August 1978 at the Cinema Rex in Abadan, Iran, hundreds of people were watching The Deer (Gavaznha) when, at 20:21, four men identified as Hossein Takbalizadeh, Faraj Bazrkar, Fallah Mohammadi, and Yadollah Mohammadpur barred the doors of the cinema and doused it with petrol from a can. The fire started outside three entrance doors to the main hall after Takbalizadeh allegedly dropped a match into the petrol. The attackers then fled. Around 100 people escaped uninjured via the roof, and a further 223 suffered nonfatal injuries; the remainder, at least 377, died in the fire.

The fire was followed within hours by a firebombing in Shiraz. A theater in Mashhad had been burned down, killing three people, two days prior.

== Death toll ==
The actual number of dead is contested. Some of the numbers cited by sources include 377, 410, 422, 430, and 470.

== Perpetrators ==
The event was a key trigger leading up to the 1979 Iranian Revolution. Initially, the revolutionaries falsely alleged that SAVAK intelligence agents were in pursuit of individuals who ran into the theatre and used it as an opportunity to hide in a large crowd. Later, the fugitives (or the SAVAK agents chasing them) locked the cinema doors. Unable to escape from the building, hundreds of people inside the cinema died in the conflagration.

Under the Islamic regime, the Iranian newspaper Sobhe Emruz blamed radical Islamists in an editorial [what date?] addressing Kayhan newspaper run by Hossein Shariatmadari (Shariatmadari has been described as being "a close confidant of Iran's supreme leader" Ali Khamenei, and as having "links" to Iran's intelligence services). Sobhe Emruz wrote, "Don't make us disclose who were really behind the Cinema Rex fire," causing the newspaper to be shut down shortly afterward.

According to the historian Abbas Amanat: "From what is known, the Rex Cinema's exit doors were intentionally locked. Widespread rumors at the time held SAVAK and the pro-government agents provocateurs responsible. Yet the arson was consistent with Islamic activists' setting ablaze cinemas and other venues of supposed Western decadence for more than a decade. As was witnessed in many instances of arson that destroyed cinemas, first in Qom and later in other cities, the Rex Cinema incident displayed the perpetrators' utter lack of moral scruples, as became evident in the course of their trial a few months later. The Islamic opposition, however, stood to reap major propaganda advantages from the tragedy in the prevailing environment of suspicion and anger."

According to the historian Firoozeh Kashani-Sabet: "Though subsequent scholarship has pointed the finger at supporters of the revolution for the arson, the Islamic Republic disregards these findings and holds the shah's secret police, SAVAK, responsible for the crime."

According to the military historian Spencer C. Tucker: "In Abadan, four Islamic militants bar the door of the Cinema Rex movie theater and then set the building on fire, killing 422 people inside. Khomeini blames the shah and SAVAK, and many Iranians believe the lie. Tens of thousands march in the streets chanting Burn the shah! Soon hundreds of thousands of Iranians are taking part in renewed demonstrations."

According to the sociologist Farhad Khosrokhavar: "The burning of the Cinema Rex in Abadan on August 19, 1978, where around 400 people were killed, was perpetrated by the Shah's Savak secret service, according to street protesters. This contributed to the revolutionary ardor of Islamic militants and society at large against the besieged regime of the Shah. Later findings confirmed that the fire was ignited by Islamist militants on the side of the pro-Khomeyni revolutionaries and not the Shah's regime. But the result was detrimental to the Pahlavi regime and favorable to the Islamic revolution."

According to the historian Abbas Milani: "More than four hundred innocent spectators burned to death. The government was slow to respond. Its attempt to lay the blame on the opposition fell on deaf ears. Although in retrospect the dastardly act has all the hallmarks of Islamic terrorism, and although in future years evidence emerged showing the culpability of the clergy, the people at the time blamed the government."

According to the historian Michael Axworthy: "Government and opposition both accused each other, but events, trials and investigations in later years indicate that a radical Islamic group with connections to ulema figures was responsible."

As the event occurred during the revolutionary period, it was quite difficult to identify the perpetrators, making ill-conceived accusations rather prevalent. Many elements of the revolutionary bloc blamed Mohammad Reza Shah, the now deposed monarch of Iran, and SAVAK, the country's domestic security and intelligence service. Although sufficient evidence was never brought forth to facilitate such claims, the labeling would have far-reaching implications for the subsequent direction of the revolutionary movement. The circumstances under which the fire was set did not aid the Shah's pleas of innocence. The location of the incident, an impoverished district of Abadan, and its timing did not coincide with preceding patterns of protest, which raised the level of suspicion. It was also believed that the Shah targeted Cinema Rex to kill political dissidents who had gathered to watch the anti-government film playing there.

While initial rumors blamed Shah and SAVAK for the fire, after the revolution, more evidence suggested the four-person arson team was indirectly in touch with Shia clerics. The order came from them. Ayatollah Nouri Hamedani is reported by Mohammad Nourizad to be one of the faces behind the arson. When asked why Ayatollah Nouri Hamedani was quoted that the silence of Khouzestan province people was the motive behind Cinema Rex fire. They wanted the employees of National Iranian Oil Company to join the strikes against Mohammad Reza Shah. The government, however, remained silent and did not pursue it further. There were discussions that people would not believe the truth if they were informed by SAVAK. There was also a belief that the government at the time remained silent because they were still hopeful to rebuild good relations with the clerics.

== Threat of cinema to Shia extremists ==
Islamists were against cinema in general, especially the rise of sex scenes in movies was a concern to them. Other cinemas were targeted by them too. In an interview with Kayhan, Ayatollah Lahouti said Qom Cinema was bombed by the order of Ahmad Khomeini. Setting cinemas on fire was a common issue since 1969, while no mosque or sacred place was set on fire at the same time. Farajollah Salahshoor, a religious Iranian filmmaker, said: "We knew well that cinema was a channel for western culture entry, I have burned cinemas like others before the revolution. Unfortunately, after the revolution, museums were built for those cinemas and cinema is supported."

In an interview with Hossein Dehbashi, Mohsen Safaei Farahani claimed that the person responsible for the fire "..became a member of Parliament after Islamic Revolution". Alireza Nourizadeh, a journalist meeting with Intelligence minister at the time, quoted the intelligence minister: "Our information shows burning Cinema Rex order came from Najaf." (Najaf was a main center of Shia Islam). Nourizadeh mentioned the name that Mr. Aameri Tehrani said was "... Mr. Kiavash who later became a Member of Parliament. Mr. Kiavash was in touch with the main suspect, Hossein Takbalizadeh, and also in touch with Najaf clerics."

According to Middle East expert Daniel L. Byman, "The movies were an affront to God, encouraging vice and Western-style decadence. So in August 1978, four Shiite revolutionaries locked the doors of the Cinema Rex in the Iranian city of Abadan and set the theater on fire."

== Investigation and trial ==
Iraj Mesdaghi wrote that at the beginning of Islamic Republic formation, Mousavi Tabrizi was carefully selected as the judge for the Cinema Rex case. His father-in-law Ayatollah Nouri Hamedani is reported to be one of the faces behind the Cinema Rex fire. The case was hardly moving forward at first. Later, due to pressures by public and the families of victims the court started on August 23, 1980. Reluctant to accept the Islamist roles, it ended up as a theatrical trial. After several resignations from district attorneys and officials, Tabrizi played both the role of district attorney as well as judge.

According to the Washington-based group Human Rights & Democracy for Iran, the families of the victims led the charge for further investigation of the case, even resorting to a long sit-in protest from April to August 1980. The new Iranian government arrested Captain Monir Taheri, who was accused by the Revolutionary Tribunal of Rudsar of having received guerrilla training in the United States. Taheri's defense maintained that he had never visited Abadan and that he was in Ahvaz at the time of the blaze. The tribunal found Taheri guilty and executed him shortly thereafter on 23 February 1979.

Lasting from 25 August to 4 September 1980, the Revolutionary Tribunal oversaw 17 court sessions that involved the trial of 26 individuals, including the only survivor of the four-man arson team, Hossein Takbalizadeh, who stated in his defense that he was an unemployed drug addict. After much deliberation, Takbalizadeh and five others were put to death in public.

== In popular culture ==
The Cinema Rex fire is depicted in the graphic novel Persepolis by Marjane Satrapi. She states that the public attributes the fire to the Shah. In The Lion Women of Tehran by Marjan Kamali, Abdol is killed in the fire while visiting his cousin.

== See also ==
- Assassination and terrorism in Iran
- Background and causes of the Iranian Revolution

== Bibliography ==
- "IRAN: After the Abadan Fire, the mullahs and the modernists collide". Time. Vol. 112, no. 10. 4 September 1978. ISSN 0040-781X.
- "Shah's Inferno – Abadan". Resistance, No. 2. Berkeley, CA: Iranian Students Association in the U.S. (ISAUS). December 1978. OCLC 62767227.
- Mottahedeh, Roy P. - The Mantle of the Prophet: Religion and Politics in Iran, Oxford, Oneworld, 2000.
- Byman, Daniel L. (6 May 2007). "The Rise of Low-Tech Terrorism: Never heard of the Cinema Rex fire in Abadan in 1978? It's the second-deadliest terrorist attack in modern history". The Washington Post. pp. B03. ISSN 2641-9599. Archived from the original on 20 August 2007.
