= 2005 Ahvaz unrest =

Civil unrest between Iranian Arabs and government in 2005

- Part of Arab separatism in Khuzestan
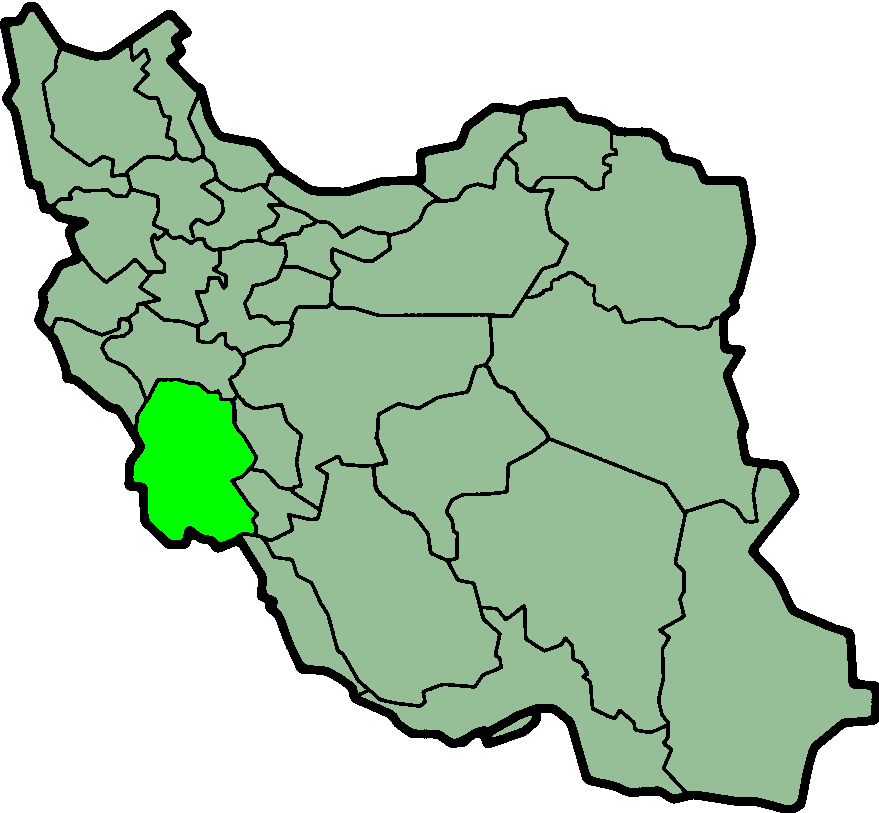
- Iranian Khuzestan province
- Date: 15–18 April 2005
- Methods: Demonstrations, riots
- Result: Unrest quelled

Parties
Iranian Arabs	Iranian Government

Lead figures
No centralized leadership	Ali Khamenei; Supreme Leader of Iran Mohammad Khatami; President of Iran

Casualties
- Death: 1–20 (Iranian sources); 15–50 (external sources)
- Injuries: dozens
- Arrested: hundreds arrested

2005 Ahvaz unrest or 15 April Ahvaz Protests were violent riots, initiated by Iranian Arabs in the city of Ahvaz in the southwestern Iranian province of Khuzestan. The unrest erupted on 15 April 2005, and lasted for 4 days. Initially, the Iranian Interior Ministry stated that only one person had been killed, however an official at a hospital in Ahvaz said that there were between 15 and 20 mortal casualties. Government officials blamed the unrest on Britain, whose troops were based just across the border in southern Iraq. Following the unrest, several bombings were carried out in Ahvaz, killing 28 people. In 2006, Iran executed five Arab separatists, convicted of carrying out the bombings in 2005.

== Background ==
The Arabs of Iran are concentrated in the province of Khuzestan and number between half a million and 2 million. These Arabs are descendants of Shi'ite Arab tribes gradually migrating to Iran since the 16th century. Most Iranian Arabs are Shi'a, but a small minority of Sunni Muslim Arabs live along the Persian Gulf coastline. In Khuzestan, Arabs are the dominant ethnic group in Shadegan, Hoveyzeh and Susangerd, a majority in Mahshahr and Khorramshahr, a minority in Abadan, and together with Persians, Arabs are one of the two main ethnic groups in Ahvaz.

The Constitution of Iran guarantees freedom of cultural expression and linguistic diversity. Khūzestān Province has radio and television stations in Arabic. School education is in Persian, the official language, but use of Arabic is allowed under the Constitution of the Islamic Republic. Article 15 of the Constitution states:

The Official Language and script of Iran, the lingua franca of its people, is Persian. Official documents, correspondence, and texts, as well as textbooks, must be in this language and script. However, the use of regional and tribal languages in the press and mass media, as well as for teaching of their literature in schools, is allowed in addition to Persian

However, some human rights groups have accused the Iranian government of discrimination and other human rights violations against Iranian Arabs and of violating the constitutional guarantees of equality. Amnesty International says:

Despite the Arab population remaining largely loyal to Iran during the Iran-Iraq war in the 1980s, the central government in Tehran has continued to view Arab Iranians with suspicion. Iranian Arabs claim this has led to discriminatory policies and unequal access to resources aimed at social development.

According to the US Department of State:

In general the government (i.e. of Iran) did not discriminate on the basis of race, disability, language, or social status; however, it discriminated on the basis of religion, sex, and ethnicity. The poorest areas of the country are those inhabited by ethnic minorities, such as the Baluchis in Sistan va Baluchestan Province and by Arabs in the southwest. Much of the damage suffered by Khuzestan Province during the eight-year war with Iraq has not been repaired; consequently, the quality of life of the largely Arab local population was degraded. Kurds, Azeris, and Ahvazi Arabs were not allowed to study their languages.

According to Article 16 of the Constitution of the Islamic Republic of Iran, Arabic is taught in all classes of secondary school and in all areas of study including universities.

== Causes ==
A forged letter attributed to Mohammad-Ali Abtahi, an adviser to Iran's Reformist President Mohammad Khatami, began circulating in the blogosphere, and was widely circulated by hand and subsequently cited in a report by al-Jazeera network. The fake letter proposed measures to reduce the proportion of Arabs in Khuzestan. The letter inspired crowds of young Arab rioters to attack government buildings and institutions in Ahvaz city. Some Iran experts and analysts at the time speculated that the move was part of a plan by the conservative establishment to discredit the reformist camp among Arabs in the run-up to the 2005 presidential poll.

== Casualties ==
The Iranian Interior Ministry stated that only one person had been killed, while an official at a hospital in Ahvaz said that between 15 and 20 mortal casualties. Another government official said clashes with security services resulted in 3 or 4 deaths.

A spokesman for the Ahvaz Arab People Democratic Popular Front, Abu Shaker al-Ahwazi, mentioned the names of 20 people who he said had been killed in the clashes. He said that "dozens of people had been wounded and 300 others had been arrested." Amnesty International has cited "unconfirmed reports" that 29 people were killed. Human Rights Watch (HRW) reported at least 50 deaths.

News reports and accounts have put the number of fatal casualties at between 5 and 20.

== Aftermath ==
The Iranian government officials blamed the Khuzestan unrest on UK, which hosts the headquarters of the Iranian Arab militant group "Al-Ahwaz Arab Peoples Democratic Popular Front". The government also temporarily banned broadcasts by the Arabic-language satellite-television station Al-Jazeera, accusing it of fanning the unrest. Ali Yunesi, the intelligence minister at the time, said those arrested in Khuzestan were mainly "young, innocent people" who had been provoked by "real criminals". Defense Minister at the time – Ali Shamkhani, who is an ethnic Arab, was dispatched by the Reformist Government of Khatami, to the Ahvaz area to look into the reasons behind the unrest. He met with local leaders, and he stressed that ethnic Arabs are an integral part of the country but acknowledged that Khuzestan Province suffers from "underdevelopment".

Following the riots, in June 2005 four bombings by Arab separatist militants in Ahvaz and two others in Tehran killed 10 people and injured at least 90. Two other bombings in Ahvaz, one in October 2005 and another in January 2005, killed 12 people. In 2006, Iran executed five Arab separatists convicted of carrying out the bombings in 2005. According to an April 2006 report by the Amnesty International, on 4 November 2005, during a Muslim feast celebrating the end of Ramadan, several hundred Iranian Arab demonstrators marched towards the centre of Ahvaz city, and were met by the security forces, who reportedly fired tear gas grenades into the crowd causing two youths to fall into the Karoun River and drown, apparently under the effects of the tear gas which caused temporary paralysis. Amnesty International has also stated that there were further clashes in Khuzestan between Iranian Arabs and the security forces on 11 and 12 January 2006, during the Muslim Feast of Sacrifice, which reportedly resulted in 3 deaths and 40 injured persons. The demonstrators were reportedly demanding "an end to Arab persecution, poverty and unemployment, and the release of political prisoners detained since April 2005".

On 15 April 2011, there was a protest by the Sunni Arab minority in Ahvaz, to mark the sixth anniversary of the 2005 events. In a letter, written to the UN high commissioner for human rights, Iran's Nobel Peace Prize laureate Shirin Ebadi stated that "more than 12 people were killed, around 20 injured and tens of protesters have been arrested."

== See also ==
- List of modern conflicts in the Middle East
- Politics of Khuzestan Province
