= Middle Eastern crisis (2023–present) =

Period of escalations in the Middle East

- Part of the Arab–Israeli conflict and the Iran–Israel conflicts
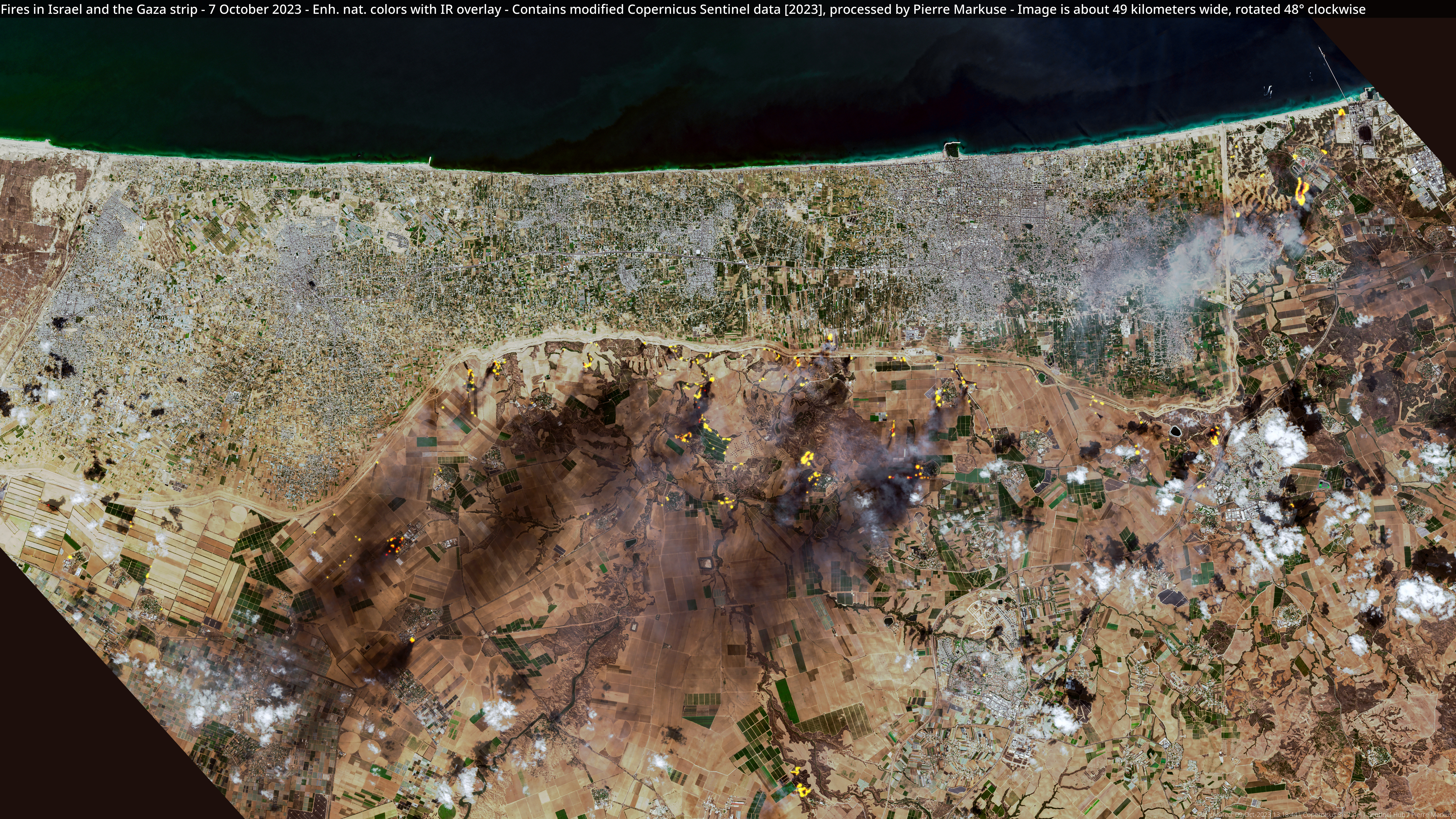
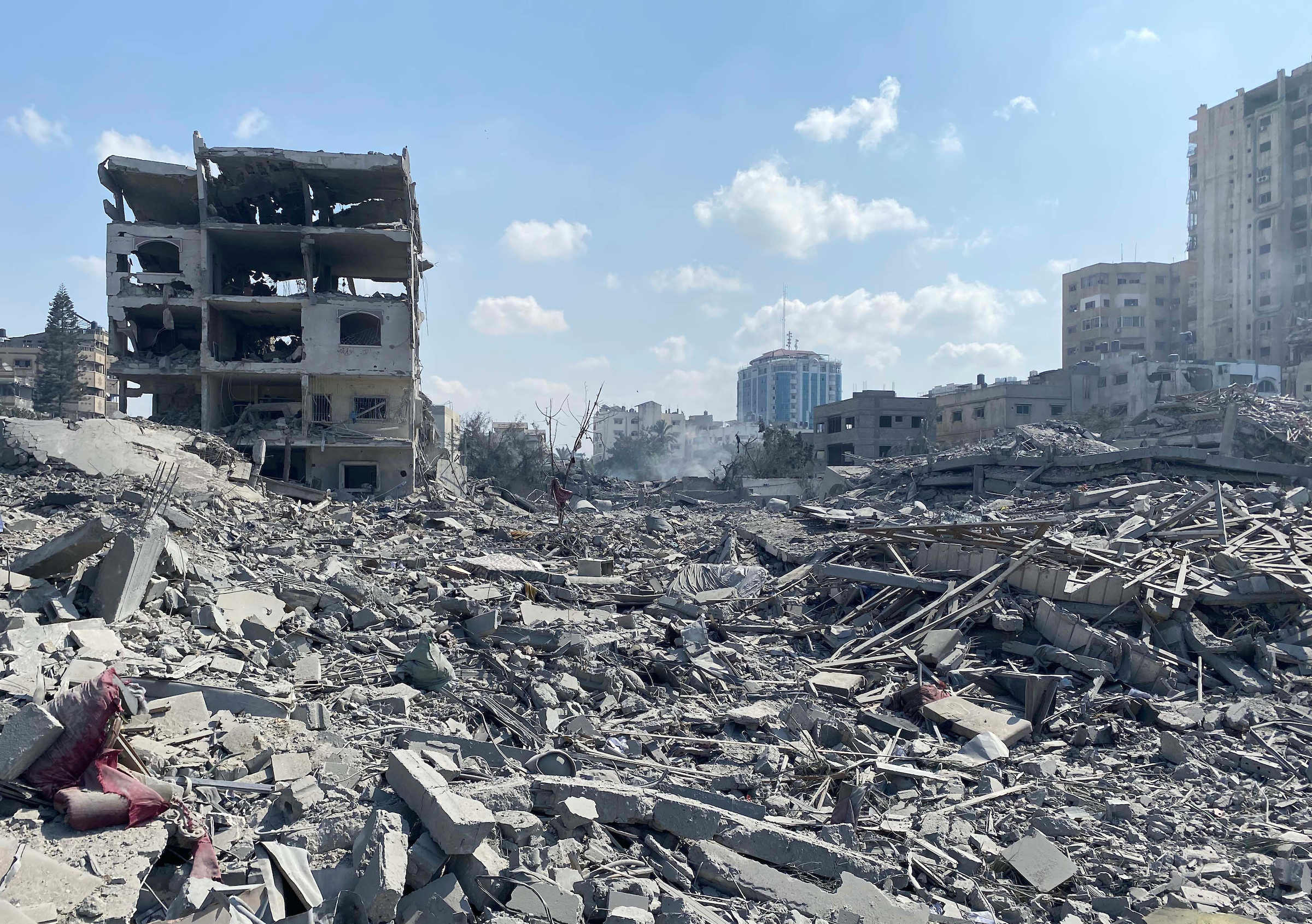
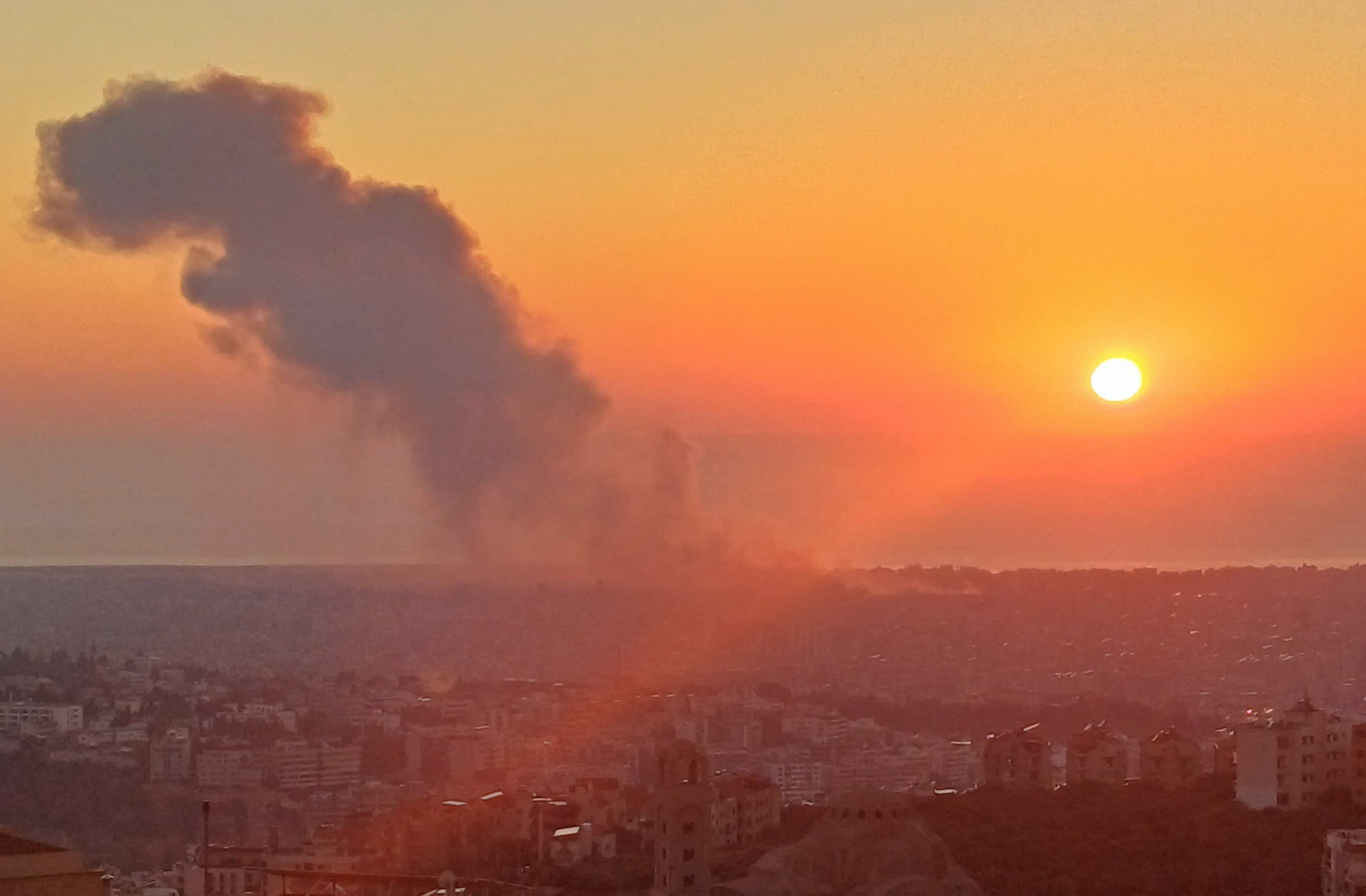
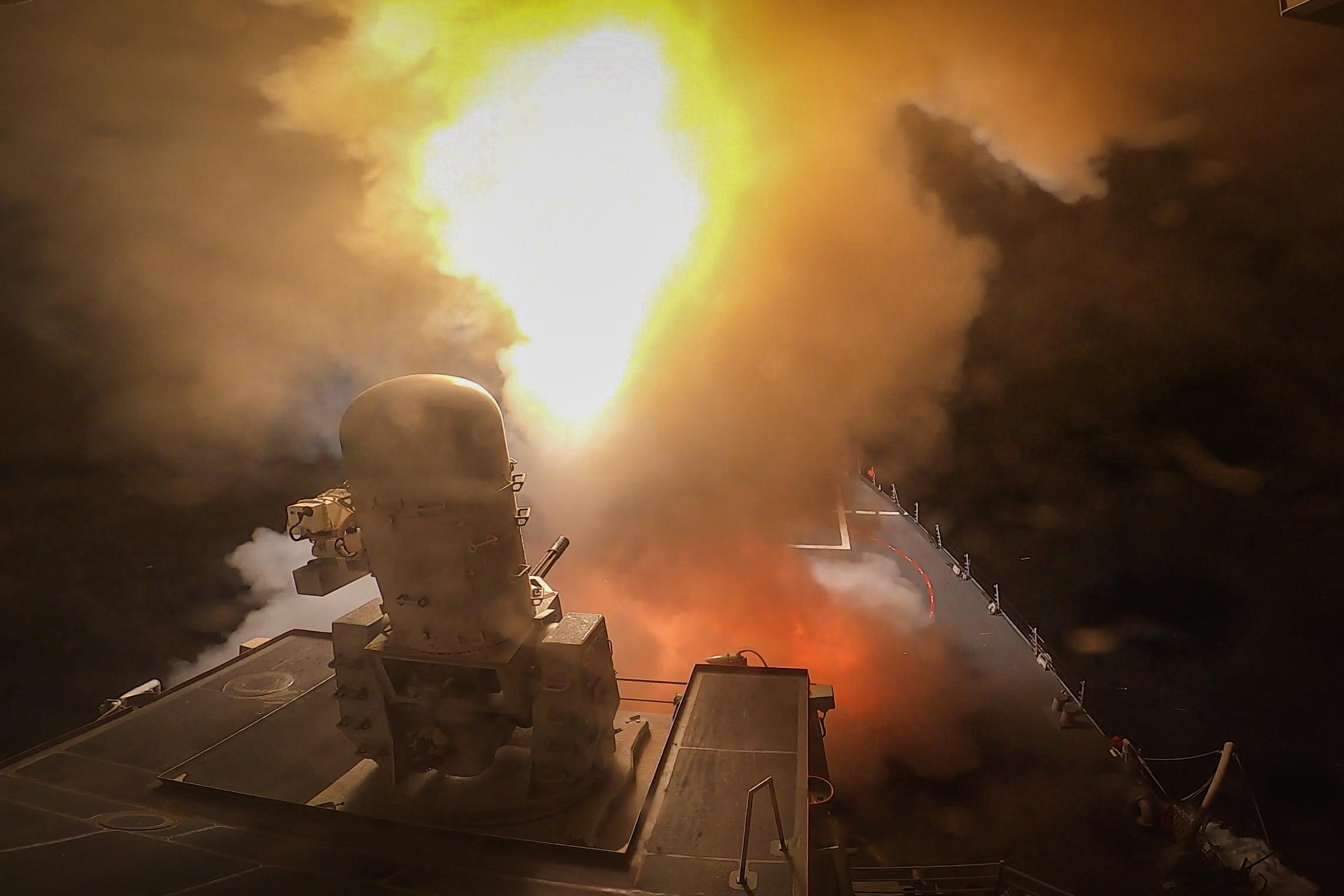
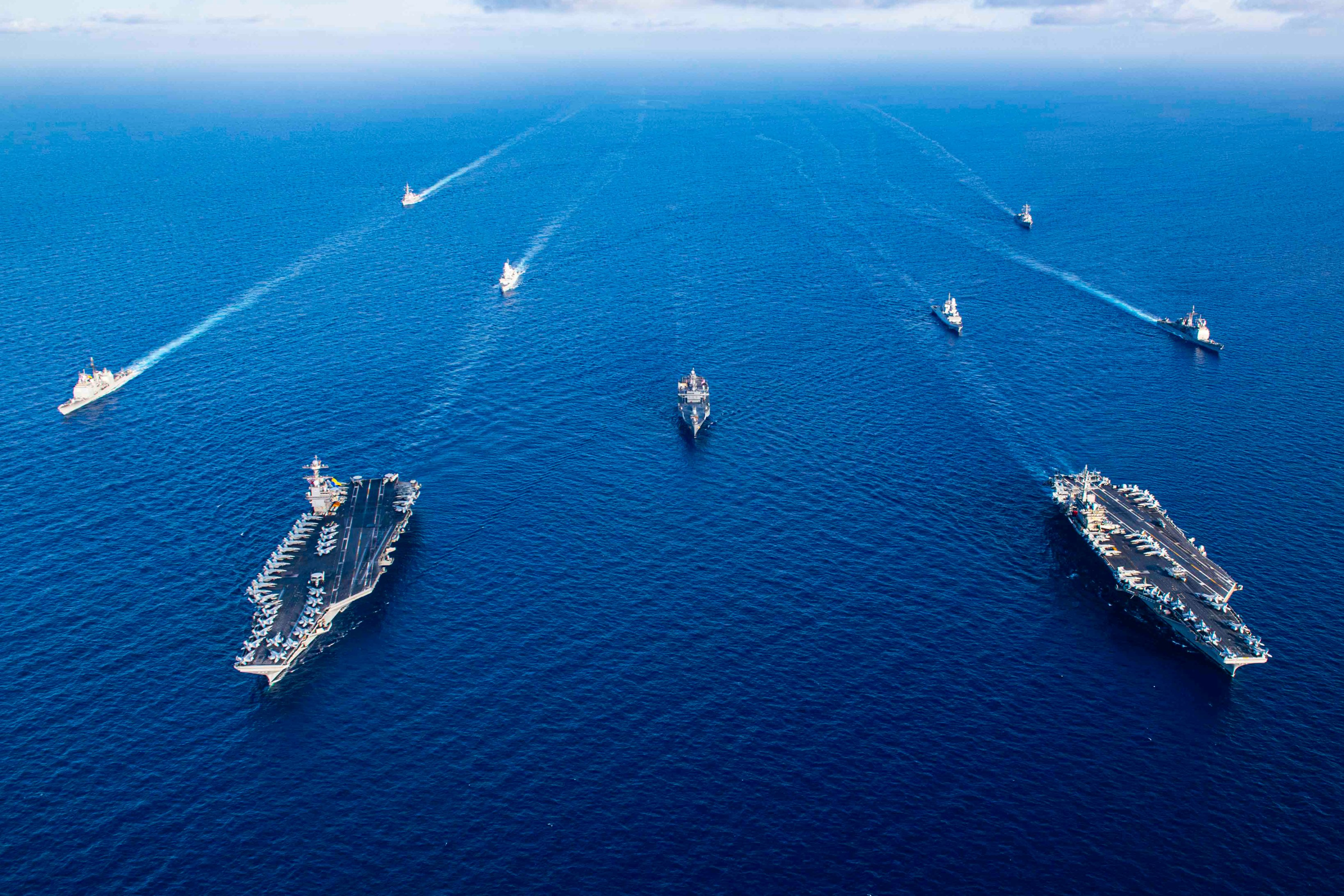
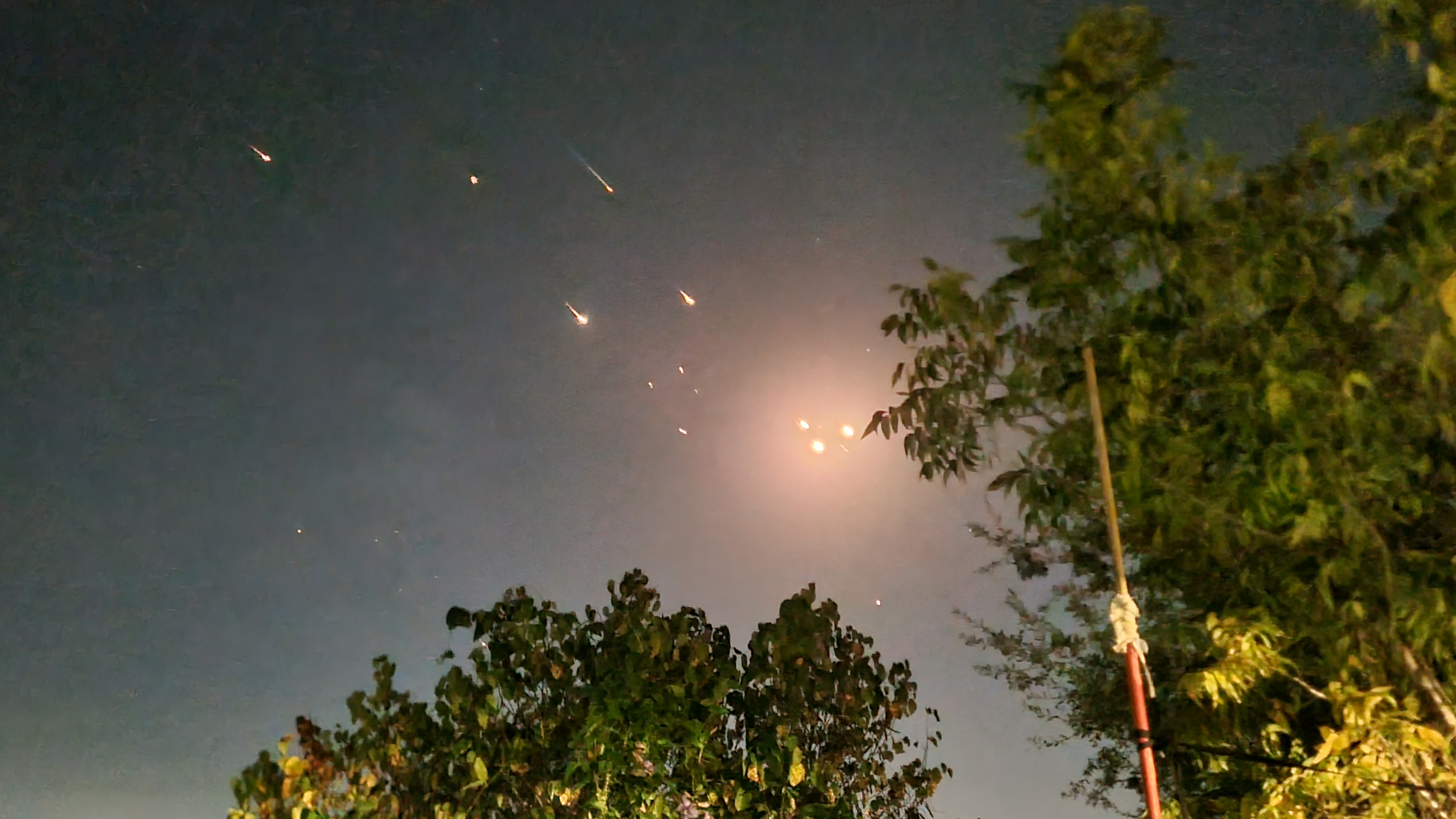
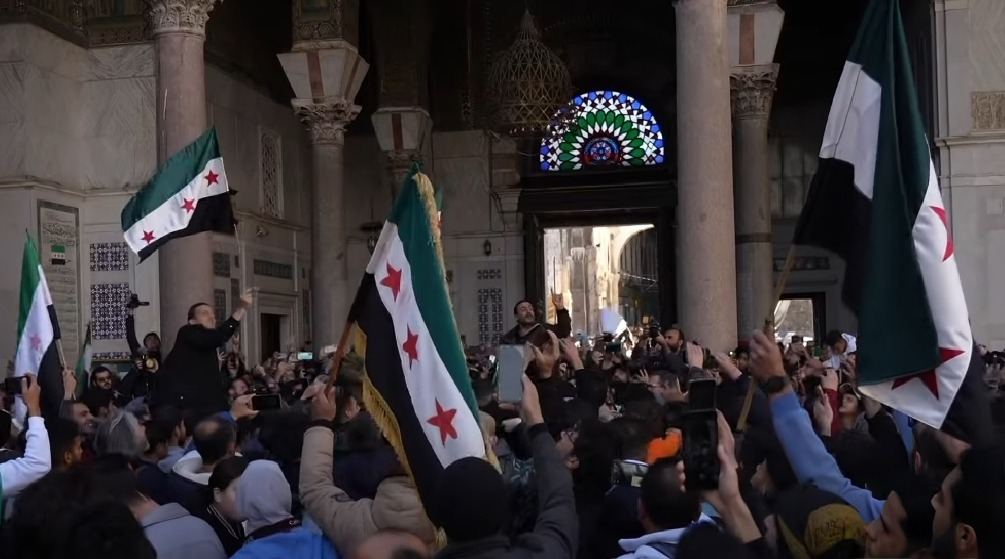
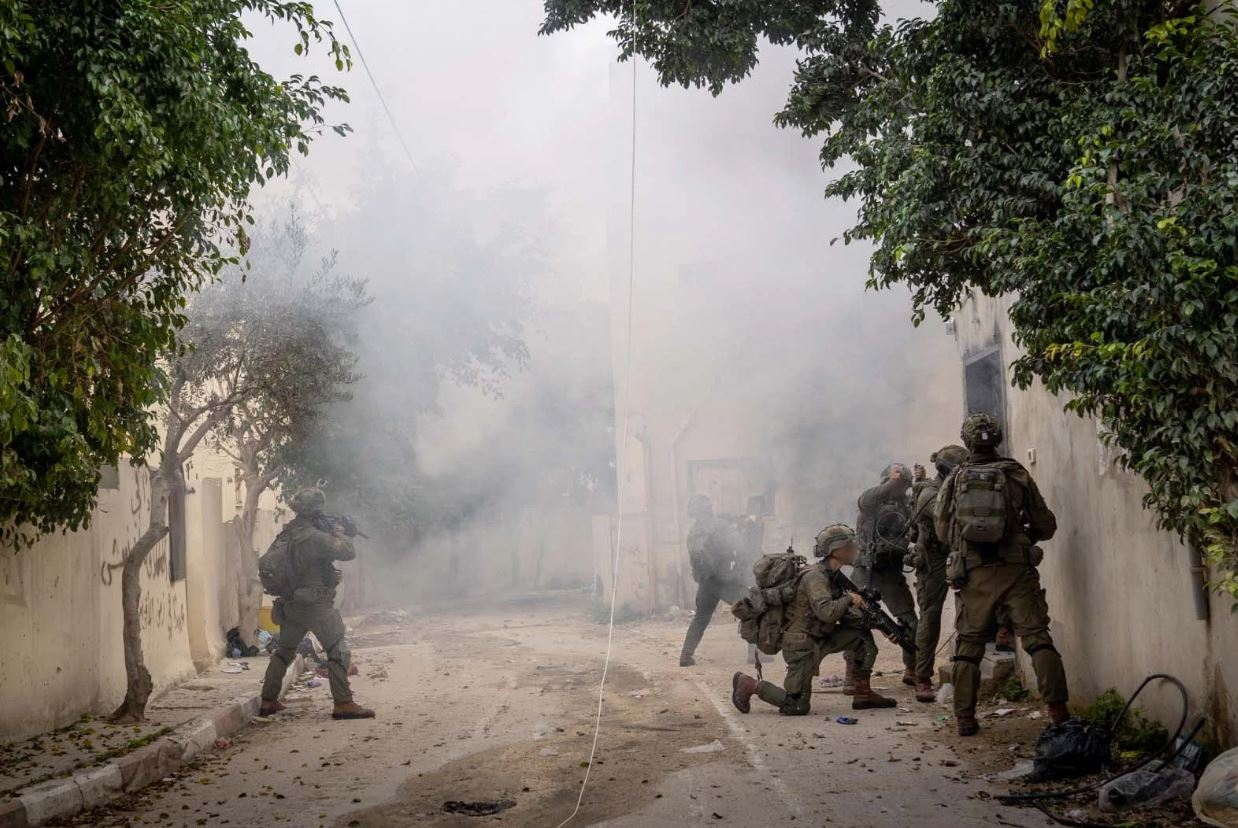
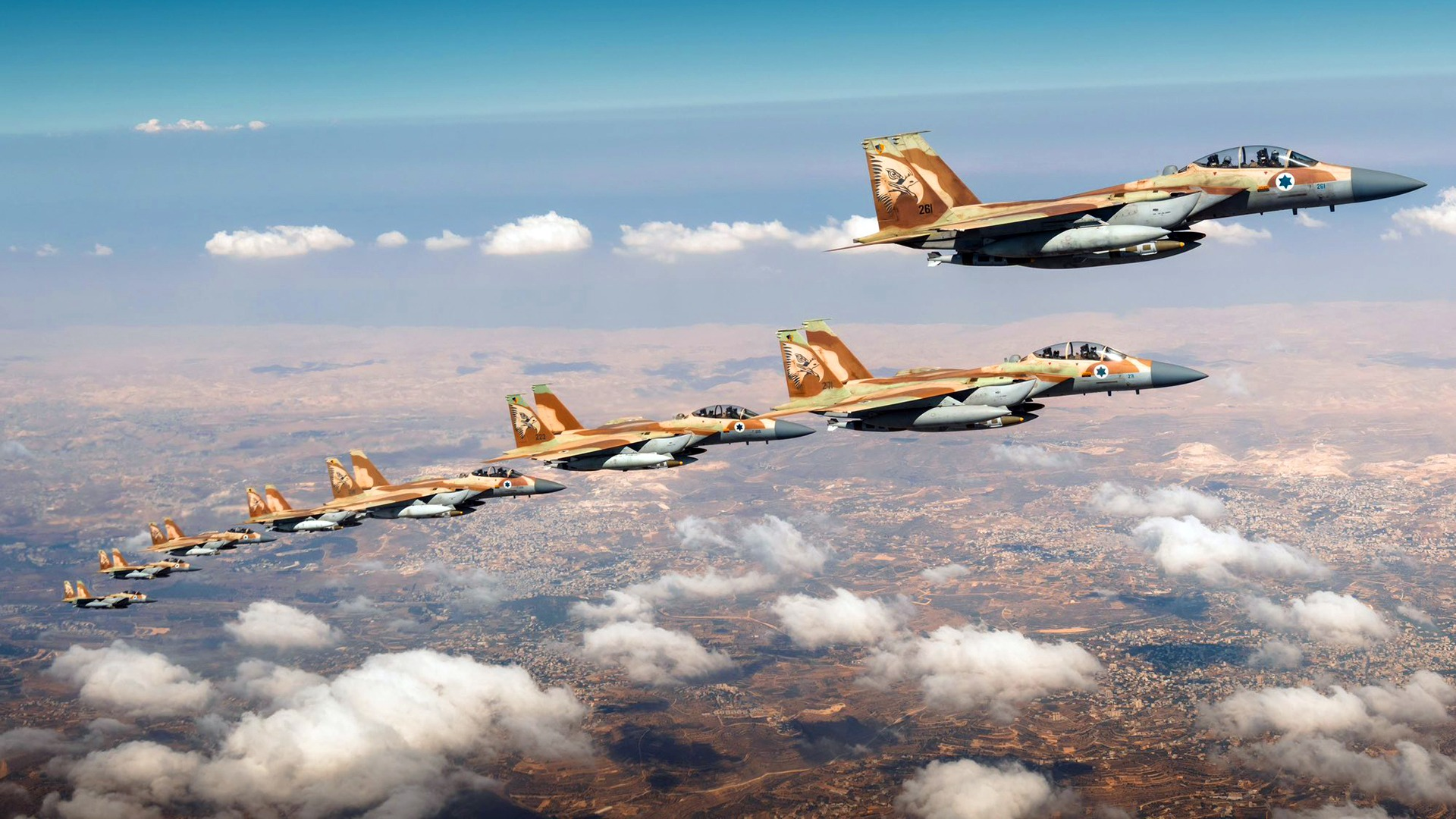
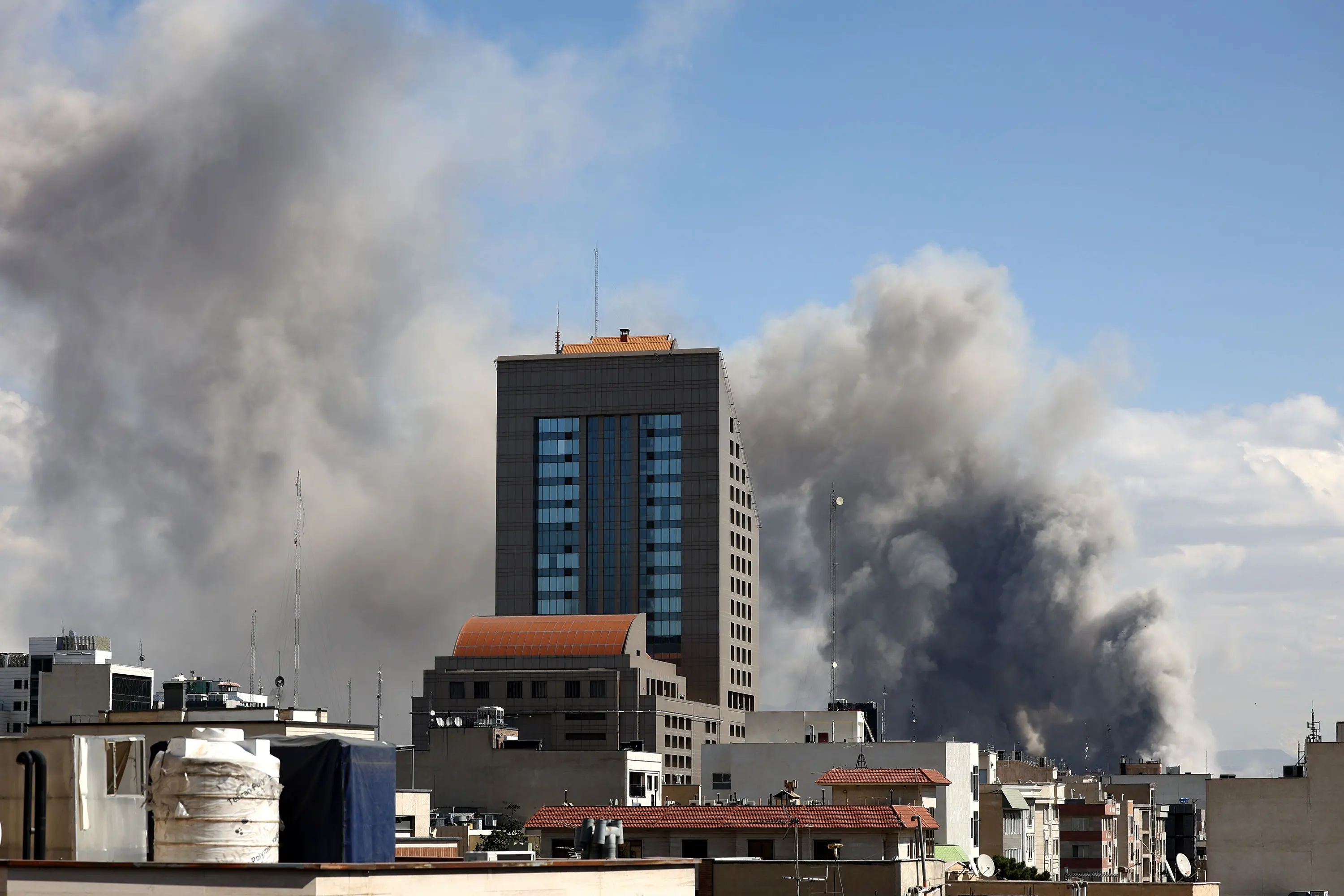
- October 7 attacks Gaza war Israel–Hezbollah conflict Red Sea crisis Attacks on US bases 2024 Iran–Israel conflict Fall of the Assad regime West Bank incursions Twelve-Day War 2026 Iran war Strait of Hormuz crisis 2026 Yemen offensives
Date	7 October 2023 – present (3 years, 1 month, 1 week and 2 days)
Location	Middle East
Status	Ongoing: Pause in Arab–Israeli normalization; Escalation of the Iran–Israel proxy conflict into direct conflict; Israeli invasions of Gaza, Lebanon, and Syria; Attacks on US bases by Iranian backed militias; Fall of the Assad regime in Syria; US–Houthi ceasefire after US strikes; De jure ceasefire in Gaza; Outbreak of the 2026 Iran war; Red Sea crisis, Strait of Hormuz crisis, and Bab al-Mandab crisis; Escalation of the Yemeni civil war; Fall of the Southern Transitional Council in Yemen; Escalation of the Iran–Kurdish separatist and Iran–People's Fighters Front conflicts; Withdrawal of United States troops from Iraq in 2026

Belligerents
Iran; Syria (until 2024); Hamas; Hezbollah; Houthis; Popular Mobilization Forces; Islamic Resistance in Iraq; Palestinian Islamic Jihad...other allies (Note: The Axis of Resistance is an informal coalition of Middle Eastern militias aligned with Iran. Alongside Hamas, Hezbollah, the Houthis, and Ba'athist Syria, major participants in the conflict include Palestinian Islamic Jihad and the Islamic Resistance in Iraq, as well as smaller Palestinian militant groups in the Joint Operations Room and several Lebanese militias. The Bahrain-based al-Ashtar Brigades and the Muslim Brotherhood have also engaged in conflict with Israel during the crisis. Russia has provided military assistance to the Houthis and conducted several airstrikes on the side of Ba'athist Syria during the 2024 Syrian opposition offensives.)	Israel; United States; Saudi Arabia; United Arab Emirates; United Kingdom (Note: Operation Poseidon Archer, Operation Iron Shield, Operation Rough Rider, and 2026 Iranian strikes on Cyprus); Jordan (Note: Jordan shot down Iranian missiles that entered its airspace during attacks on Israel in April 2024, October 2024, and June 2025.); Kuwait; Bahrain; France; Yemen (PLC); CPFIK; People's Fighters Front...other support (Note: Over the course of the conflict, Israel has received weaponry from various foreign governments. Two multinational coalitions have responded to Houthi attacks in the Red Sea crisis – the United States–led Operation Prosperity Guardian and the European Union–led Operation Aspides. The Israeli-backed Palestinian Popular Forces have fought in Gaza since May 2024. An Iranian-Kurdish separatist group called the Sun of Hope was formed in 2026 and claimed responsibility for attacks against Iranian armed force members.)	Palestinian Authority (Note: The Palestinian Authority has been in conflict with Iran-allied groups opposed to both it and Israel. While it is not an ally of Israel, it cooperates with the Israeli military in Palestinian-controlled areas of the West Bank.) Pakistan (Note: In January 2024, Pakistan launched retaliatory strikes against Iran for airstrikes against Balochi separatists on Pakistani territory, claiming strikes against other Balochi militants in Iran.) Self-defense only: Lebanon (Note: The Lebanese government said it would stay out of the 2024 Israeli invasion of Lebanon, but responded militarily to Israeli attacks on its positions.); Qatar (Note: Qatar shot down Iranian missiles that entered its airspace on 23 June 2025, when Iran targeted US forces at Al Udeid Air Base in Qatar, as retaliation for the United States strikes on Iranian nuclear sites. On 9 September 2025, Israel struck the Hamas headquarters in Qatar, reportedly targeting several Hamas officials.); Egypt; Oman; Iraq; Syria (from 2024) (Note: Syria is currently governed by a transitional government that was formed by rebels and opposition groups who overthrew the Iran-allied Assad regime in 2024. Israel invaded part of Syria after Assad's fall and has conducted airstrikes against Syrian bases; while Syrian transitional leaders have condemned Israel's invasion, they have not engaged in direct conflict with Israel and have instead pushed for cordial relations with the country.); Azerbaijan; Turkey

Commanders and leaders
(Iran) Ali Khamenei X (Iran) Mojtaba Khamenei (WIA) (Ba'athist Syria) Bashar al-Assad (surrendered) (Hamas) Ismail Haniyeh X (Hamas) Yahya Sinwar † (Hamas) Mohammed Sinwar X (Hamas) Khalil al-Hayya (Hezbollah) Hassan Nasrallah X (Hezbollah) Naim Qassem; Abdul-Malik al-Houthi (Popular Mobilization Forces) Falih Al-Fayyadh	(Israel) Benjamin Netanyahu (United States) Donald Trump (United States) Joe Biden (Saudi Arabia) Mohammed bin Salman (United Arab Emirates) Mohammed bin Zayed (United Kingdom) Andy Burnham (United Kingdom) Keir Starmer (United Kingdom) Rishi Sunak (Jordan) Abdullah II (Kuwait) Mishal Al-Ahmed (Bahrain) Hamad bin Isa Al Khalifa (France) Emmanuel Macron (Yemen) Rashad al-Alimi	(Lebanon) Joseph Aoun (Lebanon) Najib Mikati (Qatar) Tamim bin Hamad Al Thani (Egypt) Abdel Fattah el-Sisi (Oman) Haitham bin Tariq (Iraq) Ali al-Zaidi (Iraq) Mohammed Shia' al-Sudani (Syria) Ahmed al-Sharaa (Turkey) Recep Tayyip Erdoğan (Azerbaijan) Ilham Aliyev (Palestine) Mahmoud Abbas (Pakistan) Anwaar ul Haq Kakar

Units involved
- See order of battle

Casualties and losses
- See casualties

The Middle East is currently experiencing an ongoing series of interrelated wars, conflicts, and heightened instability, triggered by the ongoing Gaza war and the genocide in Gaza. (Note: While this crisis is widely regarded as having begun with Hamas' attack on Israel on 7 October 2023, scholars and humanitarian organizations emphasize that the broader Israeli–Palestinian conflict stems from decades of structural displacement, a multi-decade land and sea blockade of the Gaza Strip, and recurring wars.) (Note: While critics attribute the crisis to expansionist or Greater Israel objectives, Israel maintains that its military actions and territorial operations are a necessary response for national defense under its post–October 7 security doctrine.) These have primarily consisted of conflicts between Israel and the United States on one side, and Iran and militias that form the "Axis of Resistance", which includes such groups as Hamas, (Note: Sometimes included in the "Axis of Resistance".) Hezbollah, and the Houthis, on the other. (Note: International observers, human rights organizations, and legal scholars have raised concerns regarding the scale of Israel's military campaign. Critics point to significant power asymmetries, widespread destruction of civilian infrastructure, and heavy bombardment as evidence that operations may exceed conventional parameters of proportionality and self-defense. The Israeli narrative frames the military campaign as a legitimate and necessary act of self-defense against Iran and its non-state allies following the October 7 attacks, asserting adherence to international law while blaming adversaries for using civilians as human shields.) Allies of Israel, including the United Kingdom and France, have also intervened militarily in various theaters. The crisis has involved all Middle Eastern countries, significantly affecting the region as a whole.

Hamas led an attack against Israel on 7 October 2023, to which Israel responded with a bombardment and ground invasion of Gaza. Shortly afterwards, other militias in the Axis of Resistance joined the conflict on the side of Gaza. Hezbollah launched rockets into Israel, beginning a series of clashes. The Houthis began attacking shipping vessels in the Red Sea, drawing international rebuke, including a series of American and British airstrikes on the Houthis starting in January 2024. Several militias led by the Islamic Resistance in Iraq also attacked US military bases in Iraq, Syria, and Jordan.

In 2024, Israel continued its invasion of Gaza, including the Rafah offensive and killings of Hamas leaders. It escalated its conflict with Hezbollah in September with electronic device attacks and the assassination of the group's top figures, then invaded southern Lebanon before reaching a ceasefire in November. Iran and Israel exchanged direct attacks on each other's territory twice, in April and October. Syrian opposition groups began an offensive that reignited the Syrian civil war in late November and culminated with the overthrow of the Iran-backed Assad regime on 8 December.

After the Assad regime fell, Israel invaded the area around its border with Syria and carried out strikes across the country. The US began renewed attacks on Yemen in March 2025, until a US–Houthi ceasefire in May, after which Israel and the Houthis continued attacks on each other. In June 2025, Israel launched a surprise attack on Iran that began the Twelve-Day War between them. During the war, the US conducted strikes on Iranian nuclear facilities, and Iran retaliated by attacking a US base in Qatar. Israel launched an offensive into Gaza City after a ceasefire with Iran, targeting Hamas officials in Qatar during US diplomatic talks aimed at reaching an agreement. The Gaza peace plan was introduced by the US a month later, in October.

In 2026, the US began a rapid military buildup in the region, which culminated in a joint American–Israeli war on Iran and its non-state regional allies starting on 28 February, including the assassination of Iranian supreme leader Ali Khamenei. In response, Iran attacked Israel, US bases, and several Arab countries, and closed the Strait of Hormuz. In Lebanon, the Hezbollah–Israel conflict escalated to another war, while Iran-backed militias in Iraq engaged in conflict with the US and Israel, and the Houthis launched attacks on Israel and militarily blockaded Saudi Arabia, sparking the Strait of Bab al-Mandab crisis. The United Arab Emirates, Saudi Arabia, Kuwait, and Bahrain have all launched retaliatory strikes on Iran. Civil conflicts between Iran and Iranian separatist groups, mainly from the Coalition of Political Forces of Iranian Kurdistan and the People's Fighters Front, intensified during the war. Midway through 2026, active military hostilities between the Houthis and Saudi Arabia resumed after the 2022 UN-brokered ceasefire collapsed amid the larger 2026 Iran war.

== Events ==
=== Outbreaks of the Gaza war, Hezbollah–Israel conflict, Red Sea crisis, and the attacks on US bases (October–December 2023) ===
Map of control in and around the Gaza Strip in the Gaza war

On 7 October 2023, the Palestinian militant group Hamas led a attack into Israel from the Gaza Strip that captured territory in southern Israel and killed approximately 1,200 people. The attack did not come as a complete surprise, but "Israeli officials received Hamas' battle plans" in advance but deemed them aspirational and ignored specific warnings. In addition, about 250 Israelis and foreigners were taken into Gaza as hostages by Hamas and other Palestinian armed groups. The attack began with a barrage of over 4,000 rockets and paraglider incursions into Israel. Hamas fighters also breached the Gaza–Israel barrier and massacred civilians in several communities. The attack marked the deadliest day in Israeli history. In response, the Israeli government declared war for the first time since the 1973 Yom Kippur War.

After the Hamas attack, Israel began a bombardment and blockade of the Gaza Strip, which escalated on 13 October into temporary raids into the northern Gaza Strip, and on 27 October to a full-scale invasion of Gaza, with the stated goals of destroying Hamas and freeing the hostages. The war has caused widespread destruction, a humanitarian crisis, and an ongoing famine in the Gaza Strip. Most of the population was forcibly displaced.

The initial phase of the invasion took place in the north of the Gaza Strip, including an Israeli siege of Gaza City that began on 2 November. Hamas and Israel agreed to a six-day truce from 24 November to 30 November that saw Hamas exchange Israeli hostages for Palestinian prisoners held by Israel. After the truce expired in December, Israeli troops had reached the city of Khan Yunis in central Gaza.

A series of border clashes between Israel and the Lebanese militant group Hezbollah along the Israel–Lebanon border began 8 October 2023, when Hezbollah attacked the Shebaa Farms region in support of Hamas's attack on Israel the day prior, and Israel responded by attacking Hezbollah positions in southern Lebanon. Skirmishes between Israel and Hezbollah then continued in southern Lebanon and northern Israel, including in the Israeli-occupied Golan Heights. Hezbollah initially said that it would attack Israel until the latter ended its attacks in Gaza, and Hezbollah's attacks caused 96,000 Israelis to be displaced from northern Israel.

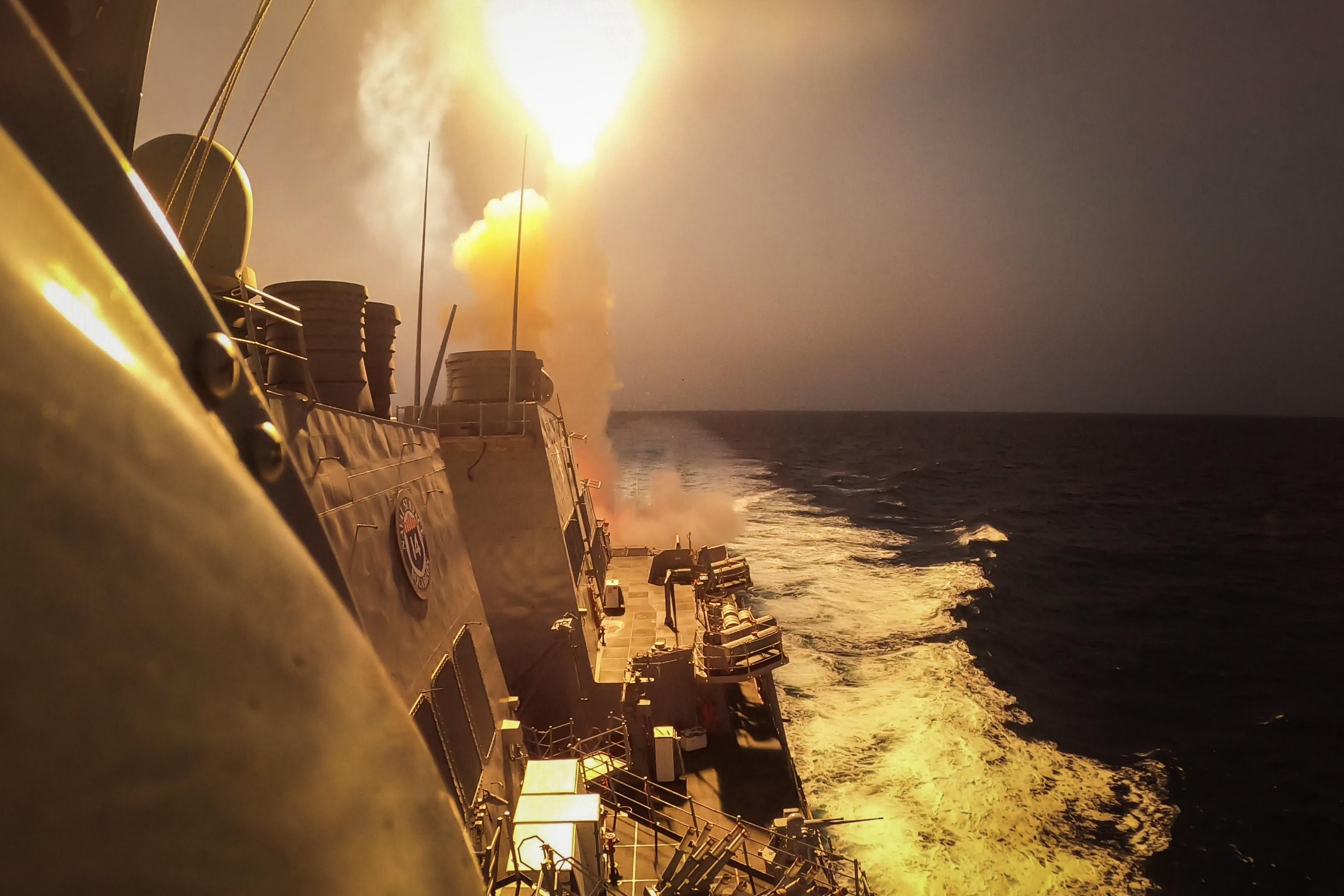
The USS Carney shoots down Houthi missiles targeting Israel over the Red Sea on 19 October 2023.

Shortly after the Gaza war began in October 2023, Houthi militants based in Yemen began targeting civilian merchant and naval vessels passing through the Red Sea. The Houthis said that their attacks would continue until Israel ended its "crimes in Gaza." The group said it would target vessels linked to Israel, but has primarily indiscriminately attacked many vessels with no relation to the country. To avoid attack, many vessels avoided the Suez Canal and Red Sea altogether by sailing around the Cape of Good Hope at the southern tip of Africa, which caused increases in shipping costs. The first confrontation was on 19 October, when a United States Navy guided missile destroyer in the Red Sea shot down Houthi missiles and drones aimed at Israel. The next month, Houthis hijacked the Galaxy Leader and took all 25 of its passengers hostage. In December, the United States created Operation Prosperity Guardian, a multinational naval coalition aimed at combating attacks in the Red Sea. The coalition includes the US, the United Kingdom, Australia, Bahrain, Canada, France, Italy, the Netherlands, New Zealand, Norway, Seychelles, and Spain.

Beginning on 17 October, the Islamic Resistance in Iraq (IRI) and other militias in the Iran-led Axis of Resistance began a series of attacks against United States military bases in Iraq, Jordan, and Syria in response to US support for Israel in the Gaza war. The attacks began with an IRI attack on the US's al-Asad Airbase in northern Iraq that the US intercepted. Regional militias had conducted over 170 attacks against US forces in the region by January 2024, aimed at pressuring the US into withdrawing its troops in the region that it had deployed during the war against the Islamic State. The IRI also conducted attacks against Israel beginning in October 2023.

During the Gaza war, Israeli forces have carried out near-daily incursions and airstrikes in Palestinian communities in the Israeli-occupied territory of the West Bank, some of which have led to clashes with regional Palestinian militias. In the first weeks after Hamas's attack, Israel arrested 63 Hamas members in Tulkarm, and struck a mosque in Jenin it said was used by Hamas and Palestinian Islamic Jihad (PIJ). Simultaneously, attacks by Israeli settlers more than doubled in the war's first month, part of an overall rise in settler violence, which has displaced over 1,500 Palestinians during the war.

From the beginning of the Gaza war in October 2023 to October 2024, Israel launched more than 220 attacks on Syria through air raids and artillery attacks, killing 296 people, but the Syrian government under President Bashar al-Assad largely stayed out of the regional conflict. During the first month of the war, Israel launched attacks on Syrian airports, and across southwestern Syria. It continued strikes in Syria in 2024, including in Damascus, as well as Aleppo.

=== Attacks in Lebanon, Yemen, Iran, Iraq, Syria, Pakistan and Jordan (January–March 2024) ===
On 2 January, Israel conducted an airstrike in the Dahieh suburb of Beirut that assassinated Hamas deputy leader Saleh al-Arouri. Hezbollah responded on 6 January by launching rockets at an Israeli base near Mount Meron; two days later, Israel assassinated the Hezbollah commander it said carried out that attack. In January, Israel also killed Sadegh Omidzadehl, an Iranian general of the Islamic Revolutionary Guard Corps (IRGC) Quds Force alongside 12 others, and the IRI attacked the Israeli city of Ashdod in what it described as the "second phase of operations" in its support for Palestinians in Gaza; two Israeli soldiers have been killed by drone strikes from Iraq.

Map of the Houthi attacks on ships, near the Yemeni coast

On 3 January, the US and 12 other nations issued an ultimatum to the Houthis warning them to stop their attacks or face military action. On 12 January, the US and UK began airstrikes in Houthi-controlled Yemen following a United Nations Security Council resolution that condemned the Houthi attacks. The strikes were ordered by US president Joe Biden and UK prime minister Rishi Sunak authorized British participation. In February 2024, the European Union established Operation Aspides, including Greece, Italy, France, Germany, Belgium, and other EU members; unlike Prosperity Guardian, Aspides is a purely defensive coalition.

After the January 2024 Kerman bombings in Iran in which the Islamic State killed nearly 100 people, Iran conducted a series of strikes in Iraq and Syria that it said targeted an Israeli spy headquarters in Iraqi Kurdistan and Islamic State forces in Syria. Shortly after, Iran conducted strikes in Pakistan targeting Jaish ul-Adl, a Sunni Islamic militant group, to which Pakistan responded with retaliatory strikes against Baloch separatist groups in Iran.

Attacks on US bases largely ended on 4 February at the request of Iran. On 28 January, an IRI attack on a US base in Jordan killed three American service members; the US responded on February 2 by attacking seven sites across Iraq and Syria. Israel began a bombing campaign of the southern Gazan city of Rafah in February.

=== First Iran-Israel direct confrontations (April 2024) ===
On 1 April, Israel targeted the commander of the Quds Force in Syria and Lebanon in a strike on the Iranian consulate in Damascus, killing 16, including its target. Iran had pledged retaliation for the strike, and on 13 April, Iran launched more than 300 missiles and drones towards Israel, of which Israel said it intercepted more than 99 percent. The attack, which was the first-ever direct strike by Iran on Israel, was launched from Iran, Lebanon, Syria, and Yemen. Ballistic missiles from the attack damaged an air base in southern Israel, but the base remained operational. The Israeli defense was aided militarily by the United States, United Kingdom, France, and Jordan. According to the Wall Street Journal, Saudi Arabia and the United Arab Emirates shared intelligence. In response, on 19 April Israel launched a limited airstrike on Iran that targeted an air defense facility. Some attacks on US bases resumed in April.

=== Continued strikes on Yemen, Rafah offensive, West Bank unrest, and the Assassinations of Shukr and Haniyeh (May–August 2024) ===
The US and UK had launched 452 attacks on Houthi territory by May 2024, though the Houthis did not entirely cease their attacks. By May 2024, Houthis had conducted over 50 attacks; Houthi leader Abdul-Malik al-Houthi said his forces had launched 606 ballistic missiles and drones against 107 ships affiliated with Israel and its allies across the Red Sea, Bab-el-Mandeb strait, Gulf of Aden, and Indian Ocean. Houthis killed three sailors, seized one vessel, and sank another. Israel seized the Rafah border crossing on 7 May 2024 as it began an offensive in and around Rafah. Israeli forces pushed deeper into Rafah on 14 May. In July, Israel initiated a second battle in Khan Yunis.

Clashes occurred between the Palestinian Authority (PA) and militant groups opposed to it in the West Bank. The PA has partial administrative authority in the region, and is dominated by Fatah, whose collaborations with the Israeli military for security have been criticized by militias including Hamas and PIJ. Clashes between militants and the PA escalated in July 2024, and in October the PA began a crackdown on militants in Tubas in response to Iranian efforts to undermine the PA in favor of local militias. In December, it began a second offensive in Jenin targeting the Jenin Brigades, an umbrella group of local militias.

After a Houthi drone attack in July 2024 killed one person and injured 10 others near the US embassy office in Tel Aviv, Israel responded by attacking military facilities and oil depots in al-Hudaydah, Yemen, killing at least six and wounding at least 83. On 27 July, 12 children in the Golan Heights were killed in an attack for which Israel accused Hezbollah; in response, Israel killed Hezbollah commander Fuad Shukr in Beirut on 30 July. A day after Shukr's death, Hamas leader, Ismail Haniyeh was assassinated in Tehran by an Israeli airstrike. On 28 August, Israel began an expansive military operation in the West Bank consisting of raids, airstrikes, and the blocking of entry points in Jenin and Tulkarm, marking its largest offensive in the territory since the Second Intifada.

=== Escalation of the Hezbollah–Israel conflict, Iran–Israel strikes, and the killing of Sinwar (September–October 2024) ===
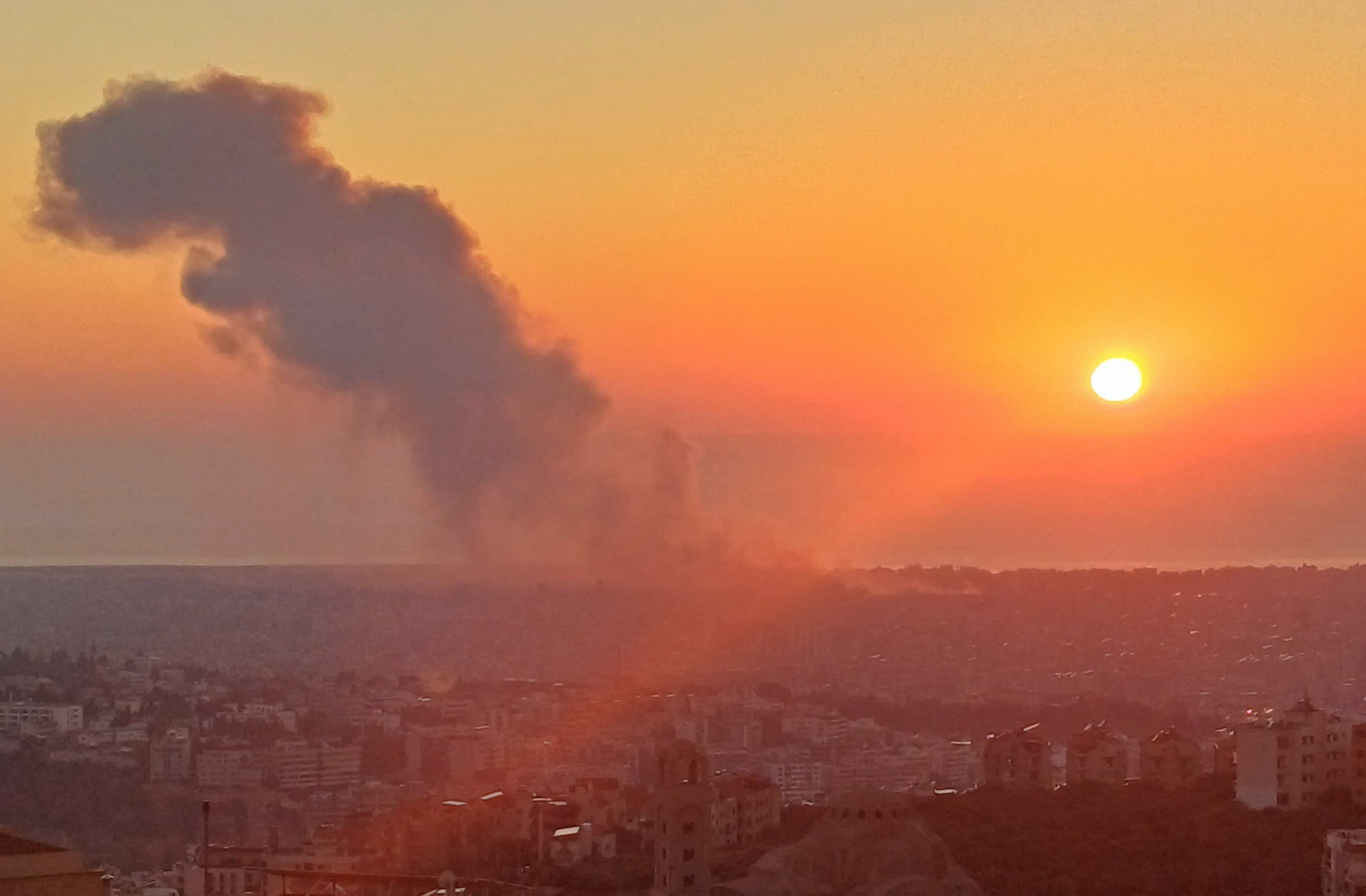
Smoke rises in Beirut, Lebanon following the Israeli air raid that killed the leader of Hezbollah, Hassan Nasrallah, on 27 September 2024

Israel attacked Yemen again in September, killing six and injuring 57 others. Israeli forces also raided Masyaf, Syria, killing at least 18 people. In September 2024, an Israeli operation resulted in the simultaneous explosion of thousands of pagers used by Hezbollah on 17 September and hundreds of walkie-talkies the next day, killing 42 people. The attacks marked the beginning of an intensive Israeli campaign against Hezbollah, and in the ensuing days Israel continued attacks in Lebanon and conducted a massive aerial bombardment that killed more than 700 people, including a 20 September attack that killed Hezbollah Redwan Force commander Ibrahim Aqil. On 27 September, Israel assassinated Hassan Nasrallah, the leader of Hezbollah, in an attack on the group's headquarters in Beirut.

On 1 October, Israel began an invasion of southern Lebanon that it said was to eliminate the threat posed by Hezbollah and allow the 63,000 Israelis still displaced to return to their homes. By 15 October, over 25 percent of Lebanon was under Israeli evacuation orders, and during the invasion Israel captured and destroyed several villages and towns in southern Lebanon while it continued airstrikes across the country. During the conflict, more than 3,700 people in Lebanon were killed and about 1.3 million were displaced.

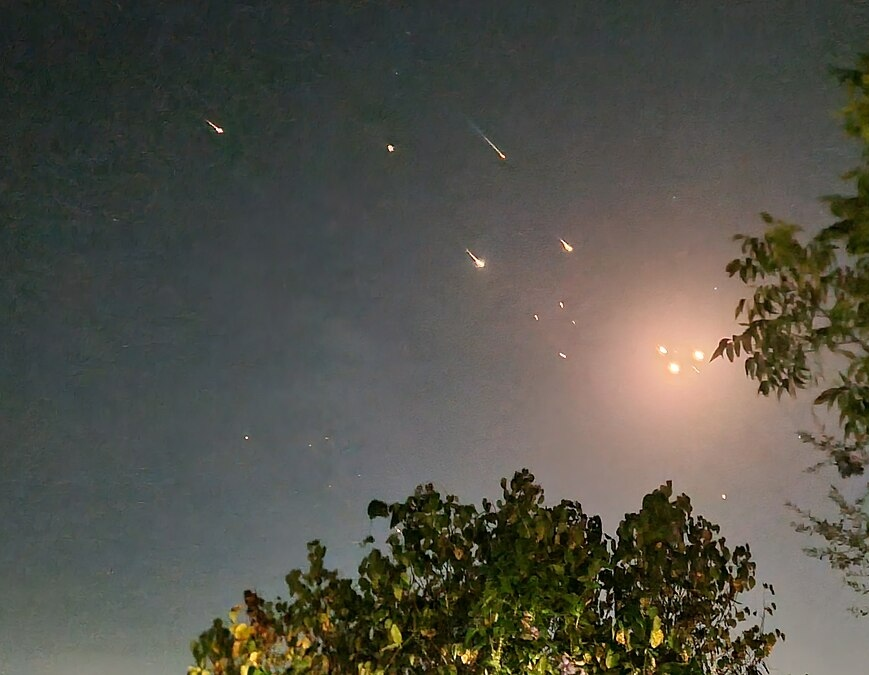
Missile interceptions in Lower Galilee during the 1 October 2024 Iranian attack on Israel

Also on 1 October, in retaliation for the Israeli assassinations of Ismail Haniyeh in Tehran, and of Hassan Nasrallah and Abbas Nilforoushan in Beirut —Iran launched a second direct attack on Israel that consisted of roughly 200 ballistic missiles. The US, UK, France, and Jordan again helped Israel repel most of the Iranian attack. Shrapnel from the attack killed one Palestinian civilian in the West Bank. Israel retaliated on 26 October, in the largest attack on Iran since the Iran–Iraq War, with over 100 Israeli aircraft targeting Iran's radar and air defense systems. Israel said the attack severely damaged Iran's air defense and missile production capabilities.

On 16 October, the Israeli military killed the leader of Hamas, Yahya Sinwar, hence achieving a major goal of Israel's invasion of Gaza. In October, Israeli strikes killed 13 people in Damascus and 10 in al-Quasyr. In November, Israeli strikes killed 23 people in Syria targeting Palestinian Islamic Jihad, and killed 92 Iran-backed fighters from various groups later that month in Palmyra.

=== Fall of the Assad Regime and the Israel invasion of Syria (November–December 2024) ===
On 27 November, Israel and Hezbollah agreed to a 60-day ceasefire intended to lead to a lasting end to the conflict. Despite both Israel and Hezbollah continuing to exchange attacks and accusing the other of violating the ceasefire, the agreement largely held.

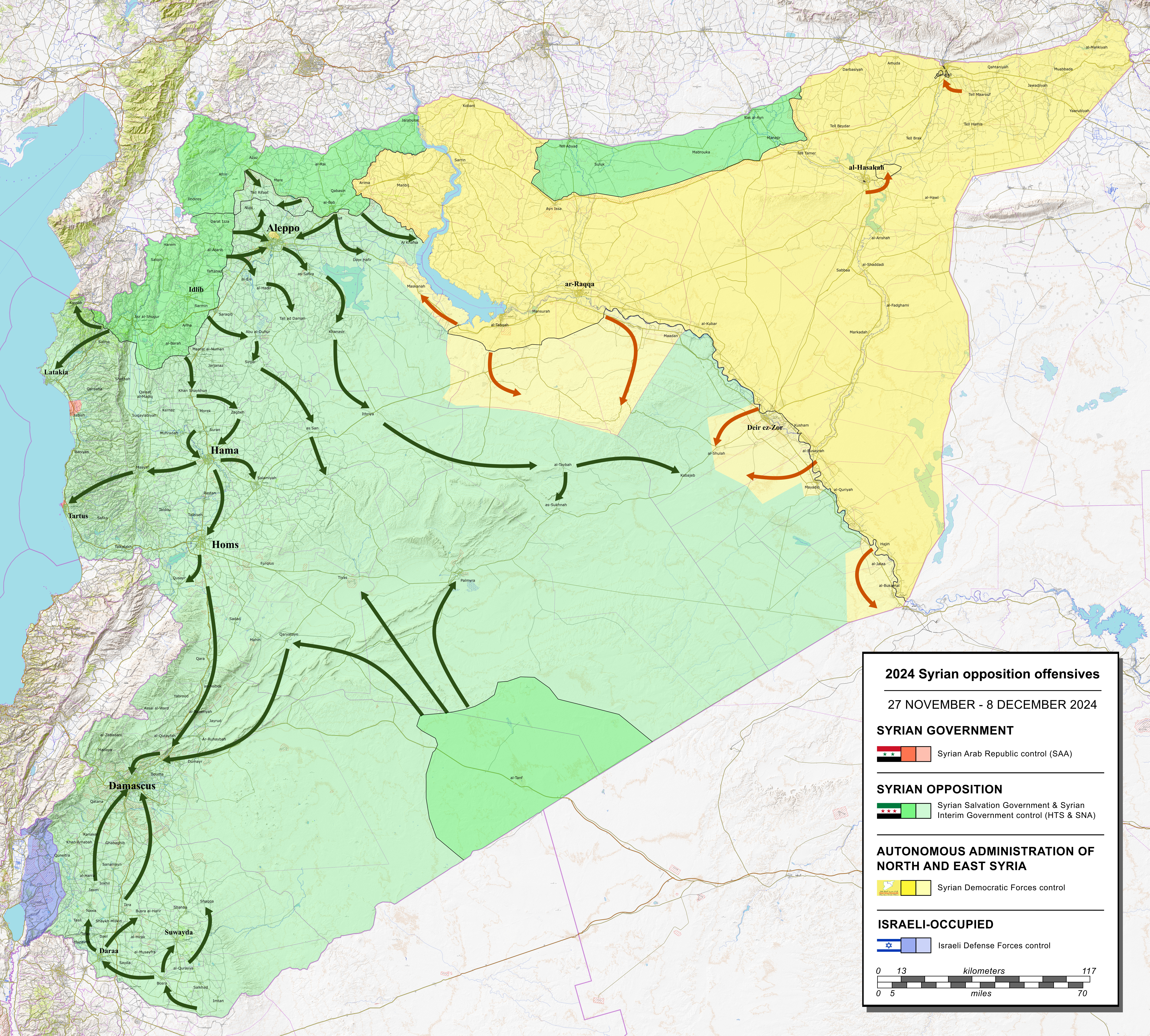
A map of rebel advances during the Syrian opposition offensives that resulted in the fall of the Assad regime on 8 December 2024

Also on 27 November, a coalition of Syrian opposition groups launched a surprise offensive against the Syrian government led by Bashar al-Assad in the country's northwest. The offensive came after key allies of the Assad government—Russia, Iran, and Hezbollah—were weakened by other conflicts. Led by Hay'at Tahrir al-Sham(HTS) and supported by Turkish-backed rebels, the offensive was the first since the 2020 ceasefire that largely halted major fighting in the Syrian civil war, which began in 2011.

By 30 November, HTS had taken control of most of Aleppo, after which Russia intervened to conduct airstrikes on rebel positions there. By 1 December, the rebels had gained control of significant amounts of land in the governorates of Hama, Idlib, and Aleppo, and were beginning an offensive into the city of Hama. Hama fell to the HTS on 5 December, and on 7 December they had moved south to capture the city of Homs, effectively separating the government in Damascus from Syria's coast. Meanwhile, the Southern Operations Room began an assault on the government in Daraa and began pushing into the southern suburbs of Damascus, while the Syrian Free Army, which had captured Palmyra, approached Damascus from the east.

Damascus fell to the rebels in the early morning of 8 December, 11 days after the offensive began, and HTS proclaimed the end of the Assad regime as Assad fled the country for Moscow. HTS leader Ahmed al-Sharaa became the de facto leader of Syria, and established a transitional government led by Mohammed al-Bashir as the country's caretaker prime minister until March 2025.

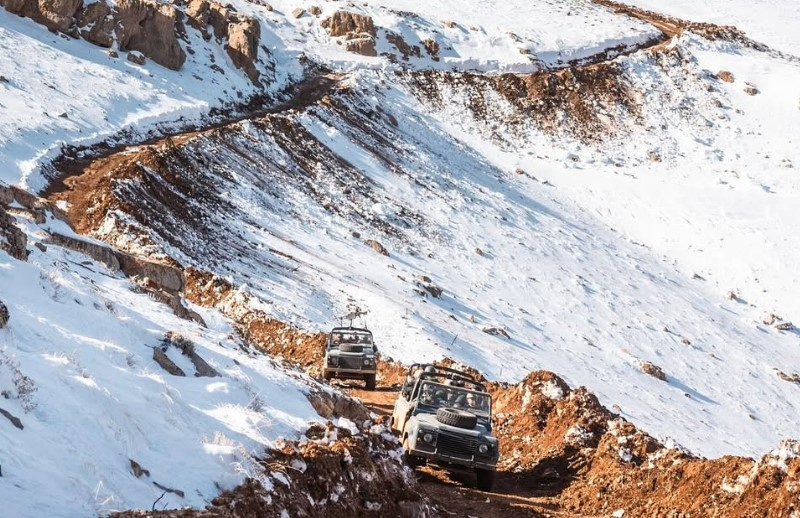
Soldiers in the Israeli Shaldag Unit on the Syrian side of Mount Hermon, 13 December 2024

After the fall of the Assad regime, Netanyahu said that the 1974 Israel–Syria border agreement had "collapsed" and ordered the Israeli military to begin an invasion of the buffer zone in Syria along the Golan Heights. Israel seized Syria's side of Mount Hermon, occupied border villages in Syrian-controlled parts of the Golan Heights, and bombed targets across Damascus and southern Syria in addition to abandoned Syrian Arab Armed Forces (SAAF) weapons stockpiles and airbases. On 9 December, Israel carried out over 100 airstrikes across Syria, including a strike on the Port of Latakia. Israel justified its attacks, which destroyed much of the former SAAF's naval and air assets and its air defenses, as necessary to prevent extremists from capturing abandoned weapons; al-Sharaa condemned Israel's actions but said Syria would not enter a new conflict. Iraqi militias agreed with the Iraqi government to stop attacking Israel in December 2024. After Houthi attacks in December 2024, Israel launched two waves of strikes against Houthi territory in al-Hudaydah and Sanaa, killing a total of 13 people. Israeli attacks on the Houthis in Yemen continued into 2025.

=== Gaza ceasefire attempt and the US strikes on the Houthis (January–May 2025) ===
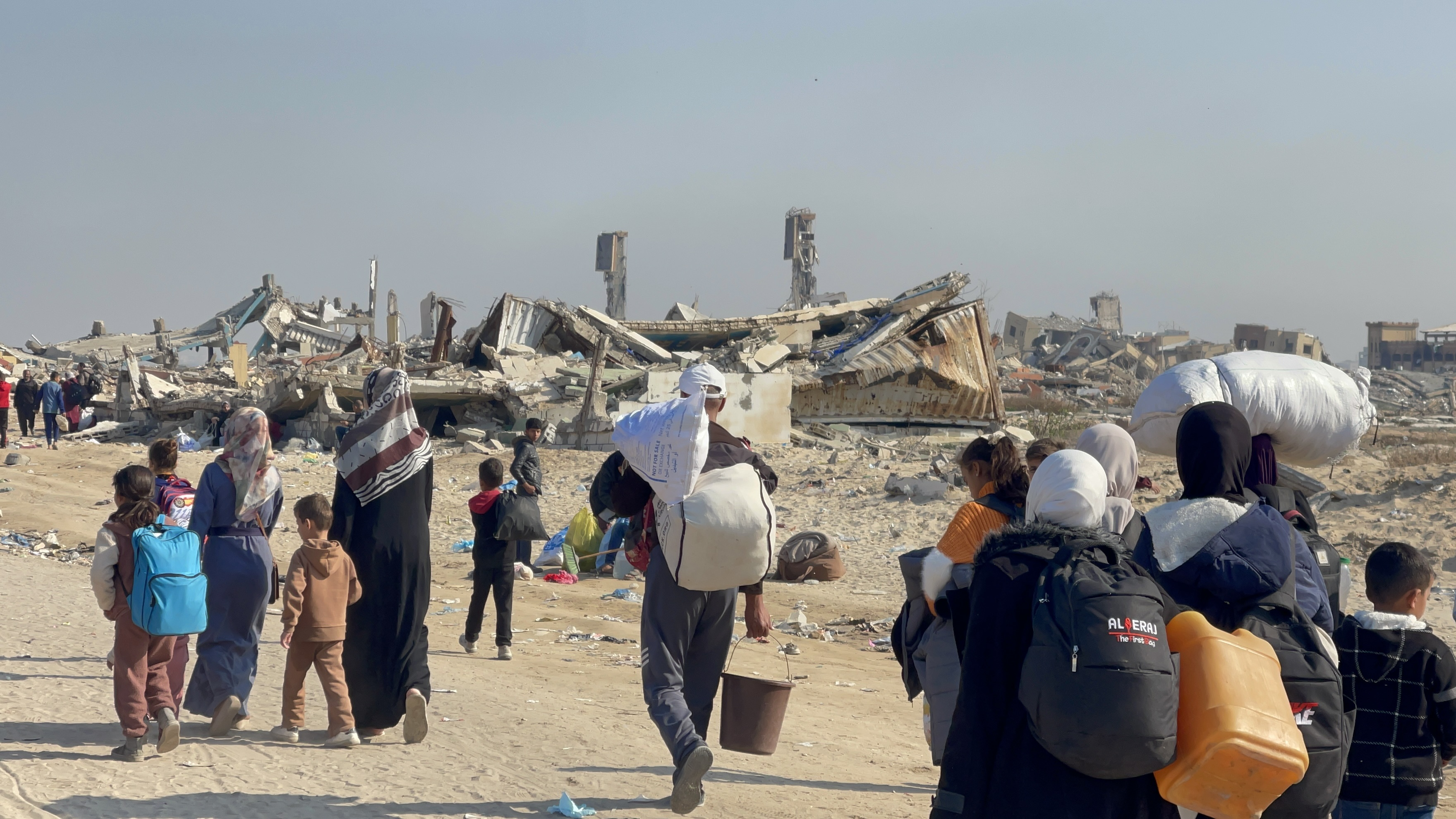
Displaced Palestinians walking in Gaza during the ceasefire, 29 January 2025

On 15 January, Israel and Hamas agreed to a ceasefire that would halt fighting in the Gaza Strip upon its ratification and lead to the release of 33 Israeli hostages in exchange for Palestinian prisoners. It went into effect four days later, with Hamas retaining control over the Gaza Strip. On 21 January, Israel launched its first major post-ceasefire raid, targeting Jenin, and announced that it intended to maintain a long-term military presence in the city, marking a shift in strategy. On 18 March, Israel launched surprise airstrikes on Gaza as Israeli Prime Minister Binyamin Netanyahu said that Hamas had refused to release more hostages or accept a US proposal to extend the ceasefire.

On 15 March, the US said that it had begun aerial and naval strikes on dozens of Houthi targets in Yemen after President Donald Trump ordered an escalated military campaign against the Houthis. After the March 2025 Israeli strikes on Gaza, the Houthis pledged escalation on 18 March. In April, Iranian forces withdrew from Yemen, and US strikes targeted the Ras Isa oil terminal in western Yemen and hit a detention center in Yemen's Saada Governorate. On 4 May, a Houthi attack hit the Ben Gurion Airport in Israel; in response, Israel carried out retaliatory attacks on Yemen, including an attack on Sanaa International Airport. On 6 May, a United States–Houthi ceasefire agreement mediated by Oman came into effect, ending the American and British attacks on Yemen. The Houthis agreed to end their attacks in the Red Sea but said the agreement did not apply to attacks on Israel.

After Donald Trump's letter to Ali Khamenei, IRGC Navy seized two oil tankers in Persian Gulf belonging to Saudis in March 2025. The following month, the French minister of foreign affairs stated that if Iran were to develop a nuclear weapon, war would be almost inevitable. US President Trump said that Iran wants direct negotiations, and IRGC General Hossein Salami asserted that Iranians are ready for war should the US attack first.

=== Twelve-Day War (June 2025) ===
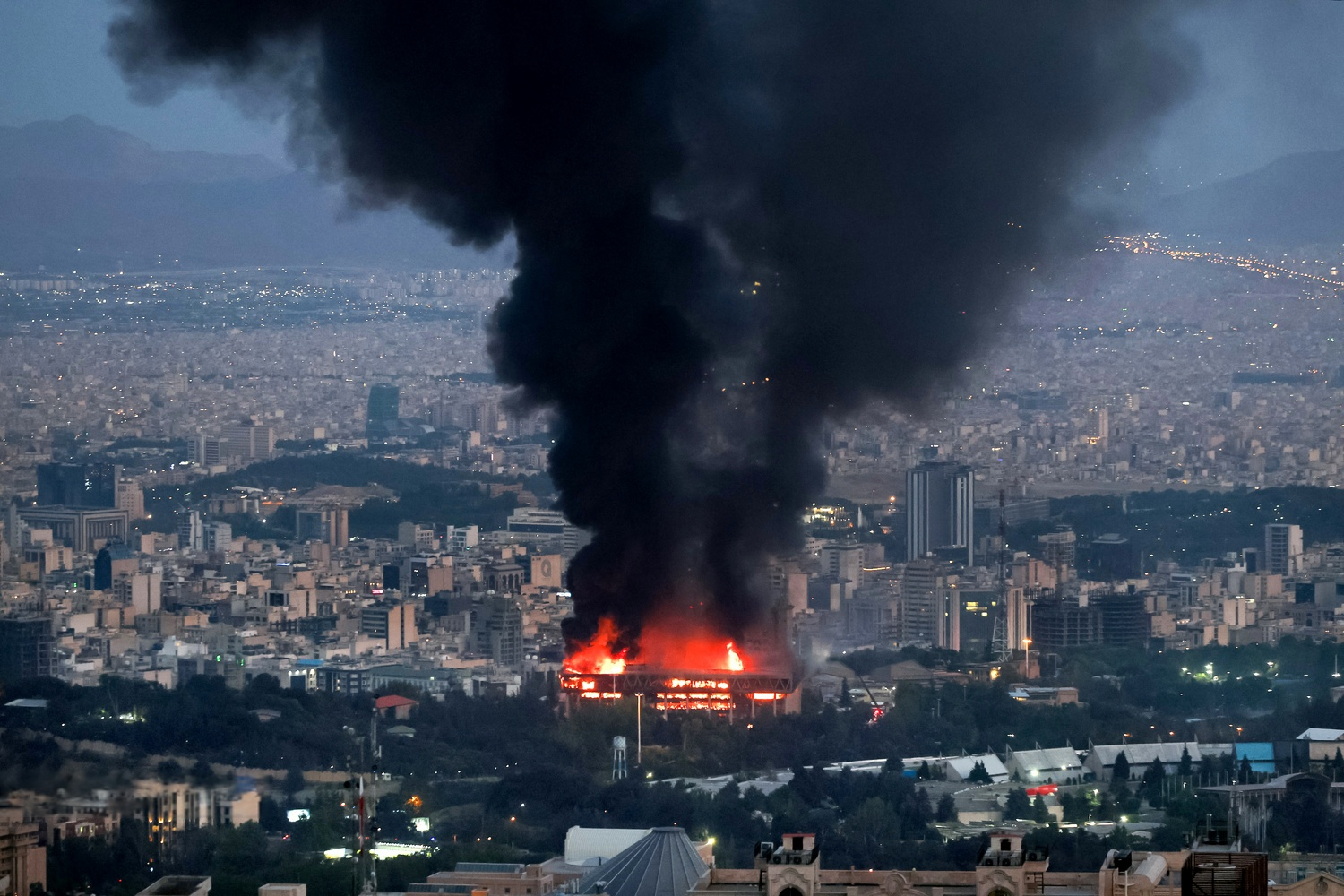
Aerial view of IRIB headquarters in Tehran, following Israeli airstrikes, 16 June 2025

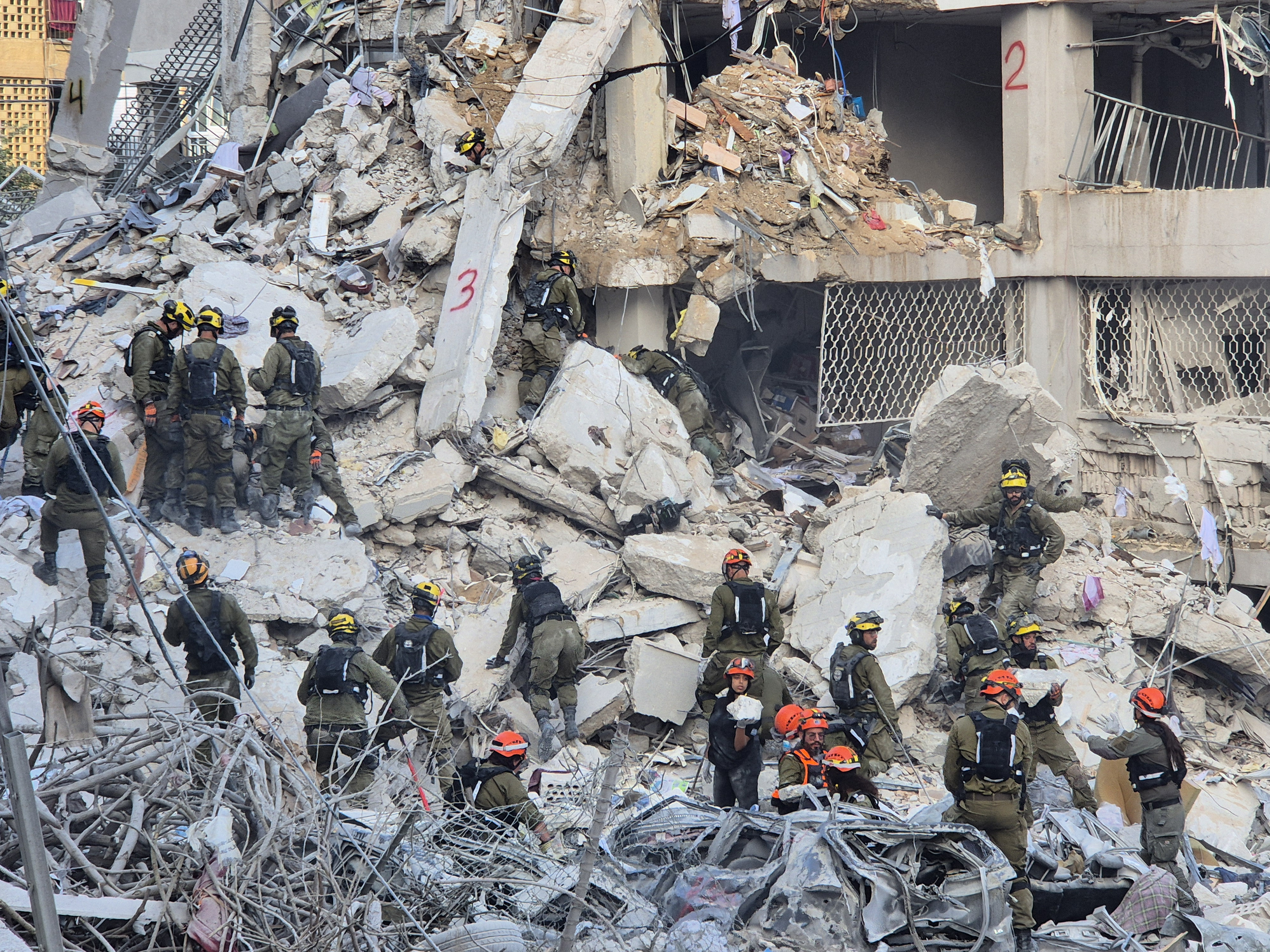
The aftermath of an Iranian strike in Bat Yam, Israel, on 15 June 2025

On 13 June, Israel launched large-scale attacks against targets in several areas in Iran which began the Twelve-Day War. Israel targeted nuclear facilities, military installations, and the private residences of senior officials, causing damage to key nuclear sites and killing Iran's top military leadership. Islamic Revolutionary Guard Corps (IRGC) commander Hossein Salami, Iranian Armed Forces Chief of Staff Major General Mohammad Bagheri, and nuclear scientists Fereydoon Abbasi and Mohammad Mehdi Tehranchi were killed in the attacks, according to Iranian state media. The attacks killed Iranian military members as well as civilians.

On 21 June, US President Trump announced the US had attacked multiple nuclear sites in Iran, including Fordow Fuel Enrichment Plant, Natanz Nuclear Facility, and a third site in Isfahan in support of Israel and to attempt to completely destroy the Iranian nuclear program. The international community reacted with alarm at the escalation. On 23 June, Iran retaliated for the US airstrikes on their nuclear facilities by firing at least 14 short-range and medium-range ballistic missiles at the Al Udeid Air Base in Qatar. Nearly all of the missiles were shot down.

=== Israel strike on Doha and the Gaza peace deal (July–December 2025) ===
CCTV footage of the Israeli attack on Doha, 9 September 2025

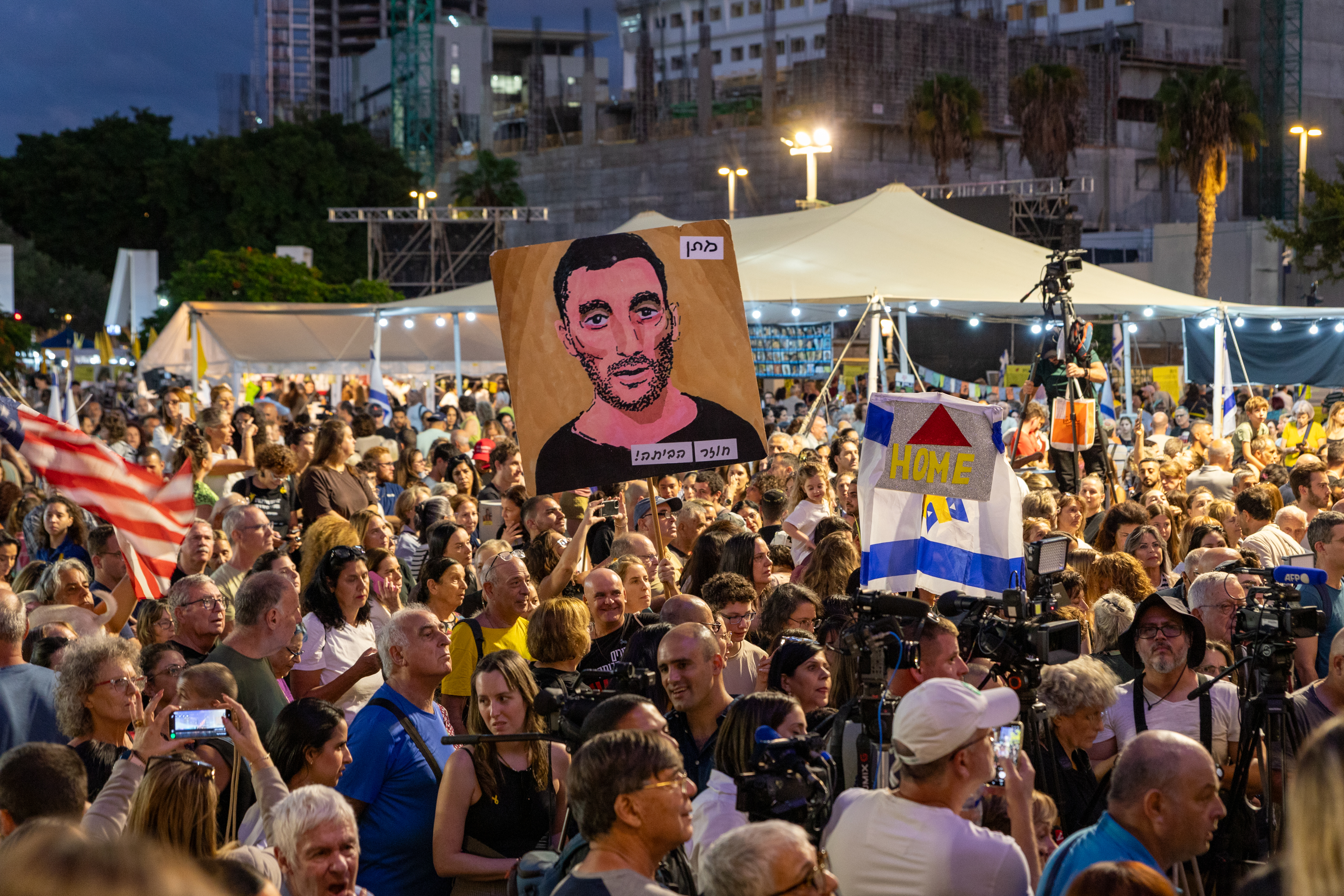
Celebrations in Israel's Hostage Square after the announcement of a hostage release deal, 9 October 2025

On 9 September, Israel bombed the Hamas headquarters in Qatar, reportedly targeting several members of the Hamas temporary committee, including Khalil al-Hayya, Khaled Mashal, Muhammad Ismail Darwish, Musa Abu Marzouk, and Zaher Jabarin. Hamas confirmed that its top leadership survived the attack, although six people had been killed, including al-Hayya's son Humam, his aide, three bodyguards, and a Qatari security officer. On 15 September, Israeli forces launched an offensive in Gaza City, deploying units from two armored and infantry divisions. On 10 October, a Gaza ceasefire went into effect.

=== Iranian protests and massacres, US–Iran tensions (December 2025–January 2026) ===
On 28 December 2025, demonstrations erupted across Iran amid nationwide unrest over an economic crisis, which had been developing over several years and worsened by fears of renewed conflict, following the Twelve-Day War in June and reimposition of UN nuclear-related sanctions through the "snapback" mechanism. US Secretary of the Treasury Scott Bessent labelled the collapse of the Iranian currency in December 2025 as the "grand culmination" of the US strategy of sanctions against Iran. On 13 January 2026, Iran International reported that at least 12,000 people had been killed. It described the killings as the "largest massacre in Iranian contemporary history". On 11 February 2026, Iranian President Masoud Pezeshkian apologized to the nation for the massacres.

Beginning in late January 2026, the United States carried out its largest military buildup in the Middle East since the 2003 invasion of Iraq, deploying air, naval, and missile defense assets amid escalating tensions with Iran, which the United States has attributed to Iran's nuclear program, the 2025–2026 Iranian protests, and a government crackdown that killed thousands of demonstrators.

=== Iran war (February–July 2026) ===
On 28 February 2026, this culminated in joint military strikes on Iran by the United States and Israel, sparking the 2026 Iran war. Among the war's stated aims are destroying Iran's missile program and bringing about regime change. Iran responded with missile and drone strikes against Israel, US bases and allies in the region.

The 2026 war began with joint airstrikes by Israel and the US against military and government sites in Tehran, Isfahan, Qom, Karaj, and Kermanshah. Ali Khamenei was assassinated in a strike on his compound, and other Iranian officials were also killed. Israeli and US attacks resulted in civilian casualties and damage to schools, hospitals, the Grand Bazaar in Tehran, and the Golestan Palace. In retaliation, Iran launched hundreds of drones and ballistic missiles at targets in Israel and at US military bases in Qatar, Bahrain, the United Arab Emirates, Kuwait, Iraq, Jordan, and Saudi Arabia. Iranian strikes hit civilian infrastructure in Azerbaijan, Israel, Kuwait, Oman, Qatar, Saudi Arabia, and the UAE, and Britain's Akrotiri and Dhekelia military base on Cyprus was struck by a drone. Iraqi militias of the Popular Mobilization Forces engaged in attacks against US assets in the region in retaliation against the attacks on Iran and had been subjected to US-Israeli strikes. On 7 March, president Masoud Pezeshkian apologized for strikes on neighboring countries, attributing them to "miscommunication in the ranks", and said those countries would no longer be targeted unless US attacks are launched from them, yet the Iranian attacks continued on those countries. This underscored the limited control exercised by the Iran's leaders over the paramilitary Revolutionary Guard. Iran closed the Strait of Hormuz and attacked energy facilities, disrupting global oil and gas shipments. The conflict between Hezbollah and Israel escalated into the 2026 Lebanon war. The Houthis later joined the war on 28 March by launching ballistic missiles at Israel.

According to Reuters, citing Western and Iranian officials, the Saudi Air Force launched numerous unpublicized "tit-for-tat" strikes on Iranian soil in late March 2026, in retaliation for Iranian attacks on Saudi Arabia. The New York Times, citing US officials, corroborated reports of Saudi strikes on Iran. According to The Wall Street Journal, Kuwait launched attacks on Iran-backed Iraqi militias from its own territory. Iraqi officials reported at least two rocket attacks from Kuwaiti territory in April; according to Reuters, it was unclear whether they were launched by the Kuwaiti Armed Forces or the US military. Since the start of the war, Iran engaged in attacks against Iranian Kurdish separatist groups making up the Coalition of Political Forces of Iranian Kurdistan (formed on 22 February), including with drone and missile attacks in western Iran and Iraq.

On 8 April, the United States, Israel and Iran agreed to a two-week long ceasefire, the Islamabad Accords. Israeli Prime Minister Benjamin Netanyahu asserted that the ceasefire does not apply to Lebanon as Israel conducted massive strikes on the country, contradicting mediator Pakistani Prime Minister Shehbaz Sharif's announcement.

According to The Wall Street Journal and Bloomberg, citing "people familiar with the matter", and The New York Times, citing current and former US officials, the UAE discreetly carried out retaliatory attacks against Iran, including a strike on an oil refinery at Lavan Island on 8 April. Reuters also reported that the Saudi Air Force struck Iran-backed Iraqi militias near the Iraqi–Saudi border around the time of the ceasefire.

On 16 April, President Trump announced that Israel and Lebanon agreed to a temporary 10-day truce. On 17 April, Iran announced that passage of commercial vessels through the Hormuz Strait is completely open during the truce in Lebanon. On 18 April, Iran said that it closed the Strait of Hormuz again in response to the US refusing to lift its naval blockade. On 21 April, President Trump said that he extended the Iran truce to allow time for an Iranian proposal to be submitted at Pakistan's request. On 23 April, President Trump announced that Israel and Lebanon agreed to a three-week extension of the ceasefire. On 3 May, Trump said that the US will help free up ships in the Strait of Hormuz beginning the next morning. On 4 May, the Iranian military warned the US to keep out of Hormuz. Two days later, Trump halted this mission, citing "great progress" at a potential deal. On 15 May, the truce was extended by Israel and Lebanon for another 45 days.

On 1 May, Kuwait said its soldiers exchanged fire with six members of Iran's Islamic Revolutionary Guards Corps, and arrested four, during an Iranian raid on Bubiyan Island.

On 8 June, following reported alleged ceasefire violations in Lebanon, including Israeli strikes on the Dahiyeh suburb of Beirut, hostilities escalated further between Israel and Iran. Iran launched strikes against Israel in response, including an attack on Ramat David Airbase, followed by Israeli airstrikes on multiple Iranian cities, with explosions reported in several locations in western and central Iran. Iran subsequently carried out additional missile attacks against Israel, targeting the Tel Nof and Nevatim airbases.

On 14 June, Trump and Iran announced that they had reached an agreement to end the 2026 Iran war and reopen the Strait of Hormuz. Trump also said that he had authorized the lifting of the US naval blockade. The agreement was expected to be signed on 19 June in Switzerland.

On 15 June, Pakistan, the primary mediator, stated that both the United States and Iran declared the "immediate and permanent termination of military operations on all fronts, including in Lebanon" as part of the agreement to end the 2026 Iran war. Israel stated that its forces will remain in Lebanon.

On 17 June, Trump and Pezeshkian signed the memorandum of understanding to end the war, with Trump signing the document during dinner with French President Emmanuel Macron at the Palace of Versailles after the G7 summit.

On 18 June, Pakistan stated that the signing of the US-Iran memorandum of understanding to end the war implies Tehran will reopen the Hormuz "instantly" and the American blockade of Iranian ports will end "immediately." On the same day, CENTCOM announced that it had removed the naval blockade of Iranian ports.

On 19 June, Trump announced a renewed ceasefire between Israel and Hezbollah, facilitated by the US, Qatar, and Iran. Hezbollah said that it attacked Israeli forces who tried to seize Ali al-Taher, Nabatieh. Israel continued to strike southern Lebanon numerous times. On 20 June, Iran declared that it closed the Strait of Hormuz again due to Israeli strikes in Lebanon, describing them as a violation of its deal with the US. This claim was denied by the US military.

In July, The Wall Street Journal reported that Kuwait and Bahrain launched airstrikes inside Iran.

On 8 July, Trump declared that the MOU with Iran was "over" after Iran launched attacks on commercial vessels in the Strait of Hormuz to assert Iranian sovereignty over the Strait of Hormuz, startling US officials and shattering a brief diplomatic calm and he did not want to continue dealing with the Iranian regime, which he referred to as "sick people." Trump later indicated that US negotiators can continue negotiations, but he voiced pessimism regarding the potential results.

=== Escalation of the Yemeni civil war and the insurgency in Sistan and Balochistan (July 2026–present) ===
On 20 July, the Houthis declared a blockade of Saudi Arabian ports and ships in the Bab-el-Mandeb. Following a serious logistical dispute in mid-July 2026 amid the broader 2026 Iran war, direct military confrontation between Saudi Arabia and the Houthis resumed.

Beginning in September and October, Iran and the People's Fighters Front, an Iranian Baloch separatist group, engaged in an intensified series of clashes in the Sistan and Balochistan province, in part resulting in large-scale casualties of the pro-Iran Shiite militia group Liwa Fatemiyoun.

== Casualties ==
According to the Gaza Health Ministry (GHM), since the start of the Israeli invasion of the Gaza Strip, over 73,000 Palestinians in Gaza have been killed as of September 2026. A study in The Lancet estimated 64,260 deaths in Gaza from traumatic injuries by June 2024, while noting a potentially larger death toll when "indirect" deaths are included. As of May 2025, a comparable figure for traumatic injury deaths would be 93,000. Another casualty analysis, published in February 2026, estimated 75,200 violent deaths and 8,540 excess non-violent deaths between 7 October 2023 and 5 January 2025. The estimate of violent deaths is 34.7% higher than the GHM's casualty count at the time. Of the violent deaths, the researchers estimate that 56.2% were women, children, and elderly individuals. More than 174,000 Palestinians in Gaza have been injured in the war.

The GHM does not distinguish between civilians and combatants; the IDF said that it has killed more than 24,000 militants, while Hamas said in April 2024 that it had lost no more than 20 percent, or about 6,000, of its fighters. An Associated Press analysis of GHM data up to December 2025 found that women and children comprised almost half of all identified dead, a statistic often used as a proxy for civilian casualties. Several human rights organizations such as Amnesty International and B'Tselem, various genocide studies and international law scholars, and other experts say that a genocide is taking place in Gaza, though various others dispute this.

In Israel, the 7 October Hamas-led attack resulted in the deaths of 1,195 people, including 815 civilians. Of the 251 people from Israel taken to Gaza as hostages on October 7, 166 were returned to Israel alive and 85 were returned dead, including three killed by friendly fire. At least 405 Israeli soldiers and one officer were killed during the Israeli invasion of Gaza. Eighty Israeli soldiers and 46 civilians have been killed in the conflict with Hezbollah; violence in the West Bank has killed 25 Israelis, including six soldiers and police. The United Nations Human Rights Council said there was "clear evidence" of war crimes by both Israel and Hamas during the war, and human-rights organizations have accused Hamas and other militias of committing crimes against humanity in the 7 October attack.

In Lebanon, Israeli attacks killed at least 4,047 people and wounded at least 16,638 others as of December 2024. Hezbollah has confirmed 521 of its members were dead, and the Syrian Observatory for Human Rights reported that 67 Hezbollah members have been killed in Syria since the outbreak of the Gaza war. The Israeli military estimated that that around 3,800 Hezbollah members died in the conflict, while media reports claimed Hezbollah believes its death toll could be as high as 4,000. Initial clashes in southern Lebanon also killed at least 20 members of Hamas and Palestinian Islamic Jihad. According to Lebanon's ministry of public health, fourteen journalists have been killed by Israeli attacks while reporting on the conflict.

In the West Bank, 607 Palestinians were killed by August 2024, primarily due to Israeli military raids. Additionally, the Palestinian Authority's offensive in Jenin resulted in the death of six PA soldiers, four Palestinian militants, and three civilians. During the Red Sea crisis, the Houthis have killed four sailors in the Red Sea, while in December 2023 US strikes on Houthi boats in the Red Sea killed at least 10 Houthi members, and by the end of May 2024 the US and UK airstrikes in Houthi-controlled Yemen had killed 56 people and injured 77 others. Five US soldiers died in January 2024: two were lost at sea on a mission to seize Iranian weapons and three were killed in an IRI attack in Jordan that injured 47 others.

== Political and legal impact ==
Prior to the outbreak of war, the United States had aimed to expand the 2020 Abraham Accords into a diplomatic normalization agreement between Israel and Saudi Arabia that would likely include a defense agreement between the US and Saudi Arabia. The US had scheduled a negotiation between Netanyahu and a Saudi ambassador to take place in Tel Aviv in November 2023. However, the Hamas attack on 7 October and ensuing Israeli invasion of Gaza meant that the meeting could not take place. Later in 2024, Saudi Crown Prince Mohamed bin Salman said that any Saudi–Israeli normalization agreement would require Palestinian statehood as part of a two-state solution.

Since 2023, Israel has expanded its military occupation of territories in Gaza, Syria, and Lebanon to its greatest extent in decades, amounting to about 1,000 square kilometers (386 square miles) as of June 2026. It is the equivalent of 5% of Israel's original territory at its founding. The month, Israeli defense minister Israel Katz said that Israel will keep its troops in the "security zones" within Gaza, Syria, and Lebanon "indefinitely."

=== United Nations ===
On 29 December 2023, South Africa brought a case against Israel before the International Court of Justice accusing Israel of committing genocide against Palestinians in the Gaza Strip during the Gaza war, in violation of the Genocide Convention. South Africa requested that the ICJ order an immediate halt to Israel's military operations in Gaza among other provisional measures of protection. Israel has contended that its actions in Gaza are targeted only at Hamas and are in legitimate self-defense in accordance with international law. On 26 January 2024, the ICJ said in a preliminary ruling that some of the acts claimed by South Africa in its allegations could be covered by the Genocide Convention and that Israel must "take all measures within its power" to prevent genocide in Gaza.

Prior to the January 2025 ceasefire that halted the Gaza war, the United Nations Security Council made numerous attempts to negotiate a ceasefire. The United States vetoed a February 2024 resolution demanding a ceasefire for not including a condemnation of the 7 October attack, and on 22 March Russia and China vetoed a US-drafted resolution calling for an immediate six-week ceasefire conditional on the release of hostages. On 25 March, the UNSC passed Resolution 2728, which called for a ceasefire during the month of Ramadan, the "immediate and unconditional" release of all hostages, and the allowance of humanitarian aid into Gaza. The US vetoed a later ceasefire resolution in November 2024, saying this was due to the fact that the resolution did not require the immediate release of all hostages.

== See also ==
- Democracy in the Middle East and North Africa
- List of modern conflicts in the Middle East
- War on terror
