= Western Iran clashes =

Western Iran clashes may refer to:

- Western Iran clashes (2016–2023)
- Western Iran clashes (2026–present)
