= People's Fighters Front =

Baloch nationalist militant organization

- جبهه مبارزین مردمی
- Other name: PFF, JMM
- Head of the political office: Abdul Rahman Baloch
- Spokesperson: Mahmud Baloch
- Founded: 10 December 2025
- Dates active: 2025–present
- Country: Iran
- Ideology: Baloch nationalism Sunni Islamism; Anti-Khomeinism
- Status: Active
- Wars: Balochistan insurgency; Sistan and Balochistan insurgency; 2025–2026 Iranian protests; 2026 Iran war; Sistan and Balochistan clashes (2026–present)

The People's Fighters Front (Persian: جبهه مبارزین مردمی, romanized: Jabheh-yi Mubarizin-i Mardumi, abbreviated as PFF or JMM), is a Baloch nationalist militant organization mainly operating in the Sistan and Balochistan province in southeastern Iran. It was founded in late 2025 as a merger of several Sunni Baloch militias, including Jaysh al-Adl, and has been a participant in the Sistan and Balochistan insurgency. The PFF's masked spokesperson is Mahmud Baloch.

Following the onset of the 2026 Iran war, the PFF vowed further conflicts against Iran and had repeatedly clashed with Iranian personnel with multiple casualties reported on both sides since June 2026.

== History ==
=== Background ===
Before the official formation of the group, Iran's IRGC had launched multiple counterterrorism and counterinsurgency operations in 2024 and 2025 targeting the group's strongest subgroup, Jaysh al-Adl, inflicting losses on the group, which continued even after the PFF was formed.

On November 29 Jaish al Adl, announced that it had merged with other Baloch groups in order to better its fight against Iran.

=== Establishment ===
On 10 December 2025, multiple militias such as Jaysh al-Adl, Nasr Movement, Pada Baloch Movement, Muhammad Rasul Allah Group and others announced the formation of a single united organization called the "People's Fighters Front" (PFF). The PFF announced that it seeks to restore and "protect the economic, political, cultural, and religious dignity" of Iranians and overthrow the "Velayat-e-Faqih regime", which refers to Iran.

The flag of the PFF is similar to flags of other Baloch nationalist groups, especially in Pakistan. According to their own statement, green represents hope, red represents resistance and white represents honesty and unity while the blue crescent is a symbol of Balochi culture.

==== Response to establishment ====
On 13 December 2025, after the group's formation, senior Brigadier General Ali Jahanshahi, the Commander of the Islamic Republic of Iran Army's Ground Forces, appointed junior Brigadier General Abbas Malekizadeh as the new commander of the Ground Forces' Southeast Regional Headquarters in order to help counter the group after its formation.

== Groups ==
- Jaysh al-Adl: founded in 2012 by former Jundallah members, there is very little known about the group. The group was founded and led by Salahuddin Farooqui who has opposed Iranian support for Syria in the Syrian Civil War. They have claimed responsibility for dozens of attacks since 2013, reportedly using guerrilla tactics, ambush methods, and remotely controlled IEDs and land mines. Jaish-ul-Adl's founder and leader, Salahuddin Farooqui, was killed in a joint-operation by Iran and Pakistan against it in late 2024. Farooqi's brother, Amir Naroui, was killed by the Taliban-led Islamic Emirate of Afghanistan. In the wake of the Twelve-Day War, Jaysh al-Adl reportedly called on the people of Balochistan to join the group. IRGC-affiliated media stated that Jaish al Adl had a special intelligence branch focused specifically on assassinating Sunni leaders within the Iranian government. A UN report stated that there was cooperation between ISKP and Jaish al-Adl, with ISIL-K providing suicide bombers to Jaish al-Adl for its operations, including those for an attack on military stations in Rask and Chabahar in Sistan and Baluchestan Province, which occurred on 2 April 2024.
- Jaish al Nasr: a militant group splintered from Jundallah in 2010 following Abdul Malik Rigi’s execution, later merged with Jaish al Adl in 2016 following the reported assassination of Abdul Rauf Rigi by the IRGC’s Quds Force in Dalbandin.
- Pada Baloch Movement: founded in 2017.
- Mohammadur Rasool Allah Group: an Islamist Baloch militant group founded during the 1970s operation in Balochistan. No recent militant activity had been reported by the group.

== Operations ==
PFF claimed its first attack targeting Iranian security forces near Zahedan, Sistan and Baluchistan Province, on December 10. Haalvsh, a rights group in Sistan & Baluchestan, said that the PFF claimed responsibility in a statement posted overnight. The group said it targeted a convoy of the IRGC’s Imam Hossein battalion, which is part of the Salman Brigade. PFF fighters had killed four IRGC Ground Forces personnel near the Quds Operational Base in the Lar district of Baluchestan. The killed troops were also speculated to be from the Imam Hossein Battalions, a highly trained unit in the Basij paramilitary organization. A spokesman for the PFF said the attack was meant as retaliation for the role of security forces in suppressing residents in Sistan-Baluchestan. He added that the vehicle carrying the unit’s commander was struck and also that four security personnel were killed and several others wounded. Iranian state media initially reported three dead and three wounded but later stated that the number of security forces killed had increased to four. The human rights group Haalvsh said that local sources reported gunfire occurring as multiple IRGC vehicles were heading toward their base in the Lar area.

=== 2025–2026 Iranian protests ===
The PFF originally announced its support for the nationwide protests in Iran, but that they would not participate within the protests.

On 7 January 2026, PFF militants killed Mahmoud Haqiqat, the police chief of Iranshahr.

On 11 January 2026, PFF fighters killed one Law Enforcement Command officer and injured another in an attack on an LEC patrol vehicle in Dashtiari County, Sistan and Balochistan province.

=== 2026 Iran war ===
During the war on Iran waged by the United States and Israel, the PFF vowed that it will subject Iran to further conflicts itself. On 23 April, the Iranian news agency Tasnim reported that Iranian forces raided a PFF operational cell, killing several militants who allegedly infiltrated the Pakistani border to Iran. On 7 June, Iranian military forces launched an operation againsts PFF militants using ground forces and drone strikes, resulting in the deaths of 4 PFF fighters and one IRGC soldier (namely Mohammad Siahani).

== See also ==
- Baloch Raaji Aajoi Sangar – a united front of Baloch militant groups founded in 2018 aimed at the creation of a sovereign Balochistan
- Coalition of Political Forces of Iranian Kurdistan – a Kurdish nationalist alliance in Iranian Kurdistan that was formed in 2026.
- Coordinating Council of Ahwazi Organizations – an Ahwazi Arab alliance that was formed in 2026.
