= Sistan and Balochistan clashes (2026–present) =

2026 armed clashes in Iran

- Part of the Insurgency in Sistan and Balochistan and the 2026 Iran war
- Map of Iran with Sistan and Baluchestan province highlighted
Date	7 June 2026 – present (4 months, 3 weeks and 4 days)
Location	Sistan and Baluchestan province, Iran
Status	Ongoing

Belligerents
Iran; Liwa Fatemiyoun	People's Fighters Front

Units involved
Islamic Republic of Iran Army; Islamic Revolutionary Guard Corps; Police Command; Ministry of Intelligence	Jaysh al-Adl

Casualties and losses
Per Iran: 6 killed Per PFF: 10 killed	Per PFF: 12 killed Per Iran: 11 killed

Beginning in June 2026, armed clashes erupted between the People's Fighters Front (PFF) and Iranian security and military groups at populated settings in Iran's southeastern Sistan and Baluchestan province. The PFF was previously formed from a merger of several Iranian Balochi separatist groups like the Jaysh al-Adl on 10 December 2025 and later vowed to escalate against Iran during the 2026 Iran war.

The Islamic Revolutionary Guard Corps (IRGC) launched ground and drone attacks on PFF fighters at Saravan on 7 June 2026, resulting in the deaths of four separatist militants and one IRGC fighter. The conflict between Iran and the PFF intensified in scale in September with multiple clashes reported within the Sistan and Balochistan province. From 12 to 13 September 2026, Iranian security forces and People's Fighters Front engaged in a series of armed confrontations in Saravan resulting in casualties on both sides. On 14 September, Sunni Baloch cleric Molavi Yousef Gorgij was assassinated by assailants at Zahedan in what Iran alleged were PFF militants. Iran retaliated against PFF militants with armed clashes at Zahedan on 17 September, with multiple Iranian security personnel and PFF fighters being reported killed. The clashes are part of a long-running pattern of violence in the province involving Iranian security forces and militant groups, including the PFF.

== Background ==
Sistan and Baluchestan, a predominantly Sunni and Baloch province bordering Pakistan, has experienced recurring clashes between Iranian security forces and armed groups, most prominently Jaysh al-Adl, a militant organisation designated as a terrorist group by Iran and several Western countries that says it seeks greater rights for the Baloch minority. Saravan in particular has repeatedly been the site of gun battles between Iranian forces and militants in preceding years. As part of the 2026 Iran war, the People's Fighters Front, which was formed from the merging of Iranian Baloch separatist groups like Jaysh al-Adl on 10 December 2025, vowed to escalate conflict against Iran. The People's Fighters Front coalition was formed with the intent to communicate broader resistance against the Iranian government rather than purely narrow separatist aims. US strikes on security and military infrastructure in Sistan and Balochistan had allowed for the PFF to revamp its strategies to target Iranian personnel. Iran had repeatedly claimed to have dismantled PFF cells from militants crossing over from Pakistan in April and August of 2026 with multiple alleged separatist casualties. It also had a history of accusing the United States, Israel, and Saudi Arabia of backing the militants but has provided no direct evidence.

== Timeline ==
=== June ===
On 7 June, the Islamic Revolutionary Guard Corps (IRGC) reported that it had killed four militants in Saravan but lost one soldier in the process. It claimed that it seized weaponry and Starlink satellite terminals. The People's Fighters Front later confirmed in July that four of its members were killed in the clashes, which involved ground fighting and drones from the IRGC.

=== September ===
Four members of Liwa Fatemiyoun, an IRGC-affiliated Shia Afghan Hazara militia, were reported killed by gunmen at the Rudmahi area of Saravan, their vehicle being set on vehicle per the local rights group Haalvsh. According to Haalvsh, heavy gunfire broke out at around 4:00 a.m. local time on 12 September 2026 in the Bakhshan area of Saravan after dozens of Iranian military and security personnel entered the area. Haalvsh said the clashes were continuing and described the fighting as intense, and reported no immediate confirmed information on the identity of the gunmen, the cause of the fighting, or casualties. Reportedly, hundreds of police, intelligence, and IRGC forces combatted the PFF fighters at rural neighborhoods, also deploying drones and rpgs.

Ali Khalilabadi, deputy governor of Sistan and Baluchestan province, said an operation had been under way since 4:00 a.m. local time to seize the location of an "anti-security" group based in the city of Saravan, whose members he said had gathered there intending "to disrupt public order and carry out terrorist attacks". Khalilabadi said that, according to available information, a large number of the group's members had been killed or wounded in the clashes, and that the operation was continuing in order to fully clear the location. He added that the situation was under control due to the vigilance of the province's security agencies.

According to Iran International, sustained gunfire was exchanged near several military outposts at Bakhshan on 13 September. Both the PFF and IRGC confirmed that the previous round of exchanges resulted in the deaths of 4 PFF fighters; the PFF claimed that 9 IRGC soldiers were killed while the IRGC suggested 3 were deceased. The cause of the gunfire was unclear, and security forces remained in the area, blocking roads to the sites of conflict.

Sunni Baloch cleric Molavi Yousef Gorgij was assassinated by unknown assailants on 14 September at Zahedan. Iran alleged that PFF fighters killed the cleric and accused them of operating as "Zionist mercenaries". Gorgij's death marked the second Iranian cleric killing in a week since the assassination of Mamosta Mohammad Nezhati at West Azerbaijan on 9 September. The IRGC vowed to retaliate against the PFF for Gorgij's death. On 17 September, Iranian personnel engaged in armed clashes at Zahedan against what Iran alleged were PFF militants. Human rights organization Haalvsh reported that multiple Iranian security personnel were killed or injured. IRGC-affiliated outlet Saberin News claimed that three Balochi separatists were killed during the Zahedan clashes.

On 23 September, the Iranian military and gunmen fought at the town of Jihadabad at about 1 PM local time according to local sources that Haalvsh reported on. Iran's semi-official Tasnim News Agency suggested that three Balochi fighters were killed during the operation. Sistan and Balochistan's deputy governor Ali Khalilabadi confirmed that the confrontation of militants at his province by security and law enforcement agencies was a key priority. Tasnim later confirmed that senior IRGC commander Hossein Zarifi and IRGC base intelligence chief Ahmad Herati Zeraati were both killed during the latest round of the clashes while also stating that at least 13 other security force members were wounded and four "enemy's mercenary terrorists" were killed. Haalvsh mentioned that the People's Fighters Front was involved in the clashes and reported that hundreds of Iranian security personnel surrounded the Razi Hospital and blocked roads leading to it but allowed ambulances to pass by. The fighting extended to 24 September with reports of heavy gunfire and military drones at the Jihadabad area. A later report said that five Iranian personnel were killed in the latest clash round. The PFF claimed responsibility for the incident, admitting that four of its militants were killed but also claiming that dozens of Iranian personnel were killed while many others were injured.

Iranian armed forces and PFF militants attacked each other at the Gharibabad area in the city of Iranshahr on 29 September, the clashes lasting for about two hours. Tanks and other military vehicles were deployed by Iranian forces and gunfire and RPG explosions were both heard at the scene. The IRGC had newly employed Mil Mi-28 attack helicopters to perform nighttime military operations against PFF militants for the first time in the Iran-PFF conflict.

On 30 September, a police officer was killed at a security checkpoint in Rask by armed individuals.

=== October ===
On 1 October beginning at 6:00 AM local time, the IRGC and Balochi militants engaged in battle against each other in residential areas of Zahedan. Tasnim said that six separatists were killed during the event. The next day on 2 October, gunmen attacked an intelligence center in the city of Nukabad at Central District of Taftan County. Hours later, security forces raided the villages of Bidlad and Shushgim in Rask County, reportedly killing gunmen in a building and then destroying it from an explosion. The IRGC said that two militants were killed while the rest fled the scene and claimed to have dismantled the cell that assassinated Basij commander Abdolraouf Eshaqi and attacked a security checkpoint at Rask County the previous month. Five members of Liwa Fatemiyoun were killed by an explosive device near their vehicle in the Rudmahi area at Saravan and subsequent raid by gunmen according to Haalvsh. The IRGC contradicted the report and claimed that only one of its members died there. The PFF admitted responsibility for killing the Hazara Afghan Shiite militants, accusing them of serving as mercenaries for the Iranian government.

On 7 October, gunmen at the Lakhshak area in Zahedan attacked a police commando vehicle, resulting in the death of one police officer and several injuries from the armed attackers. The PFF later claimed responsibility for the attack, saying that they managed to hit six security personnel in total. On 9 October, Haalvsh confirmed that more than a dozen Iranian military and security personnel were killed in four different areas of the Sistan and Balochistan province from 7 to 8 October. The PFF admitted responsibility for the attacks in Nik Shahr, Nusratabad, and Jalaq, explaining that they managed to raid an Iranian security headquarters. The same day, senior police official Nosrat Eftekhari, who managed cultural and social affairs, was killed near Zahedan by a roadside bomb. On 12 October, armed gunmen attacked a police station located at the district of Parud in Rask county, with no immediate reports of casualties.

On 13 October, the IRGC's Quds force claimed to have killed five members of an alleged kidnapping cell and lost one of its own members while rescuing a hostage near Zahedan. The same day, Haalvsh reported that more than 20 members of Fatemiyoun were killed or wounded in more than seven hours of clashes at the "mountainous Chah Ahmad and Arzan Tak areas of Taftan County". Eyewitnesses purported that gunmen took up positions and attacked the motorcycle-riding Fatemiyoun members, with more than 40 vehicles as well as reconnaissance and combat drones later arriving as reinforcements for the latter. Among the Iran-affiliated forces killed was IRGC officer Yaser Bagheri. Afsaneh Aqila, a female Basij commander of an all-women's unit and a police officer, were both killed at Zabol County by unidentified gunmen in separate attacks on 14 October.

== See also ==
- 2024 Chabahar and Rask clashes
- 2024 Gowhar Kuh attack
- Western Iran clashes (2026–present)
