= Coordinating Council of Ahwazi Organizations =

Alliance of Ahwazi Arab political groups formed in 2026

Flag used by the CCAO and other Arab separatists in Khuzestan

The Coordinating Council of Ahwazi Organizations (CCAO; Arabic: الهيئة التنسيقية للتنظيمات الأحوازية) is an alliance of several Ahwazi Arab political groups formed in 2026 amid the nationwide Iranian protests and the rise of separatist activities in Iran during the 2026 Iran war.

== History ==
In February 2026, amid the Iranian protests, five Ahwazi Arab political organizations issued a joint statement announcing the establishment of the Coordinating Council of Ahwazi Organizations (CCAO). In March 2026, the CCAO hosted a conference in the city of London, with the slogan "Ahwazi First". The conference emphasized the need to respond to Ahwazi Arab demands amid the war and the right to self-determination. At the London conference in March, three additional organizations joined the alliance, bringing its size to eight organizations. The eight organizations of the CCAO included the Ahwazi Assembly, the Arab Struggle Movement for the Liberation of Ahwaz, the Arab Democratic National Current in Ahwaz, the Ahwaz Democratic Front, the Ahwazi Popular Democratic Front, the Arab Front for the Liberation of Ahwaz, the Ahwazi Arab Struggle Movement, and the Democratic Solidarity Party. The CCAO was formed around the time that Kurdish and Azeri groups began forming their own alliances. Swedish authorities had also foiled an assassination attempt on Saeed Humaydan, the leader of the Ahwazi Arab Struggle Movement, who was based in Sweden, only a few days before he headed to London for the CCAO conference in March 2026.

On February 28, as the US-Israeli strikes intensified and killed Ali Khamenei, the CCAO released a statement emphasizing Ahwazi unity in pursuit of "legitimate rights" and self-determination, asserting that the "non-Persian peoples were forcibly annexed into Iran’s political geography". Ali Kazem al-Ahwazi, a member of the CCAO executive body, claimed that the CCAO was preparing a "large-scale operation for the future" and sought to exploit the US-Israeli strikes in Khuzestan province, but stressed that they were "waiting for the right opportunity" to avoid a harsh Iranian response before they enter Khuzestan and seize "all government centers to regain our state and our stolen right." He also claimed to have contacts with various groups in the Iranian opposition. Hassan Radi, director of the Ahwaz Center for Media and Strategic Studies, claimed that they were also coordinating with Baloch, Kurdish, and Azeri groups, both politically and on the field.

== See also ==
- People's Fighters Front
- Coalition of Political Forces of Iranian Kurdistan
