= Western Iran clashes (2026–present) =

Clashes between Kurdish insurgents and the Iranian Armed Forces

- Part of the Kurdish–Iranian crisis during the 2026 Iran war
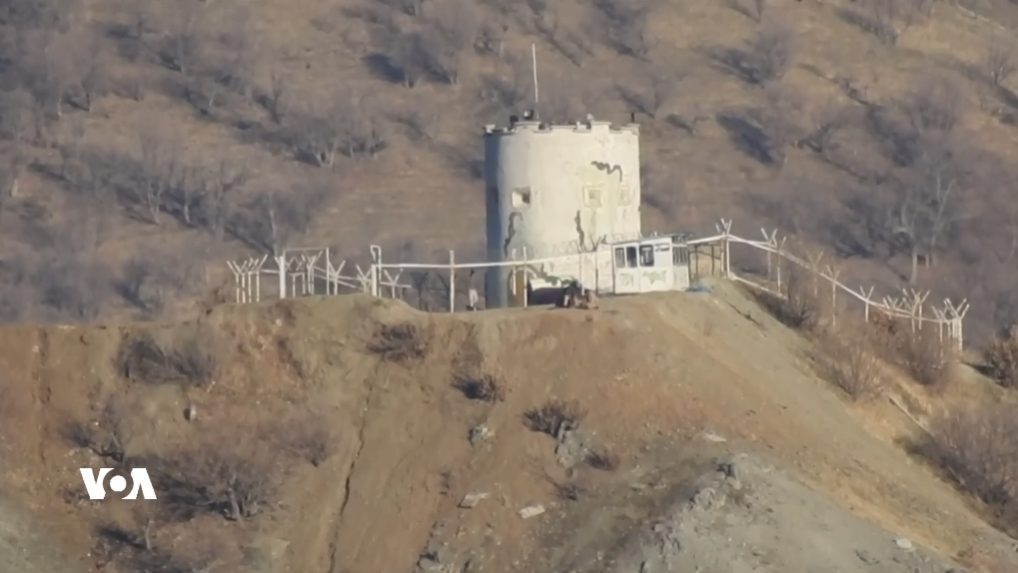
- Iranian border guard outpost along the Iran–Iraq (Kurdistan Region) border, June 2026.
Date	7 June 2026 – present (4 months, 1 week and 6 days)
Location	Iran (Iranian Kurdistan): Kurdistan Province; Kermanshah Province; West Azerbaijan Province; Kurdistan Region in Iraq
Status	Ongoing

Belligerents
Coalition of Political Forces of Iranian Kurdistan (Kurdistan Region) Sun of Hope	Iran

Units involved
Coalition of Political Forces of Iranian Kurdistan; Democratic Party of Iranian Kurdistan; PDKI Peshmerga; Kurdistan Free Life Party; Eastern Kurdistan Units (YRK); Kurdistan Patriotic Youth; Kurdistan Martyrs' Revenge Teams	Iranian Armed Forces; Islamic Republic of Iran Army; Islamic Revolutionary Guard Corps (IRGC); Basij; Police Command; Border Guard Command; Ministry of Intelligence; Muslim Peshmerga

Casualties and losses
per Kurdish: 9 killed	per Iran: 1 killed per Kurdish: 21 killed, 4 injured

Beginning in early June 2026, armed clashes erupted between the Kurdistan Free Life Party's (PJAK) armed wing, the Eastern Kurdistan Units (YRK), and the Islamic Revolutionary Guard Corps (IRGC) in the highlands of western Iran (Iranian Kurdistan), particularly near Marivan and regions south of Mahabad. In late June and early July 2026, clashes intensified and spread to the Iran–Iraq border, the Sardasht–Baneh–Saqqez triangle, urban areas, and began to involve other Iranian Kurdish opposition groups, including the Democratic Party of Iranian Kurdistan (KDPI).

Besides the armed clashes, ACLED recorded a significant increase in assassinations of IRGC affiliates and countermeasures by the Basij, including the expansion of its "popular intelligence network." The assassinations have been attributed to PJAK-linked groups such as the Patriotic Youth of Kurdistan and Kurdistan Martyrs' Revenge Teams, as well as newly emerging groups such as Sun of Hope (Khori Hiwa).

== Background ==
During the Iranian–Kurdish conflict, the Iranian Kurdish opposition's last major ground confrontation with Iran occurred during the 2016–2023 clashes. As a result of the 2026 Iran war, the IRGC targeted Iranian Kurdish opposition parties in the Kurdistan Region of Iraq (KRI) through aerial attacks, reportedly in anticipation of a potential U.S.-backed Kurdish offensive. However, Kurdish groups remained relatively passive, citing the lack of long-term U.S. war objectives. Reports of alleged leaks concerning U.S. and Israeli offensive plans and weapons supplies, combined with pressure from Turkey, Iraq, and the Kurdistan Regional Government (KRG), followed by the withdrawal of U.S. support, effectively closed the window of opportunity. Meanwhile, Iran reinforced its border regions along the KRI, pressured Iraq to expel Kurdish groups, and reactivated elements of the Muslim Peshmerga.

Although hostilities between Iran, the U.S., and Israel had largely ceased following the Islamabad Memorandum in mid-June, Iranian strikes on Kurdish opposition groups in the KRI continued, and fighting soon erupted between the IRGC and Kurdish armed groups. The clashes included sustained ground fighting inside Iranian Kurdistan. Hengaw reported that the clashes spread to multiple cities in Iranian Kurdistan, while Fox News indicated that the clashes could lead to the renewing of a larger Kurdish insurgency.

PJAK stated that the renewed clashes were a consequence of the memorandum between the United States and Iran, and that Iran escalated the situation thereafter. The killing of two prominent Yarsani-Kurdish cultural activists also sparked outrage in the region, prompting a PJAK spokesperson to state that "when the regime speaks to the Kurdish people through executions, assassinations, and massacres, the Kurds will answer with legitimate self-defense."

== Timeline ==
=== June ===
Clashes reportedly began on 7 June when pro-PKK ANF News claimed that the armed wing of PJAK, the Eastern Kurdistan Units (YRK), was targeted by artillery fire of the IRGC and repelled an attack in Marivan. According to ANF News, IRGC bombardments, including drone strikes, on areas near Marivan and Baneh continued on 16 June and 25 June. On 20 June, Iran's Armed Forces General Staff (AFGS) confirmed the clashes and stated that it was closely monitoring militant activity in the provinces of Kurdistan, West Azerbaijan, and Kermanshah, and that it had adopted an "active deterrence" doctrine. On 23 June, clashes in the Khawmirabad area along the Iran–Iraq border resulted in the death of an Iranian border officer at the hands of unidentified armed individuals. On 26 June, an attack on the Saqqez–Baneh road at the entrance to Baneh, which may have been related to the clashes, killed between two and three Iranian police officers and injured between two and five others, according to differing reports. The Sardasht–Baneh–Saqqez triangle experienced increasing Iranian military deployments and shelling of the surrounding mountain areas. On 29 June, the YRK described ongoing clashes between its forces and the IRGC as "military operations" launched by the latter, which it said had escalated in the area of Mahabad, particularly the village of Gagesh. The Amargi also described the clashes as a military operation backed by significant firepower. At the end of June, Hengaw reported that the clashes had resulted in the deaths of four YRK fighters and three IRGC members, as well as the injury of four Iranian security personnel and one civilian. The deaths of the four YRK fighters were also confirmed by the group itself, while PJAK-aligned media claimed that 16 IRGC members were killed, three Iranian drones were destroyed, and an IRGC depot was struck by a first-person-view (FPV) drone. Iranian authorities acknowledged at least one death among its border guards.

On 29 June, the newly formed Kurdish militant group Sun of Hope (Xori Hiwa) carried out an attack on the residence of a local Kurdish Basij member in Paveh. The attack reportedly resulted in the deaths of two Basij members and injury of two more. Following the attack, Sun of Hope announced its formation and stated that its main goals were to "promote political awareness, strengthen Kurdish national identity, and confront the policies of the Islamic Republic of Iran." The group had also reported clashes between its fighters and the IRGC in Piranshahr. An attack in Paveh on the same day was also claimed by the PJAK-linked Kurdistan Patriotic Youth.

=== July ===
On 1 July and in the early hours of 2 July, heavy clashes erupted between KDPI Peshmerga and the IRGC in the village of Qazqapan, approximately 3 kilometres west of Piranshahr, near the Iraqi border. The KDPI confirmed five deaths among its forces, while Iranian state-linked media claimed between six and eleven were killed among the group. On the same day, Iraq reported a drone strike on an Iranian Kurdish militant base east of Erbil, Kurdistan Region.

On 7 July, RojNews, citing regional sources, reported that Iran had intensified troop deployments along the Iran–Iraq border following the clashes in June. The following day, the state-affiliated Iranian Students' News Agency reported that one IRGC member had been killed in clashes with what it described as "terrorist groups" in the Sardasht region.

On 15 July, IranWire reported that Iran had deployed 3,000 personnel from the Saberin Takavar Brigade to the western border region, units of the IRGC Ground Force and Aerospace Force, alongside tanks, artillery, Katyusha rocket launchers, and large numbers of reconnaissance and kamikaze drones, significantly increasing its military presence in the region.

By 19 July, Iranian authorities had closed civilian access to the Iran–Iraq border with the Kurdistan Region. Around the same time, Hengaw reported that the IRGC had held a large-scale military meeting at its headquarters in the town of Ravansar. The meeting was attended by Kourosh Asiabani, commander of the IRGC's regional headquarters in western Iran, along with other IRGC personnel, Basij forces, and armed local auxiliaries commonly known as jash.

On July 25, 2026, Sun of Hope said it assassinated a high-ranking intelligence official in Piranshahr. Hengaw confirmed that the attack had occurred at the IRGC's 124th Ramadan Base and reported that another IRGC member had been seriously injured.

On 27 July, the semi-official Mehr News Agency cited the spokesperson for the Iranian Police Command as saying that four PJAK members had been killed "in an armed clash" with Iranian forces after they had "attempted to enter the country." Hengaw, however, disputed the official account, reporting that the incident was an IRGC ambush targeting Kurdish artist and cultural activist Mehdi Tavakkoli and his family while they were travelling on the Marivan–Baneh road. According to the human rights organization, Iranian police subsequently claimed that Tavakkoli was affiliated with PJAK and pressured his family to describe the incident as a traffic accident.

On 30 July, an IRGC-affiliated local auxiliary was killed in Baneh in an attack by unidentified gunmen.

=== August ===
On 2 August, clashes between an unidentified armed group, presumed to be PJAK, and the Iranian Army's 328th Marivan Brigade at its base in Sianav left one Iranian soldier dead and another wounded. The attack reportedly involved loitering munitions and RPG fire targeting the base.

On 6 August, Hengaw reported that a veteran IRGC-affiliated local auxiliary had been killed in an attack on his family home. The attack was attributed to PJAK, although no group claimed responsibility. The same day, the Sun of Hope organization claimed that its fighters had clashed with Iranian government forces in West Azerbaijan province over the previous 24 hours, alleging that they had inflicted casualties.

On 8 August, two separate clashes in Gagesh, south of Mahabad, and Sanandaj resulted in the deaths of two IRGC members. The Sun of Hope organization was reportedly involved in both incidents.

=== September ===
On 8 September, an armed attack killed Eslam Kak Darvishi, who had served as an IRGC commander in Marivan, Baneh and Piranshahr in previous years, in Piranshahr. On 13 September, a motorcycle drive-by shooting targeted a Basij member and cleric affiliated with the IRGC in Piranshahr county, killing him. Sun of Hope claimed responsibility for both attacks, while the IRGC Provincial Corps in Urmia confirmed the death of the Basij member and cleric and attributed the attack to Kurdish opposition parties.

On 28 September, PJAK-aligned media claimed that the Kurdistan Martyrs' Revenge Teams killed Haidar Moradi, an active Basij member and Kurdish IRGC collaborator, in an assassination in the town of Kamyaran.

=== October ===
On 16 and 18 October, the IRGC conducted artillery shelling and suicide drone attacks, against forested mountainous areas of Sanandaj County, the Shaho Mountains, and Marivan County, according to the Kurdistan Human Rights Network (KHRN). The attacks caused extensive wildfires.

== Regional spillover ==
In early August, the Iranian Army claimed that the 23rd Airborne Special Forces Brigade had carried out 14 cross-border raids into the Kurdistan Region of Iraq, killing several "anti-revolutionary elements." Neither the Iraqi government nor the Kurdistan Regional Government confirmed that the incursions had taken place and the reports remained unconfirmed.

== Reactions ==
=== Non-state actors ===
Kurdistan Workers' Party (PKK): In light of the clashes in late June, PKK commander Murat Karayılan called on the Iranian government to pursue diplomacy rather than military action, stating that "a war [...] between the Kurds and the Iranian state [...] will not serve any side."

== See also ==
- Sistan and Balochistan clashes (2026–present)
