= Sun of Hope =

Kurdish militant group

- خۆری هیوا
- Logo of the group
- Founded: 2026
- Country: Iran
- Active regions: Iranian Kurdistan
- Conflicts: 2026 Iran war; Western Iran clashes (2026–present)

Sun of Hope (Kurdish: خۆری هیوا, romanized: Xorî Hîwa) is a Kurdish militant group in Iran formed in mid-2026. It has claimed responsibility for armed attacks against the Islamic Revolutionary Guard Corps. The group described itself as an organisation opposing "oppression, occupation, and the policies of the Islamic Republic". The group operates in the Iranian Kurdistan.

== History ==
Sun of Hope emerged in 2026 during clashes in Kurdish regions of Iran between Kurdish rebel groups in the government. In a series of Instagram posts, the group described itself as an organisation opposing "oppression, occupation, and the policies of the Islamic Republic" and a "voice of truth" that would spread information about Kurdish activities and document alleged oppression by the Iranian government. Sun of Hope has not claimed any ties to the Kurdish opposition groups, but has expressed support for the Kurdistan Free Life Party in one of its statements.

Al-Monitor reported that the group is active in Iranian Kurdistan. The Jerusalem Post speculated that new militant groups like Sun of Hope are likely splinter groups of existing organizations. Sun of Hope has not disclosed information about its leadership or goals, and little is known about the group.

== Attacks ==
On June 29, 2026, two members of the Islamic Revolutionary Guard Corps in Paveh were shot dead in their homes by armed men on motorcycles. Sun of Hope took responsibility for the attack. The group said the attack was carried out in retaliation for the Iranian government's crackdown on the Mahsa Amini protests in 2022. The group accused one of the IRGC members it had targeted of being involved in the crackdown. Sun of Hope later claimed to have engaged in a gun fight with the IRGC in Piranshahr.

On July 25, 2026, the group announced the assassination of a high-ranking intelligence official in Piranshahr in retaliation for his alleged involvement in military operations against Kurdish groups. During the attack, the group's gunmen opened fire on a car carrying two IRGC officials stationed at 124th Ramadan Base, killing one and seriously injuring another. The group posted video of the attack on Instagram.

On August 5, 2026, Sun of Hope claimed responsibility for killing an IRGC member in Gagesh-e Sofla, acccusing him of "harassing residents". On August 8, the group claimed responsibility for a fatal shooting outside the home of the IRGC member in Sanandaj. The group accused the victim of being involved in "repression, arrest, and torture" of Woman, Life, Freedom protesters.
