= 2024 Chabahar and Rask clashes =

Battle between Jaish ul-Adl and Iranian security forces

Chabahar and Rask clashes
- Part of the Sistan and Baluchestan insurgency
Date	4 April 2024
Location	Chabahar, Rask and Sarbaz, Sistan and Baluchestan, Iran
Result	Jaish al-Adl fails to seize IRGC headquarters

Belligerents
Iran; Islamic Republic of Iran Army; Islamic Republic of Iran Navy; Islamic Revolutionary Guard Corps	Jaish ul-Adl

Casualties and losses
16 killed	18 killed

In the southeastern border province of Sistan and Balochistan, an attack on an Islamic Revolutionary Guard Corps (IRGC) headquarters happened on the night of 4 April 2024. At least 16 Iranian security force members were killed in this attack. The clashes occurred in the towns of Chabahar, Rask and Sarbaz. Jaish ul-Adl, a Sunni armed group, was involved in the attack and lost at least 16 members during the clashes. This incident is one of the deadliest attacks carried out by Jaish ul-Adl. The region has a predominantly Sunni Muslim population and has witnessed frequent clashes between Iranian security forces and militants. The attack took place following an Israeli missile strike on the Iranian consulate in Damascus, Syria that killed Quds Force Brigadier-General Mohammad Reza Zahedi and his deputy, General Mohammad Hadi Hajriahimi.

Jaish al-Adl in a statement announced that the purpose of this attack was to counter the Iranian government's plan titled "Makran Coastal Development Plan", which through that, the IRI government is building planned settlements on the coast of Baluchistan and plans to move 7 million Shia people from the Fatemiyoun and Zainbiyoun groups to this area and settle them.

== Background ==
The area, bordering Afghanistan and Pakistan, has witnessed frequent clashes between Iranian security forces and militants as well as drug traffickers. Over the past decade, Jaish ul-Adl, a Baluchi separatist militant group, has consistently focused its attacks on the Revolutionary Guards in western Balochistan. However, since the "Bloody Friday" incident in Zahedan, these assaults have escalated significantly, resulting in large-scale and lethal strikes against Iranian forces. Jaish ul-Adl was one of they terrorist groups that got ahold of weapons left behind after the U.S. withdrawal from Afghanistan. The attack came after an Iranian airstrike targeted Jaish ul-Adl operatives, including senior commander Ismail Shahbakhsh, within Pakistani territory. Jaish ul-Adl has launched attacks against Iranian security forces, with a notable incident in December that killed 11 police personnel. The group cites the pursuit of greater rights and improved living conditions for ethnic minority Baluchis in Shi'ite-dominated Iran as their rationale for the attacks. Sistan and Balochistan, one of Iran’s most underdeveloped provinces, houses a discontented local population as a result of government policies. Baluchis, many of whom are Sunni, have faced disproportionate discrimination for a long time. Additionally, they make up about 5% of Iran's population, but account for around 20% of all executions in Iran.

The government of Iran is confronting a multitude of challenges: severe international economic sanctions, direct targeting of its interests by Israel in Syria, and ISIS attacks within its borders. Amidst the ongoing turmoil, the insurgency in Sistan and Balochistan has seized the opportunity to apply additional pressure on the struggling government.

== Attacks ==
On the night of 4 April 2024, the Jaish al-Adl militant group carried out an unprecedentedly complex and sophisticated attack targeting Iranian security forces in southeastern Iran. Coordinated and simultaneous assaults struck at least two Islamic Revolutionary Guards Corps (IRGC) headquarters, a police station, and a naval facility in Chabahar, Rask and Sarbaz within Iran's Sistan and Balochistan Province. The attacks, which began around midnight and lasted over 13 hours, resulted in the deaths of 16 Iranian security personnel and 18 Jaish al-Adl militants. The gunmen stormed various security and military compounds, wearing suicide vests, but failed to seize the Guards headquarters. This attack occurred amidst heightened tensions following a suspected Israeli missile strike that hit Iran's consulate in Damascus, for which Iran pledged revenge. The IRGC commander stated that the security forces had freed the people taken hostage by the terrorists.

== Aftermath ==
Iran mobilized its forces to deal with Jaish al-Adl’s attacks at multiple locations.

== Reactions ==
=== International ===
The United Nations Security Council issued a statement condemning the attack. The Council expressed sympathy and condolences to the victims’ families and the government of Iran. It reaffirmed that terrorism poses a serious threat to international peace and security, emphasizing the need to hold perpetrators accountable and bring them to justice.

Pakistan had also condemned the attack. "Pakistan openly condemns the despicable and cowardly attack on security and police headquarters in the cities of Rask and Chabahar," stated an official Pakistani government release.
