= Chabahar suicide bombing =

Chabahar suicide bombing refers to:

- 2010 Chabahar suicide bombing
- 2018 Chabahar suicide bombing
