= Mohammad Faisal (disambiguation) =

Mohammad or Muhammad Faisal may refer to:

- Muhammad Faisal, Iraqi refugee
- Mohammad Faisal, Pakistani diplomat
- Muhamad Faisal Manap, Singaporean politician
- Muhammad Faishal Ibrahim, Singaporean politician

== See also ==
- Mohamed Faisal (disambiguation)
