= Shia–Sunni relations =

Relations between the two largest Islamic sects

The succession to Muhammad in 632 led the Muslims to be split into two camps: the Sunnis, who believed that the caliphs of the Islamic community should be chosen by a council, as in Saqifa; and a second group, the Shia, who believed that Muhammad had named his successor to be Ali ibn Abi Talib, his cousin and son-in-law.

Today there are differences in religious practice and jurisprudence, traditions, and customs between Shia and Sunni Muslims. Although all Muslim groups consider the Quran to be divine, Sunni and Shia have different opinions on interpretations (hadith) of the Quran.

In recent years, the relations between the Shias and the Sunnis have been increasingly marked by conflict. The aftermath of the 1979 Iranian Revolution, which reconfigured Iran into a theocratic Islamic republic governed by high-ranking Shia clerics, had far-reaching consequences across the Muslim world. The Iraq War of 2003–2011 further influenced regional power dynamics, solidifying Shias as the predominant force in Iraq. Iran's ascent as a regional power in the Middle East, along with shifts in politics and demographics in Lebanon favouring Shia, has heightened Sunni concerns about their Sunni–Arab hegemony. Recent years have witnessed the Iran–Saudi Arabia proxy conflict, as well as sectarian violence from Pakistan to Yemen, which became a major element of friction throughout the Middle East and South Asia. Tensions between communities have intensified during power struggles, such as the Shia led Bahraini uprising, the Iraqi civil war, the 2013–2017 war in Iraq against ISIS, as well as the Sunni led Syrian civil war. The self-styled Islamic State of Iraq and Syria (ISIS) launched a persecution of Shias.

While the exact numbers are subject to debate, the Shia comprise around 15% of the world's Muslims, and Sunnis 85%. Sunnis are a majority in most Muslim communities around the world. Shia make up the majority of the citizen population in Iran, Iraq and Azerbaijan, and are present as a minority in Bahrain, Lebanon, Saudi Arabia, Syria, Yemen, Nigeria, Afghanistan, India, Pakistan, Chad, Turkey, and Kuwait.

== Demographics ==
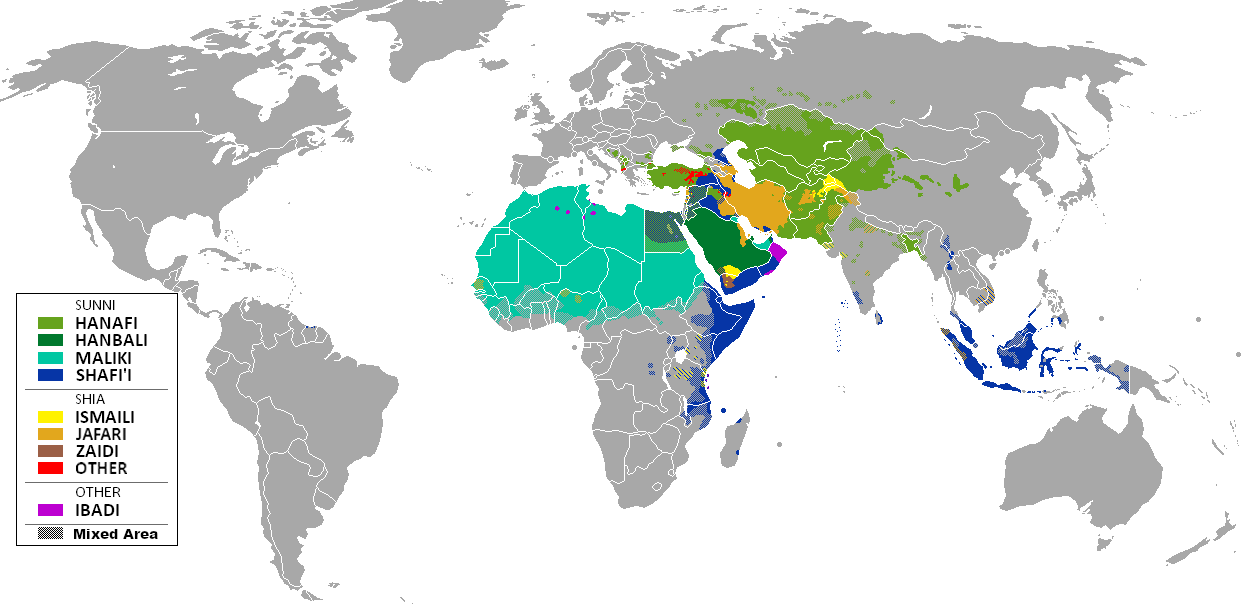
Distribution of Sunni, Shia and Ibadi branches

Sunni Muslims are the vast majority of Muslims in most Muslim communities in Central Asia (including China). Within Shia Islam about 85% are Twelver, and within Twelver Shia, the overwhelming majority follow the Usuli school of jurisprudence. In Iran, an officially Shia country since 1501, around 90–95% of Muslims are Shia. 65–85% of Muslims in Azerbaijan are Shia. Shia, mostly of the Zaydi sect, form a large minority (45%) of the population in Yemen. About 10–20% of Turkey's population belong to the Alevi sect of Shi'i Islam. The Shia constitute around 25–30% of Kuwaiti citizens, 55% of the Muslim population in Bahrain, and 45–55% of Muslims in Lebanon, 10–15% of Saudi Arabia, 10–15% of Syria, and 10–20% of Pakistan. Around 10–20% of Afghanistan, less than 5% of the Muslims in Nigeria, and around 4–5% of population of Tajikistan are Shia. And less than 1% of Indonesia, Bangladesh and Egypt India has as many Shia ("potentially") as there are in Iraq.

Scholar Vali Nasr has said that numbers and percentages of Sunni and Shia populations are not exact because "in much of the Middle East it is not convenient" to have exact numbers, "for ruling regimes in particular".

== Differences in beliefs and practices ==
=== Mahdi ===
The Mahdi is the prophesied redeemer of Islam. While Shia and Sunnis differ on the nature of the Mahdi, many members of both groups believe that the Mahdi will appear at the end of the world to bring about a perfect and just Islamic society.

In Shia Islam, "the Mahdi symbol has developed into a powerful and central religious idea." Twelvers believe the Mahdi will be Muhammad al-Mahdi, the twelfth Imam returned from the occultation, where he has been hidden by Allah since 874. Mainstream Sunnis' beliefs are somewhat different: The Mahdi forms an important component of Sunni eschatology, his appearance being considered the last of the minor signs of the Day of Judgment before its major signs. They believe the Mahdi will be a descendant of Muhammad named Muhammad and will revive the faithful.

=== Hadith ===
The Shia accept some of the same hadiths of Muhammad used by Sunnis as part of the sunnah and the basis of divine law and religious practice. In addition, they consider the sayings of Ahl al-Bayt that are not attributed directly to Muhammad as hadiths. Shia do not accept many Sunni hadiths unless they are also recorded in Shia sources or the methodology of how they were recorded can be proven.

Some Sunni-accepted hadiths—for example by Aisha or Abu Hurairah—are less favored by Shia (Aisha opposed Ali and Abu Hurairah is considered an enemy of Ali and, according to Shia, was only a Muslim for four years of his life before Muhammad's death. Although he accompanied Muhammad for only four years, he managed to record ten times as many hadiths as Abu Bakr and Ali each).

=== Sufism ===
Shiism and Sufism are said to share a number of hallmarks: Belief in an inner meaning to the Quran, special status for some mortals (saints for Sufi, Imams for Shia), as well as veneration of Ali and Muhammad's family.

=== Pillars of faith ===
The Five Pillars of Islam (Arabic: أركان الإسلام) is the term given to the five duties incumbent on every Muslim and are held by both Sunni and Shia. These duties are Shahada (profession of faith), Salat (prayers), Zakāt (giving of alms), Sawm (fasting, specifically during Ramadan) and Hajj (pilgrimage to Mecca). In addition, Shia theology has two concepts that define religion as a whole. These are Roots of Religion (Usūl al-Dīn) and Branches of Religion (Furu al Din).

=== Practices ===
Many distinctions can be made between Sunnis and Shiaīs through observation alone:

==== Salat ====
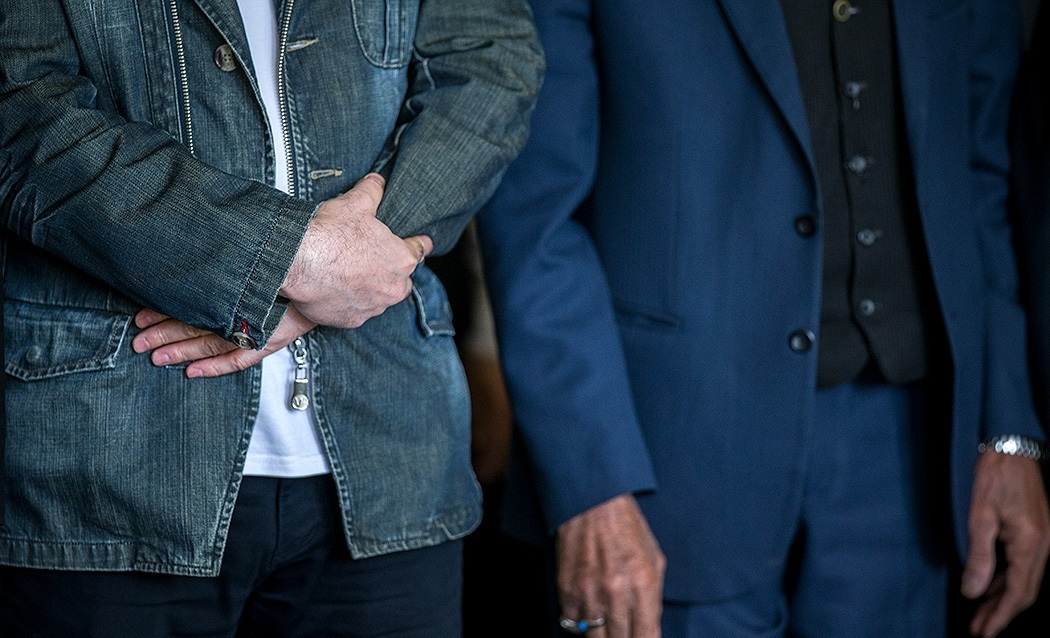
A Sunni Muslim (left) beside a Shia Muslim (right) showing different ways of holding arms during 16 March 2018 Tehran Friday prayer, Iran.

When prostrating during Salah, Shia place their forehead onto a piece of naturally occurring material—most often a clay tablet (mohr) or soil (turbah)—instead of directly onto a prayer rug.

There are five salat prayers at different times of the day, but unlike Sunni, some Shia combine two sets of the prayers, (1+2+2, i.e. fajr on its own, Dhuhr with Asr and Maghrib with Isha') praying five times per day but with a very small break in between the prayer, instead of five prayers with some gap between them as required by Sunni schools of law.

Shia and the followers of the Sunni Maliki school hold their hands at their sides during prayer while Sunnis of other schools cross their arms (right over left) and clasp their hands; it is commonly held by Sunni scholars (especially of the Maliki school) that either is acceptable.

==== Mut'ah and Misyar ====
The Twelver branch of Shia Islam permits Nikah mut'ah—fixed-term temporary marriage. The practice is not allowed within the Sunni community, nor within the Ismaili Shia or the Zaidi Shia, who consider it planned and agreed fornication rather than marriage. These schools believe that mutah was permitted until Umar forbade it during his rule. (Mutah is not the same as misyar marriage or 'arfi marriage, which has no date of expiration and is permitted by some Sunnis. A misyar marriage differs from a conventional Islamic marriage in that the man does not have financial responsibility of the woman by her own free will. The man can divorce the woman whenever he wants to in a misyar marriage.)

==== Hijab and dress ====
Both Sunni and Shia women wear the hijab. Devout women of the Shia traditionally wear black as do some Sunni women in the Persian Gulf. Some Shia religious leaders also wear a black robe. Mainstream Shia and Sunni women wear the hijab differently. Some Sunni scholars emphasize covering of all body including the face in public whereas some scholars exclude the face from hijab. Shia believe that the hijab must cover around the perimeter of the face and up to the chin. Like Sunnis, some Shia women, such as those in Iran and Iraq, use their hand to hold the black chador to cover their faces when in public.

==== Given names ====
Muslims are often named after famous early Muslims, so that given names of Shia are often derived from the names of Ahl al-Bayt. In particular, the names Fatema, Zaynab, Ali, Abbas, Hassan and Hussain are disproportionately common among Shia; while Umar, Uthman, Abu Bakr, Aisha are very common among Sunnis but very rare among Shia.

==== Pilgrimages ====
The pilgrimage to Mecca, known as hajj, is one of the pillars of Islam for both Sunnis and Shi'ites, but Shia have many other holy sites they make pilgrimages (ziyarat) to. Among them are Al-Baqi Cemetery near Medina, Najaf and Karbala, in Iraq, and Qom and Mashhad, in Iran.

== History ==
=== Early and pre-modern history ===
The origin of Shia Islam arose in response to the succession to Muhammad and whether Ali ibn Abi Talib or a more experienced member of the Quraysh tribe should succeed. The concept of Shi'ism further crystallized around events at the Battle of Karbala (680 CE) where Husayn ibn Ali, the son of Ali and grandson of Muhammad, was killed alongside many of his supporters. Thus a political split became a far more personal one, marked by blood feud, and a cause for further divergence.

Even so, by the 13th to 14th century, Sunni and Shia practices remained highly intertwined, and figures today commonly associated with Shia Islam, such as Ali and Jafar al-Sadiq, played an influential role for all Muslims.

==== Abbasid era ====
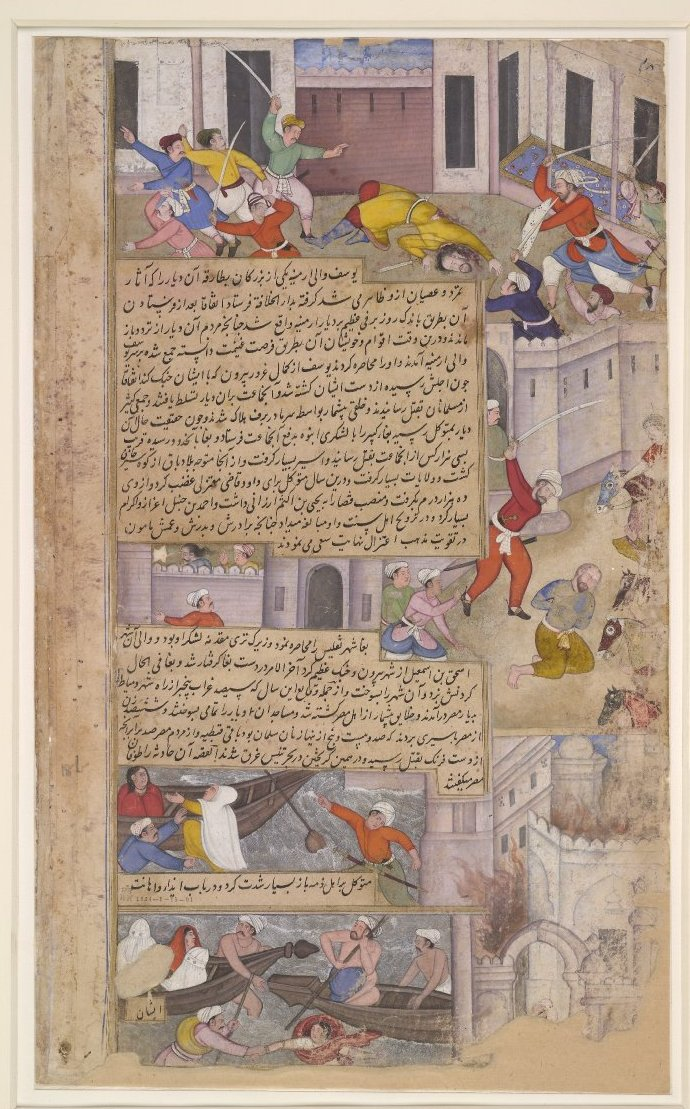
Destruction of the Tomb of Husayn ibn Ali at Karbala, condemned in a Mughal era manuscript.

The Umayyads were overthrown in 750 by a new dynasty, the Abbasids. The first Abbasid caliph, As-Saffah, recruited Shia support in his campaign against the Umayyads by emphasising his blood relationship to Muhammad's household through descent from his uncle, 'Abbas ibn 'Abd al-Muttalib. The Shia also believe that he promised them that the caliphate, or at least religious authority, would be vested in the Shia imam. As-Saffah assumed both the temporal and religious mantle of caliph. He continued the Umayyad dynastic practice of succession, and his brother al-Mansur succeeded him in 754. Ja'far al-Sadiq, the sixth Shia imam, died during al-Mansur's reign, and there were claims that he was murdered on the orders of the caliph. (However, Abbasid persecution of Islamic scholars was not restricted to the Shia. Abū Ḥanīfa, for example, was imprisoned by al-Mansur and tortured.)

Shia sources further claim that by the orders of the tenth Abbasid caliph, al-Mutawakkil, the tomb of the third imam, Hussein ibn Ali in Karbala, was completely demolished, and Shia were sometimes beheaded in groups, buried alive, or even placed alive within the walls of government buildings still under construction. The Shia believe that their community continued to live for the most part in hiding and followed their religious life secretly without external manifestations.

==== Iraq ====
Iraq holds a unique and foundational position in the history of Shia Islam. The roots of the Iraqi Shia community are deep, dating back to the seventh century. Ali ibn Abi Talib, moved the capital of the Rashidun Caliphate from Medina to Kufa in Iraq. Iraqi Shia identity further spread after the Battle of Karbala in 680, where Imam Husayn ibn Ali and his followers were martyred by the Umayyad army. The cities of Najaf, site of Ali's tomb, and Karbala, site of Husayn's shrine, became major pilgrimage sites and centers of Shia learning in Iraq. Six of the Twelve Imams have their tombs located in Iraq.

In the early Islamic period, Iraq served as a primary hub for Shia scholarship and political activity. It was home to many renowned disciples of the Shia Imams and witnessed several uprisings against Umayyad rule, including those led by Sulayman ibn Surad and Mukhtar al-Thaqafi. While the Twelver sect eventually became dominant, other Shia sects like Zaydism among Kurds and Ismailism among the Musha'sha Arabs also had a historical presence in Iraq.

Medieval Iraq saw the rise of several native Shia dynasties that ruled parts of Iraq. In the 10th and 11th centuries, Hamdanid dynasty established an emirate in northern Iraq from their base in Mosul. They were succeeded by other Shia dynasties like the Uqaylids. In central Iraq, the Mazyadids, ruled an autonomous emirate from their capital, Hillah, from 961 to 1160, making it a major center for Shia scholarship.

Early-modern Iraq became a religious battleground between the neighboring Ottoman and Safavid Empires. For the Sunni Ottomans, who subscribed to the Hanafi school of thought, control over Iraq, and particularly Baghdad, the site of Abu Hanifa's shrine, was a major source of religious legitimacy. Conversely, for the Twelver Shia Safavids, sovereignty was fought for primarily due to the presence of the Al-Atabat Al-Aliyat, that is, the holy shrine cities of Najaf, Karbala, Kadhimiya, and Samarra. This rivalry resulted in centuries of conflict, plunging Iraq into a prolonged period of warfare in a religious struggle between the two major Islamic powers.

The Shia majority in Iraq was formed primarily through the mass conversion of Sunni Arab tribes in the 18th and 19th centuries. This process began after the collapse of the Safavid Iran in 1722 which recentered Shia learning back to Iraq, in Najaf and Karbala. The Wahhabi sack of Karbala in 1801 motivated the Shia scholars to convert tribes to secure their cities. A key trigger was the Ottoman policy of tribal settlement after 1831, which forced nomads into agriculture, disrupted their society, and created an identity crisis that made them receptive to conversion. This was aided by the construction of the Hindiyya canal, which drew tribes to settle in the fertile lands around the Shia holy cities, bringing them under the direct influence of Shia scholars.

The Ottoman-Persian rivalry split Iraq's society, as the state legally treated its Shia citizens as potential Persian subjects. Native Iraqi Arab and Kurdish Shias were often categorized as Persian subjects (taba'iyya iraniyya), a classification the Ottoman state used to justify discriminatory policies. These included religious fatwas condemning Shia as heretics and laws, such as those in 1822 and 1874, that prohibited marriage between Ottoman women and Shia men. This framework of viewing the Shia population through a lens of imperial security and sectarian difference continued to influence policies in the modern Iraqi state.

==== Persia ====
Shafi'i Sunnism was the dominant form of Islam in most of Iran until rise of the Safavid Empire although a significant undercurrent of Ismailism and a large minority of Twelvers were present all over Persia. The Sunni hegemony did not undercut the Shia presence in Iran. The writers of the Shia Four Books were Iranian, as were many other scholars. According to Morteza Motahhari:

The majority of Iranians turned to Shi'ism from the Safawid period onwards. Of course, it cannot be denied that Iran's environment was more favourable to the flourishing of the Shi'ism as compared to all other parts of the Muslim world. Shi'ism did not penetrate any land to the extent that it gradually could in Iran. With the passage of time, Iranians' readiness to practise Shi'ism grew day by day. Had Shi`ism not been deeply rooted in the Iranian spirit, the Safawids (907–1145/1501–1732) would not have succeeded in converting Iranians to the Shi'i creed Ahl al-Bayt sheerly by capturing political power.

===== Pre-Safavid =====
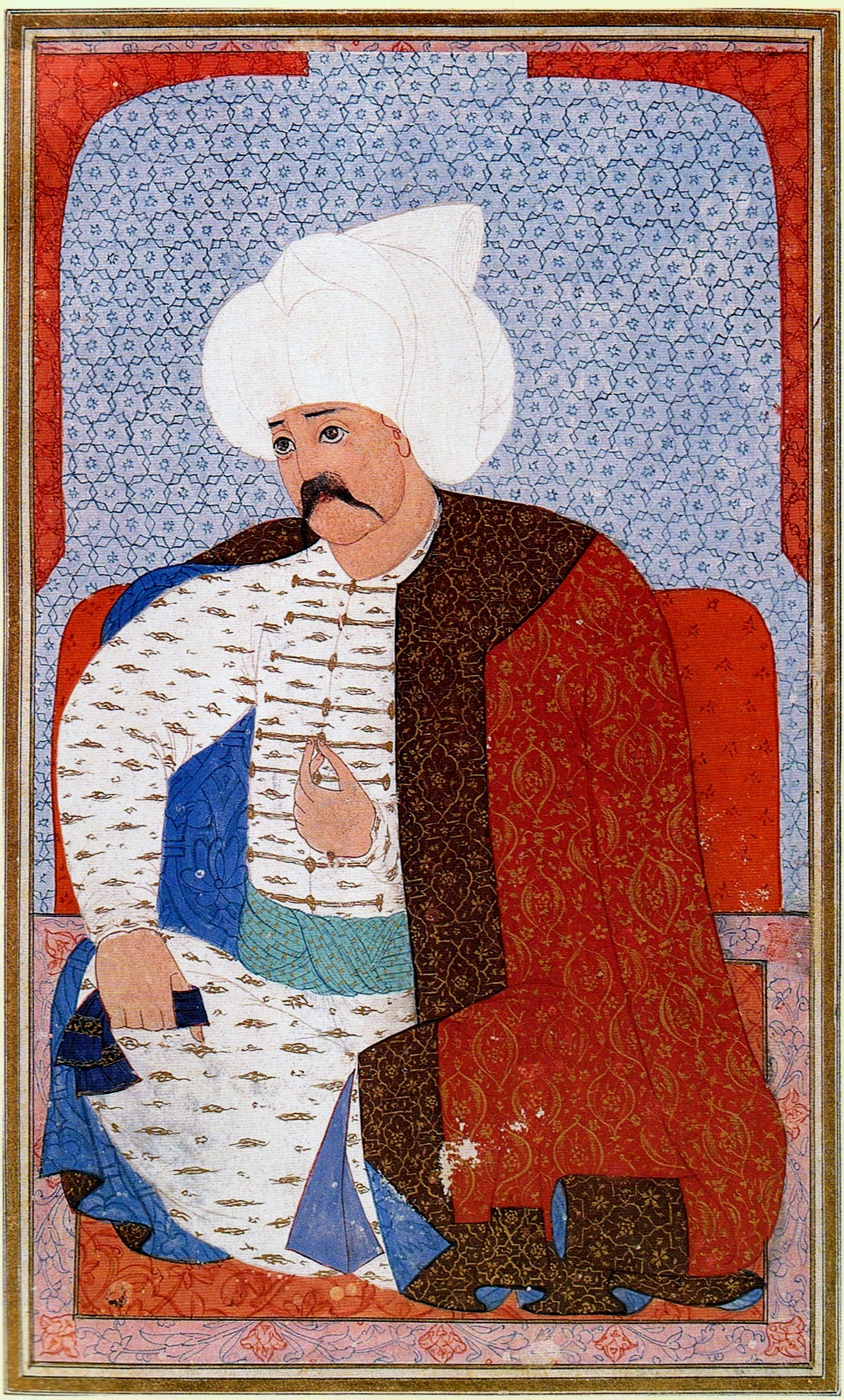
Yavuz Sultan Selim who delivered a devastating blow to the Shia Safavids and Ismail I in the Battle of Chaldiran, a battle of historical significance.

The domination of the Sunni creed during the first nine Islamic centuries characterizes the religious history of Iran during this period. There were some exceptions to this general domination which emerged in the form of the Zaidis of Tabaristan, the Buwayhid, the rule of the Sultan Muhammad Khudabandah (r. 1304–1316) and the Sarbedaran. Nevertheless, apart from this domination there existed, firstly, throughout these nine centuries, Shia inclinations among many Sunnis of this land and, secondly, Twelver and Zaidi Shiism had prevalence in some parts of Iran. During this period, the Shia in Iran were nourished from Kufa, Baghdad and later from Najaf and Al Hillah. Shia were dominant in Tabaristan, Qom, Kashan, Avaj and Sabzevar. In many other areas the population of Shia and Sunni was mixed.

The first Zaidi state was established in Daylaman and Tabaristan (northern Iran) in 864 by the Alavids; it lasted until the death of its leader at the hand of the Samanids in 928. Roughly forty years later the state was revived in Gilan (north-western Iran) and survived under Hasanid leaders until 1126. After which from the 12th–13th centuries, the Zaidis of Daylaman, Gilan and Tabaristan then acknowledged the Zaidi Imams of Yemen or rival Zaidi Imams within Iran.

The Buyids, who were Zaidi and had a significant influence not only in the provinces of Persia but also in the capital of the caliphate in Baghdad, and even upon the caliph himself, provided a unique opportunity for the spread and diffusion of Shia thought. This spread of Shiism to the inner circles of the government enabled the Shia to withstand those who opposed them by relying upon the power of the caliphate.

Twelvers came to Iran from Arab regions in the course of four stages. First, through the Asharis at the end of the 7th and during the 8th century. Second through the pupils of Sabzevar, and especially those of Al-Shaykh Al-Mufid, who were from Rey and Sabzawar and resided in those cities. Third, through the school of Hillah under the leadership of Al-Hilli and his son Fakhr al-Muhaqqiqin. Fourth, through the scholars of Jabal Amel residing in that region, or in Iraq, during the 16th and 17th centuries who later migrated to Iran.

On the other hand, the Ismaili da'wah ("missionary institution") sent missionaries (du'āt, sg. dā'ī) during the Fatimid Caliphate to Persia. When the Ismailis divided into two sects, Nizaris established their base in northern Persia. Hassan-i Sabbah conquered fortresses and captured Alamut in 1090. Nizaris used this fortress until the Mongols finally seized and destroyed it in 1256.

After the Mongols and the fall of the Abbasids, the Sunni Ulama suffered greatly. In addition to the destruction of the caliphate there was no official Sunni school of law. Many libraries and madrasahs were destroyed and Sunni scholars migrated to other Islamic areas such as Anatolia and Egypt. In contrast, most Shia were largely unaffected as their center was not in Iran at this time. For the first time, the Shia could openly convert other Muslims to their movement.

Several local Shia dynasties like the Marashi and Sarbadars were established during this time. The kings of the Kara Koyunlu dynasty ruled in Tabriz with a domain extending to Fars and Kerman. In Egypt the Fatimid government ruled.

Muhammad Khudabandah, the famous builder of Soltaniyeh, was among the first of the Mongols to convert to Shi'ism, and his descendants ruled for many years in Persia and were instrumental in spreading Shī'ī thought. Sufism played a major role in spread of Shiism in this time.

After the Mongol invasion Shiims and Sufism once again formed a close association in many ways. Some of the Ismailis whose power had been broken by the Mongols, went underground and appeared later within Sufi orders or as new branches of already existing orders. In Twelve-Imam Shiism, from the 13th to the 16th century, Sufism began to grow within official Shiite circles. The extremist sects of the Hurufis and Shasha'a grew directly out of a background that is both Shiite and Sufi. More important in the long run than these sects were the Sufi orders which spread in Persia at this time and aided in the preparing the ground for the Shiite movement of Safavids. Two of these orders are of particular significance in this question of the relation of Shiism and Sufism: The Nimatullahi order and Nurbakhshi order.

— Hossein Nasr

===== Post-Safavid =====
Ismail I initiated a religious policy to recognize Shiism as the official religion of the Safavid Empire, and the fact that modern Iran and Azerbaijan remain majority-Shia states is a direct result of Ismail's actions.

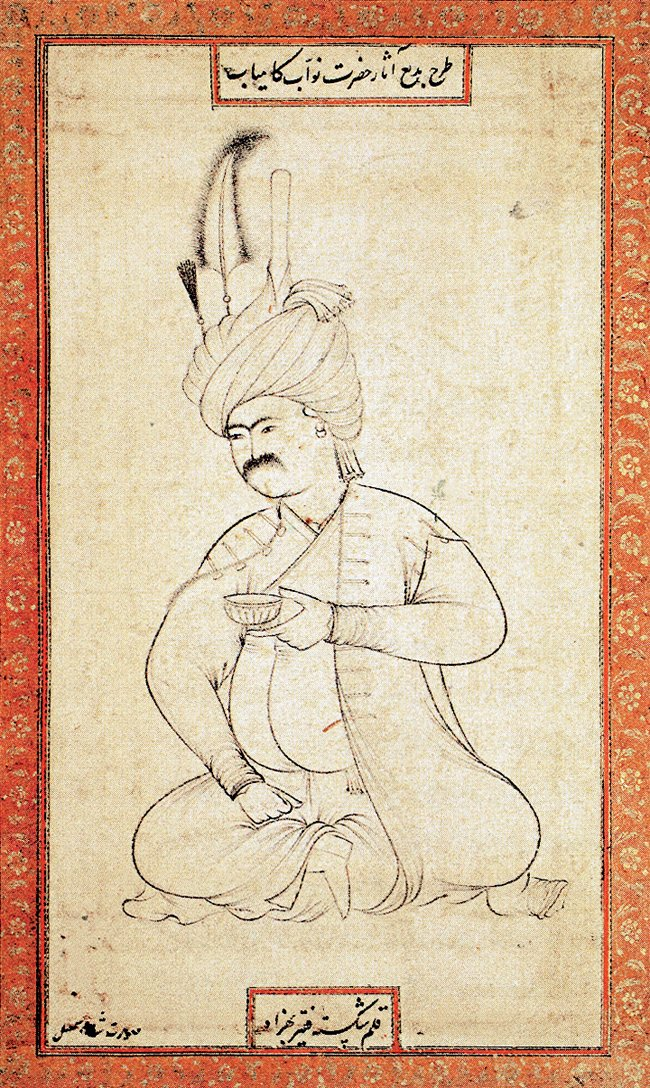
Ismail I of Safavid Empire destroyed the tombs of Abū Ḥanīfa and the Sufi Abdul Qadir Gilani in 1508. In 1533, Ottomans reconquered Iraq and rebuilt Sunni shrines.

However, most of Ismail's subjects were Sunni. As a result, he enforced official Shiism violently, putting to death those who opposed him. Under this pressure, Safavid subjects either converted or pretended to convert. However, it is speculated that the majority of the population was genuinely Shia by the end of the Safavid period in the 18th century, and most Iranians today are Shia, although there is still a Sunni minority.

Immediately following the establishment of Safavid power the migration of scholars began and they were invited to Iran ... By the side of the immigration of scholars, Shi'i works and writings were also brought to Iran from Arabic-speaking lands, and they performed an important role in the religious development of Iran ... In fact, since the time of the leadership of Shaykh Mufid and Shaykh Tusi, Iraq had a central academic position for Shi'ism. This central position was transferred to Iran during the Safavid era for two-and-a-half centuries, after which it partly returned to Najaf. ... Before the Safavid era Shi'i manuscripts were mainly written in Iraq, with the establishment of the Safavid rule these manuscripts were transferred to Iran.

This led to a wide gap between Iran and its Sunni neighbors, particularly its rival, the Ottoman Empire, in the wake of the Battle of Chaldiran. This gap continued until the 20th century.

The Safavid dynasty of Persia was then deposed by the eastern Iranian Hotak Sunni Muslims in the 18th century. Afghanistan today is a mostly Sunni country while Iran, a Shia majority.

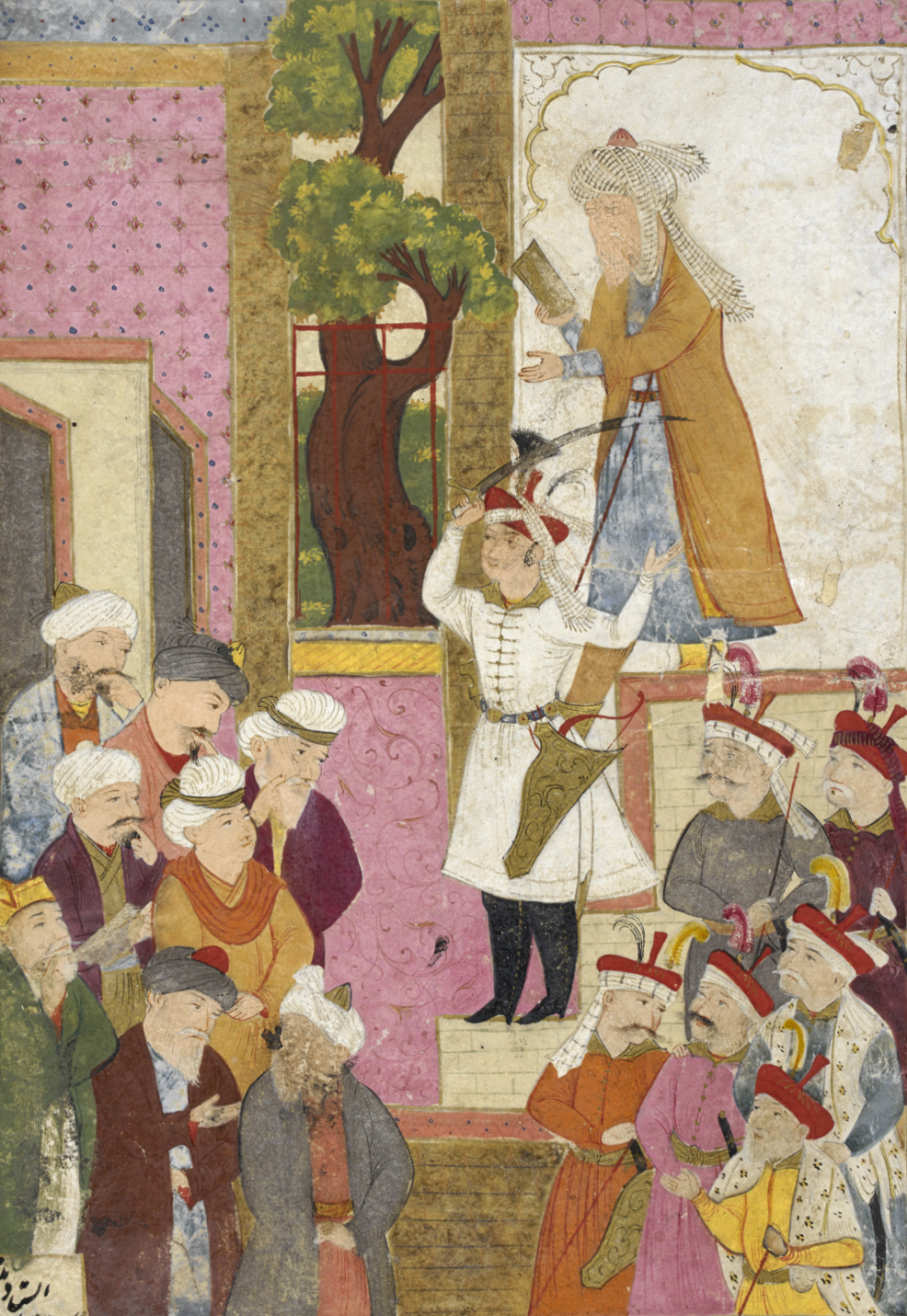
The declaration of Shi'ism as the state religion of the realm by Shah Ismail – 1501 Tabriz central mosque.

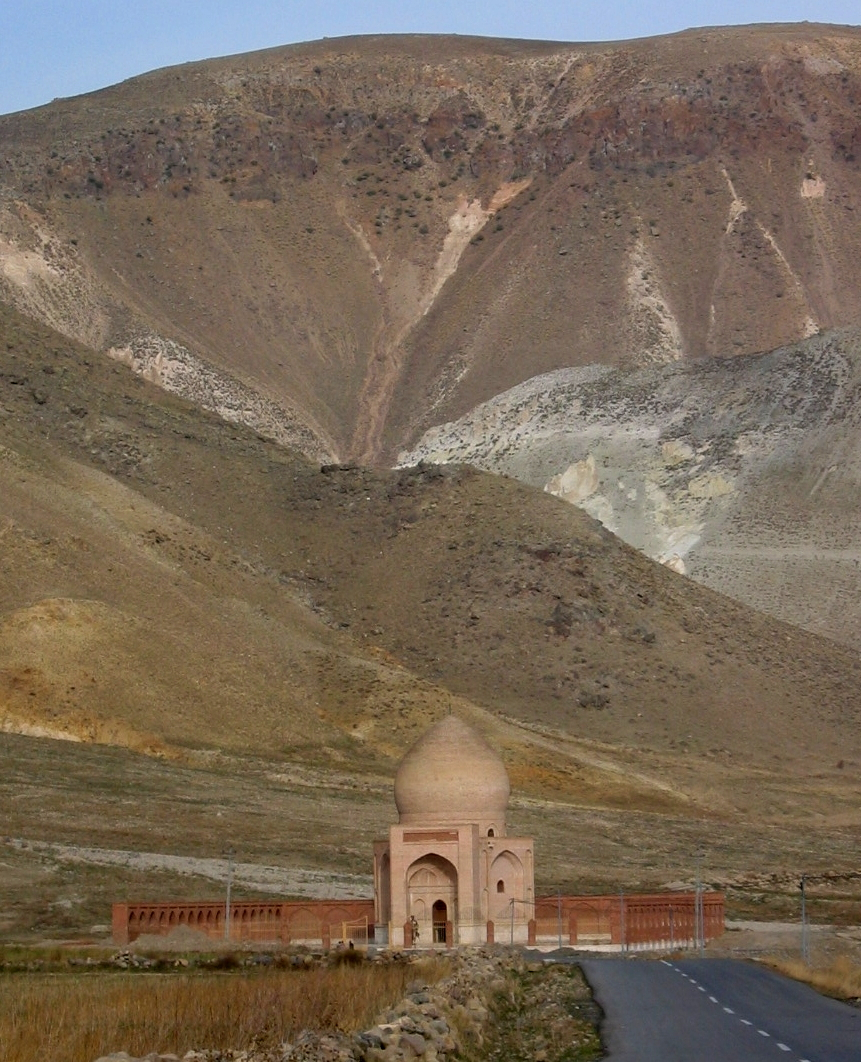
Monument commemorating the Battle of Chaldiran, which was fought between the Sunni Ottoman Empire and the Shia Safavid Empire.

==== Hejaz ====
In the holy cities of Mecca and Medina, where Muslims, including Shia, perform Hajj (one of the pillars of Islam), tensions between Shia and Sunni have waxed and waned. Historian Martin Kramer writes that both Sunni and Shia spread "farfetched" libelous rumours about the other sect – Sunnis that Shia defiled the Ka'bah with excrement, and Shia that Sunni considered the lives of Shi'ite pilgrims to be "forfeit" in a holy shrine where in fact "all forms of strife and bloodshed are forbidden". According to English explorer Richard Francis Burton, a non-Muslim who journeyed to Mecca in disguise in 1853, when a Shi'ite performs hajj,

"that man is happy who gets over it without a beating, [for] in no part of Al-Hijaz are they for a moment safe from abuse and blows."

But in "the late Ottoman years" toleration had reached a level were Shi'ites observed Muharram in Jidda (65 km from Mecca) openly. An Iranian Shi'ite on hajj in 1885 reported:

Previously, in Mecca the populace greatly persecuted the Iranian pilgrims who were Shi'ites, so they had to practice complete dissimulation. These days, because of the weakness of the Ottoman government and the European style civil law which is practiced there, and the strength of the Iranian government, this practice is completely abandoned. There is no harm done to the Iranians. No one would molest them, even if they did not practice dissimulation.

==== Levant ====
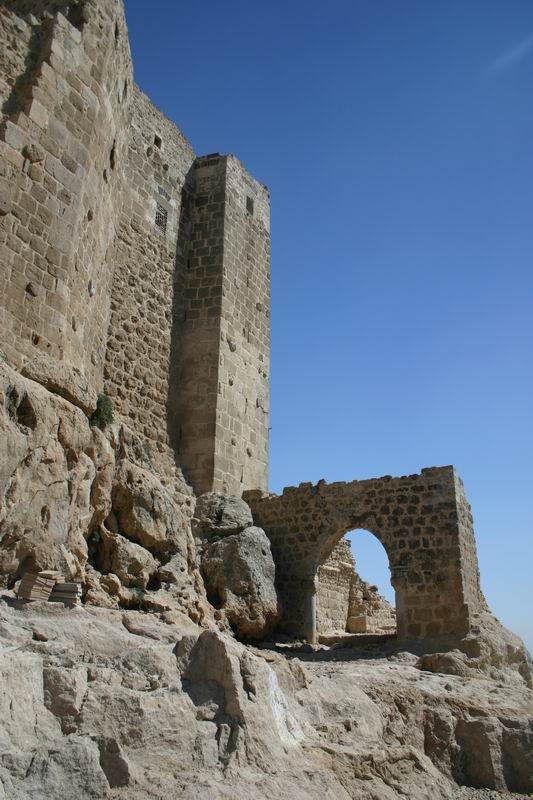
Rashid ad-Din Sinan the Grand Master of the Ismaili Shia at Masyaf successfully deterred Saladin, not to assault the minor territories under the control of their sect.

The Shia faith in the Levant started spreading during the Hamdanid rule, which commenced in the start of the 10th century. It was followed by the Mirdasid Shi'ite emirate in the 11th century, with both the emirates centered at Aleppo.

The general observations recorded by Muslim travellers passing through the Levant during the tenth and eleventh centuries, notably al-Maqdisi in his geographical works, "The best divisions in the knowledge of the regions", as well as Ibn Jubayr, indicate that Shia Muslims made up the majority of the populations of the regions of the Levant during this era, notably in the cities of Damascus, Tiberias, Nablus, Tyre, Homs and Jabal Amel. In addition to the account of Nasir Khusraw who visited Jerusalem in the year 1045 AD and reported: "The population of Jerusalem is about 20,000, the populace being mostly Shi'a Muslims". However, with the advent of the Zengids and Ayyubids, the population of Shia dwindled greatly due to conversion and migrations.

On 21 April 1802, about 12,000 Wahhabi Sunnis under the command of Abdul-Aziz bin Muhammad, the second ruler of the First Saudi State attacked and sacked Karbala, killed between 2,000 and 5,000 inhabitants and plundered the tomb of Husayn ibn Ali, grandson of Muhammad and son of Ali ibn Abi Talib, and destroyed its dome, seizing a large quantity of spoils, including gold, Persian carpets, money, pearls, and guns that had accumulated in the tomb, most of them donations. The attack lasted for eight hours, after which the Wahhabis left the city with more than 4,000 camels carrying their plunder.

==== India ====
===== Mughal Empire =====
Shia in India faced persecution by some Sunni rulers and Mughal Emperors which resulted in the killings of Shia scholars like Qazi Nurullah Shustari (also known as Shaheed-e-Thaalis, the third Martyr) and Mirza Muhammad Kamil Dehlavi (also known as Shaheed-e- Rabay, the fourth Martyr) who are two of the Five Martyrs of Shia Islam.

===== 20th century =====
Sunni–Shia clashes also occurred occasionally in the 20th century in India, particularly between 1904 and 1908. These clashes revolved around the public cursing of the first three caliphs by Shia and the praising of them by Sunnis. To put a stop to the violence, public demonstrations were banned in 1909 on the three most sensitive days: Ashura, Chehlum and Ali's death on 21 Ramadan. Intercommunal violence resurfaced in 1935–36 and again in 1939 when many thousands of Sunni and Shia defied the ban on public demonstrations and took to the streets. Shia are estimated to be 10–15% of the Muslim population in India and Pakistan and less than 1% of Muslim population in Bangladesh, although the total number is difficult to estimate due to the intermingling between the two groups and practice of taqiyya by Shia.

=== Modern history ===
==== 1919–1979 ====
At least one scholar sees the period from the collapse of the Ottoman Empire through the decline of Arab nationalism as a time of relative unity and harmony between traditionalist Sunni and Shia Muslims. A unity brought on by a feeling of being under siege from a common threat, i.e. secularism—first of the European colonial variety and the Arab nationalist.

An example of Sunni–Shia cooperation was the Khilafat Movement which swept South Asia following the defeat of the Ottoman Empire, the seat of the caliphate, in World War I. Shia scholars "came to the caliphate's defence" by attending the 1931 Caliphate Conference in Jerusalem. This was despite the fact that theologically Shia held that imams, not caliphs, were the successors to Muhammad, and that the caliphate was "the flagship institution" of Sunni, not Shia, authority. This has been described as unity of traditionalists in the face of the twin threats of "secularism and colonialism."

That does not mean, however, that there was no friction at all. The Ottoman Empire had projected itself as a guardian of Sunni Islam. This had started, in part, during the sixteenth century in conflict with the Safavid Empire, which had shaped itself around its Shi'i identity. After the fall of the Safavids, this self-identification of the Ottoman Empire had faltered a little since there was no immediate Shi'i 'threat'. The later nineteenth century, under the reign of Sultan Abdul Hamid II, the Sunni Islamic character of the Empire was again mobilized as a nationalist identity. In this context, conversations and polemical debates between Shi'i and Sunni thinkers on the topic of taqrib, sometimes called Islamic ecumenism, took place. These discussions centred around the topic of each other's legitimacy and saw the participation of many in the Islamic intellectual and political sphere. These discussion included contributions of the Azhari shaykh Mustafa al-Maraghi, Rashid Rida, and Abd al-Husayn Sharaf al-Din al-Musawi, and reached its peak with Mahmud Shaltut's fatwa later in the twentieth century.

The early twentieth century also saw the partition of the former Ottoman regions into new colonial protectorates, or (semi-)independent nation-states. This meant that sects, madhhabs, and denominations were administered differently in regions that had previously been under a more unified system. In some regions, like Lebanon for example, sectarian came to play an important role in state formation. This meant that on an administrative level, there was official recognition of the Shi'is in the establishment of a Ja'fari court in which Shi'is of the region could follow their own legal traditions, whereas in the Ottoman period, they had to follow, at least in name, the Hanafi school.

Although Sunni and Shi'i sectarian identities on a religious and administrative level seemed to diverge during the period after the fall of the Ottoman Empire, personal identification with either creed played a more ambiguous role. The recognition of a Ja'fari legal court (Shi'a) in Lebanon led Shi'is in other parts of the Bilad al-Sham to reconsider the validity of their marriages since they might have married in a Hanafi court (Sunni). So, even though discussions on this topic on the level of the ulama make it seem like there are apparent boundaries between Sunnism and Shi' ism, sectarian identification, at the beginning of the twentieth century, was not as immediately apparent.

In 1938, Allama Muhammad Taqi Qummi travelled to Cairo for the purpose of rebuilding/strengthening Islamic unity at Al-Azhar University. His efforts, including connecting with scholars such as Mahmud Shaltut and Seyyed Hossein Borujerdi, led to the founding of Dar-al-Taghrib (community for reforming unity between Sunni and Shia Muslims). Another example of unity was a fatwā issued by the rector of Al-Azhar University, Mahmud Shaltut, recognizing Shia Islamic law as the fifth school of Islamic law. In 1959, al-Azhar University in Cairo, the most influential center of Sunni learning, authorized the teaching of courses of Shia jurisprudence as part of its curriculum.

==== Post-Iranian Revolution era ====
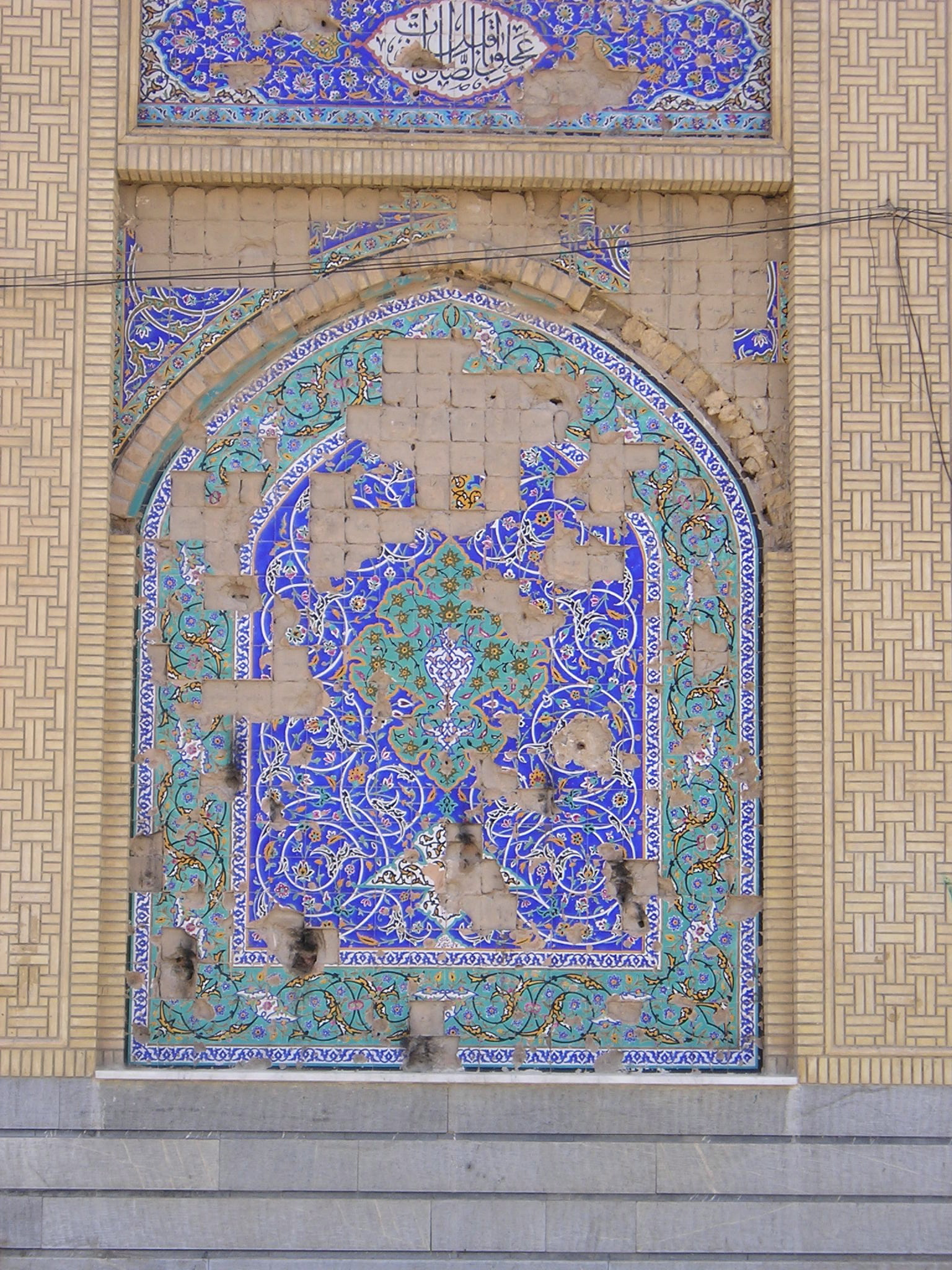
Damage to a mosque in Khorramshahr, Iran

The leader of the Islamic revolution in Iran, Ayatollah Ruhollah Khomeini saw the revolution as an Islamic, not a Shi'i Islamic revolution. His revolution was (he hoped) just the first and would spread throughout the Muslim world, with Iran serving as "the base for a global Islamic movement", and himself as the leader, just as Lenin and Trotsky had hoped the Bolshevik Revolution would be only the first communist revolution. The year of the revolution was "one of great ecumenical discourse" and shared enthusiasm by both Shia and Sunni Islamists.

Khomeini endeavored to bridge the gap between Shias and Sunnis by declaring it permissible for Twelvers to pray behind Sunni imams and by forbidding criticizing the caliphs who preceded Ali—an issue that had caused much animosity between the two groups. He focused on issues that united Muslims – anti-Imperialism, anti-Zionism, anti-Americanism, and "the battle against outsiders" – rather than "religious questions that were likely to divide them". In addition, Khomeini designated the period of Muhammad's birthday celebrations from 12th to the 17th of Rabi Al-Awwal as the Islamic Unity Week, (there being a gap in the dates of when Shias and Sunnis celebrate Muhammad's birthday).

===== Outbreak of sectarianism =====
Sunni–Shia unity did not last long after the Iranian revolution, and strife between the two sects took a major upturn, the "Shia awakening and its instrumentalisation by Iran" as leading to a "very violent Sunni reaction", starting first in Pakistan before spreading to "the rest of the Muslim world, without necessarily being as violent." As of 2008, "Azerbaijan is probably the only country where there are still mixed mosques and Shia and Sunnis pray together."

Discord manifested itself in major and minor ways, from bombings that killed thousands, to cultural changes. Among the immediate causes of the violence were the Islamic revolution in Iran and the 2003 American military intervention in Iraq.

These led to antipathy between the Islamic Republic of Iran and the Kingdom of Saudi Arabia, who mobilized supporters against the other, between Sunni Muhammad Zia-ul-Haq (president of Pakistan, and neighbor to Iran) and Shia Iranian supreme leader Ruhollah Khomeini, growth of sectarian militias, and the change in attitude of Sunni towards Shia from misguided brethren to heretics, a viewpoint spread not by "marginal extremists" but "senior Sunni Ulama".

Hate speech against both Sunni and Shia began to be spread on satellite television and the internet starting in the mid-1990s. Fundamentalist Sunni clerics popularized slurs against Shia such as "Safawis" (from the Safavid Empire, thus implying their being Iranian agents), or even worse rafidha (rejecters of the faith), and majus (Zoroastrian or crypto Persian). Militant Sunnis began naming their sons after historic enemies of Shi'i heroes (Muawiya—enemy of the first Shi'i Imam Ali, and Yazid—held responsible by Shia for killing Husayn ibn Ali) ("Breaking taboos against honoring the caliphs who had persecuted and killed members of the Prophet's family"; "Eulogies" for these two Umayyad caliphs "became an important part of the new anti-Shia discourse".) Ashura was condemned as "a heathen spectacle" and an "affront to the memory" of the rightful caliphs; and Shi'i Imams as "un-Islamic historical figures" whom all Sunnis should "actively reject". In turn, Shia religious scholars have "mocked and cursed" the first three caliphs and Aisha (Mohammed's youngest wife who fought against Ali).

== Growth in sectarianism ==
Among the explanations for the growth in sectarianism are conspiracies by outside forces to divide Muslims, the recent Islamic revival and increased religious purity and consequent takfir, upheaval, destruction and loss of power of Sunni caused by the US invasion of Iraq, and sectarianism generated by Arab regimes defending themselves against the mass uprisings of the Arab Spring.

=== Outside conspiracies ===
Many in the Muslim world blame the bloodshed on the supposed work of conspiracies by outside forces—"the forces of hegemony and Zionism which aim to weaken [Arabs]" (Akbar Hashemi Rafsanjani and Yusuf al-Qaradawi), unspecified "enemies" (Iran president Mahmoud Ahmadinejad), or "oppressive pressure by the imperialist front." (Mahmoud Ahmadinejad). (Note: After 200 mostly Shia Iranians were killed during hajj by a stampede and Saudi gunfire Ali Khamene'i, (then the president of Iran), proclaimed that "They are now propagandizing and claiming that this incident was a war between Shi'ites and Sunnis. This is a lie! Of course there is a war; but a war between the American perception of Islam and true revolutionary Islam.")

Some Western analysts assert that the US is practicing divide and rule strategy through the escalation of Sunni-Shia conflict. Nafeez Ahmed cites a 2008 RAND Corporation study for the American military which recommended "divide and rule" as a possible strategy whereby the US takes "the side of the conservative Sunni regimes ... working with them against all Shia empowerment movements in the Muslim world". On the other hand, the Pakistani Sunni jihadist organization Lashkar-e-Jhangvi has declared that it is the Shia of Pakistan and Iraq who are "'American agents' and the 'near enemy' in the global jihad against America". Christopher Davidson argues that the crisis in Yemen is being "egged on" by the US, and could be part of a wider covert strategy to "spur fragmentation in Iran allies and allow Israel to be surrounded by weak states".

=== Islamic revival ===
Others (Martin Seth Kramer, Vali Nasr) lay the blame for the strife at a very different source, the unintended effects of the Islamic revival. Historian Martin Seth Kramer (writing circa mid-1990s), argues that the focus on alleging "plots" by outsiders and/or claims by one side that the issue is only with an extremist group on the other side (for example Wahhabism or Khomeinism), distracts from the seriousness of the problem:

For most Muslims, it is no longer considered politic to dwell openly on the differences between Sunni and Shi'ite Islam. Indeed, merely to cite these differences is regarded by many as part of an imperialist plot to foment division in Islam. The new sectarianism takes a subtler form: Shi'ites profess their unity of purpose with Sunnis, but then declare that a major expression of Sunnism (in this case, Saudi Wahhabism) is a deviation from ecumenical Islam. Sunnis declare their acceptance of Shi'ites as Muslims, but then declare that a major expression of Shi'ism (in this case, Iran's revolutionary activism) constitutes a deviation from ecumenical Islam. In this manner, sectarian prejudice is insinuated, even as the unity of Islam is openly professed.

According to scholar Vali Nasr, as the Muslim world was decolonialised and Arab nationalism lost its appeal, religion filled its place. As religion became more important, so did a return to its fundamentals and a following of its finer points; differences once overlooked became deviations to be denouncing and fought, and there were many differences between Sunni and Shia. Fundamentalism blossomed and conflicts reasserted, in particular when Sunni followed the strict teachings of Sunni scholar Ibn Taymiyyah, who considered Shia apostates and who is held in high regard by Sunni Salafi.

==== Iranian Islamic revolution ====
An indirect way the Islamic revival led to discord between the two major schools of Islam was through the Iranian Islamic revolution. The revolution was a direct result of the Islamic revival, led by an Islamist, Ayatollah Ruhollah Khomeini, who was very much in favor of Islamic unity, and "the leadership position that went with it". At first the revolution inspired and energized Islamist Muslims (both Shia and Sunni) everywhere, but it was a revolution in a predominantly Shi'i Muslim country, led by Shi'i Muslims, and serious rifts with Sunni Muslims soon developed.

The revolution changed the Shia–Sunni power equation in Muslim countries "from Lebanon to India". It aroused the traditionally subservient Shia, to the alarm of traditionally dominant and very non-revolutionary Sunni. "Where Iranian revolutionaries saw Islamic revolutionary stirrings, Sunnis saw mostly Shia mischief and a threat to Sunni predominance."

Notwithstanding the desire of Iran's leader, Khomeini, for Shia–Sunni unity, as an Islamist revolutionary flush with success that had surprised Iranians as well as the rest of the world, Khomeini now sought the overthrow of unworthy governments in Muslim-majority countries (which were all Sunni regimes except for Ibadi-led Oman, Khomeini's government being the only Shi'i-led country at the time). Pro-American monarchies in particular were high on that list, and at the very top was the Kingdom of Saudi Arabia, not only a Wahhabi state with a long tradition of anti-Shi'ism, but an "American lackey" and "unpopular and corrupt dictatorship" (in his view, especially after seeing the 1979 Grand Mosque seizure), ripe for revolution, like "a ripe apple ready to fall into" their hands. But Saudi Arabia was also spending billions of dollars every year funding Islamic schools, scholarships, and fellowships, mosques around the Sunni world. "Thousands of aspiring preachers, Islamic scholars, and activists from Nigeria to Indonesia went to Saudi Arabia to study, and many more joined Saudi-funded think tanks and research institutions." They "then spread throughout the Muslim world to teach" what they had learned and "work at Saudi-funded universities, schools, mosques, and research institutions." Khomeini's attack was opposed not only by the Saudi royal family but by its many (Sunni) fundamentalist allies and benefactors throughout the Arab world. For them the House of Saud was very popular, a leader of Islamic revival. (Note: Writing in 2016, Max Fisher argues "Sunni-Shia sectarianism is indeed tearing apart the Middle East, but is largely driven by the very modern and very political rivalry between Iran and Saudi Arabia", whose "real roots" are not theological.) Saudi propaganda efforts proceeded to go after both Khomeini's Shia identity, and to "drive all possible wedges between Sunnism and Shiism".

Another indirect effect (noted by political scientist Gilles Kepel), was that however religious the Saudi regime was already, in the immediate wake of Iran's Revolution it was motivated to further shore up its "religious legitimacy" with more strictness in religion (and with jihad in Afghanistan) to compete with the grassroots enthusiasm for Iran's Islamism. But this also meant moving in a more anti-Shia religious direction because (as mentioned above) Saudi's own native Sunni school of Islam (Wahhabism, like that of Ibn Taymiyyah), did not consider Shiism part of the diversity of Islam, but a heresy to be fought. This new strictness was spread among the thousands of students in Saudi funded schools and more importantly among the international Islamist volunteers who came to training camps in Peshawar Pakistan in the 1980s to learn to fight jihad against Marxist secularists in Afghanistan and went home to fight jihad in the 1990s. Both groups (especially in Iraq and Pakistan) saw Shia as the enemy.

Other Sunni Muslim states—Indonesia, Egypt—also "quickly moved" to bolster their Islamic credentials and inoculate themselves from the fate of the shah, aware of the plans the Iranian Islamist revolutionaries had for their downfall. A number of incidents convinced several Muslim heads of state (again, all Sunni) of Khomeini's contempt for them and the need to "contain" him: A delegation of Muslim heads of state that came to Tehran to mediate an end to the Iran-Iraq war was kept waiting for two hours before Khomeini appeared to make a ten-minute untranslated statement seated while his visitors stood—and then leaving; a street in Tehran was named after the killer of the President of Egypt, Anwar Sadat; a threat by Khomeini to do to Pakistani President Zia ul-Haq—a pious conservative Muslim seeking to Islamize Pakistan – "what he had done to the Shah" if Zia mistreated the Shia in Pakistan, and on another occasion mockery of Zia's warning not to provoke a superpower by saying he, (Khomeini), had his own superpower – his being God while Zia's was the United States.

Following the Iranian Revolution, "avowedly Shia political movements", often getting funding from the IRI, and "pushing specifically Shia political agendas", emerged in to 2015, Shia groups in Lebanon, Iraq, Syria, Yemen, supported by Iran. By 2015 they had won "important political victories" which have boosted Iran's regional influence. In Lebanon, Hezbollah, the Lebanese Shia militia and political movement is the "strongest political actor" in the country. Since the 2003 invasion of Iraq removed Saddam Hussein from power and instituted elected government, the Shia majority has dominated the parliament and its prime ministers have been Shia. In Syria, a Shia minority—the heterodox Alawi sect that makes up only about 13 percent of the population—dominate the upper reaches of the government, military and security services in Syria, and are the "backbone" of the forces fighting to protect the Bashar al-Assad regime in Syria's civil war. In Yemen, Houthi rebels have expanded their territory south of Saudi Arabia, and become the country's "dominant power".

=== US invasion of Iraq ===
Among those blaming the US invasion of Iraq for the growth in sectarianism are Fawaz Gerges, who writes in his book ISIS: A History,

By destroying state institutions and establishing a sectarian-based political system, the 2003 US-led invasion polarized the country along Sunni-Shia lines and set the stage for a fierce, prolonged struggle driven by identity politics. Anger against the United States was also fueled by the humiliating disbandment of the Iraqi army and the de-Baathification law, which was first introduced as a provision and then turned into a permanent article of the constitution.

Malise Ruthven writes that the post invasion de-Ba'athification by the US occupiers deprived Iraq of "the officer class and administrative cadres that had ruled under Saddam Hussein, leaving the field to sectarian-based militias". Many of officers joined the anti-Shia takfiri ISIL group.

The US-led invasion also "tilted the regional balance of power decisively" in favor of Shia Iran, alarming Sunni and leading to talk of a "Shia Crescent".

=== Counter-revolutionary tactic ===
Marc Lynch in his book The New Arab Wars: Uprisings and Anarchy in the Middle East, argues that as old regimes or political forces sought to control "the revolutionary upsurge" of the Arab Spring, sectarianism became "a key weapon" to undermine unity among the anti-regime masses. Christians were pitted "against Muslims in Egypt, Jordanians against Palestinians in Jordan, and, above all, Sunnis against Shi'ites wherever possible."

== Relations by country and region ==
=== Iraq ===
Shia–Sunni discord in Iraq starts with disagreement over the relative population of the two groups. The governing regimes of Iraq were composed mainly of Sunnis for nearly a century until the 2003 Iraq War, but according to most sources, the majority of the population is Shia. The CIA's World Factbook, estimates Shia Arab Muslims as making up 60% of Iraqis, and Sunni muslims 37%. However, Sunni are split ethnically among Arabs, Kurds and Turkmen. Many Sunnis hotly dispute their minority status, (including ex-Iraqi Ambassador Faruq Ziada), and many believe Shia majority is "a myth spread by America". One Sunni belief shared by Jordan's King Abdullah as well as his then Defense Minister Shaalan is that Shia numbers in Iraq were inflated by Iranian Shia crossing the border. Shia scholar Vali Nasr believes the election turnout in summer and December 2005 confirmed a strong Shia majority in Iraq.

The British, having put down a Shia rebellion against their rule in the 1920s, "confirmed their reliance on a corps of Sunni ex-officers of the collapsed Ottoman Empire". The British colonial rule ended after the Sunni and Shia united against it.

The Shia suffered indirect and direct persecution under post-colonial Iraqi governments since 1932, erupting into full-scale rebellions in 1935 and 1936. Shia were also persecuted during the Ba'ath Party rule, especially under Saddam Hussein. It is said that every Shia clerical family of note in Iraq had tales of torture and murder to recount. In 1969 the son of Iraq's highest Shia Ayatollah Muhsin al-Hakim was arrested and allegedly tortured. From 1979 to 1983 Saddam's regime executed 48 major Shia clerics in Iraq. They included Shia leader Mohammad Baqir al-Sadr and his sister. Tens of thousands of Iranians and Arabs of Iranian origin were expelled in 1979 and 1980 and a further 75,000 in 1989.

The Shia openly revolted against Saddam following the Gulf War in 1991 and were encouraged by Saddam's defeat in Kuwait and by simultaneous Kurdish uprising in the north. However, Shia opposition to the government was brutally suppressed, resulting in some 50,000 to 100,000 casualties and successive repression by Saddam's forces.

==== Iraq War ====
Some of the worst sectarian strife has occurred following the start of the Iraq War, and continues at least as of 2016. The war has featured a cycle of Sunni–Shia revenge killing—Sunni often used car bombs, while Shia favored death squads. As part of its rivalry with Iran, Saudi Arabia spent "tens of billions of dollars" helping Saddam Hussein's war effort.

According to one estimate, as of early 2008, 1121 suicide bombers have blown themselves up in Iraq. Sunni suicide bombers have targeted not only thousands of civilians, but mosques, shrines, wedding and funeral processions, markets, hospitals, offices, and streets. Sunni insurgent organizations include Ansar al-Islam. Radical groups include Al-Tawhid Wal-Jihad, Jeish Muhammad, and Black Banner Organization.

Takfir motivation for many of these killings may come from Sunni insurgent leader Abu Musab al-Zarqawi. Before his death Zarqawi was one to quote Muhammad ibn Abd al-Wahhab, especially his infamous statement urging followers to kill the Shia of Iraq, and calling the Shia "snakes".

Another explanation found in his February 2004 open letter to supporters is that by attack Shia he would provoke them to attack Sunnis and thus "awaken" Sunnis who previously had not wanted a sectarian war to join his side. The "cunning" Shia planned to build a state "stretching from Iran through Iraq, Syria and Lebanon" to the Gulf kingdoms, but by attacking Shia in their "religious, political, and military depth" his jihadis would "drag" the Shia "into the arena of sectarian war", and leading them to "bare the teeth of the hidden rancor working in their breasts" and so "awaken the inattentive Sunnis as they feel imminent danger and annihilating death at the hands of theses Sabeans", i.e. Shia.

An al-Qaeda-affiliated website posted a call for "a full-scale war on Shiites all over Iraq, whenever and wherever they are found." Suicide bombers continue to attack Iraqi Shia civilians, and the Shia ulama have in response declared suicide bombing as haraam (against God, or "forbidden"):

حتی كسانی كه با انتحار می‌آيند و می‌زنند عده‌ای را می‌كشند، آن هم به عنوان عملیات انتحاری، این‌ها در قعر جهنم هستند
Even those who kill people with suicide bombing, these shall meet the flames of hell.

— Ayatollah Yousef Saanei

Some believe the war has strengthened the takfir thinking and may spread Sunni–Shia strife elsewhere.

On the Shia side, in early February 2006 militia-dominated government death squads were reportedly "tortur[ing] to death or summarily" executing "hundreds" of Sunnis "every month in Baghdad alone," many arrested at random. According to the British television Channel 4, from 2005 through early 2006, commandos of the Ministry of the Interior which is controlled by the Badr Organization, and

...who are almost exclusively Shia Muslims—have been implicated in rounding up and killing thousands of ordinary Sunni civilians.

The violence shows little sign of getting opposite sides to back down. Iran's Shia leaders are said to become "more determined" the more violent the anti-Shia attacks in Iraq become. One Shia Grand Ayatollah, Yousef Saanei, who has been described as a moderate, reacted to the 2005 suicide bombings of Shia targets in Iraq by saying the bombers were "wolves without pity" and that "sooner rather than later, Iran will have to put them down".

In addition to Iran, Iraq has emerged as a major Shia government when the Twelvers achieved political dominance in 2005 under American occupation. The two communities have often remained separate, mingling regularly only during the Hajj pilgrimage in Mecca. In some countries like Iraq, Syria, Kuwait and Bahrain, communities have mingled and intermarried. Some Shia have complained of mistreatment in countries dominated by Sunnis, especially in Saudi Arabia, while some Sunnis have complained of discrimination in the Twelver-dominated states of Iraq and Iran.

=== Iran ===
Iran is unique in the Muslim world because its population is overwhelmingly more Shia than Sunni (Shia constitute around 90% of the population) and because its constitution is theocratic republic based on rule by a Shia jurist.

After the founder of the Islamic republic, Ayatollah Ruhollah Khomeini came into power tension developed between Sunnis and Shia as a result of clashes over Iranian pilgrims and Saudi police at the hajj. Millions of Saudi adhere to the school of Salafism which is a branch of Sunni Islam.

Inside Iran there have been complaints by Sunni of discrimination, particularly in important government positions. In a joint appearance with former Iranian president Akbar Hashemi Rafsanjani calling for Shia-Sunni unity, Sunni Shiekh Yusuf al-Qaradawi complained that no ministers in Iran have been Sunni for a long time, that Sunni officials are scarce even in the regions with majority of Sunni population (such as Kurdistan, or Balochistan) and despite the presence of Christian churches, as a prominent example of this discrimination. Although reformist President Mohammad Khatami promised during his election campaign to build a Sunni mosque in Tehran, none was built during his eight years in office. The president explained the situation by saying Supreme Leader Ayatollah Ali Khamenei would not agree to the proposal. As in other parts of the Muslim world, other issues may play a part in the conflict, since most Sunnis in Iran are also ethnic minorities.

Soon after the 1979 revolution, Sunni leaders from Kurdistan, Balouchistan, and Khorassan, set up a new party known as Shams, which is short for Shora-ye Markaz-e al Sunaat, to unite Sunnis and lobby for their rights. But six months after that they were closed down, bank accounts suspended and had their leaders arrested by the government on charges that they were backed by Saudi Arabia and Pakistan.

A UN human rights report states that:

...information indicates Sunnis, along with other religious minorities, are denied by law or practice access to such government positions as cabinet minister, ambassador, provincial governor, mayor and the like, Sunni schools and mosques have been destroyed, and Sunni leaders have been imprisoned, executed and assassinated. The report notes that while some of the information received may be difficult to corroborate there is a clear impression that the right of freedom of religion is not being respected with regard to the Sunni minority.

Members of the 'Balochistan Peoples Front' claim that Sunnis are systematically discriminated against educationally by denial of places at universities, politically by not allowing Sunnis to be army generals, ambassadors, ministers, prime minister, or president, religiously insulting Sunnis in the media, economic discrimination by not giving import or export licenses for Sunni businesses while the majority of Sunnis are left unemployed.

There has been a low level resistance in mainly Sunni Iranian Balouchistan against the regime for several years. Official media refers to the fighting as armed clashes between the police and "bandits," "drug-smugglers," and "thugs," to disguise what many believe is essentially a political-religious conflict. Revolutionary Guards have stationed several brigades in Balouchi cities, and have allegedly tracked down and assassinated Sunni leaders both inside Iran and in neighboring Pakistan. In 1996 a leading Sunni, Abdulmalek Mollahzadeh, was gunned down by hitmen, allegedly hired by Tehran, as he was leaving his house in Karachi.

Members of Sunni groups in Iran however have been active in what the authorities describe as terrorist activities. Balochi Sunni Abdolmalek Rigi continue to declare the Shia as Kafir and Mushrik. These Sunni groups have been involved in violent activities in Iran and have waged terrorist attacks against civilian centers, including an attack next to a girls' school according to government sources. The "shadowy Sunni militant group Jundallah" has reportedly been receiving weaponry from the United States for these attacks according to the semi-official Fars News Agency. The United Nations and several countries worldwide have condemned the bombings. (See 2007 Zahedan bombings for more information)

Following the 2005 elections, much of the leadership of Iran has been described as more "staunchly committed to core Shia values" and lacking Ayatollah Khomeini's commitment to Shia–Sunni unity. Polemics critical of Sunnis were reportedly being produced in Arabic for dissemination in the Arab Muslim world by Hojjatieh-aligned elements in the Iranian regime. Sunni mosques are not allowed in the capital city of Tehran, and a number of Sunni mosques in other cities have been demolished, Sunni literature and teachings are banned in public schools and construction of new Sunni mosques and schools are banned.

=== Syria ===
Syria is approximately three-quarters Sunni, but its government is predominantly Alawite, a Shia sect that makes up less than 13% of the population. Under Hafez al-Assad, Alawites dominated the Arab Socialist Ba'ath Party, a secular Arab nationalist party which had ruled Syria under a state of emergency from 1963 to 2011. Alawites are often considered a form of Shia Islam, that differs somewhat from the larger Twelver Shia sect.

During the 20th century, an Islamic uprising in Syria occurred with sectarian religious overtones between the Alawite-dominated Assad government and the Islamist Sunni Muslim Brotherhood, culminating with the 1982 Hama massacre. An estimated 10,000 to 40,000 Syrians, mostly civilians, were killed by Syrian military in the city. During the uprising, the Sunni Muslim Brotherhood attacked military cadets at an artillery school in Aleppo, performed car bomb attacks in Damascus, as well as bomb attacks against the government and its officials, including Hafez al-Assad himself, and had killed several hundred.

How much of the conflict was sparked by Sunni versus Shia divisions and how much by Islamism versus secular-Arab-nationalism, is in question, but according to scholar Vali Nasr the failure of the Ayatollah Khomeini and the Islamic Republic of Iran to support the Muslim Brotherhood against the Baathists "earned [Khomeini] the Brotherhood's lasting contempt." It proved to the satisfaction of the Brotherhood that sectarian loyalty trumped Islamist solidarity for Khomeini and eliminated whatever appeal Khomeini might have had to the MB movement as a pan-Islamic leader.

==== Syria Civil War ====
The Syrian Civil War, though it started as a political conflict, developed into a struggle between the Alawite-dominated Army and government on the one hand, and the mainly Sunni rebels and former members of the regular army on the other. The casualty toll of the war's first three years has exceeded that of Iraq's decade-long conflict, and the fight has "amplified sectarian tensions to unprecedented levels". Rebel groups with 10,000s of Sunni Syrian fighters such as Ahrar ash-Sham, the Islamic Front, and al-Qaeda's al-Nusra Front, employ anti-Shia rhetoric and foreign Arab and Western Sunni fighters have joined the rebels. On the other side Shia from Hezbollah in Lebanon and from Asaib Ahl al-Haq and Kata'ib Hezbollah militias from Iraq have backed the Syrian government. "Even Afghan Shia refugees in Iran", driven from Afghanistan by Sunni extremism, have "reportedly been recruited by Tehran for the war in Syria".

According to some reports, as of mid-2013, the Syrian Civil War has become "overtly sectarian" with the "sectarian lines fall most sharply" between Alawites and Sunnis. With the involvement of Lebanese Shia paramilitary group Hezbollah, the fighting in Syria has reignited "long-simmering tensions between Sunnis and Shi'ites" spilling over into Lebanon and Iraq. Bulgaria's ex-Ambassador Dimitar Mihaylov further claims that the current post-Arab Spring situation (encompassing ISIS, the Syrian civil war, Yemen, Iraq and others) represents a "qualitatively new" development in the history of Shi'a-Sunni dynamics. Historically, the inner rifts within Islamic ideology were to be hidden from the public sphere, while the new violent outbreaks highlight said rift in an obvious manner and is nourished by the two extremes of their mutual rivalry which will strongly affect both globally and regionally.

=== Saudi Arabia ===
While Shia make up roughly 10% of Saudi Arabia's population, they form a large portion of the residents of the Eastern Province—by some estimates a majority—where much of the petroleum industry is based. Between 500,000 and a million Shia live there, concentrated especially around the oases of Qatif and al-Hasa. The Majority of Saudi Shia belong to the sect of the Twelvers.

The Saudi conflict of Shia and Sunni extends beyond the borders of the kingdom because of international Saudi "Petro-Islam" influence. Saudi Arabia backed Iraq in the 1980–1988 war with Iran and sponsored militants in Pakistan and Afghanistan who—though primarily targeting the Soviet Union, which had invaded Afghanistan in 1979—also fought to suppress Shia movements.

Relations between the Shia and the Wahhabis are inherently strained because the Wahhabis consider the rituals of the Shia to be the epitome of shirk, or polytheism. In the late 1920s, the Ikhwan (Ibn Saud's fighting force of converted Wahhabi Bedouin Muslims) were particularly hostile to the Shia and demanded that Abd al Aziz forcibly convert them. In response, Abd al Aziz sent Wahhabi missionaries to the Eastern Province, but he did not carry through with attempts at forced conversion. In recent decades the late leading Saudi cleric, Ibn Baz, issued fatwa denouncing Shia as apostates, and according to Shia scholar Vali Nasr " Ibn Jibrin, a high-ranking Salafi cleric, even sanctioned the killing of Shia, a call that was reiterated by Wahhabi religious literature as late as 2002."

Government policy has been to allow Shia their own mosques and to exempt Shia from Salafi inheritance practices. Nevertheless, Shia have been forbidden all but the most modest displays on their principal festivals, which are often occasions of sectarian strife in the Persian Gulf region, with its mixed Sunni–Shia populations.

According to a report by the Human Rights Watch:

Shia Muslims, who constitute about eight percent of the Saudi population, faced discrimination in employment as well as limitations on religious practices. Shia jurisprudence books were banned, the traditional annual Shia mourning procession of Ashura was discouraged, and operating independent Islamic religious establishments remained illegal. At least seven Shi'a religious leaders-Abd al-Latif Muhammad Ali, Habib al-Hamid, Abd al-Latif al-Samin, Abdallah Ramadan, Sa'id al-Bahaar, Muhammad Abd al-Khidair, and Habib Hamdah Sayid Hashim al-Sadah-reportedly remained in prison for violating these restrictions."

And Amnesty International adds:

Members of the Shi'a Muslim community (estimated at between 7 and 10 per cent of Saudi Arabia's population of about 19 million) suffer systematic political, social, cultural as well as religious discrimination.

As of 2006 four of the 150 members of Saudi Arabia's "handpicked" parliament were Shia, but no city had a Shia mayor or police chief, and none of the 300 girls schools for Shia in the Eastern Province had a Shia principal. According to scholar Vali Nasr, Saudi textbooks "characterize Shiism as a form of heresy ... worse than Christianity and Judaism."

Forced into exile in the 1970s, Saudi Shia leader Hassan al-Saffar is said to have been "powerfully influenced" by the works of Sunni Islamists of the Muslim Brotherhood and Jamaat-e-Islami and by their call for Islamic revolution and an Islamic state.

Following the 1979 Iranian Revolution, Shia in Hasa ignored the ban on mourning ceremonies commemorating Ashura. When police broke them up three days of rampage ensued—burned cars, attacked banks, looted shops—centered around Qatif. At least 17 Shia were killed. In February 1980 disturbances were "less spontaneous" and even bloodier. Meanwhile, broadcasts from Iran in the name of the Islamic Revolutionary Organization attacked the monarchy, telling listeners, "Kings despoil a country when they enter it and make the noblest of its people its meanest ... This is the nature of monarchy, which is rejected by Islam."

By 1993, Saudi Shia had abandoned uncompromising demands and some of al-Saffar's followers met with King Fahd with promises made for reform. In 2005 the new King Abdullah also relaxed some restrictions on the Shia. However, Shia continue to be arrested for commemorating Ashura as of 2006. In December 2006, amidst escalating tensions in Iraq, 38 high ranking Saudi clerics called on Sunni Muslims around the world to "mobilise against Shiites". A year later, Shia Grand Ayatollah Naser Makarem Shirazi is reported to have responded:

The Wahhabis ignore the occupation of Islam's first Qiblah by Israel, and instead focus on declaring Takfiring fatwas against Shia.

Another reflection of grassroots Wahhabi or Saudi antipathy to Shia was a statement by Saudi cleric Nasir al-Umar, who accused Iraqi Shia of close ties to the United States and argued that both were enemies of Muslims everywhere.

==== Al-Qaeda ====
Some Wahabi groups, often labeled as takfiri and sometimes linked to Al-Qaeda, have even advocated the persecution of the Shia as heretics. Such groups have been allegedly responsible for violent attacks and suicide bombings at Shi'a gatherings at mosques and shrines, most notably in Iraq during the Ashura mourning ceremonies where hundreds of Shia were killed in coordinated suicide bombings, but also in Pakistan and Afghanistan. However, in a video message, Al-Qaeda deputy Dr Ayman al-Zawahiri directed Abu Musab al-Zarqawi, of Al-Qaeda in Iraq, not to attack civilian targets but to focus on the occupation troops. His call seems to have been ignored, or swept away in the increasing tensions of Iraq under occupation.

==== Hajj ====
Every year, Muslims from all over the world attend the hajj pilgrimage in Mecca in Western Saudi Arabia. Shia had complained off and on of mistreatment by the Sunnis who ran Mecca and the hajj ceremonies. Following the advent of Saudi-Wahhabi rule over Mecca in 1924 tensions between Shia and Sunni increased. To the fury of Shia Muslims, the Wahhabi Sunnis demolished domes in the cemetery of Al-Baqi, near the Medina, "the reputed resting place of the Prophet Muhammad's daughter Fatima and four of the Twelve Imams". In 1943, a Saudi religious judge ordered the beheading of an Iranian pilgrim "for allegedly defiling the Great Mosque with excrement" smuggled into "the mosque in his pilgrim's garment". Saudi public opinion considered the crime unsurprising and the punishment just, but the Iranians were furious and demanded payment of an indemnity. Tensions lowered again during the 1960s, when pious/tradionalist Muslims set aside differences in the face of the rising popularity of Nasser's leftist Arab nationalism. Pilgrims from Iran (mostly Shia) rose in number from 12,000 in 1961 to 57,000 in 1972.

In 1987, about seven years after the Iranian revolution, Mecca became a site "of unprecedented carnage" when demonstrating Shia Iranian pilgrims clashed with Saudi security forces and over four hundred were killed. The Saudis and their supporters claimed violent Iranian demonstrators crushed themselves to death in a stampede of their own making. The Iranians and their sympathizers claimed the Saudis had conspired to provoke and then shoot Iranian pilgrims. The pilgrimage to Mecca, where violence is forbidden, had itself become a point of confrontation between rival visions of Islam.

=== Lebanon ===
Though sectarian tensions in Lebanon were at their height during the Lebanese Civil War, the Shia–Sunni relations were not the main conflict of the war. The Shia party of Hezbollah emerged in Lebanon during the Lebanese Civil War as one of the strongest forces following the Israeli withdrawal in the year 2000, and the collapse of the South Lebanese Army in the South. The tensions blew into a limited warfare between Shia dominated and Sunni dominated political alliances in 2008.

With the eruption of the Syrian Civil War, tensions increased between the Shia-affiliated Alawites and Sunnis of Tripoli, erupting twice into deadly violence—in June 2011, and the second time in February 2012. The Syrian war has affected Hezbollah, which was once lauded by both Sunnis and Shi'ites for its battles against Israel, but now has lost support from many Sunnis for its military assistance to Syrian President Bashar al-Assad.

The bombings are thought to be in retaliation for a large car bomb which detonated on 15 August 2013 and killed at least 24 and wounded hundreds in a part of Beirut controlled by the Hezbollah

=== Jordan ===
Although the country of Jordan is 95% Sunni and has not seen any Shia–Sunni fighting within, it has played a part in the recent Shia-Sunni strife. It is the home country of anti-Shia insurgent Raed Mansour al-Banna, who died perpetrating one of Iraq's worst suicide bombings in the city of Al-Hillah. Al-Banna killed 125 Shia and wounded another 150 in the 2005 Al Hillah bombing of a police recruiting station and adjacent open air market. In March 2005 Salt, al-Banna's home town, saw a three-day wake for al-Banna who Jordanian newspapers and celebrants proclaimed a martyr to Islam, which by definition made the Shia victims "infidels whose murder was justified." Following the wake Shia mobs in Iraq attacked the Jordanian embassy on 20 March 2005. Ambassadors were withdrawn from both countries. All this resulted despite the strong filial bonds, ties of commerce, and traditional friendship between the two neighboring countries.

=== Egypt ===
According to Pew, roughly 99% of Egyptian Muslims regarded themselves as Sunni Muslims. others put the number of Shia somewhere between 800,000 to about two to three million. The Syrian Civil War has brought on an increase in anti-Shia rhetoric, and what Human Rights Watch states is "anti-Shia hate speech by Salafis". In 2013 a mob of several hundred attacked a house in the village of Abu Musallim near Cairo, dragging four Shia worshipers through the street before lynching them.

=== Yemen ===
Muslims in Yemen include the majority Shafi'i (Sunni) and the minority Zaidi (Shia). Zaidi are sometimes called "Fiver Shia" instead of Twelver Shia because they recognize the first four of the Twelve Imams but accept Zayd ibn Ali as their "Fifth Imām" rather than his brother Muhammad al-Baqir. Shia–Sunni conflict in Yemen involves the Houthi insurgency in northern Yemen.

Both Shia and Sunni dissidents in Yemen have similar complaints about the government—cooperation with the American government and an alleged failure to following Sharia law—but it's the Shia who have allegedly been singled out for government crackdown.

During and after the US-led invasion of Iraq, members of the Zaidi-Shia community protested after Friday prayers every week outside mosques, particularly the Grand Mosque in Sana'a, during which they shouted anti-US and anti-Israeli slogans, and criticised the government's close ties to America. These protests were led by ex-parliament member and Imam, Bader Eddine al-Houthi. In response the Yemeni government has implemented a campaign to crush to the Zaidi-Shia rebellion" and harass journalists.

These latest measures come as the government faces a Sunni rebellion with a similar motivation to the Zaidi discontent.

A March 2015 suicide bombing of two mosques (used mainly by supporters of the Zaidi Shia-led Houthi rebel movement), in the Yemeni capital of Sanaa, killed at least 137 people and wounded 300. The Sunni Islamic State of Iraq and the Levant movement claimed responsibility, issuing a statement saying: "Let the polytheist Houthis know that the soldiers of the Islamic State will not rest until we have uprooted them." Both the Sunni al-Qaeda and "Islamic State" consider Shia Muslims to be heretics.

=== Bahrain ===
The small Persian Gulf island state of Bahrain has a sizeable Shia minority. The ruling Sunni Al Khalifa family is a constitutional monarchy, with the Sunnis dominating the ruling class and military and disproportionately represented in the business and landownership. According to the CIA World Factbook, Al Wefaq the largest Shia political society, won the largest number of seats in the elected chamber of the legislature. However, Shia discontent has resurfaced in recent years with street demonstrations and occasional low-level violence." Bahrain has many disaffected unemployed youths and many have protested Sheikh Hamad bin Isa Al Khalifa's efforts to create a parliament as merely a "cooptation of the effendis", i.e. traditional elders and notables. Bahrain's 2002 election was widely boycotted by Shia. Mass demonstrations have been held in favor of full-fledged democracy in March and June 2005, against an alleged insult to Ayatollah Khamenei in July 2005.

=== Pakistan ===
Pakistan's citizens have had serious Shia-Sunni discord. Almost 80–90% of Pakistan's Muslim population is Sunni, with 10–20% being Shia, but this Shia minority forms the second largest Shia population of any country, larger than the Shia majority in Iraq.

Until recently Shia–Sunni relations have been cordial, and a majority of people of both sects participated in the creation the state of Pakistan in the 1940s. Despite the fact that Pakistan is a Sunni majority country, Shia have been elected to top offices and played an important part in the country's politics. Several top Pakistani military and political figures such as General Muhammad Musa, and Pakistan's President Yahya Khan were Shia, as well as Former President Asif Ali Zardari was a Shia. There are many intermarriages between Shia and Sunnis in Pakistan.

However, from 1987 to 2007, "as many as 4,000 people are estimated to have died" in Shia-Sunni sectarian fighting in Pakistan", another estimate is nearly 4,000 people have been killed and 6,800 injured from the beginning of 2000 to 2013.

Amongst the culprits blamed for the killing are Al-Qaeda working "with local sectarian groups" to kill what they perceive as Shia apostates, and "foreign powers ... trying to sow discord." Most violence takes place in the largest province of Punjab and the country's commercial and financial capital, Karachi. There have also been conflagrations in the provinces of Khyber Pakhtunkhwa, Balochistan and Azad Kashmir, with several hundreds of Shia killed in Balochistan killed since 2008. Shia have responded to attacks creating a classic vicious cycle of "outrages and vengeance".

Arab states especially Saudi Arabia and GCC states have been funding extremist Deobandi Sunnis and Wahhabis in Pakistan, since the Afghan Jihad. Whereas Iran has been funding Shia militant groups such as Sipah-e-Muhammad Pakistan, resulting in tit-for-tat attacks on each other. Pakistan has become a battleground between Saudi Arabia-funded Deobandi Sunni and Wahhabis and Iran-funded Shia resulting in the deaths of thousands of innocent Muslims.

==== Background ====
Some see a precursor of Pakistani Shia–Sunni strife in the April 1979 execution of deposed President Zulfikar Ali Bhutto on questionable charges by Islamic fundamentalist General Muhammad Zia-ul-Haq. Ali Bhutto was Shia, Zia ul-Haq a Sunni.

Zia-ul-Haq's Islamization that followed was resisted by Shia who saw it as "Sunnification" as the laws and regulations were based on Sunni fiqh. In July 1980, 25,000 Shia protested the Islamization laws in the capital Islamabad. Further exacerbating the situation was the dislike between Shia leader Imam Khomeini and General Zia ul-Haq.

Shia formed student associations and a Shia party, Sunni began to form sectarian militias recruited from Deobandi and Ahl-i Hadith madrasahs. Preaching against the Shia in Pakistan was cleric Israr Ahmed. Manzoor Nomani, a senior Indian cleric with close ties to Saudi Arabia published a book entitled Iranian Revolution: Imam Khomeini and Shiism. The book, which "became the gospel of Deobandi militants" in the 1980s, attacked Khomeini and argued the excesses of the Islamic revolution were proof that Shiism was not the doctrine of misguided brothers, but beyond the Islamic pale.

Anti-Shia groups in Pakistan include the Lashkar-e-Jhangvi and Sipah-e-Sahaba Pakistan, offshoots of the Jamiat Ulema-e-Islam (JUI). The groups demand the expulsion of all Shia from Pakistan and have killed hundreds of Pakistani Shia between 1996 and 1999. As in Iraq they "targeted Shia in their holy places and mosques, especially during times of communal prayer." From January to May 1997, Sunni terror groups assassinated 75 Shia community leaders "in a systematic attempt to remove Shia from positions of authority." Lashkar-e-Jhangvi has declared Shia to be "American agents" and the "near enemy" in global jihad.

An example of an early Shia–Sunni fitna shootout occurred in Kurram, one of the tribal agencies of the Northwest Pakistan, where the Pushtun population was split between Sunnis and Shia. In September 1996 more than 200 people were killed when a gun battle between teenage Shia and Sunni escalated into a communal war that lasted five days. Women and children were kidnapped and gunmen even executed out-of-towners who were staying at a local hotel.

"Over 80,000 Pakistani Islamic militants have trained and fought with the Taliban since 1994. They form a hardcore of Islamic activists, ever-ready to carry out a similar Taliban-style Islamic revolution in Pakistan.", according to Pakistani journalist Ahmed Rashid.

=== Afghanistan ===
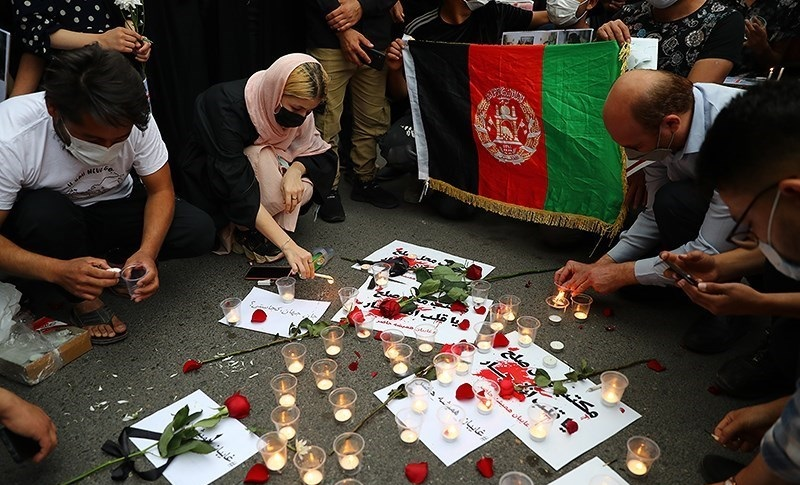
Gathering outside Afghan embassy in Tehran to condemn the 2021 Kabul school bombing

The Shia Hazara minority in Afghanistan has regularly faced violence and discrimination based on their ethnic and religious identity. More than half of the Hazara population was massacred by the Emirate of Afghanistan between 1888 and 1893, and their persecution has occurred various times across previous decades.

Shia–Sunni strife in Pakistan is strongly intertwined with that in Afghanistan. The anti-Shia Afghan Taliban regime helped anti-Shia Pakistani groups and vice versa. Lashkar-e-Jhangvi and Sipah-e-Sahaba Pakistan, have sent thousands of volunteers to fight with the Taliban regime and "in return the Taliban gave sanctuary to their leaders in the Afghan capital of Kabul."

Shia–Sunni strife inside of Afghanistan has been between the Sunni Taliban and Shia Afghans, primarily the Hazara ethnic group—a function of the puritanical religious character of the Taliban and their "traditional Pashtun biases against Shias".

In 1998 more than 8,000 noncombatants were killed when the Taliban attacked Mazar-i-Sharif and Bamiyan where many Hazaras live. Some of the slaughter was indiscriminate, but many were Shia targeted by the Taliban. Taliban commander and governor Mullah Niazi banned prayer at Shia mosques and expressed takfir of the Shia in a declaration from Mazar's central mosque:

Last year you rebelled against us and killed us. From all your homes you shot at us. Now we are here to deal with you. The Hazaras are not Muslims and now we have to kill Hazaras. You must either accept to be Muslims or leave Afghanistan. Wherever you go, we will catch you. If you go up we will pull you down by your feet; if you hide below, we will pull you up by your hair.

Assisting the Taliban in the murder of Iranian diplomatic and intelligence officials at the Iranian Consulate in Mazar were "several Pakistani militants of the anti-Shia, Sipah-e-Sahaba party." There were other pogroms of Shia as well in the first Taliban reign prior to the U.S. invasion.

In 2021 Human Rights Watch warned on a "surge in Islamic State Attacks on Shia" in Afghanistan "that amount to crimes against humanity". Attacks on the Hazara Shia community include

- suicide bombings that killed at least 72 people at the Sayed Abad mosque in Kunduz on 8 October 2021,
- a bombing that killed at least 63 people at the Bibi Fatima mosque in Kandahar on 15 October 2021.

In a statement ISIS declared it would target Shia

"in every way, from slaughtering their necks to scattering their limbs... and the news of [ISIS's] attacks...in the temples of the [Shia] and their gatherings is not hidden from anyone, from Baghdad to Khorasan."

The 2021 Kabul school bombing targeted a girls' school in Dashte Barchi, a predominantly Shia Hazara area in western Kabul. Taliban spokesman condemned the attack and held the Islamic State responsible for the attack. Due to its majority Shia population, the Dashte Barchi district was frequently attacked by the Islamic State – Khorasan Province. On 6 September 2022, the Human Rights Watch reported that since the Taliban took over Afghanistan in August 2021, the ISIS–K has claimed responsibility for 13 attacks against Hazaras and has been linked to at least 3 more, killing and injuring at least 700 people. The Islamic State affiliate has repeatedly attacked Hazaras and other religious minorities at mosques, schools, and workplaces.

=== Nigeria ===
In Nigeria—the most populous country in Africa—until recently almost all Muslims were Sunni. As of 2017, estimates of the number of Nigeria's 90–95 million Muslims who are Shia vary from between 20 million (Shia estimate), to less than five million (Sunni estimate) but according to Pew research center, less than 5% of the Muslim population in Nigeria are Shia.

In the 1980s, Ibrahim El-Zakzaky—a Nigerian admirer of the Iranian revolution who lived in Iran for some years and converted to Shia Islam—established the Islamic Movement of Nigeria. The movement has established "more than 300 schools, Islamic centers, a newspaper, guards and a 'martyrs' foundation'". Its network is similar to that of Hezbollah in Lebanon, with a focus on Iran, its Supreme Leader, and fighting America as the enemy of Islam. According to a former U.S. State Department specialist on Nigeria, Matthew Page, the Islamic Movement receives "about $10,000 a month" in Iranian funding. Many of the converted are poor Muslims.

The Shia campaign has clashed with Saudi Arabian, which also funds religious centers, school, and trains students and clerics, but as part of an effort to spread its competing Wahabbi interpretation of Islam. According to Wikileaks, "Saudi cables" released in 2015 "reveal concern" about "Iran-driven Shiite expansion from Mali, Mauritania, Burkina Faso and Nigeria" to Shia Islam has taken place in Nigeria since the Iranian Revolution.

Shia Muslims protest that they have been persecuted by the Nigerian government. In 1998 Nigerian President General Sani Abacha accused Ibrahim El-Zakzaky of being a Shia. In December 2015 the Nigerian government alleged that the Islamic Movement attempted to kill Nigeria's army chief-of-staff. In retaliation, troops killed more than 300 Shias in the city of Zaria. Hundreds of El-Zakzaky's followers were also arrested. As of 2019, El-Zakzaky was still imprisoned.

=== South East Asia ===
Islam is the dominant religion in Indonesia, which also has a larger Muslim population than any other country in the world, with approximately 202.9 million identified as Muslim (88.2% of the total population) as of 2009.

The majority adheres to the Sunni Muslim tradition mainly of the Shafi'i madhhab. Around one million are Shias, who are concentrated around Jakarta. In general, the Muslim community can be categorized in terms of two orientations: "modernists," who closely adhere to orthodox theology while embracing modern learning; and "traditionalists," who tend to follow the interpretations of local religious leaders (predominantly in Java) and religious teachers at Islamic boarding schools (pesantren). In Indonesia, in 2015, Sunni clerics denounced the Shia as "heretics", and the mayor of Bogor proposed banning the Shia Ashura holy day. The Shia community (which makes up approximately 1% of Indonesia's Muslims) has also been subject to hate campaigns and intimidation, with fears of this escalating into violence.

Malaysia claims to be a tolerant Islamic state, however since 2010 it has banned the preaching of Shia Islam, with a "particular ferocity" and warns against Shiism with its, "evil and blasphemous beliefs".

=== United States ===
In late 2006 or early 2007, in what journalist Seymour Hersh called The Redirection, the United States changed its policy in the Muslim world, shifting its support from the Shia to the Sunni, with the goal of "containing" Iran and as a by-product bolstering Sunni extremist groups. Richard Engel, who is an NBC News Chief Foreign Correspondent, wrote an article in late 2011 alleging that the United States Government is pro-Sunni and anti-Shia. During the Iraq War, the United States feared that a Shiite-led, Iran-friendly Iraq could have major consequences for American national security. However, nothing can be done about this as Iraq's Shiite government were democratically elected. Shadi Bushra of Stanford University wrote that the United States' support of the Sunni monarchy during the Bahraini uprising is the latest in a long history of US support to keep the Shias in check. The United States fears that Shiite rule in the Persian Gulf will lead to anti-US and anti-Western sentiment as well as Iranian influence in the Arab majority states. One analyst told CNN that the US strategy on putting pressure on Iran by arming its Sunni neighbors is not a new strategy for the United States.

=== Europe ===
In Europe Shia-Sunni acrimony is part of life for tens of millions of Muslims immigrants in Europe.

=== Australia ===
Conflict between religious groups in the Middle East have spread to the Australian Muslim community and within Australian schools.

=== ISIL and the 2013–2017 war in Iraq ===
Growing out of the 2003 US invasion of Iraq and overthrow of Iraqi government of Saddam Hussein, a Salafi jihadi extremist militant group led by Sunni Arabs from Iraq and Syria, developed an insurgency that by March 2015 had control over territory in Iraq and Syria occupied by ten million people. It proclaimed itself a worldwide caliphate, with religious, political, and military authority over Muslims worldwide. and dubbed itself the Islamic State (الدولة الإسلامية, ad-Dawlah al-Islāmiyah), but by December 2017, it controlled just 2% of the territory it had at the peak of its expansion, and had been driven underground in Iraq.

In the few years of its success, it was responsible for human rights abuses and war crimes (United Nations), and ethnic cleansing on a "historic scale" (Amnesty International), particularly of Shia Muslims. According to Shia rights watch, in 2014 ISIS forces killed over 1,700 Shia civilians at Camp Speicher in Tikrit Iraq, and 670 Shia prisoners at the detention facility on the outskirts of Mosul. In June 2014, after ISIS had "seized vast territories" in western and northern Iraq, there were "frequent accounts of fighters' capturing groups of people and releasing the Sunnis while the Shiites are singled out for execution", according to The New York Times. ISIS used a list of questions to "tell whether a person is a Sunni or a Shiite"—What is your name? Where do you live? How do you pray? What kind of music do you listen to?

After the collapse of the Iraqi army and capture of the city of Mosul by ISIS in June 2014, the "most senior" Shia spiritual leader based in Iraq, the Grand Ayatollah Ali al-Sistani, who had been known as "pacifist" in his attitudes, issued a fatwa calling for jihad against ISIS and its Sunni allies, which was seen by the Shia militias as a "de facto legalization of the militias' advance". In Qatari another Shiite preacher, Nazar al-Qatari, "put on military fatigues to rally worshipers after evening prayers," calling on them to fight against "the slayers of Imams Hasan and Hussein" (the second and third Imams of Shia history) and for Iran's supreme leader Ayatollah Ali Khamenei.

Shia militias fighting ISIS have also been accused of atrocities. Human Rights Watch has accused government-backed Shia militias of kidnapping and killing scores of Sunni civilians in 2014.

==== Reduced to terror campaigns ====
By 2019, the group resorted increasingly to terror bombings and insurgency operations, using its scattered underground networks of Sleeper Cells across regions in the Middle East and various offshoots and adherents.

According to military.com, as of May 2023, the Islamic State's Khorasan province, (ISIS-K), has become "the new boogeyman in the Middle East". CNN also writes that "new data" shows that at least in Afghanistan, the "threat from ISIS is growing". Although the Shia – in particular the ethnic Hazaras – are just one of the targets of ISIS-K, (along with symbolic targets, foreigners, the ruling Taliban itself), they have been targeted, for example in September 2022, when an educational facility, in "a Shiite area" of the Afghan capital of Kabul, was suicide bombed, killing 53 teenage students and injuring 110.

== Unity efforts ==
In a special interview broadcast on Al Jazeera on 14 February 2007, former Iranian president and chairman of the Expediency Discernment Council of Iran, Ayatollah Akbar Hashemi Rafsanjani and highly influential Sunni scholar Yusuf al-Qaradawi, "stressed the impermissibility of the fighting between the Sunnis and the Shi'is" and the need to "be aware of the conspiracies of the forces of hegemony and Zionism which aim to weaken [Islam] and tear it apart in Iraq."

Rafsanjani asked "more than once who started" the inter-Muslim killing in Iraq. Al-Qaradawi denied Rafsanjani's statement that he knew where "those arriving to Iraq to blow Shi'i shrines up are coming from."

=== Saudi–Iran summit ===
In a milestone for the two countries' relations, on 3 March 2007 King Abdullah of Saudi Arabia and President Mahmoud Ahmadinejad held an extraordinary summit meeting. They displayed mutual warmth with hugs and smiles for cameras and promised "a thaw in relations between the two regional powers but stopped short of agreeing on any concrete plans to tackle the escalating sectarian and political crises throughout the Middle East."

On his return to Tehran, Ahmadinejad declared that:

Both Iran and Saudi Arabia are aware of the enemies' conspiracies. We decided to take measures to confront such plots. Hopefully, this will strengthen Muslim countries against oppressive pressure by the imperialist front.

Saudi officials had no comment about Ahmadinejad's statements, but the Saudi official government news agency did say:

The two leaders affirmed that the greatest danger presently threatening the Islamic nation is the attempt to fuel the fire of strife between Sunni and Shiite Muslims, and that efforts must concentrate on countering these attempts and closing ranks.

Saudi Foreign Minister Prince Saud bin Faisal bin Abdul-Aziz said:

The two parties have agreed to stop any attempt aimed at spreading sectarian strife in the region.

Effort to bring unity between Sunni and Shia Muslims had been attempted by Allama Muhammad Taqi Qummi.

=== Scholarly opinions ===
==== Sunni ====
- Sheikh Mahmoud Shaltut (23 April 1893 – 13 December 1963): In a Fatwa Sheikh Shaltut declared worship according to the doctrine of the Twelve Shia to be valid and recognized the Shiite as an Islamic School.
- Muhammad Sayyid Tantawy (28 October 1928 – 10 March 2010): "I think that anyone who believes that there is no god but Allah and that Muhammad is his Messenger is definitely a Muslim. Therefore, we have been supporting, for a long time, through Al-Azhar, many calls for the reconciliation of Islamic schools of thought. Muslims should work on becoming united, and protecting themselves from denominational sectarian fragmentation. There are no Shiites and no Sunni. We are all Muslims. Regretfully; the passions and prejudices that some resort to, are the reason behind the fragmentation of the Islamic nation."
- Sheikh Mohammed al-Ghazali (22 September 1917 – 9 March 1996): "It is the duty of all Muslims to unite against enemies of Islam and their propaganda".
- Sheikh Abd al-Majid Salim stated in a letter he sent to Ayatollah Borujerdi: "The first thing that becomes obligatory to scholars, Shia or Sunni, is removing dissension from the minds of Muslims."
- Vasel Nasr, the Grand Mufti of Egypt (Mufti from 1996 to 2002): "We ask Allah to create unity among Muslims and remove any enmity, disagreement and contention in the ancillaries of Fiqh between them."

==== Shiite ====
- Ayatollah Seyyed Hossein Borujerdi (23 March 1875 – 30 March 1961) sent a letter to Sheikh Abd al-Majid Salim, the Grand Mufti of Sunnis and former Chancellor of Al-Azhar University and wrote: "I ask Almighty Allah to change ignorance, separation and distribution among different Islamic Schools to each other, to the actual knowledge and kindness and solidarity."
- Ayatollah Ruhollah Khomeini (17 May 1900 – 3 June 1989): "We are oneness with Sunni Muslims. We are their brothers" and "It is obligatory for all Muslims that maintain unity."
- Ayatollah Seyyed Ali Khamenei (19 April 1939 – 28 February 2026) said in a Fatwa about creating dissension: "In addition to dissension is contrary to the Qur'an and Sunnah, this weakens Muslims. So, creating dissension is forbidden (Haram)."
- Ayatollah Ali al-Sistani (born 10 August 1930), in answer to the question "is anyone who says Shahadah, prays and follow one of the Islamic Schools, a Muslim?", Sistani replied: "Every one who says Shahadah, acts as you describe and does not have enmity towards Ahl al-Bayt, is Muslim."

== See also ==
- Amman Message
- Anti-Shi'ism
- Criticism of Twelver Shia Islam
- Geosectarianism
- Glossary of Islam
- Index of Islam-related articles
- International Islamic Unity Conference (Iran)
- Islam in Iran
- Iran-Saudi Arabia proxy conflict
- Kharijite
- Organisation of Islamic Cooperation
- Outline of Islam
- Rafida
- Safavid conversion of Iran to Shia Islam
- Shia Muslims in the Arab world
- Sunni fatwas on Shias
- The World Forum for Proximity of Islamic Schools of Thought
- Sufi–Salafi relations
- Catholic-Protestant relations – One of the Christian counterparts
- Catholic-Eastern Orthodox relations – One of the Christian counterparts

== Sources ==
- Gerhard Böwering, ed. (2013). The Princeton Encyclopedia of Islamic Political Thought. Princeton University Press. ISBN 978-0-691-13484-0.
- Kazemzadeh, Firuz (1991). "Iranian relations with Russia and the Soviet Union, to 1921". In Avery, Peter; Hambly, Gavin; Melville, Charles (eds.). The Cambridge History of Iran. Vol. 7. Cambridge University Press. ISBN 978-0-521-20095-0.
- Kepel, Gilles (2002). Jihad: The Trail of Political Islam. Harvard University Press. ISBN 9780674010901. "Jihad: The Trail of Political Islam."
- Mikaberidze, Alexander, ed. (2011). "Russo-Iranian Wars". Conflict and Conquest in the Islamic World: A Historical Encyclopedia, Volume 1. ABC-CLIO. ISBN 978-1-59884-336-1.
- Nasr, Vali (2006). The Shia Revival : How Conflicts Within Islam Will Shape the Future. Norton.
