= Mohamed Faisal =

Mohamed Faisal may refer to:

- Mohamed Faisal (footballer)
- Mohamed Faisal (actor)
- Mohamed Faisal (politician)

== See also ==
- Mohammad Faisal (disambiguation)
