= 2018 Chabahar suicide bombing =

2018 terrorist attack in Chabahar city, Iran

Chabahar suicide bombing
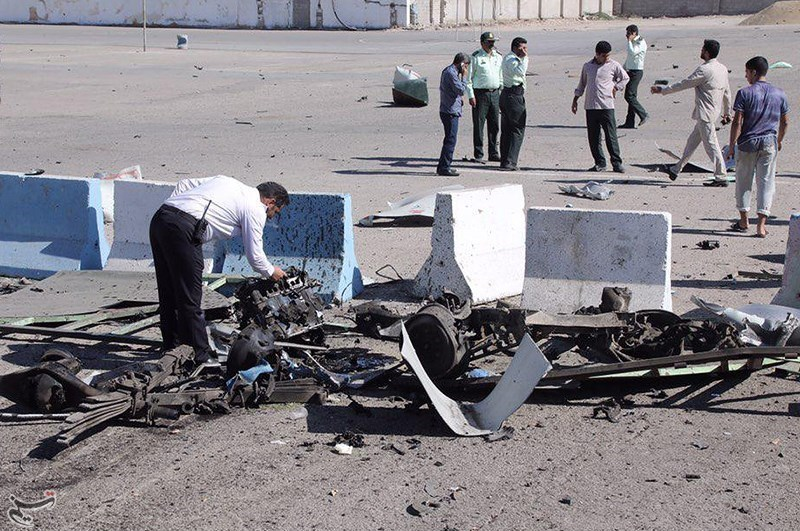
- The remains of the suicide car
- Location: Chabahar, Sistan-Baluchestan, Iran
- Date: 7 December 2018 (UTC+3½)
- Target: Police headquarters
- Attack type: Suicide bombing
- Deaths: 2 (+1 attacker)
- Injuries: 48
- Perpetrator: Ansar Al-Furqan

A suicide car bombing in Iran occurred on 6 December 2018 near a police station in Chabahar city, Sistan and Baluchestan Province. The attack left at least two policemen killed and 48 others injured, among them women and children.

Iranian media has accused the Ansar Al-Furqan group a Sunni jihadi group, of being behind the incident. Ansar Al-Furqan took responsibility for the attack. Suicide bombings are rare in Iran.

== Bombing ==
A suicide bomber drove a pickup truck loaded with explosives towards a Law Enforcement Police's station in Chabahar city. Police officers blocked the vehicle and started shooting at the driver, who then blew the car up near the station. According to France 24, as soon as the car bomb was detonated, gunmen tried assaulting the Police Headquarters, but they were killed by Iranian security forces.

At least two policemen killed and 48 others injured as a result of the bombing. The injured people, among them women and children, consisted of 10 military personnel and 32 civilian, 28 of whom were immediately discharged from the hospital after outpatient treatment and 8 others underwent surgery.

== Aftermath ==
According to the police chief Hossein Ashtari, 10 people, suspected of having links to the bombing incident are detained and more cases are identified and being prosecuted.

Javad Zarif, Iran's Foreign Minister, accused a foreign power of involvement and did not name a specific country. "Foreign-backed terrorists kill and wound innocents in Chabahar. As we've made clear in the past, such crimes won’t go unpunished," Zarif said on Twitter. Indian Foreign Minister described the attack as "despicable terrorist attack" and asked for bringing the perpetrators to the justice. Pakistani Foreign Office Spokesman Mohammad Faisal condemned the attack in a Twitter message.

== Analysis ==
According to the Tasnim News Agency, the aim of the attack was to destabilize the area prior to the meeting of the committee pursuing the Chabahar Agreement.

== See also ==
- 2010 Chabahar suicide bombing
