= 2010 Chabahar suicide bombing =

2010 terrorist attack in Iran

Coordinates: 25°17′01″N 60°37′25″E

Chabahar suicide bombing
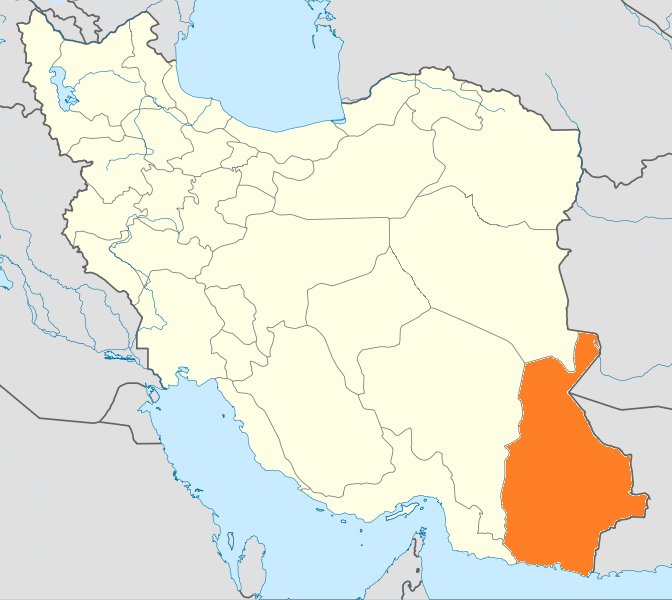
- Sistan and Baluchistan Province highlighted within Iran
- Location: Chabahar, Sistan-Baluchestan, Iran
- Date: 14 December 2010 (UTC+3½)
- Target: Shia worshippers
- Attack type: Suicide bombings
- Deaths: 39
- Injuries: 100+
- Perpetrator: Jundullah

A suicide bombing incident occurred on December 14, 2010, by two suicide bombers, who blew themselves up in a crowded Shia Muslim mourning procession in the southeastern Iranian coastal city of Chabahar, outside Imam Husain Mosque. It took place on the day of Tasu'a, when Shiite Muslims gathered to commemorate the martyrdom of Husayn ibn Ali, the grandson of Muhammad through his daughter Fatima and his successor Ali ibn Abi Talib. It killed 39 people.

== Bombings ==
The first bomber detonated his explosives outside the Imam Husain Mosque and another one carried out the attacks in the crowd of Shiite worshippers just a day before the Day of Ashura. As per the Governor of Chahbahar, Ali Bateni. The first attacker was killed, however another one was arrested. The arrested suspect was caught after failing to set off his explosives outside the office of Chabahar's governor, according to LA Times.

== Casualties ==
Between 38 and 39 worshippers were killed in the blast, and more than 100 were injured. According to BBC, it is feared that many women and children were among the worshippers that were killed. The number of people who died had reached 41, according to The Guardian.

== Suspects ==
Al Arabiya reported Jundullah, a Sunni extremist rebel group, claimed responsibility for the bombing. Chahbahar's Governor Ali Bateni said the mastermind behind the attacks was arrested. According to France 24, Alaeddin Borujerdi, the parliament's foreign committee head, claimed that the U.S and Britain were sponsors of the attack.

== See also ==
- 2018 Chabahar suicide bombing
- June 2017 Tehran terror attacks
- Terrorism in Iran
- Shi'a-Sunni relations
