= Origin of Shia Islam =

Shia Islam originated as a response to questions of Islamic religious leadership which became manifest as early as the death of Muhammad in 632 CE. The issues involved not only whom to appoint as the successor to Muhammad, but also what attributes a true successor should have. Sunnis regarded Caliphs as temporary leaders (originally elected by general agreement, though later the hereditary principle became the norm). To the Shiite, however, the question of succession is a matter of designation of an individual (Ali) through divine command. In the same way, Shias believed that each Imam designated the next Imam by the leave of God. So within Shia Islam it makes no difference to the Imam's position whether he is chosen as a Caliph or not.

Historians dispute the origin of Shia Islam, with many Western scholars positing that Shiism began as a political faction rather than as a religious movement. (Note: See: Lapidus p. 47, Holt p. 72) However, Jafri disagrees, considering this concept or religious-political separation as an anachronistic application of a Western concept. Sunnis, on the other hand, often claim that Shiite beliefs only first formed under the scheming of Abdullah ibn Saba'; Sunnis reject the idea that Ali followed any beliefs that were contrary to the rest of the Sahaba.

== Shia View ==
Shia Islam began when Abu Bakr, Umar and Abu Ubaydah al Jarrah offered each other the helpers (ansar) despite the announcement of Ghadir Khumm where Ali was declared master of the believers. Ali and his supporters stayed in his house then Abu Bakr sent Umar to threaten those inside by attempting to burn the house. After a confrontation Ali eventually pledged allegiance to Abu Bakr. Ali would remind the companions of the tradition of Ghadir over 10 years later in the courtyard of the mosque in Kufa in a tradition known as Yawm al Ruhba. Shi’i sources are clear about the collusion of the above individuals as well Sunni ones, for example where Umar announces shortly before his death that he would elect Abu Ubaydah or Salim (one of the first people to pledge allegiance to Abu Bakr) if they were still alive. Therefore the Sunni leadership doctrine was really a reaction by some individuals to Ali being announced as their master.

These personalities are known by some as the people of the contract (ahl al-‘Uqd):

It was narrated that Qais bin 'Ubad said:

"While I was in the Masjid in the first row, a man pulled me from behind and moved me aside, and took my place. By Allah, I could not focus on my prayer, then when he left I saw that it was Ubayy bin Ka'b. He said: '0 boy, may Allah protect you from harm. This is what the Prophet instructed us to do, to stand directly behind him.' Then he (Ubayy) turned to face the Qiblah and said: 'Doomed are Ah1 Al-'Uqd, by the Lord of the Ka'bah! - three times.'Then he said: 'By Allah, I am not sad for them, but I am sad for the people whom they have misled.' I said: '0 Abu Ya'qub, what do you mean by Ah1 Al-'Uqd?' He said: 'The rulers."'

From then on the different Shia groups developed different Imamate theories with the most popular current form alleging having 12 imams with the last one in occultation, which means he has been hidden from the view of the people until the end of time. Other Shia groups do not limit the number of imams and instead encourage that the imam be a just and knowledgeable leader.

== Starting point ==
Shiism began for the first time with a reference made to the partisans of Ali the first leader of the Ahl al-Bayt (Household of the prophet). In the early years of Islamic history there was no "orthodox" Sunni or "heretical" Shiite, but rather of two points of view that were drifting steadily until became manifest as early as the death of Muhammad the prophet of Islam.

On the death of Muhammad, the prophet of Islam, in an assembly known as the Saqifah a group of Muhajirun negotiated with the Ansar regarding the case for the acceptance of Abu Bakr as the successor to the prophet, Muhammad who was to be washed and buried. A distinguished absentee of this gathering was Ali the cousin and son-in-law of the prophet. There were some people who on view of some statement made by Muhammad in his lifetime believed that Ali should have taken the position, not only as a temporal head (Caliph) but also as spiritual head(Imam). According to the Sunni sources, Ali "was a valued counselor of the caliphs who preceded him"; Umar is, therefore, reported by some of the important early Sunni authors as saying: "Had there not been Ali, 'Umar would have perished."

Jafri, on the other hand, quotes Veccia Vaglieri as saying "Ali was included in the council of the caliphs, but although it is probable that he was asked for advice on legal matters in view of his excellent knowledge of the Quran and the Sunnah, it is extremely doubtful whether his advice was accepted by Umar, who had been a ruling power even during the caliphate of Abu Bakr." And that is why Ali's decisions rarely find a place in the later developed Sunni schools of law, while Umar's decisions find common currency among them. According to some sources, (Note: See: *Lapidus p. 47. Holt p. 72.) the Shiites are believed to have started as a political party and developed into a religious movement, influencing Sunnis and producing a number of important sects. Other scholars argue Western scholarship that views Shi'ism as a political movement is factually incorrect. According to Jafri, however, the origin of shiite is not merely the result of political partisanship concerning the leadership of Ummah. In his book the origin of shiite islam he points out that those who emphasize the political nature of Shi'ism are "perhaps too eager to project the modern Western notion of the separation of church and state back into seventh century", since such an approach "implies the spontaneous appearance of Shi'ism rather than its gradual emergence and development". Jafri says Islam is basically religious because Muhammad was appointed and sent by God to deliver His message, and political because of the circumstances in which it arose and grew. In the same way Shi'ism, in its inherent nature, has always been both religious and political. In one occasion, for example, when the Shura after Umar proposed that they would give him the Caliphate on condition that he acted according to Quran, Sunnah of Muhammad, and precedents established by the first two caliphs, he refused to accept the last condition.

In another occasion when Ali's Partisans asked him to play politic and reaffirm Muawiyah I as the Governor of Syria and sweet-talk him with promises before they could topple him from his position Ali said I have no doubt that what you advise is best for this life, he retorted. But I will have nothing to do with such underhanded schemes, neither yours nor Muawiya's. I do not compromise my faith by cheating, nor do I give contemptible men any say in my command. I will never confirm Muawiya as governor of Syria, not even for two days. Ali accepted the political realities of his day, however, believed he was better qualified for the caliphate, which is evidence from the historic exposition of Ali, known as Sermon of the roar of a camel.

According to Shiite, Ali declined to make use of the military support offered to him by Abu Sufyan ibn Harb to fight Abu Bakr. At the same time, however, he did not recognize Abu Bakr and refused to pay him homage for six months.

== Imamate the Distinctive Institution of Shia Islam ==
The distinctive institution of Shi’ism is the Imamate and the question of the Imamate is inseparable from that of walayat, or the esoteric function of interpreting the inner mysteries of the Quran and the Shari’ah. Both Shia and Sunni are in agreement over the two functions of prophet hood: to reveal God's law to men, and to guide men toward God. However, while Sunnis believe that both have come to an end with the death of Muhammad, Shia believe that whereas legislation ended, the function of guiding and "explaining divine law continued through the line of Imams." In Shia theology, thus, God does not guide via authoritative texts (i.e. the Qur'an and Hadith) only but also guides through some specially equipped individuals known as Imams. This constitution, Shia says, is not limited to Islam, but each great messenger of God had two covenants, one concerning the next prophet who would eventually come, and one regarding the immediate successor, the Imam. For example, Sam was an imam for Noah, Ishmael was an Imam for Abraham, Aaron or Joshua for Moses, Simon, John and all the disciples for Jesus, and Ali and his descendants for Muhammad. It is narrated from the sixth imam, Ja'far al-Sadiq who had said "where there to remain on the earth but two men, one of them would be the proof of God". The different between apostles (Rasuls), the prophets(Nabi) and the Imams, thus, is described as follows: Rasul sees and hears the angel in awakness and sleep. Nabi hears the angel and sees him while asleep, but does not see him while awake though hears the speech. Imam (muhaddith) is the one who hears the angel in awakness while does not see him in awakness or sleep. According to the fifth Imam, however, this kind of revelation is not the revelation of prophethood but rather like the inspiration (ilham) which came to Mary (mother of Jesus), (Note: Quran, 3:45) the mother of Moses (Note: Quran, 28:7) and to the bee. (Note: Quran, 16:68) Hence the question was not only who the successor to Muhammad was, but also what the attributes of a true successor were.

== Imamate vs Caliphate ==
The very life of Ali and his actions show that he accepted the previous caliphs as understood in the Sunni sense of Caliphate (the ruler and the administrator of the Sharia), but confined the function of Walayah, after the Prophet, to himself. That is why he is respected as the fourth caliph in the Sunni sense and as an Imam in the Shi’ite sense.

Sunnites, on the other hand, reject Imamate on the basis of Quran (Note: Quran, 33:40) which says Muhammad, as the last of the Prophets, was not to be succeeded by any of his family; and that is why God let Muhammad's sons to die in infancy. (Note: See Goldziher, Muhammedanische Studien, II, 105-6; Y. Friedmann, 'Finality of Prophethood in Sunni Islam', JSAI, 7 (1986), 177–215, at 187-9.) And that is why Muhammad did not nominate a successor, as he wanted to leave the succession to be resolved "by the Muslim Community on the basis of the Quranic principle of consultation (Shura)." The question Madelung propose here is that why the family members of Muhammad should not inherit other (other than prophethood) aspects of Muhammad's character such as rule (hukm) wisdom (Hikmah), and the Imamate. Since The Sunnite concept of the "true caliphate" itself defines it as a "succession of the Prophet in every respect except his prophethood". Madelung further asks "If God really wanted to indicate that he should not be succeeded by any of his family, why did He not let his grandsons and other kin die like his sons?"

It is said that one day the Abbasid Caliph Harun al-Rashid questioned the seventh Shiite Imam, Musa al-Kadhim, saying why he had permitted people to call him "Son of Allah's Apostle," while he and his forefathers were Muhammad's daughter's children. And that "the progeny belongs to the male (Ali) and not to the female (Fatimah)". In response al-Kadhim recited the verses Quran, 6:84 and Quran, 6:85 and then asked "Who is Jesus's father, O Commander of the faithful?". "Jesus had no father." Said Harun. Al-kadhim argued that God in these verses had ascribed Jesus to the descendants of the prophets through Mary; "similarly, we have been ascribed to the descendants of the Prophet through our mother Fatimah," Said al-Kadhim. It is related that Harun asked Musa to give him more evidence and proof. Al-Kadhim, thus, recited the verse of Mubahala arguing that "None claims that the Prophet made someone enter under the cloak when he challenged the Christians to a contest of prayer to God (mubahala) except Ali, Fatimah, Hasan, and Husayn. So in the verse: "Our sons" refers to Hasan and Husayn. In one of his long letters to Muawiya I, summoning him to pledge allegiance to him, Hasan ibn Ali made use of the argument of his father, Ali, which the latter had advanced against Abu Bakr after the death of Muhammad. Ali had said: "If Quraysh could claim the leadership over the Ansar on the grounds that the Prophet belonged to Quraysh, then the members of his family, who were the nearest to him in every respect, were better qualified for the leadership of the community."

Mu'awiya's response, to this argument is also interesting, for Muawiyah, while recognizing the excellence of the Muhammad's family, further asserted that he would willingly follow Hasan's request were it not for his own superior experience in governing:"…You are asking me to settle the matter peacefully and surrender, but the situation concerning you and me today is like the one between you [your family] and Abu Bakr after the death of the Prophet…I have a longer period of reign [probably referring to his governorship], and am more experienced, better in policies, and older in age than you. …if you enter into obedience to me now, you will accede to the caliphate after me." Wrote back Muawiyya.

In his book, The Origins and Early Development of Shi’a Islam, Jafri comes to the conclusion that the majority of the Muslims who became known as Sunnis afterwards "placed the religious leadership in the totality of the community (Ahl al-Sunnah wal Jamaah), represented by the Ulama, as the custodian of religion and the exponent of the Quran and the Sunnah of the Prophet, while accepting state authority as binding… A minority of the Muslims, on the other hand, could not find satisfaction for their religious aspirations except in the charismatic leadership from among the people of the house of the Prophet, the Ahl al-Bayt, as the sole exponents of the Quran and the Prophetic Sunnah, although this minority too had to accept the state's authority. This group was called the Shiite."

== Husayn's uprising ==
To Sunnis, Husayn's decision to travel to Iraq was a not mere political adventuring that went wrong, rather it was a decision to uphold the religion of Islam. To uphold the teachings of His Grand Father Prophet Muhammad and to stand against the wrong changes being incorporated in Islam by Yazid I.(Haider) According to Shiite historians, on the other hand, Husayn had "received plenty of warning of the collapse of the shii revolt in Kufa as he approached Iraq." Shiite historians record that on his journey to Kufa when Husayn received grim news from Kufa, he addressed his companions telling that "of the death and destruction that awaited them ahead." At this point, they argue, Husayn could have retired to Medina or at least accepted the offer which was made to him to refuge in the mountain strongholds of the Tayy tribe. But he refused these and even addressed his companions telling them to leave him as he proceed toward Kufa. Jafri, the Shiite historian, writes: "Husayn did not try to organize or mobilize military support, which he easily could have done in the Hijaz, nor did he even try to exploit whatever physical strength was available to him… Is it conceivable that anyone striving for power would ask his supporters to abandon him,… What then did Husayn have in mind? Why was he still heading for Kufa?... According to Jafri it is disappointing that historians have given too much attention "to external aspects of the event of Karbala and has never tried to analyze the inner history and agonizing conflict in Husayn's mind". He points out that Husayn "was aware of the fact that a victory achieved through military strength and might is always temporal, because another stronger power can in course of time bring it down in ruins. But a victory achieved through suffering and sacrifice is everlasting and leaves permanent imprints on man's consciousness… The natural process of conflict and struggle between action and reaction was now at work. That is, Muhammad's progressive Islamic action had succeeded in suppressing Arab conservatism, embodied in heathen pre-Islamic practices and ways of thinking. But in less than thirty years' time this Arab conservatism revitalized itself as a forceful reaction to challenge Muhammad's action once again. The forces of this reaction had already moved into motion with the rise of Muawiya, but the succession of Yazid was a clear sign that the reactionary forces had mobilized themselves and had now re-emerged with full vigor. The strength of this reaction, embodied in Yazid's character, was powerful enough to suppress or at least deface Muhammad's action. Islam was now, in the thinking of Husayn, in dire need of reactivation of Muhammad's action against the old Arabian reaction, and thus a complete shake-up. " Jafri continue to say that "Husayn's acceptance of Yazid, with the latter's openly reactionary attitude against Islamic norms, would not have meant merely a political arrangement, as had been the case with Hasan and Muawiya, but an endorsement of Yazid's character and way of life as well." He then comes to the conclusion that Husayn "realized that mere force of arms would not have saved Islamic action and consciousness. To him it needed a shaking and jolting of hearts and feelings. This, he decided, could only be achieved through sacrifice and sufferings." "for those who", he writes, "fully appreciate the heroic deeds and sacrifices of, for example, Socrates and Joan of Arc, both of whom embraced death for their ideals, and above all of the great sacrifice of Jesus Christ for the redemption of mankind. It is in this light that we should read Husayn's replies to those well-wishers who advised him not to go to Iraq. It also explains why Husayn took with him his women and children, though advised by Ibn Abbas that should he insist on his project, at least he should not take his family with him." "Aware of the extent of the brutal nature of the reactionary forces, Husayn knew that after killing him the Umayyads would make his women and children captives and take them all the way from Kufa to Damascus. This caravan of captives of Muhammad's immediate family would publicize Husayn's message and would force the Muslims' hearts to ponder on the tragedy. It would make the Muslims think of the whole affair and would awaken their consciousness." So, according to Gafriii that is exactly what happened. He continue to writes that "Had Husayn not shaken and awakened Muslim consciousness by this method, who knows whether Yazid's way of life would have become standard behavior in the Muslim community, endorsed and accepted by the grandson of the Prophet." Then he arrives to the conclusion that "although after Yazid kingship did prevail in Islam, and though the character and behavior in the personal lives of these kings was not very different from that of Yazid, but the change in thinking which prevailed after the sacrifice of Husayn always served as a line of distinction between Islamic norms and the personal character of the rulers."
