= Martin Kramer =

American-Israeli scholar

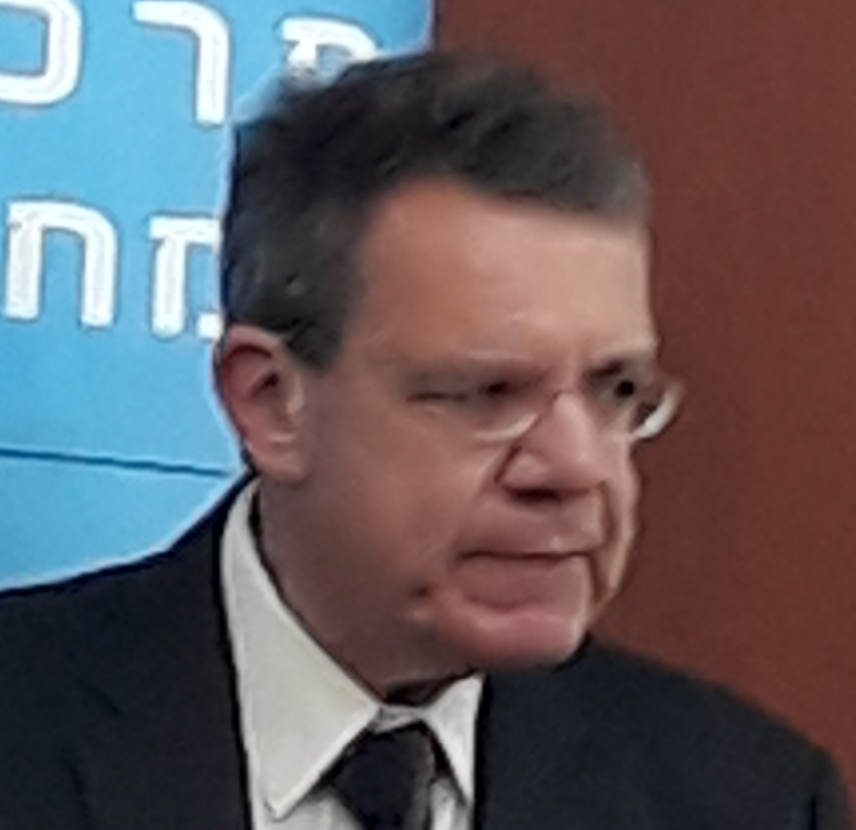
Kramer in 2019

Martin Seth Kramer (Hebrew: מרטין קרמר; born September 9, 1954, Washington, D.C.) is an American-Israeli academic with a focus on the Middle East at Tel Aviv University and the Washington Institute for Near East Policy. His focus is on the history and politics of the Middle East, contemporary Islam, and modern Israel.

Kramer has written for the group Middle East Forum, and has argued that Islam and fundamentalism are innately linked.

== Education ==
Kramer began his undergraduate degree under Itamar Rabinovich in Middle Eastern Studies at Tel Aviv University and completed his BA in Near Eastern Studies from Princeton University. He earned his PhD at Princeton as well, under Fouad Ajami, L. Carl Brown, Charles Issawi, and Bernard Lewis, who directed his thesis. He also received a History MA from Columbia University. He gained a PhD in Near Eastern Studies from Princeton University in 1982.

== Career ==
Kramer is a senior and past editor of the Middle East Forum's Middle East Quarterly. Primarily a scholar of twentieth century Islamist intellectual and political history, Kramer has also published columns in the National Review magazine and on the websites of the History News Network.

== Political involvement ==
Kramer was an early advocate of attacking Saddam Hussein in the wake of 9/11, arguing in December 2001 that regardless of a possible involvement, he posed a threat to the entire Middle East. However, he was critical of the shifting rationale for the war in October 2002, questioning the United States' "tools of social engineering" needed to promote an eventual democracy process in the Arab world.

He was a senior policy adviser on the Middle East to the Rudy Giuliani Presidential Campaign in 2007.

== Critique of Middle Eastern studies ==
=== Ivory Towers on Sand ===
In 2001, the Washington Institute for Near East Policy published Kramer's book Ivory Towers on Sand: The Failure of Middle Eastern Studies in America. In the book (as reported by the New York Times), Kramer argued that Middle East experts "failed to ask the right questions at the right time about Islam. They underestimated its impact in the 1980s; they misrepresented its role in the early 1990s; and they glossed over its growing potential for terrorism against America in the late 1990s. "The book was given positive mentions in The Chronicle of Higher Education and The Washington Post

John L. Esposito accused Kramer of trying to discredit the entire Middle East establishment. Zachary Lockman, professor of modern Middle East history at New York University, admits that Kramer's criticism of Middle East scholars' general failure to anticipate the rise of Islamist movements in the 1970s is well-deserved but maintains that "[o]verall, Kramer’s approach is deeply flawed as a history of Middle East studies as a scholarly field."

=== HR 3077 ===
Kramer was one of the most vocal supporters of HR 3077, a bill in the United States House of Representatives designed to reform area studies in the US. Saree Makdisi argues in a Los Angeles Times op-ed that the bill "poses a profound threat to academic freedom".

== Palestinian population growth controversy ==
At the February 2010 Herzliya Conference in Israel, Kramer caused controversy by advocating for the elimination of Western aid in what he termed "pro-natal subsidies" to Palestinian refugees in Gaza in order to discourage population growth and Islamic radicalization:

Aging populations reject radical agenda and the Middle East is no different. Now eventually, this will happen among the Palestinians, too. But it will happen faster if the West stops providing pro-natal subsidies for Palestinians with refugee status. Those subsidies are one reason why in the ten years, from 1997 to 2007, Gaza’s population grew by an astonishing 40%. At that rate, Gaza’s population will double by 2030 to three million. Israel’s present sanctions on Gaza have a political aim, undermine the Hamas regime, but they also break Gaza’s runaway population growth and there is some evidence that they have. That may begin to crack the culture of martyrdom, which demands a constant supply of superfluous young men.

At the time, he was a National Security Studies Program Visiting Scholar at the Weatherhead Center for International Affairs, Harvard University, and some critics called on Harvard to distance itself from him. Deans at Harvard University's Weatherhead Center for International Affairs rejected these calls, stating, "Accusations have been made that Martin Kramer's statements are genocidal. These accusations are baseless." They found that Kramer's critics "appear not to understand the role of controversy in an academic setting" and rejected any attempts to restrict "fundamental academic freedom." Kramer later referred to the speech as "experimental" and deliberately "provocative."

== Bibliography ==
=== Books ===
- Political Islam (1980) ISBN 0-8039-1435-0
- Islam Assembled (1985) ISBN 0-231-05994-9
- Shi'ism, Resistance, and Revolution (1987) ISBN 0-8133-0453-9
- Hezbollah's Vision of the West (1989) ISBN 0-944029-01-9
- Middle Eastern Lives: The Practice of Biography and Self-Narrative (Contemporary Issues in the Middle East) (1991) ISBN 0-8156-2548-0
- Arab Awakening and Islamic Revival: The Politics of Ideas in the Middle East (1996) ISBN 1-56000-272-7
- The Islamism Debate (1997) ISBN 965-224-024-9
- The Jewish Discovery of Islam (1999) ISBN 965-224-040-0
- Ivory Towers on Sand: The Failure of Middle Eastern Studies in America (2001) ISBN 0-944029-49-3, download
- The War on Error: Israel, Islam, and the Middle East (2016) ISBN 1-4128-6499-2

=== Journal Papers ===
- "The American Interest", Azure magazine, Autumn 2006.
- "Nation and Assassination in the Middle East", Middle East Quarterly, Summer 2004.
- "Coming to Terms: Fundamentalists or Islamists?", Middle East Quarterly, Summer 2003.
- "Policy and the Academy: An Illicit Relationship?", Middle East Quarterly, Winter 2003.

=== Kramer on interpreters of the Middle East ===
- Pape-Kramer debate - a debate involving Robert Pape and Kramer
- Suicide Terrorism in the Middle East: Origins and Response Robert Pape
- Islam Obscured, Kramer on John Esposito
- Stephen Walt's World, a critique of Stephen Walt
- The Arab Nation of Shakib Arslan by Kramer, a review of William L. Cleveland's biography of Shakib Arslan, 31 October 1987
- Albert Pasha: a review of Abdulaziz A. Al-Sudairi's biography of Albert Hourani, 15 June 2002
- Islamist Bubbles, an assessment of Gilles Kepel.
- Arab Pen, English Purse: John Sabunji and Wilfrid Scawen Blunt, a critique of Wilfrid Scawen Blunt by Kramer 31 December 1989
- Ignatieff's Empire, criticism of Michael Ignatieff January 5, 2003
- The Day the Rabbi Rescued Rashid, a critique of Arthur Hertzberg 28 February 2005

=== Kramer on Key Middle Eastern Figures ===
- The Oracle of Hizbullah (Hezbollah): Sayyid Muhammad Husayn (Hussein) Fadlallah

=== Kramer on U.S. and Israeli Policy ===
- What Do the Financial Crisis and US Middle East Policy Have in Common? December 2008.
- Israel's Gaza Strategy January 2009.
- Sanctioning "Resistance" January 2009.

=== Kramer on the Zionist legacy of Martin Luther King Jr. ===
- The MLK Day Bundle 17 January 2021.
- Martin Luther King Jr. and Israel, then and now January 2020, Times of Israel
- In the Words of Martin Luther King Jr. chapter in The War on Error: Israel, Islam, and the Middle East (New Brunswick, NJ:Transaction, 2016), 253-67.
- Where MLK really stood on Israel and the Palestinians 2019. Mosaic Magazine
