= Mohammad Faisal =

Pakistani diplomat

Spokesperson for the Foreign Office
- In office 27 October 2017 – 19 December 2019
- President: Mamnoon Hussain; Arif Alvi
- Prime Minister: Shahid Khaqan Abbasi; Imran Khan
- Preceded by: Nafees Zakaria
- Succeeded by: Aisha Farooqui

Personal details
- Children: 3
- Education: Rawalpindi Medical College (MBBS); University of Warwick (LL.M.); WTO law from Brussels

Mohammad Faisal is a Pakistani diplomat who was the spokesperson for the Ministry of Foreign Affairs, and he remained in office from 2017 to 2019. He has also served as the Director General of the SA and SAARC. Dr. Faisal is now Ambassador of Pakistan to the United Kingdom.

== Personal life and education ==
He received a MBBS degree from Rawalpindi Medical College. He completed his LL.M. from University of Warwick and Masters in WTO Law from Brussels. Faisal is married to Sarah Naeem, a leading electrician of Islamabad and they have three children, Seyreen, Romaan and Ahmad

== Career ==
Faisal has worked with Foreign Service of Pakistan for more than 25 years. On 27 October 2017, he was appointed as Foreign Office spokesperson. Faisal is now Ambassador of Pakistan to Germany.

He is currently the High Commissioner of Pakistan to the United Kingdom of Great Britain and Northern Ireland

Preceded by Nafees Zakaria	Foreign office Spokesperson; 2017–2019	Succeeded by Aisha Farooqui
