= List of wars involving Iran =

This is a list of wars involving the Islamic Republic of Iran, excluding its predecessor states. It is an unfinished historical conspectus.

== Major conflicts ==
Conflict	Iran (and allies)	Opponents	Results	Notes
Iranian Revolution (1978–1979): Part of the Constitutionalization attempts in Iran and the Cold War	Revolutionary Council Other opposition: Confederation of Iranian Students; Islamist Opposition: Combatant Clergy Association; Freedom Movement of Iran; Islamic Association of Students; Islamic Association of Teachers; Islamic Association of Engineers; Islamic Association of Physicians; Islamic Coalition Societies; Fada'iyan-e Islam; Mojahedin; Communist and socialist opposition: National Front; Mojahedin-e-Khalq; Fadaiyan-e-Khalq; Tudeh Party; Sarbedaran; Peykar; Movement of Militant Muslims; Razmandegan; Worker's Way; Komalah; Union of Communist Militants; JAMA; Democratic Party of Iranian Kurdistan	Imperial State of Iran Pro-Shah Groups: Regency Council (Note: Regency Council was practically dissolved on 22 January 1979, when its head resigned to meet Ruhollah Khomeini.); Rastakhiz Party (until 1 November 1978); Imperial Army (Note: Imperial Iranian Army revoked their allegiance to the throne and declared neutrality on 11 February 1979.); Imperial Guard; SAVAK; Shahrbani; Gendarmerie	Revolutionaries' victory	Revolutionaries' victory: Overthrow of Mohammad Reza Pahlavi and the monarchy; End of Pahlavi Iran; Establishment of an Interim Government; Constitution of the Islamic Republic replaced Persian Constitution of 1906 with referendum; Ruhollah Khomeini becomes the Supreme Leader; Iran hostage crisis; Arab League–Iran relations deteriorates. Beginning of the Iran–Iraq War in 1980; Hijab for all women by law; 1979 oil crisis; Massive exile that characterizes a large portion of today's Iranian diaspora; Islamic revival worldwide; International sanctions against Iran; Anti-Americanist regime change, prompting many anti-American riots throughout the Muslim world; Iran designated state sponsor of terrorism; 1979 U.S. embassy burning in Islamabad; Nojeh coup plot; Start of the Iran–Saudi Arabia proxy conflict; The Islamic Republic of Iran cuts all ties with Israel, which would later evolve into the Iran–Israel proxy conflict
Aftermath of the Iranian Revolution (1979–1983): Haft-e Tir bombing; 1981 Iranian Prime Minister's office bombing; Part of Terrorism in Iran and the Cold War	Political: Islamic Republican Party; Combatant Clergy Association; Islamic Coalition Society; Armed groups: Armed Forces; Artesh (Army); IRGC; Others: Revolutionary Committees; Mojahedin of the Islamic Revolution Organization; Muslim Student Followers of the Imam's Line	Political: Freedom Movement; National Front; JAMA; Movement of Militant Muslims; Nation Party; Muslim People's Republic Party; National Democratic Front; National Resistance Movement of Iran; Pan-Iranist Party; Azadegan; Armed groups: MEK; Tudeh Party; Peykar; Furqan; (Iran) NEQAB; Union of Iranian Communists; Union of Communist Militants; Workers' Way; Fedaian (majority); Fedaian (minority); Fedai Guerrillas; Laborers' Party; Turkmen People's Cultural and Political Society; Separatists: KDPI; Komala; DRFLA; PFLA; AFLA; Iraq	Islamic Republican Party victory	Islamic Republican Party victory: Ruhollah Khomeini consolidates power; Referendum and establishment of Islamic Republic of Iran; Iran hostage crisis and resignation of the Provisional Revolutionary Government; Rebellions in Kordestan, Khuzestan, Khorasan and Baluchistan suppressed; NEQAB coup d'état failed; Impeachment and exile of Abolhassan Banisadr; Crackdown on opposition and political opposition parties banned; Implementation of the "Iranian Cultural Revolution"; Hijab for all women by law; Iran–Iraq War commences (and continues until 1988); Armed opposition largely marginalized; low-level insurgency continues
1979 Iranian ethnic unrest: Part of the Consolidation of the Iranian Revolution, Azerbaijani separatism and Kurdish separatism in Iran	Interim Government Islamic Republic of Iran	Azerbaijani rebels Kurdish rebels Ahwazi rebels Turkmen rebels Qashqai rebels Supported by: Iraq	Victory	Suppression of all revolts
1979 Turkmen rebellion in Iran (1979): Part of the Consolidation of the Iranian Revolution	Iran	Iranian Turkmen rebels	Victory	Uprising crushed.
1979 Kurdish rebellion in Iran (1979–1996): Part of the Consolidation of the Iranian Revolution, Iran–Iraq War, and Kurdish separatism in Iran	Interim Government Islamic Republic of Iran (1980−83)	KDP-I; Komala; IPFG; OIPFG (Minority); Sipay Rizgari Supported by: Iraq	Victory	Iranian forces mostly diverted to the Iran–Iraq War front since late 1980; Pockets of KDPI resistance remained until 1996
1979 Khuzestan insurgency (1979): Part of the Consolidation of the Iranian Revolution and Arab separatism in Khuzestan	Interim Government; Islamic Republic of Iran (From 6 November)	DRFLA; APCO; PFLA; AFLA Supported by: Iraq	Victory	Iranian victory: Uprising quelled; DRFLA siege of Iranian embassy in 1980
Iran–Iraq War (1980–1988): Part of the Cold War, the aftermath of the Iranian Revolution, the Iraqi–Kurdish conflict, the Assadist–Saddamist conflict and the Iran–Saudi Arabia proxy conflict	Iran KDP; PUK; ISCI; Islamic Dawa Party; Hezbollah Shia volunteers from: (Democratic Republic of Afghanistan) Afghanistan; Abuzar Brigade; Iraq; Badr Organization; Lebanon; Hezbollah; Pakistan; Tehreek-e-Jafaria (Pakistan); Sipah-e-Muhammad Pakistan; Kuwait; Bahrain; India	Iraq DRFLA; MEK; NCRI; PDKI; Salvation Force Arab volunteers from: Egypt; Jordan; Morocco; North Yemen; Sudan; Tunisia	Inconclusive (Note: Iraq claimed victory following a successful 1988 counter-offensive aimed at expelling Iranian forces from Iraq which compelled Iran to submit to a ceasefire the same year, and also due to the country becoming the dominant power in the Middle East as a result of the conflict. Iran also claimed victory for expelling Iraqi forces from Iran following 1982 offensives, despite failing in its later-goal to overthrow the Iraqi government and also despite suffering higher military and economic losses than Iraq.)	Status quo ante bellum (Note: After the war concluded, Iraq continued to maintain control over the entire Shatt al-Arab and other Iranian territories it had occupied along the border, covering an area of 9,600 km^{2}. It was not until 16 August 1990 that Iraq agreed to return these occupied territories to Iran and to divide sovereignty over the Shatt al-Arab. This restored the border to the terms established by the 1975 Algiers Agreement.)
Lebanese Civil War (1975–1990): Part of Iran–Israel proxy conflict and Iran–Saudi Arabia proxy war, Arab–Israeli conflict, Arab Cold War and Cold War.	Hezbollah (1982–1990) Iran (from 1980, mainly IRGC and Army paramilitary units)	Lebanese Front: Kataeb Party; Lebanese Forces; Marada Brigades (until 1978) Guardians of the Cedars Al-Tanzim Lebanese Youth Movement (MKG) Tyous Team of Commandos Zahliote Group Shuraya Party Vanguard of the Maani Army (MDJ) (Other minor organizations); Army of Free Lebanon (until 1977) SLA (from 1976) Israel (from 1978) Tigers Militia (until 1980) Lebanese National Movement (1975–1982) Jammoul (1982–1990): Al-Mourabitoun; Progressive Socialist Party (PSP); Lebanese Communist Party (LCP); Syrian Social Nationalist Party in Lebanon (SSNP); Communist Action Organization in Lebanon (OCAL); Lebanese Movement in Support of Fatah (LMSF); Arab Socialist Ba'ath Party – Lebanon Region; Revolutionary Communist Group; Sixth of February Movement; Socialist Arab Lebanon Vanguard Party (SALVP) Popular Nasserist Organization (PNO) Lebanese Arab Army (LAA) Other minor organizations; PLO (1975–1983) ASALA Islamic Unification Movement (from 1982) Lebanese Armed Forces UNIFIL (from 1978) Multinational Force in Lebanon (1982–1984): United States; UK; France; Italy; Syria (1976, 1983–1991) Amal Movement PNSF Marada Brigades (left LF in 1978; aligned with Syria) Arab Deterrent Force (1976–1982) List: Saudi Arabia (1976–1979); Sudan (1976–1979); UAE (1976–1979); Libya (1976 only); South Yemen (1976–1977)	Compromise	Taif Agreement: Christian-to-Muslim representation in Parliament of Lebanon adjusted from ratio of 55:45 to 50:50.; Political powers of Muslim-reserved position of Prime Minister strengthened over Christian-reserved position of President.; Disarmament of all Lebanese and non-Lebanese militias, excluding Iran-backed Hezbollah.; Continued hostilities between Lebanon and the Palestine Liberation Organization (PLO), and PLO expulsion to Tunis, Tunisia in 1982.: Expulsion of Palestinian militias from Lebanon after the Battle of Sidon in 1991; Collapse of the Israel-backed State of Free Lebanon in 1984 and of Israel's South Lebanon security belt administration in 2000. Continued fighting between Israel and Hezbollah in the Shebaa Farms conflict, eventually leading to the 2006 Lebanon War.: Dominance of Hezbollah armed strength across Lebanon since 1990; Syria occupies northern/eastern Lebanon until 30 April 2005. Israel occupies southern Lebanon until 25 May 2000.
1982 Lebanon War (1982): Part of the Lebanese Civil War	PLO; Syria; Lebanese National Resistance Front; Al-Mourabitoun; PKK; Supported by: Iran; Hezbollah	Israel; Lebanese Forces (16 September 1982); South Lebanon Army	Inconclusive	PLO withdrawal from Lebanon: End of the Palestinian insurgency in South Lebanon; Israeli occupation of Southern Lebanon: Beginning of the Southern Lebanon conflict
1982 Amol uprising (1982): Part of the Consolidation of the Iranian Revolution	Iran	Union of Iranian Communists	Victory	UIC leadership is dismantled.
KDPI–Komala conflict (1984−1991)	Iran	KDP-I Komala	Victory	Both armed forces debilitate and Iran maintain control of Iranian Kurdistan.
KDPI insurgency (1989–1996)	Iran	KDP-I	Victory	KDPI announces unilateral cease-fire in 1996.
Afghan Civil War (1996–2001): 1998 killing of Iranian diplomats in Afghanistan; Eastern Iran clashes; Part of the Afghan conflict, and Iran-Taliban conflict and Iran-Al Qaeda conflict	Islamic State of Afghanistan (Northern Alliance) Supported by: Russia Iran Uzbekistan India Tajikistan	Islamic Emirate of Afghanistan (Taliban); Haqqani network; Al-Qaeda; Islamic Movement of Uzbekistan; Supported by: Pakistan	Stalemate	Development of the Six plus Two Group on Afghanistan.; United States invasion of Afghanistan
Arab civil unrest and insurgency on Khuzestan (1999−2020): Part of Iran–Saudi Arabia proxy conflict	Iran	ASMLA; NLMA; Ansar Al-Furqan; Supported by: Iraq (until 2003); Saudi Arabia	Victory	Revolts suppressed
War in Afghanistan (2001–2021) (until 2002): United States invasion of Afghanistan; 2001 uprising in Herat; Part of the war on terror, Iran-Al Qaeda conflict and Iran-Taliban conflict	United States; United Kingdom; Northern Alliance; Canada; Italy; Germany; Australia; New Zealand; Iran (until 2002)	Taliban: Haqqani Network; Al-Qaeda: 055 Brigade; Foreign fighters	Victory	Fall of the Taliban government in Afghanistan.; Iran quits the coalition and forms the Axis of Resistance after the Axis of evil speech, ending its collaboration with the US coalition.
Third Pakistani-Balochistan Conflict (2004–present): 2010 attack on Pakistan ambassador to Iran	Pakistan Forces involved: Pakistan Armed Forces; Pakistan Army (until 2008, again from 2024); Pakistan Air Force; Pakistan Navy; Special Forces: SSG; SSW; SSG-N; Pakistan Marines; Civil Armed Forces; Frontier Corps; Frontier Corps Balochistan (North); Frontier Corps Balochistan (South); Pakistan Coast Guards; Pakistan Levies; Frontier Constabulary; Pakistan Police; Balochistan Police; Counter Terrorism Department; Balochistan Levies; Pakistani Intelligence community; NACTA; ISI; MI; FIA; Iran Forces involved: Iranian Armed Forces; Artesh (since 1979); Ground Forces; Air Force; Navy; Special forces: NOHED Brigade; 3rd Marine Brigade; IRGC (since 1980); Ground Forces; Aerospace Force; Navy; Basij; Special forces: Saberin Takavar Brigade; 110th Salman Farsi Special Operations Brigade; Sepah Navy Special Force; Iranian police; Border Guard (since 2000); Ministry of Intelligence; Imperial Iranian Army (until 1979)	Baloch separatist factions: BLA; Majeed Brigade; Fateh Squad; BLF; Baloch Raaji Aajoi Sangar; LeB (inactive); BLUF (2009–2010); BSO (Azad) (inactive); BNA (2022–2023); BRA (2006–2022); UBA (2013–2022); Other Baloch Separatist groups; Sectarian factions: Ansar Al-Furqan (since 2013); Jaysh al-Adl (since 2012); Harakat Ansar (2012–13); Hizbul-Furqan (2012–13); Jundallah (2003–12); Islamic State (since 2014); IS-KP (since 2015); IS-PP (since 2019); Tehrik-i-Taliban Pakistan (since 2007); Lashkar-e-Jhangvi (1996–2024); Sipah-e-Sahaba (1985–2018)	Ongoing	Extension of the conflict into Iran; Operation Azm-e-Istehkam continuous in Pakistan
Sistan and Baluchestan insurgency (2004–present): 2024 Iranian missile strikes in Pakistan; Operation Marg Bar Sarmachar	Iran: Iranian Armed Forces; Artesh (since 1979); Ground Forces; Air Force; Navy; Special forces: NOHED Brigade; 3rd Marine Brigade; IRGC (since 1980); Ground Forces; Aerospace Force; Navy; Basij; Special forces: Saberin Takavar Brigade; 110th Salman Farsi Special Operations Brigade; Sepah Navy Special Force; Iranian police; Border Guard (since 2000); Ministry of Intelligence; Imperial Iranian Army (until 1979)	Current: Jaish ul-Adl (2013–present); Ansar Al-Furqan (2013–present); BLA; BLF; Former: Jundallah (2004–2011); Harakat Ansar (2012–2013)	Ongoing	Ongoing insurgency
Iran–PJAK Conflict (2004–present) 7: Part of Kurdish separatism in Iran	Iran; Turkey	PJAK	Ongoing	PJAK withdraws from Iranian territory
2006 Lebanon War (2006): Part of the Israeli–Lebanese conflict, the Iran–Israel proxy conflict and the war on terror	Hezbollah Amal Movement Lebanese Communist Party Popular Front for the Liberation of Palestine – General Command Syrian Social Nationalist Party in Lebanon Supported by: Iran; Ba'athist Syria	Israel	Inconclusive	Israel occupies Ghajar until present
Afghanistan–Iran border skirmishes (2007–2023): 2009 Afghanistan–Iran clash; 2021 Afghanistan–Iran clashes; 2023 Afghanistan–Iran clash; part of Afghan conflict and Iran-Taliban conflict	Iran	Islamic Republic of Afghanistan; Afghanistan	Stalemate	Status quo ante bellum
War on ISIS (2013–ongoing): Iran-Islamic State conflict	Iraq; Iraqi Kurdistan; Free Syrian Army; Rojava; United States; United Kingdom; Jordan; Turkey; Saudi Arabia; Bahrain; Qatar; United Arab Emirates; Morocco; Australia; Belgium; Canada; France; Germany; Denmark; Norway; Russia; Iran	Islamic State: Sinai Province; Lebanon Province; Yemen Province; Khorasan Province; Pakistan Province; Caucasus Province; al-Nusra Front Khorasan	Victory	Successful repression against ISIS guerrilla warfare. Russia–Syria–Iran–Iraq coalition is formed.
Syrian Civil War (2011–2024): Iranian intervention in Syria; Hezbollah involvement in the Syrian civil war; Israeli–Syrian ceasefire line incidents during the Syrian civil war; Syrian civil war spillover in Lebanon; Iran–Israel conflict during the Syrian civil war; part of Iran–Saudi Arabia proxy conflict, Iran–Israel proxy conflict, Hezbollah–Israel conflict, Iran-Al Qaeda conflict and War against the Islamic State	Iran (since 2013); Ba'athist Syria Iraq (2017–19); Hezbollah; Russia	Free Syrian Army Supported By: United States; United Kingdom; France; Germany; Italy; Netherlands; Belgium; Denmark; Norway; Canada; Australia; Morocco; Bahrain; Qatar; Jordan; United Arab Emirates; Islamic Front Supported By: Turkey; Saudi Arabia; Qatar; Ahrar al-Sham Tahrir al-Sham al-Nusra Front; ISIL Al-Qaeda Autonomous Administration of North and East Syria Supported By: CJTF–OIR; Kurdistan Region; Israel	Defeat	Islamic State in Syria defeated near the end of 2017.; Assad regime falls and Iranian forces withdraw after 2024 Syrian opposition offensives, starting Assadist loyalist revolts.; The Syrian Salvation Government and the Syrian Interim Government develops the Syrian caretaker government.; Beginning of resistance by SSNP and allies against Israel after the occupation of Quneitra Governorate.
War in Iraq (2013–2017): Iranian intervention in Iraq (2014–present); part of War against the Islamic State and Iran-Islamic State conflict	Iraq; Peshmerga; Iran; Asa'ib Ahl al-Haq; Badr Organization; Hezbollah; Kata'ib Hezbollah; Kata'ib al-Imam Ali: Kataib Rouh Allah Issa Ibn Miriam; United States	Islamic State in Iraq and the Levant Naqshbandi Army	Victory	Iraqi government and allied victory against ISIL Iran played a significant role in this victory. End of ISIL territorial control in Iraq; ongoing ISIL insurgency
Yemeni civil war (2014–present): Houthi–Saudi Arabian conflict; Al-Qaeda insurgency in Yemen; part of Iran–Saudi Arabia proxy conflict, Iran–Israel proxy conflict, Hezbollah–Israel conflict and Iran-Al Qaeda conflict	Supreme Political Council (formerly SRC); Houthis; GPC (pro-Houthi); Saleh loyalists (until 2017); Pro-Houthi Popular Committees; Sanaa-GPC forces; Supported by: Iran; Hezbollah; Ba'athist Syria (until 2024); Qatar; North Korea	Republic of Yemen (internationally-recognized; led by the PLC since 2022); Yemeni Armed Forces; Republican Guard; GPC; STC (2022–present) (Note: Formed by a faction of the Southern Movement, it was established on 11 May 2017, and has called for the secession of a proposed federal "State of South Arabia" from the rest of the nation along the borders of South Yemen, with the name being inspired from the British-created Federation of South Arabia.); United Arab Emirates; National Resistance (2017–present); Tihamah Resistance; Giants Brigades; Hadhramaut Tribal Alliance; Al-Islah; Bani Dhabyan; Saleh loyalists (2017–present); Popular Resistance; Popular Committees; Supported by: United States; U.S. Navy (Note: logistic support and assistance with the naval blockade of Houthi-held territories in October 2016); United States Army (Special Forces) United Kingdom (Note: training, intelligence, logistical support, weapons, and blockade up to 2017) France Canada Malaysia Australia; (Saudi Arabia) Saudi-led coalition: Saudi Arabia; United Arab Emirates (2015–2025); Sudan (2015–2019) Rapid Support Forces Janjaweed (2019–2023) Senegal; Morocco (2015–2019); Qatar (2015–2017); Kuwait; Jordan; Bahrain; South Korea; Southern Transitional Council (2017–2026) United Arab Emirates: Al-Qaeda and allies; AQAP; Ansar al-Sharia; Council of Scholars of Ahl al-Sunna wal-Jama'ah; Hadhrami Domestic council; Dhi Na'im tribe; Al-Hamiqan tribe; Islamic State; Yemen Province	de jure ceasefire	Ceasefire since 2 April 2022 with some periodic clashes. Iranian support for the Houthis is consolidated.
Iran–Pakistan border skirmishes (2014–2024): 2024 Iran–Pakistan conflict; 2024 Saravan killings; Part of the insurgency in Balochistan and Sistan and Baluchestan insurgency	Iran Claimed by Pakistan: Baloch nationalists: Balochistan Liberation Army; Balochistan Liberation Front	Pakistan Claimed by Iran: Jihadists: Jaish ul-Adl	Inconclusive	Ceasefire. Pakistan and Iran develops joint operations against Baloch separatism.
Western Iran clashes: Part of Iran–Saudi Arabia proxy conflict	Iran	PDKI PJAK Komala PAK Khebat	Status quo	Restart of armed resistance against the Islamic Republic of Iran. However, eastern Kurdistan has not yet become a Kurdish state.
Islamic State insurgency in Iraq (2017–present): Part of Iraqi conflict	Iraq: Pro-government tribes (ar); Rojava (cross-border cooperation since May 2018) Supported by: CJTF-OIR (until 2021): United States; United Kingdom; France; Iran Russia Kurdistan Region: Peshmerga; Supported by: Netherlands	Islamic State White Flags	Victory	Continuation of the conflict against Islamic State; 2019–2021 Iraqi protests against Iranian influence; Clashes between US and Iran and allies in the context of the Second Cold War.
2019–2021 Persian Gulf crisis (2019–2021): May 2019 Gulf of Oman incident; June 2019 Gulf of Oman incident; 2019 Iranian shoot-down of American drone; Abqaiq–Khurais attack; 2019 K-1 Air Base attack; December 2019 United States airstrikes in Iraq and Syria; Attack on the United States embassy in Baghdad; Assassination of Qasem Soleimani; Operation Martyr Soleimani; 2020 Camp Taji attacks; Part of US-led intervention in Iraq (2014–2021), US intervention in the Syrian civil war and war on terror	Iran Supported by: Iraq; Ba'athist Syria; Houthis	United States Supported by: Saudi Arabia; Israel; United Kingdom	Inconclusive	2019–2020 Iranian protests.; Funeral of Qasem Soleimani.; American withdrawal from Iraqi conflict.
Gaza war (2023–present): 2023 Israel–Lebanon border clashes; 2023 attacks on U.S. bases in Iraq and Syria; 2024 Iran–Israel conflict; Red Sea crisis; Hezbollah–Syria clashes (2024–present); Part of Iran–Israel proxy conflict, Middle Eastern crisis (2023–present), Gaza–Israel conflict and Iran–Saudi Arabia proxy conflict	Hamas Palestinian allies: Palestinian Islamic Jihad Popular Front for the Liberation of Palestine Democratic Front for the Liberation of Palestine Al-Aqsa Martyrs' Brigades Palestinian Mujahideen Movement Palestinian Freedom Movement Popular Resistance Committees Popular Front for the Liberation of Palestine – General Command; Supported by: Axis of Resistance: Iran (until 2025); Ba'athist Syria (until 2024); Houthis; Hezbollah; Islamic Resistance in Iraq; Badr Organization; True Promise Corps	Israel Israeli-backed groups: Popular Forces (Note: From May 2024. Popular Forces have been described as a Salafi Jihadist organization with alleged ties to the Islamic State. Several senior leaders in the Popular Forces also allied with the Islamic State in the Sinai.); Fatah-affiliated groups; Supported by: United States; United Kingdom; France; Only intelligence support: Saudi Arabia; United Arab Emirates; Jordan	Ongoing	Iranian proxy groups initiate offensives against US military bases. Hamas is severely weakened.; Entire leadership of Hezbollah wiped off and the organization is severely contained with a lot of their arms and military assets destroyed or dismantled.; Economic and military loss to Houthi with both their ports and airport destroyed.; The pro-Iranian government of Syria is overthrown and is replaced by Ahmad al-Sharaa.; Palestinian internal political violence leads to Hamas–Popular Forces conflict.; Ceasefire since October 2025 according to Gaza peace plan.; Gaza genocide as a consequence of Israeli war crimes.
Spillover of the Gaza war in Syria (2023–present): 2024 Iran–Israel conflict; Israeli airstrike on the Iranian consulate in Damascus; Turkish offensive in Northern Syria; Israeli invasion of Syria; Hezbollah–Syria clashes (2024–present); Part of the 2023 Gaza war, 2023 Middle Eastern crisis, Hezbollah–Israel conflict (2023–present), Iran–Israel conflict during the Syrian civil war, and the Syrian conflict (2024–present)	Assadists (former Ba'athist Syria) (Note: The Syrian Arab Republic under Assad was supported by Iran, Hezbollah and Iraqi militias until his fall on 8 December 2024) Islamic Resistance Front in Syria Supported by: (Note: Until 8 December 2024); Iran (until 2024); Popular Mobilization Forces; Hezbollah (Palestine) Palestinian militias Syria (former opposition) (Note: The Syrian caretaker government was established two days after Assad was overthrown on 10 December) Supported by: Turkey Ukraine (denied by Ukraine)	Israel; Druze allies: Autonomous Administration of North and East Syria; CJTF–OIR; United States	Ongoing	2024 Syrian insurgency leads to the Fall of the Assad regime and Iranian withdrawal of its direct presence in Syria, depending of proxys like Assadist insurgents.; Start of Syrian conflict (2024–present).
Red Sea crisis (2023–present): Operation Sankalp; Operation Prosperity Guardian; March–May 2025 United States attacks in Yemen; Part of the Iran–Israel proxy conflict, the Middle Eastern crisis (2023–present), and the Yemeni civil war (2014–present	Axis of Resistance; Houthis (Note: Political legitimacy of all Houthi-led government bodies has been rejected by the United Nations, rival Yemeni factions, the Gulf Cooperation Council, and the United States.); Iran (Note: Multiple sources indicate that the Iranian government has deployed military personnel to Houthi-controlled Yemen who are actively involved in attacks on commercial shipping.); Hezbollah; Islamic Resistance in Iraq	Israel Prosperity Guardian: United States; United Kingdom; Australia; Bahrain; Canada; Denmark; New Zealand; Norway; Seychelles; Singapore; Sri Lanka; Aspides: European Union; Belgium; Estonia; Finland; France; Germany; Greece; Italy; Latvia; Netherlands; Sweden; Independent Patrols: China; Egypt; India; Pakistan; Saudi Arabia	Ongoing	2025 United States–Houthi ceasefire. Attacks resumed after 2026 Israeli–United States strikes on Iran
Twelve-Day War (2025): 2025 United States strikes on Iranian nuclear sites; part of Middle Eastern crisis (2023–present)	Iran; Houthi movement Supported by: Hamas; Hezbollah; Islamic Resistance in Iraq	Israel; United States Supported by: France; Iranian opposition; Only defensive support: Jordan; Saudi Arabia; Qatar; Iraq	Ceasefire	Ceasefire was mediated by the United States and Qatar.; Suspension of 2025 Iran–United States negotiations.; Israel destroys Iran's nuclear sites, one of its primary objectives.; Houthis increase their hostility to Israel and US; 2025–present Iran internal crisis: Iranian opposition to the Iranian government and Ayatollah Khamenei increases.; Iranians rally against Israel and the United States.; 2025 Afghan deportation from Iran.
2025–2026 Iranian protests: 2025–present Iran internal crisis; 2026 Kurdish–Iranian crisis	Government of Iran Iranian Armed Forces: Islamic Republic of Iran Armed Forces; Police Command; Islamic Revolutionary Guard Corps; Basij; Nabi Akram Corps; Ground Forces; Pro-government counterprotesters and plainclothesmen Pro-government foreign Shia militias: Popular Mobilisation Forces; Kata'ib Hezbollah; Harakat al-Nujaba; Kata'ib Sayyid ul-Shuhada; Badr Organization; Hezbollah; Liwa Fatemiyoun; Liwa Zainebiyoun; Nakhsa	Iranian opposition; Anti-government demonstrators; Student demonstrators; Police and military defectors; Armed civilians; Political groups: Iran National Council (INC); Mojahedin-e-Khalq (MEK); National Council of Resistance of Iran (NCRI); Solidarity for a Secular Democratic Republic in Iran; Separatist groups: Kurdish separatists; Democratic Party of Iranian Kurdistan; Kurdistan Freedom Party; Kurdistan Free Life Party; Xebat; Komalah; Revolutionary Toilers Association; Kurdistan Toilers Association; Kurdistan National Guard; Zagros Tornado units; Baloch separatists; People's Fighters Front; Balochistan People's Party; Azerbaijani separatists; South Azerbaijan Organisations Cooperation Council; Coordination Council of Azerbaijani Parties in Iran; Labour, civil, and retiree groups: Free Workers Union of Iran; Iranian Writers Association; Coordination Council of Iranian Teachers Trade Associations; Haft Tappeh Sugarcane Workers Syndicate; Coordination Committee to Help Form Independent Labour Organisations; Khuzestan Retired Workers; Union of Retirees Group; Kurdish Women's Organisations; Retirees Union; Kermanshah Electricity and Metal Association; "Stop Executions"; "Justice Seekers"; Coordination Council for Protests of Contract Oil Workers; Coordination Council for Protests of Non-Formal Oil Workers; Coordination Council of Nurses Protests; "Neday-e Zanan-e Iran"; World Iranian Christian Alliance; Supported by: United States (since 28 February 2026); Israel (since 28 February 2026)	Suppressed	Increase of Iranian economic crisis and risk of civil war; 2026 Internet blackout in Iran; Western support to protesters leads to 2026 Iran–United States crisis.
2026 Iran war: Lebanon theater; Beit Awwa salon strike; Israel attack on UNIFIL post in Aadchit al-Qusayr; Syrian campaign; Iraqi campaign; Kurdistan Region; US–Israel conflict with pro-Iran Iraqi militias; Arabian monarchies campaign; Jordan; Kuwait; Saudi Arabia; Bahrain; Qatar; United Arab Emirates; Oman; Red Sea campaign; List of attacks; Iranian-Shia militia attacks; Israel; US consulate in Karachi; Cyprus; Azerbaijan; British military facilities; Egypt; US-Israel attacks; Minab school airstrike; Iranian Kurdistan; Sinking of IRIS Dena; Qeshm Island; Kharg Island; South Pars field; Strait of Hormuz; Regime change efforts in the 2026 Iran war; 2026 Iran war regional mobilizations; NATO Operations in Turkey; Operation Muhafiz-ul-Bahr (Pakistan); Operation Urja Suraksha (India); Part of Iran–Israel proxy conflict and American expansionism under Donald Trump	Iran Supported by: Axis of Resistance: Hezbollah; Houthi movement; Amal Movement; Kata'ib Hezbollah; Popular Mobilization Forces; Islamic Resistance in Iraq; Russia (intelligence only) Non-aligned attacked by Israel: Hamas; Palestinian Islamic Jihad; (Popular Front for the Liberation of Palestine) PFLP; Islamic Group; Lebanese Forces (Note: On 5 April 2026, Israel launched an airstrike on what it called "a terror target" in the predominantly Christian town of Ain Saadeh east of Beirut. A Lebanese Forces party official and his wife were killed by the strike, though Israel later stated they were not the intended targets. There has been speculation that Israeli strikes on Christian communities in Lebanon are aimed at inflaming sectarian tensions.); Syrian Social Nationalist Party; Cobelligerent attacked by both: Iraq; Iraqi Kurdistan; Lebanon; Palestine; Syria (transitional government); (United Nations) UNIFIL	Israel; United States Supported by: Saudi Arabia (Note: On 29 July 2026, Saudi Arabia publicly participated in joint strikes with the United States against Iran-backed Iraqi militias. Earlier, according to Reuters, citing Western and Iranian officials, the Saudi Air Force launched numerous unpublicized "tit-for-tat" strikes on Iranian soil in late March 2026, in retaliation for Iranian attacks on Saudi Arabia. The New York Times, citing US officials, corroborated reports of Saudi strikes on Iran. Reuters also reported that the Saudi Air Force struck Iran-backed Iraqi militias near the Iraqi–Saudi border around the time of the 7 April ceasefire.) United Arab Emirates (Note: According to The Wall Street Journal and Bloomberg, citing "people familiar with the matter", and The New York Times, citing current and former US officials, the UAE discreetly carried out retaliatory attacks against Iran, including a strike on an oil refinery at Lavan Island on 8 April.) Kuwait (Note: According to The Wall Street Journal, Kuwait launched attacks on Iran-backed Iraqi militias from its own territory. Iraqi officials reported at least two rocket attacks from Kuwaiti territory in April; according to Reuters, it was unclear whether they were launched by the Kuwaiti Armed Forces or the US military. On 1 May, Kuwait said its soldiers exchanged fire with six members of Iran's Islamic Revolutionary Guards Corps, and arrested four, during an Iranian raid on Bubiyan Island. In July, The Wall Street Journal reported that Kuwait launched airstrikes inside Iran. Kuwait denied the reports and said it had not taken part in any military operations against Iran and had not allowed the use of its territory to launch offensive operations against any neighbouring country.) Bahrain (Note: According to The Wall Street Journal, Bahrain launched airstrikes inside Iran in July 2026.) Yemen (PLC) (Note: On 13 July 2026, the Yemeni government, alongside Saudi Arabia, conducted airstrikes targeting the Houthi-controlled Sanaa International Airport. The Yemeni Ministry of Defence later confirmed their direct involvement, stating the operation specifically targeted the runway to prevent an Iranian aircraft from landing.); Iranian opposition: Monarchists; NCRI; Separatists; CPFIK; (Kurdistan Region) Sun of Hope; People's Fighters Front; Ahwaz Falcons; In defense only: NATO: Bulgaria; France; Germany; Greece; Italy; Netherlands; Spain; Turkey; Northern Cyprus; United Kingdom; Akrotiri and Dhekelia; British Indian Ocean Territory; Australia Canada Ukraine Non-aligned attacked by Iran: Azerbaijan; Cyprus; Egypt (Note: On 29 July, two floating LNG storage tankers, the Energos Winter and the GasLog Salem, were struck by drones at the Egyptian port of Damietta. Two Iranian officials, speaking to the New York Times, said the drone strike was "designed to show that global shipping and energy supplies could be more deeply disrupted if Iran chose to escalate."); Jordan; Oman; Qatar	Ongoing	2025–2026 Iran–United States negotiations; 2026 United States military buildup in the Middle East; Iranian officials killed during the 2026 Iran conflict; Assassination of Ali Khamenei; 2026 Israeli state of emergency; Iran Prosperity Project proposed by the National Union for Democracy in Iran and House of Pahlavi; Anti-war protesters and Shiite communities around the world protest in defense of Iran.; 2026 Strait of Hormuz crisis leads to an effective halt in shipping traffic of Oil in the region, as also an US naval blockade of Iran.; Israel closes all crossings at the Egypt–Gaza border, suspending the humanitarian aid for the Gazans.; Economic impact of the 2026 Iran war around the world due to the 2026 Strait of Hormuz crisis; Temporary ceasefire between Iran and the United States since 8 April, and Hezbollah and Israel since 16 April 2026, leading to the Islamabad Talks

== Minor conflicts, proxy wars, military incidents and alleged interventions ==
Conflict	Iran (and allies)	Opponents	Results	Notes
Palestinian insurgency in South Lebanon (1968–1982): Part of the Israeli–Palestinian conflict, Israeli–Lebanese conflict, the Lebanese Civil War, and the Arab Cold War	Palestine Liberation Organization Syria Lebanese National Movement Lebanese National Resistance Front Supported by: Soviet Union; People's Revolutionary Organization of the Islamic Republic of Iran (1979–1980)	Israel South Lebanon Army Lebanese Forces	Defeat	1982 kidnapping of Iranian diplomats.; Beginning of the South Lebanon conflict.; Mohammad Montazeri (son of Grand Ayatollah Hussein-Ali Montazeri) and Mehdi Hashemi creates the Liberation Movements Unit to Export revolution in the Levant.; Factional conflicts, as different Iranian factions promoted Hezbollah or Amal.
Iran–Saudi Arabia proxy conflict (11 February 1979–present): 1979 Qatif Uprising; 1987 Mecca incident; Houthi insurgency; Operation Scorched Earth; Saudi-led intervention in Bahrain; Syrian civil war spillover in Lebanon; 2011 alleged Iran assassination plot; 2011–2012 Saudi Arabian protests; Saudi-led intervention in the Yemeni civil war; Saudi involvement in the Syrian civil war; 2015 Mina stampede; 2016 Saudi Arabia mass execution; 2016 attack on the Saudi diplomatic missions in Iran; 2017–2020 Qatif unrest; 2019 Afif attack; part of the post–Cold War era, Iran–Israel proxy conflict, Iran–Turkey proxy conflict, and Qatar–Saudi Arabia diplomatic conflict	Iran Proxies: Hezbollah Al-Hejaz; (Ba'athist Syria) Syrian Popular Resistance (since 2024); OIRAP (1979–1988); Liwa Fatemiyoun; Houthis; Syria (until 2024); Popular Mobilization Forces; Al-Ashtar Brigades; Al-Mukhtar Brigades; Hezbollah; Hamas; Hüseynçilər; Muslim Brotherhood; Liwa Zainebiyoun; IMN; Sipah-e-Muhammad Pakistan	Saudi Arabia Proxies: FSA (until 2017); Syria (since 2024); KDPI; Jaish ul-Adl; PJAK; Komala; LNA; ANR; ASMLA; (Palestine) PNA; PAK; Yemen; JRTN (from 2006); LF; MEK; Sipah-e-Sahaba Pakistan	Ongoing	Ongoing: February 2019 Warsaw Conference; Formation of an Arab–Israeli alliance and the Axis of Resistance.
Assadist–Saddamist conflict (22 July 1979–2024): part of the Arab Cold War (until 1990), Iran–Saudi Arabia proxy conflict (until 1990), Iraq–Syria relations, and Shia–Sunni conflict (until 1990)	Assadists: Ba'ath Party (Syrian-dominated faction); Ba'ath Party – Syria Region; Assadists in Iraq; Al-Awda (alleged); Assadists in other Arab states; Ba'athist Syria (until 2024); (Ba'athist Syria) Syrian Popular Resistance (from 2024); Supported by: Iran; Hezbollah; Iraq (from 2004); Popular Mobilization Forces; Badr Organization; ISCI; Iraqi Shia militias; Dawa; Kurdistan Region/Peshmerga; KDP; PUK; Libya (until 1987); North Korea; Soviet Union (until 1991); Russia (from 2000s); (Palestine) PLO (factions); SSNP; DFLP; Houthis (until 2023); South Yemen (until 1990)	Saddamists: Ba'ath Party (Iraqi-dominated faction); Ba'ath Party – Iraq Region; Saddamists in Syria; Saddamists in other Arab states; Ba'athist Iraq (until 2003); (Ba'athist Iraq) JRTN (from 2006); Supported by: (Iran) MEK (until 2003); United States (until 1990); United Kingdom (until 1990); West Germany (until 1990); Italy (until 1990); Egypt (until 1990); Saudi Arabia (until 1990); Kuwait (until 1990); Jordan; France; Libya (from 1990s, limited legal support); Soviet Union (until 1991); North Yemen (until 1990); Lebanese Forces (from 1980); Muslim Brotherhood in Syria; (Syrian opposition) Free Syrian Army; (Palestine) PLO (factions)	Inconclusive	Inconclusive: Saddamists ousted from power in Iraq in 2003; Assadists ousted from power in Syria in 2024
Qatif conflict (1979–2023): part of the Iran–Saudi Arabia proxy conflict, Anti-Shia discrimination in Saudi Arabia, Arab Spring and the Shia-Sunni conflict	Iran-backed Shia militants (1980s–1990s): Organization for the Islamic Revolution in the Arabian Peninsula (1979–91); Hezbollah Al-Hejaz (1987–2023; mostly inactive from 1990s); Saudi Shia civilians	(Saudi Arabia) Saudi Arabian Government: Saudi Arabian National Guard; Presidency of State Security; Saudi Police	Stalemate	Conflict ended
Soviet–Afghan War (1979–1989): Foreign involvement in the Soviet–Afghan War; 1982 Harmak incident; 1988 Shindand SuperCobra incident; Part of Afghan conflict and the Cold War in Asia	Afghan Mujahideen Sunni Mujahideen Supported by: Pakistan Shia Mujahideen and Hazaras: Tehran Eight; Supported by: Iran Maoist Mujahideen Supported by: People's Republic of China	Soviet Union; Afghanistan; Al Zulfiqar	Victory	Soviet withdrawal from Afghanistan.; Iran backed Hezbe Wahdat is formed.; Increase of Afghans in Iran as refugees.
Sectarian violence in Pakistan (1947−Present): Insurgency in Balochistan; Killing of Iranian Diplomats in Pakistan (1997−2000); Part of Terrorism in Pakistan and Shia-Sunni divide	Shia Groups: Tehreek-e-Jafaria; Sipah-e-Muhammad Pakistan; Ansar-ul-Hussain; Khatam-ul-Anbia; Supported by: Iran (since 1979): Liwa Zainabiyoun	Pakistan: Government of Pakistan; Ministry of Defence; Pakistan Armed Forces; Pakistan Army; Pakistan Air Force; Pakistan Navy; Ministry of Interior; Civil Armed Forces; Pakistan Levies; Frontier Corps; Pakistan Rangers; Pakistan Coast Guards; Gilgit Baltistan Scouts; Federal Constabulary; Pakistan Police; Counter Terrorism Department; Balochistan Levies; Pakistani Intelligence community; NACTA; ISI; MI; IB; FIA; SB; Victims: Shia Muslims (main victims); Anti-sectarianist Sunni Muslims; Ahmadiyya; Hindus; Christians; Sikhs; Other ethnic and religious communities in Pakistan; Terrorist and extremist groups: Tehrik-i-Taliban Pakistan; Tehreek-e-Nafaz-e-Shariat-e-Mohammadi; Tehreek-e-Jihad Pakistan; Tariq Gidar Group; Hafiz Gul Bahadur Group; Fedayeen al-Islam (until 2010); Jaish-e-Fursan-e-Muhammad Group; Punjabi Taliban (until 2014); Ansar ul-Mujahideen; Jamaat-ul-Ahrar; Ahrar-ul-Hind; East Turkestan Islamic Movement (the group lost territories in 2015 & active until 2017 in Waziristan); Islamic Jihad Union (until 2025); TLP (2016–2025); Hizb ut-Tahrir; Lashkar-e-Omar (until 2002); Haji Namdar Group (until 2008); Tariq Gidar Group (until 2017); Lashkar-e-Islam (until 2025); Jamaat-ul-Ahrar (until 2020); Ahrar-ul-Hind (until 2014); Jaish ul-Adl (against both Iran & Pakistan until 2026); Al-Qaeda; AQIS; Ansar Al-Furqan; Abdullah Azzam Brigade (until 2015); Ansarul Sharia Pakistan; Sipah-e-Sahaba Pakistan (until 2018); ASWJ (until 2021); Lashkar-e-Jhangvi (until 2024); Baloch separatist groups: Baloch Raaji Aajoi Sangar; BLA; Majeed Brigade; Fateh Squad; BLF; LeB (inactive); BLUF (2009-2010); BSO (Azad) (inactive); BNA (2022–23); BRA (2006–22); UBA (2013–22); Other Baloch Separatist groups; Islamic State-Aligned groups: Islamic Movement of Uzbekistan (until 2015); Jundallah (until 2014); Tehreek-e-Khilafat (from 2014); Wilayat Khorasan (from 2015); Islamic State – Pakistan Province; Muhajir nationalist groups: (until 2025): MQM-L (until 2016); Good Friends; Sector Commanders (until 2016); Nadeem Commando (1990–96); Faheem Commando (1990–95); (no border) MQM-H (until 1992); Pro-Sindhudesh Sindhi nationalist groups: Baloch Raaji Aajoi Sangar; Sindhudesh Revolutionary Army; Sindhudesh Liberation Army; Sindhudesh People's Army; Jeay Sindh Qaumi Mahaz; Jeay Sindh Students' Federation	Ongoing	Division of Shia Islamists between Pro-Khomeinism (favourable to Iran's Axis of Resistance) and Pro-Shariatmadari (critic to the Iranian Revolution), provocating a Rrivalry between Sipah-e-Sahaba Pakistan and Tehreek-e-Jaferia Pakistan.; Pakistani Taliban announced re-insurgency in Pakistan.
Iranian Embassy siege (1980)	Iran United Kingdom	Democratic Revolutionary Front for the Liberation of Arabistan (DRFLA)	Victory	Embassy recaptured after six-day siege
Tanker War (1981−1988): Action of June 5, 1984; Operation Earnest Will; Operation Prime Chance; Operation Praying Mantis; part of Iran–Iraq War	Iran Supported by: Pakistan	Iraq Supported by: United States; Saudi Arabia; Kuwait	Inconclusive	UNSCR 598
Multinational Force in Lebanon (1982–1984): Part of Lebanese Civil War	Islamic Jihad Organization Iran Ba'athist Syria Progressive Socialist Party Amal Movement	United States; France; Italy; United Kingdom	Stalemate	Syrian Allied victory: Multinational forces fail to prevent collapse of Lebanese Army into Syrian- or Israeli- supported militias; Multinational forces evacuated after the US embassy and US Marine barracks are bombed by the Islamic Jihad Organization; Multinational forces oversee withdrawal of Palestine Liberation Organization; Humanitarian crisis in southern Lebanon; Civil war continues until 1990; President Hafez al-Assad continues his occupation of Lebanon until his son and later president Bashar al-Assad orders a withdrawal from the country
Second Sudanese Civil War (1983–2005): Part of Sudanese Civil Wars	Sudan: Armed Forces; PDF; Army of Peace; Muraheleen; (Rwanda) Ex-FAR and Interahamwe; SSDF SPLA dissidents: SPLA-Nasir; SPLA-United; SSIM/A; Nuer White Army (Uganda) Ugandan insurgents: LRA; WNBF; UNRF (II); Zaire (1994–1997) al-Qaeda (1991–1996) Iraq (Note: Iraqi support for Sudan during the war mostly consisted of weapons shipments; according to the South Sudanese, however, at least one unit of Iraqi paratroopers fought alongside the SAF near Juba. About 200 Iraqi soldiers were allegedly killed, and the site of their remains became known as "Jebel Iraqi". The International Institute for Strategic Studies also stated that Iraqi forces fought alongside Sudanese government troops.) China (Note: Although China was not officially involved in the war, it sent troops to the country in order to protect oil fields and thereby aid the Sudanese military. China also provided Sudan with weaponry.) Combat aid: Libya (1986–1991) DR Congo (1998–2003) Non-combat aid: Iran Belarus (from 1996)	SPLA: SPLA-Mainstream; SPLA-Agar; SPDF; ALF; Titweng; SSLM NDA Sudanese Alliance Forces Anyanya II Eastern Coalition Derg (until 1987) PDR Ethiopia (1987–1991) FDR Ethiopia (1995–1998) Eritrea (1996–1998, 2002–2005) Uganda (from 1993) Non-combat aid: Libya (1983–1985) Israel Cuba (until 1991)	Stalemate	Comprehensive Peace Agreement
1983–1986 Kurdish rebellions in Iraq: Part of Iran–Iraq War and Iraqi–Kurdish conflict	KDP Supported by: Iran PUK Kurdish mujahideen	Iraq	Stalemate	Long term Kurdish tactical failure
Iran–Israel proxy conflicts (1985−present): Hezbollah–Israel conflict; Karine A affair; Francop Affair; 2009 Sudan airstrikes; Victoria Affair; 2012 Israeli operation in the Gaza Strip; Iran–Israel conflict during the Syrian civil war; Israeli–Syrian ceasefire line incidents during the Syrian civil war; Operation Full Disclosure; Operation Northern Shield; 2019 Israeli airstrikes in Iraq; 2021 Israel–Palestine crisis; 2022 Erbil missile attacks; 2023 Iran drone attacks; 2023 Israel–Lebanon shellings; 2024 Iranian missile strikes in Iraq and Syria; part of the post–Cold War era, the Arab–Israeli conflict, the Iran–Saudi Arabia proxy conflict, and the Iran–Turkey proxy conflict	Iran Proxies: Hezbollah; Hamas (2006–2011; 2017–present); Popular Front for the Liberation of Palestine (PFLP) (2013–present); Palestinian Islamic Jihad (PIJ); Popular Front for the Liberation of Palestine – General Command (PFLP–GC) (2013–present); Sabireen Movement (until 2019); Houthis; / Popular Mobilization Units; National Defence Forces (until 2024); Islamic Resistance in Iraq; Liwa Fatemiyoun; Husseiniyoun; Liwa Zainebiyoun; Al-Ashtar Brigades; Support: Syria (until 2024)	Israel Proxies: South Lebanon Army (until 2000); Fursan al-Joulan (2013–19); Popular Forces of Palestine (2024–present); Support: United States; United Kingdom (Operation Iron Shield only); France (Operation Iron Shield only)	Ongoing	Ongoing: Iran reinforces Syria and Hezbollah; Iranian support for Hamas is consolidated; Israel tries to prevent weapon transfers to Hezbollah; 2006 Lebanon War ends in military stalemate and Israeli withdrawal; Beginning of the ongoing Gaza–Israel conflict in June 2006; Israel tries to stop the Iranian nuclear program; Iran grows major spheres of influence in the Middle East; Formation of the Arab–Israeli alliance and the Abraham Accords; Iran provides munitions to Hamas and Palestinian Islamic Jihad (PIJ) in the Gaza Strip; Escalation to a direct conflict between the two countries in 2024 and 2025
War of Brothers (1988–1990): Part of Lebanese Civil War	Hezbollah: Lebanese Islamic Resistance; Supported by: Iran	Amal Movement: Lebanese Resistance Regiments; Supported by: Syria	Inconclussive	Reconciliation between the two parties.
Afghan Civil War (1989–1992): Part of the Cold War, Revolutions of 1989, Dissolution of the Soviet Union, and Afghan conflict	Afghan Mujahideen; Jamiat-e Islami; Hezb-e Islami Gulbuddin (until July 1989); National Islamic Front of Afghanistan; Ittehad-e Islami; Hezb-i Islami Khalis; Harakat-i Inqilab-i Islami; Independent Factions: Khalq (1990); Hezb-e Islami Gulbuddin (from July 1989) (Afghanistan) Junbish-i Milli (from 1992); Foreign Fighters: Al Qaeda; Maktab al-Khidamat; Various factions also fought among each other Pakistan Saudi Arabia Turkey United States United Kingdom China Germany Iran	Government of Afghanistan Supported by: Soviet Union (until 1991); Commonwealth of Independent States (from 1991); Tajikistan; Turkmenistan; Uzbekistan; India	Victory	Dissolution of the Homeland Party Government; The Peshawar Accord leads to the creation of the Islamic State of Afghanistan on 28 April 1992; Continued civil war among Mujahideen forces
1991 Iraqi uprisings: Part of the aftermath of the Gulf War	Shia and leftist elements of opposition: SCIRI/Badr Brigades; Dawa; Communist Party; (Iraq) Pro-Syrian Ba'athists; (Iraq) Army deserters/defectors; Kurdish rebels: Peshmerga: KDP; PUK; IMK; CPK; (Iraq) Jash deserters/defectors; PDKI; Diplomatic support: United States Military support: Iran	Ba'athist Iraq: Ba'ath Party; (Iraq) Iraqi Army; Republican Guard; Special Republican Guard; Popular Army; General Security; Intelligence Service; Special Security; Support: MEK	Iraqi government military victory	Establishment of Kurdistan Region, facilitated by the imposition of the Iraqi no-fly zones by United States, United Kingdom and France.; Iraqi Kurdish gets Kurdistan Region.
Bosnian War (1992–1995): Part of Yugoslav Wars	Bosnia and Herzegovina Military Support: Iran (alleged): Quds Force; Herzeg-Bosnia Croatia	Republika Srpska Serbian Krajina SFR Yugoslavia (until 1992) Western Bosnia	Stalemate	Breakup of Yugoslavia: International recognition of Bosnia and Herzegovina as a sovereign state.; Republika Srpska federates with Bosnia-Herzegovina.
Algerian Civil War (1992–2002): part of Arab Cold War and Algeria–Morocco rivalry	Islamic Salvation Front loyalists Morocco Libya (until 1995) Saudi Arabia (pre-war) Saudi private donors Armed Islamic Group (from 1993) Minor involvement: Sudan (alleged) Iran (alleged) Egyptian Islamic Jihad (until 1995) Salafist Group for Preaching and Combat (from 1998) Minor involvement: Al-Qaeda	Government of Algeria Minor involvement: Egypt Tunisia France European Union South Africa	Defeat	Algerian Government victory over the islamists.
Afghan Civil War (1992–1996): Part of the Afghan conflict, and Iran-Taliban conflict, Iran-Al Qaeda conflict and the Iran–Saudi Arabia proxy conflict	Hezb-i Wahdat (Dec. 1992–1995) Supported by: Iran (Dec. 1992–1995) Junbish-i Milli (Jan.–Aug. 1994) Supported by: Uzbekistan (Jan.–Aug. 1994) Islamic State of Afghanistan List: (Afghanistan) Northern Alliance; Jamiat-e Islami; NIFA; (Afghanistan) IDOA; (Afghanistan) Harakat-i Islami; Junbish-i Milli (until Jan. 1994; from Aug. 1994); Hezb-i Wahdat (from 1995); (Afghanistan) Shura-e Nazar; Hezb-e Islami Khalis (until mid-1992); INRMA (Afghanistan) ANFL (Jeebh-e Nejat-e Melli) Hezb-e Islami Gulbuddin (from late 1994) Supported by: Saudi Arabia Uzbekistan (until Jan. 1994; from Aug. 1994) Iran (until Dec. 1992: from 1995)	Afghan Army and Airforce Remnants (allegedly, until October 1992) Regional Kandahar Militia Leaders Hezb-e Islami Gulbuddin (until late 1994) Supported by: Pakistan (until late 1994) Taliban (from late 1994) Al-Qaeda (from early 1996) Supported by: Pakistan (from late 1994)	Stalemate	Inconclussive: Taliban take control of Kabul and most of Afghanistan; Islamic Emirate of Afghanistan established; Civil war continues (1996–2001)
Tajikistani Civil War (1992–1997): part of the post-Soviet conflicts and spillover of the Afghan Civil War (1992–1996)	United Tajik Opposition; Islamic Renaissance Party; Tajik Democratic Party; Party of People's Unity; Rastokhez Popular Movement; Lali Badakhshan; Afghanistan (until 1996): Jamiat-e Islami (until 1996); Supported by: al-Qaeda; (al-Qaeda) Islamic Movement of Uzbekistan; Taliban; Iran (alleged, denied by Iran)	/Tajikistan; Popular Front of Tajikistan; Communist Party of Tajikistan; Socialist Party of Tajikistan; /Russia; Uzbekistan /Kazakhstan /Kyrgyzstan Supported by: Belarus (weapons supplies); UNMOT: Austria; Bangladesh; Bulgaria; Czech Republic; Denmark; Ghana; Hungary; Indonesia; Jordan; Nepal; Nigeria; Poland; Switzerland; Ukraine; Uruguay	Defeat	Armistice
Iraqi Kurdish Civil War (1994–1997): Part of Iraqi–Kurdish conflict	PUK PKK SCIRI KCP Iraqi National Congress Supported by: Iran (from 1995) (Ba'athist Syria) Syria United States (1996)	KDP PDKI Supported by: Iraq (from 1995) Turkey (from 1997) Iran (before 1995)	Stalemate	Washington Agreement: PKK moved to Qandil mountains from Bekaa Valle
Iran-Hezbollah terrorist attacks in Argentina (1992–1994): 1992 Buenos Aires Israeli embassy bombing; AMIA bombing; Part of Iranian external operations and South Lebanon conflict (1985–2000)	Iran Hezbollah: Ansar Allah	Argentina: Argentine Jews; Supported by: Israel	Victory	Iranian attacks were successful.
1999 Shia uprising in Iraq: Part of Prelude to the Iraq war	Rebels: SCIRI / Badr; Dawa; Supported by: Iran	Government of Iraq	Defeat	Saddamist victory.
Iraqi Kurdistan conflict (2001–2003): Part of the Iraqi no-fly zones conflict, Iraq War, Islamism in Kurdistan, and the war on terror	Islamic Emirate of Kurdistan; Ansar al-Islam; Kurdistan Islamic Group; Kurdistan Islamic Movement; Supported by: Iran (alleged by PUK) KDP (alleged by PUK)	Kurdistan Region; PUK; United States (armed involvement after Viking Hammer)	Defeat	Kurdistan Region–United States victory
War in Darfur (2003–2020): Part of Sudanese Civil Wars and Sudanese conflict in South Kordofan and Blue Nile	Sudan: SAF; Janjaweed; RSF; Chadian rebel groups Anti-Gaddafi forces (2011) Supported by: Libya (2011–2020) China Iran (until 2016) Russia Belarus Syria (2000s, alleged)	SRF (Note: Known as the National Redemption Front prior to 2011.) (2006–2020): JEM (2003–2020); SLA (some factions) (2003–2020); LJM (2010–11) (Note: Signed the Doha Darfur Peace Agreement in 2011.); SLA (some factions) SARC (2014–2020) SLFA (2017–2020): SLA-Unity; SLMJ; JEM (Jali); Supported by: South Sudan Chad (2005–2010) Eritrea (until 2008) Libya (until 2011) Uganda (until 2015) (United Nations) UNAMID (2007–2020)	Stalemate	Iran–Sudan relations improves against Western Bloc until breaking out in 2016 due to Sudanese intervention in the Yemeni civil war against Houthis.; Darfur Peace Agreement and South Sudan independence referendum.
Iraqi insurgency (2003-2011): Iranian involvement in the Iraq War; United States raid on the Iranian Liaison Office in Erbil; Karbala provincial headquarters raid; part of the Iraq War	United States; United Kingdom MNF–I (2003–09): United States (2003–09); United Kingdom (2003–09); Australia (2003–09); Romania (2003–09); Azerbaijan (2003–08); Kuwait (2003–08); Estonia (2003–09); El Salvador (2003–09); Bulgaria (2003–08); Moldova (2003–08); Albania (2003–08); Ukraine (2003–08); Denmark (2003–08); Czech Republic (2003–08); South Korea (2003–08); Singapore (2003–08); Croatia (2003–08); Bosnia and Herzegovina (2003–08); Republic of Macedonia (2003–08); Latvia (2003–08); Poland (2003–08); Kazakhstan (2003–08); Mongolia (2003–08); Georgia (2003–08); Tonga (2004–08); Japan (2004–08); Armenia (2005–08); Slovakia (2003–07); Lithuania (2003–07); Italy (2003–06); Norway (2003–06); Hungary (2003–05); Netherlands (2003–05); Portugal (2003–05); New Zealand (2003–04); Thailand (2003–04); Philippines (2003–04); Honduras (2003–04); Dominican Republic (2003–04); Spain (2003–04); Nicaragua (2003–04); Iceland (2003–unknown); New Iraqi government: Iraqi Armed Forces; Iraqi Police; Iraqi Kurdistan; Peshmerga; Sons of Iraq; Badr Organization Supported by: Iran: Artesh; Quds Force; NATO: NATO Training Mission – Iraq; Israel; United Nations: United Nations Security Council; United Nations Secretariat; United Nations Assistance Mission for Iraq	Ba'ath Party loyalists; Fedayeen Saddam (2003 Only); (Ba'athist Iraq) Supreme Command for Jihad and Liberation (from 2007); (Ba'athist Iraq) Naqshbandi Army (from 2006); Supported by: Syria; Sunni insurgents; Al-Qaeda; Al-Qaeda in Iraq (2004–06); Islamic State of Iraq (from 2006); Islamic Army in Iraq; Ansar al-Sunnah (2003–07); Iraqi Islamic Resistance Army; other smaller groups; Several Sunni Tribes; Shia insurgents; Mahdi Army (2003–2008); Special Groups; Kata'ib Hezbollah; Asa'ib Ahl al-Haq; Promised Day Brigades (from 2008); other smaller groups; Several Shia Tribes; Supported by: Iran; Iranian Army; Quds Force	Inconclusive	Inconclusive: 2003–2006 insurgency phase deteriorates into 2006–2008 civil war; 20,000+ additional American soldiers deployed to Iraq to quell violence in troop surge of 2007; Coalition failure to defeat Iraqi insurgency; End of American military presence in Iraq with 2007–2011 withdrawal; Continued Iraqi conflict
Houthi insurgency (2004–2014): Operation Scorched Earth; part of the Yemeni crisis and the Iran–Saudi Arabia proxy conflict	Houthi Movement Yemen (pro-Saleh forces) Alleged support by: Iran; North Korea; Libya (until 2011)	Yemen: Security Forces; Sunni tribes; Al-Islah militias; Saudi Arabia Supported by: Jordan; Morocco al-Qaeda: Ansar al-Sharia	Houthi victory	Houthi victory: Conflict escalates into a full-scale civil war with the Yemeni government and foreign intervention; Houthi rebels take over Sa'dah and establish an independent administration in Sa'dah Governorate and parts of 'Amran, Al Jawf and Hajjah.; Houthis take control of Sanaa; Yemeni government under President Hadi relocated from Sanaa to Aden; Iran-Morocco relations diplomatic relations are severed.
2004 Iranian seizure of Royal Navy personnel (2004)	(Iran) Navy of the Army of the Guardians of the Islamic Revolution (Iran) Iranian Border Guard Command	(United Kingdom) British Royal Navy	Victory	Victory: British naval personnel arrested; 3 patrol boats seized
2005 Ahvaz unrest (2005): part of Arab separatism in Khuzestan	Iranian Government	Iranian Arabs	Victory	Unrest quelled
Fatah–Hamas conflict (2006–present): Part of Palestinian internal political violence	Hamas; (Palestine) Gaza Strip (after June 2007); (Palestine) Hamas/PJOR-affiliated groups in the West Bank (from 2022); Supported by: Iran; (Palestine) Palestinian Joint Operations Room	Fatah; (Palestine) Palestinian Authority; Fatah-affiliated groups in the Gaza Strip (from 2025); Supported by: Israel	Ongoing	Fatah–Hamas reconciliation process: Hamas takeover of the Gaza Strip; New Palestinian government in the West Bank
U.S. raid on the Iranian Liaison Office in Erbil (2007): part of Iraq War	Iran Iraqi Kurdistan	United States	Defeat	Iranian diplomats captured by the US; Iranian retaliatory raids against the US
2007 Iranian arrest of Royal Navy personnel (2007)	Navy of the Islamic Revolutionary Guard Corps; Border Guard Command	Royal Navy	Victory	Two British boats seized; 15 Royal Navy personnel captured
Iranian Anti-piracy measures in Somalia (2008–present): part of Piracy in Somalia, war on terror and Somali Civil War	Somalia; UN; Iran; China; India; Russia; Arab League; Israel; NATO; European Union; Japan; South Korea; SADC	Somali pirates	Ongoing	
Iran's incursions against the MEK in Iraq (2009–2013): 2011 raid on Camp Ashraf; 2013 Camp Ashraf massacre; Part of Iraqi conflict	Iran Iraq	MEK Supported by: US	Victory	The People's Mojahedin Organization of Iran is disarticulated in Iraq, fleeing to Albania.
Sixth Sa'dah War (2009–2010): Part of Yemeni crisis and Iran–Saudi Arabia proxy conflict	Houthis Alleged support: Iran: Quds Force; Hezbollah	Yemen Hashed tribesmen Saudi Arabia Alleged support: Morocco Jordan	Stalemate	Ceasefire after rebels accepted the government's truce conditions.
Somali Civil War (2009–present)	Al-Qaeda and allies; Al-Shabaab; AQAP; AQIM; Hizbul Islam (until 2010; 2012–2013) Alleged state allies: Eritrea; Iran; Quds Force; Qatar; Alleged non-state allies: Houthis Somali pirates: Islamic State (since 2015); Somalia Wilayah; Allies: IS-YP Somali pirates	Somalia; Somali Armed Forces; Regional forces: Galmudug; Galmudug Security Force; Ahlu Sunna Waljama'a (until 2018); (Somalia) Ma'awisley; Hirshabelle; Khatumo; Southwestern Somalia; Himan and Heeb (until 2015); United States: U.S. Army; U.S. Marine Corps; U.S. Air Force; U.S. Navy; CIA; AFRICOM; China: People's Armed Police; Turkey: Turkish Land Forces; AUSSOM (2025–present): Burundi (under discussion); Djibouti; Egypt (under discussion); Ethiopia; Kenya; Uganda; ATMIS (2022–2024): Burundi; Djibouti; Ethiopia; Kenya; Uganda; AMISOM (2007–2022): Burundi; Djibouti; Ethiopia; Ghana; Kenya; Nigeria; Sierra Leone; Uganda; Supported by: France Italy Russia UAE United Kingdom Non-combat support: European Union; EUTM Somalia; (United Nations) UNPOS (1995–2013) (United Nations) UNSOM (2013–2024): Brazil; Finland; Germany; Ghana; India; Indonesia; Nepal; Sierra Leone; Sweden; Thailand; Turkey; Uganda; United Kingdom; Zimbabwe; (United Nations) UNTMIS (2025–present) (United Nations) UNSOA (2009–2016) (United Nations) UNSOS (2016–present) Council for Somalia's Future Puntland: Puntland Security Force; Puntland Dervish Force; Puntland Maritime Police Force; Jubaland: Jubaland Dervish Force; Raskamboni Movement; Somaliland; Somaliland Armed Forces; SSB; Alleged support: Ethiopia United Arab Emirates	Ongoing	
2010 South Kyrgyzstan ethnic clashes: Part of Kyrgyz Revolution of 2010 and Post-Soviet conflicts	Kyrgyzstan provisional government Supported by: Turkmenistan; Iran; Kazakhstan; China; Russia; Turkey; United States	Kyrgyzstani Kyrgyz gangs; Pro-Bakiyev Kyrgyz; Other pro-Bakiyev forces; Tajik PMCs; Tajikstani Tajiks; Russian Tajiks; Other mercenaries; Uzbekistani Kyrgyz civilians; Sokh Uzbekistani Kyrgyz; Sogment Uzbekistani Kyrgyz; Islamic Movement of Uzbekistan (alleged); Kyrgyzstani Uzbek gangs; Pro-provisional government civilians; Uzbekistani Uzbek civilians; Sokh Uzbekistani Uzbeks; Sogment Uzbekistani Uzbeks; Supported by: Uzbekistan (limited involv.)	Stalemate	Bishkek government regains partial control over southern provinces; limited exodus of the Uzbek minority; Uzbek language suppressed in public life
Insurgency in Bahrain (2011–present): part of 2011 Bahraini uprising and the Iran–Saudi Arabia proxy conflict	Bahraini opposition Supported by: Iran	Bahrain Supported by: Peninsula Shield Force: Saudi Arabia; United Arab Emirates; Kuwait	Ongoing	Ongoing
Iran–Turkey proxy conflict (2011–present): PKK insurgency in the Kurdistan Region; Kurdish Hezbollah insurgency; 2019 Turkish offensive into north-eastern Syria; Operation Claw-Sword; 2021 Shia militia attacks on Turkey; Turkish–Syrian National Army offensive in Northern Syria (2024–2025); part of the Iran–Israel proxy conflict and the Iran–Saudi Arabia proxy conflict	Iran Proxies: Kurdistan Workers' Party; PUK; Kurdish Hezbollah; Sinjar Alliance; Hezbollah; (Iraq) Popular Mobilization Forces; Islamic Resistance in Iraq; Houthi movement; Husayniyun; (Libya) Libyan House of Representatives (sometimes); Muslim Brotherhood (sometimes); Hamas (Axis of Resistance); Support: Armenia; Russia; Syria (until 2024); Iraq (sometimes); (Democratic Autonomous Administration of North and East Syria) Rojava (sometimes); India (sometimes)	Turkey Proxies: Syrian National Army; (Libya) Government of National Accord; (Libya) Libyan House of Representatives (sometimes); (Yemen) Presidential Leadership Council; GAMOH; AMDT; JAMAH; Iraqi Turkmen Front; National Council of Resistance of Iran; KDP; KDPI (1993–1995); Komala (1993–1995); Muslim Brotherhood (sometimes); Hamas (sometimes); Support: Azerbaijan; Libya; Palestinian Authority; Qatar; Syria (since 2024); United Kingdom; United States; Lebanon (sometimes); NATO	Ongoing	Ongoing
2011 attack on the British Embassy in Iran	United Kingdom: Embassy at Tehran; Iran	Anti-Western civilian protesters	Stalemate	Defense of the Embassy is reinforced and Iranian government condemns the attacks.
2011–2012 Strait of Hormuz dispute (2011–2012)	Iran	United States; United Kingdom; France; Australia	Stalemate	Iran threatens to close the Strait of Hormuz; Multi-national flotilla established in Persian Gulf and Arabian Sea off coast of Iran; EU sanctions enforced, banning the export of oil from Iran to the EU countries and freezing Iranian assets
Mali War (2012–present): Part of the War in the Sahel, war on terror and the War against the Islamic State	2012–2013 Mali 2013–2022/23: Mali; France; MINUSMA (Note: MINUSMA, the United Nations Multidimensional Integrated Stabilization Mission in Mali, replaced and absorbed the troops from the AFISMA. It included troops from Chad, Bangladesh, Senegal, Togo, Egypt, Burkina Faso, Niger, Ivory Coast, Guinea, Germany, China, Benin, among others); Chad (2013 only); Wagner Group (from 2021); Supported by: (European Union) EUTM Mali Others: Angola; Australia; Belgium; Canada; Denmark; Germany; India; Iran; Italy; Japan; Namibia; Netherlands; Spain; United Arab Emirates; United Kingdom; United States; 2023–present: Mali; Russia (2024–present); Africa Corps; Wagner Group (until 2025); Support: North Korea; Native militia (2014–present): Platform; MPSA; Ganda Iso; MAA Loyalists; MSA (2019–present); GATIA (2019–23); 2015–23: CSP (from 2021); CMA; Platform (from 2021)	2012: MNLA; Al-Qaeda; AQIM; Ansaru; Ansar Dine; MOJWA; Boko Haram; 2012–15: CMA (from 2014); MNLA; HCUA (from 2013); MAA-D (from 2013); 2023–24: CSP; CMA; GATIA (al-Mahmoud faction); 2024–present FLA Supported by: Ukraine 2012–present: CMI (2017–present); MAA (until 2013); Other armed groups and self-defense militias; 2012–2017: Al-Qaeda; AQIM; Al-Mourabitoun (from 2015); Ansaru (until 2013); Ansar Dine; MLF (from 2016); MOJWA (until 2013); Boko Haram (until 2013); 2017–present: Al-Qaeda; JNIM; 2015–2019: IS; ISSP; 2019–present: IS; ISSP	Ongoing	
Jordanian-Syrian border conflict (2012–2018)	Syria Hezbollah Supported by: Iran Russia Islamic State: Khalid ibn al-Walid Army	Jordan (Syrian opposition) Free Syrian Army Supported by: United States Ahrar al-Sham Hay'at Tahrir al-Sham	Defeat	Jordan restores control over the Jordanian-Syrian border; Syrian government loses a majority of the borders; All infiltration attempts into Jordan foiled.
Libyan civil war (2014–2020): Part of the Arab Winter, the Libyan crisis, the Iran–Saudi Arabia proxy war, the war on terror, and the Qatar–Saudi Arabia diplomatic conflict, War against the Islamic State and the Insurgency in the Maghreb (2002–present)	House of Representatives (Tobruk-based): Libyan National Army; Libyan Air Force (LNA–aligned); Libyan Navy (LNA–aligned); Others: Zintan brigades; JEM (from 2016); SLM/A-Minnawi; Gaddafi loyalists; Popular Front for the Liberation of Libya; Warshefana militias; Wagner Group (from 2018) Egypt United Arab Emirates RSF (from 2019) Ba'athist Syria (2020) Hezbollah (allegedly) Israel (allegedly, denied by LNA) Iran Support: Russia; France; Saudi Arabia; Chad; Jordan; Belarus; Greece; Cyprus; United States; United Kingdom	Government of National Accord (Tripoli-based) (from 2015): Libyan Ground Forces; Libyan Air Force (GNA–aligned); Libyan Navy (GNA–aligned); Others: Presidential Guard; Misrata Brigades; Sabratha Revolutionary Brigades; Petroleum Facilities Guard; Tripoli Protection Force (from 2018); Misratan Third Force; Tuareg militias of Ghat; Toubou Front for the Salvation of Libya; Chadian rebels (FACT, CCMSR, URF and UFDD); Turkey (2020) (Syrian opposition) Syrian National Army (from 2019) (Yemen) Popular Resistance Committees Hamas (LNA claim, denied by Hamas) Support: Qatar; Sudan (until 2019); Pakistan; Iran; Morocco; Malta; Italy; European Union (except Greece, Cyprus and France); United Kingdom; United States (until 2019); Ukraine; Algeria; United Nations; National Salvation Government (2014–2017): Libya Dawn Coalition; Libya Shield Force; LROR; Libyan National Guard; Support: Sudan (2014–16); Turkey (2014–16); Qatar (2014–16); Iran (allegedly); Ukraine; Islamic State (from 2014): Wilayat Libya; Support: AQIM (2014–2015; alleged in 2016); Al-Qaeda: Al-Qaeda in the Islamic Maghreb; Al-Mourabitoun (2015-2018); Shura Council of Benghazi Revolutionaries (2014–2017) SCBR militia: Ansar al-Sharia (2014–2017); Libya Shield 1 (2014–16); Rafallah al-Sahati Brigade; February 17th Martyrs Brigade; Others: Shura Council of Mujahideen in Derna (until 2018); (Libya) Benghazi Defense Brigades (2016); Ajdabiya Revolutionaries Shura Council (2015–16); (Libya) Derna Protection Force (2018-2019)	Stalemate	Ceasefire: Iran and Saudi Arabia develops a rivalry concerning the militar support for Khalifa Haftar until 2020.; Iran withdraws due to lack of interest. Then diplomatically supports the Turkish intervention in Libya (2020–present) after the end of the civil war and the formation of the Government of National Unity.
Iran's operations against the MEK in Albania (2016–ongoing): 2023 Raid on Camp Ashraf; Part of Iranian external operations	Iran Albania	MEK	Ongoing	Ongoing.
2016 U.S.–Iran naval incident (2016)	Iran	United States	Inconclusive	Sailors released unharmed 15 hours later after negotiations
Marco Polo operation (2017–Present): Part of Iranian external operations	Iran Local Criminals	Jewish lobby in Europe Supported by: Israel Iranian opposition diaspora France Germany	Ongoing	The European Investigative Collaborations since 2023 starts an investigation of criminal networks contracted by Iran's terrorist cells, being arrested two attackers in 2024 by France–Germany collaboration.
2017 Iraqi–Kurdish conflict (2017)	Iraq Supported by: Iran	(Kurdistan Region) Kurdistan Regional Government PKK PDKI PAK White Flags (alleged)	Victory	Iraqi government forces defeat the Peshmerga and capture 20% of the territory controlled by the Kurdistan Region including the city of Kirkuk, along with the surrounding oil fields and border crossings.
Eastern Syria insurgency (2017–present): Part of the Rojava conflict, the Syrian civil war and the Syrian conflict	Islamic State; Wilayat al-Sham; (Ba'athist Syria) Assad loyalists; Supported by: Ba'athist Syria (surrendered); Iran (alleged, until 6 December 2024) (surrendered): Iraq (alleged); Syria (since 2024); Syrian Armed Forces; (Syrian opposition) Syrian National Army (until 2025); (Syrian opposition) Ahrar al-Sharqiya; Gathering of the Eastern Martyrs; Harakat al-Qiyam; Revolutionaries in the Land of Deir ez-Zor; Special Tasks Battalion; Pro-opposition tribes; Anti-SDF Arab tribes: Arab Tribal and Clan Forces; Supported by: Turkey Hurras al-Din (al-Qaeda loyalists, until 2025)	Democratic Autonomous Administration of North and East Syria; Syrian Democratic Forces; Self-Defence Forces (HXP); Internal Security Forces (Asayish); Pro-SDF Arab tribes; CJTF–OIR; United States; France; United Kingdom; Canada; Germany; Saudi Arabia; Kurdistan Workers' Party (PKK, claimed by Turkey, ISIL and the Popular Resistance)	Ongoing	Inconclusive
2018 attack on the Iranian Embassy in London (2018)	Iran; United Kingdom	The Mahdi Servants Union	Victory	Attackers were arrested
Palestinian Authority–West Bank militias conflict (2022–present): Part of Palestinian internal political violence and the Iran–Israel proxy conflict	Palestinian Islamic Jihad; Al-Aqsa Martyrs' Brigades; Hamas; Supported by: Iran	Palestinian Authority; leadership; Supported by: Israel; United States	Ongoing	Escalation in clashes during the Gaza war
2022 Iran–Greece naval incident (2022)	Iran Supported by: Russia	Greece Supported by: European Union United States	Inconclusive	The Greek seizure was lifted.
Russo-Ukrainian war (2022–present): Iran and the Russo-Ukrainian war (2022–present); Ukrainian attack on Iranian commercial vessel; Part of Post-soviet conflicts	Russia: Donetsk PR (Note: The Donetsk People's Republic and the Luhansk People's Republic were Russian puppet states that declared their independence from Ukraine in May 2014. In 2022, they received international recognition from each other, Russia, Syria and North Korea, and some other partially recognised states. On 30 September 2022, Russia declared that it had formally annexed both entities. They continue to exist as republics of Russia.); Luhansk PR; Supported by: Belarus (Note: In 2022, Belarus allowed Russia to use its territory to launch the invasion and to launch missiles into Ukraine.); North Korea; Iran (alleged, denied by Iran)	Ukraine Supported by: Military aid to Ukraine	Ongoing	Territorial control during the Russo-Ukrainian war. Iran denied any involvement in the war.
Sudanese civil war (2023–present): Iranian intervention in Sudan; Part of Sudanese Civil Wars	Sudanese government; Sudanese Armed Forces; PDF; Popular Resistance; Al-Bara Battalion; AWB; SPLM-N (Agar); JEM; SLM (Minnawi); SLM (Tambour) (from August 2023); Darfur Joint Protection Force (from November 2023) Egypt Supported by: Ukraine; Turkey; Iran; Saudi Arabia	(Sudan) Government of Peace and Unity (from April 2025); Rapid Support Forces; Non-RSF Janjaweed militias; SPLM-N (al-Hilu) (from February 2025); Tamazuj (from August 2023) Libyan National Army (Colombia) Desert Wolves Supported by: United Arab Emirates; (Russia) Wagner Group; Chad (alleged); SLM (al-Nur) SPLM-N (al-Hilu) (June 2023 – February 2025)	Ongoing	Iran–Sudan relations are restored and Iranian-Houthi Sphere of influence is expanded in the Red Sea.
The Sunflower case (2023): Part of Iranian external operations	Iran	Politicians related to Vox Supported by: Iranian opposition diaspora Spain Netherlands	Defeat	
Attacks on US bases during the Middle Eastern crisis (2023–present): Part of the Iran–Israel proxy conflict, the Middle Eastern crisis (2023–present), the 2024 Syrian opposition offensives and the Eastern Syria insurgency in the Syrian civil war	Iran Ba'athist Syria (until 2024) Proxies: Islamic Resistance in Iraq Syrian Hezbollah Liwa Fatemiyoun Popular Mobilization Forces	United States; United Kingdom; Supported by: Jordan (Democratic Autonomous Administration of North and East Syria) Rojava (Syrian opposition) Al-Tanf Garrison	Ongoing	Current stalemate. The US withdraws from Hemo base in Northeastern Syria.
2024 Iranian operations inside Australia (2024): Melbourne synagogue attack; Part of Antisemitism in Australia and Iranian external operations	Iran (alleged)	Australia: Jewish Australians; Supported by: Israel	Defeat	The terrorist perpetrators were arrested and the Australia–Iran embassies were closed.
Syrian conflict (2024–present): Arab tribal insurgency in Eastern Syria; Western Syria clashes; Hezbollah–Syria clashes (2024–present); Syria in the 2026 Iran war	(Ba'athist Syria) Assadist insurgents; Syrian Popular Resistance; (Ba'athist Syria) Military Council for the Liberation of Syria; (Ba'athist Syria) Coastal Shield Brigade; (Ba'athist Syria) Saraya al-Jawad; (Ba'athist Syria) Fawj Azra'il al-Jabal; Hezbollah; Eastern Lebanese tribes; Supported by: Iran (alleged); Alawite protesters; Supreme Alawite Islamic Council	Syria (Note: Caretaker government until 29 March; Transitional government from 29 March); Counter protesters Supported by: Jordan Turkey Arab Tribal and Clan Forces Northern Syria Supported by: Kurdistan Workers' Party ISIL Saraya Ansar al-Sunnah Israel Druze militias	Ongoing	Current stalemate.
2025 Iraq drone attacks	Popular Mobilization Forces (alleged): Islamic Resistance in Iraq; Iran (alleged)	Iraq (Kurdistan Region) Kurdistan United States	Ongoing	Successful attack on Foreign military facilities and oil refineries.
2026 Kurdish–Iranian crisis: Part of Kurdish separatism in Iran, the 2025–2026 Iranian protests and the 2026 Iran war	Iran; Axis of Resistance; Popular Mobilization Forces; Islamic Resistance in Iraq; Saraya Awliya al-Dam	(Kurdistan Region) Coalition of Political Forces of Iranian Kurdistan (CPFIK): Kurdistan Democratic Party of Iran; Kurdistan Freedom Party; Kurdistan Free Life Party; Organization of Iranian Kurdistan Struggle; Komala of the Toilers of Kurdistan; Komala Party of Iranian Kurdistan; Supported by: United States (alleged); Israel (alleged)	Ongoing	Limited insurgency during the protests; Spillover into the Kurdistan Region of Iraq; Speculations about a US-backed Kurdish offensive

== See also ==
- List of wars involving Iran (before 1979)
- History of Iran
- Greater Iran
- List of massacres in Iran
- Hybrid warfare against Iran
- Cyberwarfare and Iran
- List of Iranian assassinations
- Iranian influence operations in the UK
- The policy of exporting the Islamic Revolution
- New Great Game
