= Separatism in Iran =

Various separatists movements in Iran

There are several separatist movements in Iran, most of which are associated with a particular minority ethnic group. Iran is a highly diverse country: in 2015, it was estimated that Persians―Iran's dominant ethnic group―only made up about 61% of the Iranian population.

Some researchers believe that Iran's ethnic divisions present a viable threat to the country. They argue that the economically disenfranchisement of ethnic minorities, combined with policies to limit political, social, and cultural rights, promote further unrest. A 2005 report by Amnesty International found that the Iranian government supported policies that economically disenfranchised ethnic minorities and limit their political, social, and cultural rights.

Other researchers argue that the ethnic divide in Iran is overstated, pointing to a study which found that many people in Iran identify with more than one ethnic group.

== Khuzestan province ==
Khuzestan is a region in the southwest which is inhabited by Khuzestani Arabs, who comprise about 33% of its population. Arabs have lived the area that now consists of the Khuzestan province before it was conquered by the Rashidun Caliphate in the 7th century. Arab immigration continued during the Safavid and Qajar eras. These dynasties were not concerned with the language spoken in the region, and the region was not economically important until the early 20th century. Supported by the British, Khuzestan was semi-autonomous until it became occupied by Pahlavi Iran in 1924. It was then fully incorporated into Iran, and the Iranian government tried to Persianize the region, changing place names from Arabic to Persian. Several periods of unrest and insurgency took place in the region during the 21st century, including protests and an attack on the Revolutionary Guard in 2018.

Groups like the Democratic Solidarity Party of Al-Ahwaz (which is a member of the Unrepresented Nations and Peoples Organization) advocate for Khuzestan's independence under the name Ahwaz. Militant organization advocating for Khuzestani independence include the National Liberation Movement of Ahwaz and the Arab Struggle Movement for the Liberation of Ahwaz.

=== Arrests ===
The Public Security Police of Ahvaz, Iran, conducted intelligence operations to identify and arrest one of the leaders of separatist groups active in cyberspace, along with another related individual. Iran's Ministry of Intelligence announced in a statement: The main perpetrator of the Ahvaz military parade attack has been identified and arrested.

== Kurdistan ==
Historians debate when Kurdish separatism began to emerge, but most agree that it emerged as an ideology sometime in the early 20th century. Following the Anglo-Soviet invasion of Iran during World War II, the Soviet Union established the Republic of Mahabad, an unrecognized puppet state under which Kurdish nationalist sentiment grew. The Democratic Party of Iranian Kurdistan (KDP or KDP-I), which led the Kurdish nationalist movement at the time, did not engage in serious conflict or government opposition until the Iranian Revolution. Kurdish anti-government action resumed in 1979, with the KDP even laying out a plan for an independent Iranian Kurdistan. However, the Iranian government cracked down on the insurgency, with some reports saying that thousands of Kurds were arrested, imprisoned, or killed. In the 1980s, Iran legalized Kurdish-language publishing to quell domestic nationalist sentiment and, during the Iran–Iraq War, even provided monetary support to Iraqi Kurdish separatist groups in an effort to destabilize Iraq. In the 2000s, the Kurdistan Free Life Party (PJAK) formed and has been engaged in a conflict with the Iranian government. Iranian officials have claimed that the PJAK is an Israeli and U.S. proxy, and there are reports of both Israeli and U.S. involvement with the group, but this topic remains debated. The U.S. designated the PJAK as a terrorist organization in 2009.

Many current separatist movements advocate for the unification of Kurds in Turkey, Iraq and Syria to form Kurdistan or to create the Commonwealth of East Kurdistan. Some political parties that advocated for Kurdish independence from Iran include the Democratic Party of Iranian Kurdistan (PDKI), which is a member of the Unrepresented Nations and Peoples Organization. Militant organizations advocating for Kurdish independence include Kurdistan Free Life Party and the Komala Party of Iranian Kurdistan.

In 2004, the PDKI "endorsed a federal system for a multi-national, multi-ethnic, and multi-religious Iran".

== Iranian Azerbaijan ==
This movement advocates for the independence of Azerbaijani majority territories in Iran. Separatists propose either an independent South Azerbaijan or unification with Azerbaijan. Some political parties and militant organizations advocating for Azerbaijani separatism are the Southern Azerbaijan National Awakening Movement and the Azerbaijan National Resistance Organization.

== Sistan and Baluchestan ==
Separatists in Sistan and Baluchestan mainly advocate for the creation of an ethnically Baloch country called Balochistan, which would also include the Balochistan province of Pakistan and ethnically Baloch territories in Afghanistan. Militant organizations advocating for Baloch independence are Jaysh al-Adl and Jundallah. Because Balochistan spans both Iran and Pakistan, the insurgency complicates the cordial relationship between the two countries. Iran has accused Pakistan of not doing enough to prevent Baloch separatists from attacking Iran. In January 2024, tensions escalated when Iran and Pakistan exchanged cross-border missile strikes targeting both Baloch separatist groups, but soon after agreed to de-escalate tensions and enhance cooperation along their shared border.

== Turkmen Sahra ==
Turkmen Sahra has a history of political movements seeking greater autonomy and self-government. In 1924, a movement in the region led to the proclamation of the short-lived Turkmen Republic. Decades later, following the Iranian Revolution of 1979, a broad-based Turkmen Turkmen People's cultural and Political Society emerged in the region. For approximately a year, Turkmen Sahra experienced a period of dual authority, during which local political institutions exercised significant influence alongside the newly established central government. The movement was eventually suppressed by the Islamic Republic of Iran, and subsequent efforts by Turkmen political movements continued to focus on cultural rights, political representation, and regional self-government.

In Turkmen Sahra, some sources and Turkmen activists have criticized the continued settlement and organized migration of non-native populations into the region, describing it as part of a broader process of demographic change and the weakening of the Turkmen presence. These claims have been raised in connection with policies concerning population settlement, land allocation, and demographic changes in the region.

== See also ==
- Federalism in Iran
