= HNG =

HNG may refer to:

- Hengoed railway station, in Wales
- Former Houston Natural Gas, US
- Haji Namdar Group, a terrorist organisation in Pakistan
- Hungary, ITU letter code
