= 1979 Iranian ethnic unrest =

Tensions following the Iranian Revolution

- Part of the Aftermath of the Iranian Revolution and the Iran–Iraq War
Date	1979–1983
Location	Iran
Result	Suppression of all revolts

Belligerents
Interim Government Islamic Republic of Iran	Azerbaijani rebels Kurdish rebels Ahwazi rebels Turkmen rebels Qashqai rebels Supported by: Iraq

The 1979 Iranian ethnic unrest was a wave of ethnic tensions in Iran in the aftermath of the Iranian Revolution which varyingly resulted in protests and rebellions against the new Iranian government. Some of the rebellions were fully separatist while others were autonomist or just demanded increased rights. The unrest was eventually quelled.

== Conflicts ==
=== Kurdish revolt ===
The KDPI, led by Abdulrahman Qasimlo, quickly fell out with Khomeini in March 1979 after its failure to gain autonomy, and revolted. There were also conflicts between Shia and Sunni Kurds, as well as Kurds and Azeris. The Kurdish rebels, who were well armed, captured Sanandaj, Paveh, Saqqez, and Mahabad, and successfully resisted several Iranian attempts to recapture the cities.

By early September, Iran recaptured the cities, and the KDPI retreated to the mountains and continued waging attacks. In November, the KDPI attacked Mahabad and most major Kurdish cities, at the same time many Kurds began joining government forces. KDPI continued its attacks, and continued to fight consistently from January to August 1980. The KDPI was supported by the Iraqi government, which made several military incursions during the time which escalated to a full invasion of Iran on 22 September.

By December, Iraq and the KDPI launched major thrusts into western Iran. After the KDPI sided with the Iraqi invaders, many more Iranian Kurds stopped supporting it. Furthermore, Iran began supporting the Kurds in Iraq. With the support of Iranian Kurds, and Iraqi Kurds who cut off many Iraq-KDPI supply lines, Iran defeated KDPI. By 1983, the KDPI was limited to the mountains, capable of sporadic fighting at best. Kurdish tribesmen and armed civilians also resisted the Iraqi invasion.

By October 1983, in Val-Fajr 4, Iranian forces and Iraqi Kurdish fighters cleared out the remaining Iraqi soldiers in Iranian Kurdistan. They finally severed the connection between KDPI and the Iraqi army. Iran also captured parts of Iraqi Kurdistan with the help of the Iraqi Kurdish fighters, despite its concerns over their secular nationalist ambitions. Iran established a foothold in Iraqi Kurdistan, causing some Iraqi units to leave southern Iraq and head northwards, providing some relief to the Iranian troops in southern Iraq.

=== Ahwazi revolt ===
Khuzestani Arabs had long complained of economic and political marginalization by the Persian-dominated government, which did not improve after the 1979 Islamic revolution despite promises. In late April 1979, Sunni Arab militants in Khuzestan revolted against the Iranian government. The navy and air force were already in Khorramshahr quelling the violence. More Khuzestani Arabs began protests, after which the government sent IRGC units. After the revolt was suppressed, an Arab protest in Khorramshahr was violently suppressed on 29 May. After 100 had died in street fighting, Iran declared a state of emergency in Khuzestan on 31 May. During the Iran–Iraq War, Khuzestan was one of the main front lines, and the official Iraqi goal was to annex Khuzestan and incite Arab revolts, although they failed to achieve it. In 1980, the DRFLA attacked and sieged the Iranian Embassy in London.

=== Turkmen revolt ===
In the immediate aftermath of the Iranian Revolution, the Turkmen People's Cultural and Political Society was established, mobilizing Sunni Turkmen. On 26 March 1979, Turkmen leaders in Gonbad-e Kavus boycotted the constitutional referendum due to land grievances and fought against the IRGC until 3 April, when a ceasefire was signed, and autonomy was increased. The IRGC was supported by the air force, while the Turkmen fighters were joined by leftist guerrillas. In February 1980, the ceasefire broke as the Turkmen revolted again, although the IRGC suppressed it. The brief clashes resulted in over 100 dead on both sides.

== See also ==
- Separatism in Iran
