= Federalism in Iran =

Proposed system of governance in Iran

Map of Iran, showing its provinces. As of 2024, Iran is primarily a unitary state. In 2002, 800 municipal governments had budgets independent of the central government, while the 28 provincial governments' budgets depended directly on the central government.

Federalism in Iran has been debated by Iranians in the twenty-first century. In 2004, the Democratic Party of Iranian Kurdistan called for a federal system. In 2019, public debate followed former Iranian president Mohammad Khatami's suggestion that federalism would be the "most desirable democratic form of government of Iran" but was constitutionally impossible. Kurdish groups' opinions on the March 2023 Mahsa Charter varied between support and opposition, based on differing interpretations on whether the charter supported federalism.

== 1979 ==
In June 1979, at the initiative of the National Democratic Front of Iran, a conference was held with the participation of representatives of several political parties and organizations, including the Organization of Iranian People's Fedai Guerrillas (Kurdistan branch), Komala, the Democratic Party of Iranian Kurdistan, the Turkmen People's Cultural and Political Society, the Arab People's Cultural Association of Iran, the Democratic Organization of the Baloch People, and the Azerbaijan Issues Research Group. The participants formulated an 11-point proposal entitled the "Plan for the Autonomy of the Peoples of Iran", which called for the establishment of a federal and democratic system in Iran.

The organizations intended to establish a Council of the Peoples of Iran and planned to convene a Congress of the Peoples of Iran in Mahabad in late June 1979. The congress, however, was not held following the attack by forces of the Islamic Republic of Iran on Kurdistan. At the same time, the newly established government was also pursuing the suppression of the political and ethnic movement in Turkmen Sahra, where clashes between government forces and Turkmen organizations had already begun in the spring of 1979.

== 2004 ==
According to Razgar Alani of the Democratic Party of Iranian Kurdistan (PDKI), the PDKI had a "turning point" in 2004 when it "endorsed a federal system for a multi-national, multi-ethnic, and multi-religious Iran".

== 2019 ==
=== Khatami comment ===
On 11 May 2019, former Iranian president Mohammad Khatami stated at an Islamic City Council of Tehran meeting, stated that "the most desirable democratic form of government for Iran could be a federative government, although Iran cannot be a federal state according to its Constitution" and that "maybe politically this is not the opportune time" for federalism.

Khatami's suggested support for federalism provoked debate in Iran. A letter "No to federalism, not to national disintegration" was signed by 200 Iranians based in Iran and among the Iranian diaspora, arguing that there was no precedent for a stable unitary state to have been dis-aggregrated into a federation, apart from Iraq since 2005, that Iran "is an age-old country that has always remained integrated", and that federalisation would not solve socio-economic problems in Iran.

Political scientists Javad Tabatabai and Tirdad Bonakdar criticised Khatami's comment. Bonakdar nuanced his criticism by stating that he supported decentralisation. Mohammad Reza Javadi Hesar, a Reformist activist, supported Khatami's comment, interpreting in the sense of decentralisation of power to municipal-level governance. Abdulla Mohtadi, one of the founders of Komala Party of Iranian Kurdistan, stated that Khatami's comments included a realistic description of ethnic diversity in Iran, and that federalism is "a progressive idea which secures Iranian people's rights and brings them closer to each other".

IranWire published a series of detailed responses to Khatami's comment.

=== Pro-federalisation ===
Kamran Matin, an political scientist at Sussex University, argued that two billion people lived in federal systems in 2019, and that federalism could be "beneficial and effective" for Iran and other countries. He stated that a federal system in Iran would have to include guarantees of minority rights in all units of the federation, and that the specific system would have to be negotiated. Matin suggested the Democratic Autonomous Administration of North and East Syria as a good example "provid[ing] equal levels of political participation for all religious–cultural groups". He stated that existing national–ethnic organisations in Iran trying to defend minority rights were likely candidates for participating in negotiations. Matin argued that federalisation and radical democracy would be the best way to prevent the disintegration of Iran.

=== Anti-federalisation ===
Mohammad Mohebi, a social scientist at Islamic Azad University, argued that federalisation only refers to aggregrative federalisation and centralisation of power, and that dis-aggregative federalisation is necessarily secession. He said that "partition" of Iran along ethnic lines would be impractical and would lead to "bloody wars". Mohebi argued in favour of decentralisation, and possibly increasing the number of Iranian provinces.

Political scientist Jalil Roshandel at East Carolina University argued that federalisation was not possible in 2019 because "issues such as equal civil, political, and religious rights [had] been taboo for the past 40 years" in Iran, and that the Islamic Republic political system was totalitarian, with the Supreme Leader having an absolute power to override lower-level decisions. Roshandel agreed that federalism was generically "one of the best forms of government", but that in Iran, "cultural, political, social, and economic infrastructures" would have to be changed first. His view was that federalisation imposed by the central government would risk leading to a similar situation as in the breakup of Yugoslavia.

Lawyer Shahin Sadeghzadeh Milani, said that those who favoured federalisation wanted an ethnic and language based structure, which would be opposed to the principle of equal rights for all Iranian citizens, and would "trigger ethnic tensions". He also stated that federalisation would lead to the creation of more province-level legislatures, judiciaries, and executives, with different legislative systems for each province, which would create borders. He said that under future conditions, when "dividing a province [would not be] likely to lead to conflict and bloodshed", then decentralisation should be considered.

=== Cultural rights ===
When asked to write about federalism in response to Khatami's comment, Kurdish journalist Agiri Esmailnazhad commented on what he saw as discrimination in Iran against the use of the Kurdish language, and misleading criticism, in public debate, of defence of the Kurdish language as a security threat. He argued that the quality of public debate had to improve.

== 2023–present ==
=== Mahsa Charter ===
In February 2023, a diverse range of Iranian opponents to the Islamic Republic, calling themselves the Alliance for Democracy and Freedom in Iran (ADFI), including Reza Pahlavi, Masih Alinejad, Hamed Esmaeilion, Shirin Ebadi, Abdullah Mohtadi, Nazanin Boniadi, Golshifteh Farahani, and Ali Karimi, held a press conference at the Georgetown Institute for Women, Peace, and Security, declaring their unity and promising to publish a charter of demands. Among other demands, the charter, published as the "Mahsa Charter" in early March, called for "maintain[ing] the territorial integrity of Iran while accepting diversity in language, ethnicity, religion and culture" and "[d]ecentralization of power by deferring financial, bureaucratic and policy making affairs to elected provincial, city, and regional administrations".

Omar Ilkhanizadeh of Komala Party of Iranian Kurdistan said that Komala supported the Mahsa Charter because it supported the "fundamental principles of federalism, regardless of the use of the term itself". Ibrahim Alizadeh of Komalah (CPI) criticised the charter as not representing the people "driving the revolution in Iran" and not recognising the right of self-determination of oppressed groups as a legal international principle. Mohammed Nazif Qaderi of the Democratic Party of Iranian Kurdistan said that the party opposed the charter as too "relian[t] on a centrist and consensus-seeking approach". Siamand Moeini of Kurdistan Free Life Party criticised the charter as promoting "centrism" and not representing the participants of the Woman, Life, Freedom movement.

The ADFI lost support from Pahlavi and his supporters, and was declared closed by four members on 26 April 2023.

=== 2025 ===
In September 2025, following the Twelve-Day War, a GAMAAN opinion poll found that as alternatives to the post-1979 Islamic Republic of Iran system of governance, 12% favoured a non-federal republic versus 9% favouring a federal republic; 22% favoured a non-federal monarchy versus 7% favouring a federal monarchy; 20% favoured retaining the Islamic Republic; and the remainder expressed no preference.

=== 2026 ===
In January 2026, during the 2025–2026 Iranian protests and 2026 Iran massacres, Razgar Alani of the PDKI argued that during a century of development of Iran as a modern nation state, there had been a persistent distrust of Iran's "constituent nations" towards authoritarian, centralised governance. His view was that as of January 2026, there was wide support from "Iran's various nations, ethnic groups, and religious communities" both for decentralisation of power between a central, federal power and regional powers, as well as separation of powers between the legislative, executive and judicial branches of power. He viewed Iran as "consist[ing] of six nations (Turk, Kurd, Persian, Baloch, Arab, and Turkmen) and other ethnic and religious groups. He cited Belgium, Iraq, Canada, Switzerland, and India as examples of "national–geographical" federalism.

On 17 April 2026, during the 2026 Iran war, Abdullah Mohtadi of the KPIK argued that prior to the 1991 Gulf War, federalism in Iraq, with Kurdistan Region having the status of a federal state, had not been expected. He argued that Iran is an ideal country to be federalised, because it "consists of five or six nations", it "is the remnant of a great empire and, like all empires, it contains various nations, religions, and different cultures", and "a form of official recognition and inclusion of these different identities" would be needed for democracy.

== See also ==
- Congress of Nationalities for a Federal Iran
