= Qudsiyyih Khanum Ashraf =

Iranian religious educator (1889–1976)

- قدسیه خانم اشرف
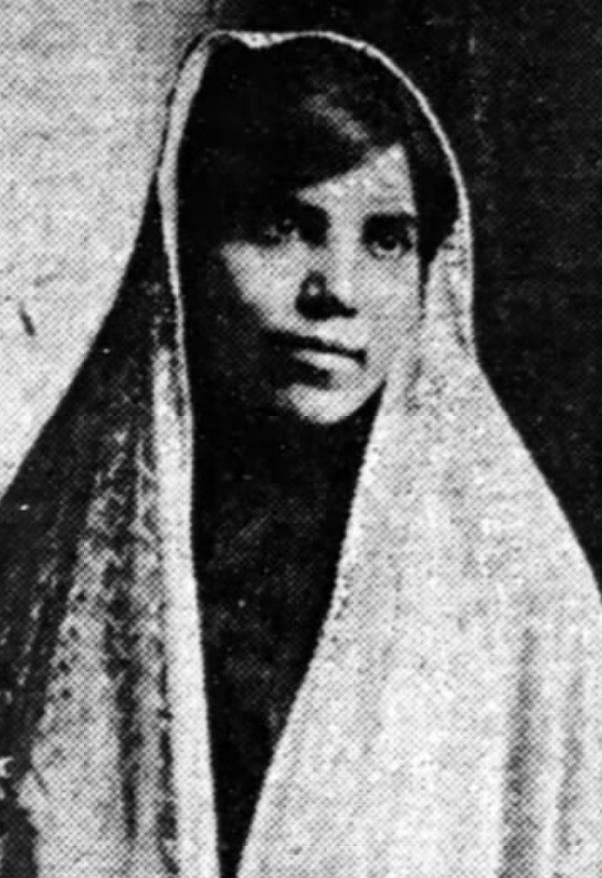
- Qudsiyyih Khanum Ashraf, from a 1911 newspaper.
- Born: 22 November 1889; Majidabad, Tehran, Sublime State of Iran
- Died: 16 April 1976 (aged 86); Tehran, Imperial State of Iran
- Other names: Ghodsia Ashraf Khanum, Qodṣiya Maryam Ašraf, Ghodsea Ashraf, Ghodsieh Khanum-i-Ashraf
- Occupation: Educator

Qudsiyyih Khanum Ashraf (Persian: قدسیه خانم اشرف; 22 November 1889 – 16 April 1976), also known as Qodṣiya Maryam Ašraf or Ghodsia Ashraf Khanum, was an Iranian religious educator; she is considered one of the first Iranian women to be educated in the United States.

== Early life ==
Qudsiyyih Ashraf was born in Majidabad, near Tehran, the daughter of Mirza Fazl'ullah Khan and Ṣafiya-Monavvar Khānom. Her father was a surveyor. She attended the American School for Girls in Tehran. In 1911, she traveled to the United States, in the care of an American Bahá'i, lawyer Louis G. Gregory, for the last leg of the journey (England to New York).

Ashraf attended the Lewis Institute in Chicago, the first woman from Iran to hold a scholarship from the American Bahá'i community, through the Persian-American Educational Society. She earned a bachelor's degree at Boston University in 1917, and also completed a first aid certificate from the American Red Cross in Boston that year. She earned a master's degree at Teachers College, Columbia University in 1918. She returned to Iran in 1919. She often gave lectures and interviews during her student years in the United States, always emphasizing her love of learning and her optimism about Persian women's futures: "It gives me joy to think of the freedom which is coming to the women of my country through the granting of a constitution," she informed a Pittsburgh reporter in 1911.

She pursued further studies at the American University of Beirut, where she trained as a nurse, and earned a midwifery certificate in 1931.

== Career ==
Ashraf addressed the first meeting of the Persian-American Educational Society in Washington, D.C. soon after her 1911. She also attended a reception at the White House in June 1911. She was present at the laying of the cornerstone at the Wilmette Bahá'i House of Worship in 1912, an event presided over by faith leader ‘Abdu’l-Bahá. In 1918, before she returned to Iran, she taught science at a public school and organized a Girl Scout troop in Flemington, New Jersey.

Ashraf was a teacher at the Tarbiyat Bahá’í School in Iran. She helped to organize the Women's Society for Progress in Tehran, with a focus on women's literacy. In 1930, she represented the women of Persia at the Congress of the Women of the East, held in Damascus. In 1932 she opened a private midwifery practice in Nablus, Palestine. She returned to Iran and worked for the Anglo-Persian Oil Company in the 1940s. She organized a school for young children in Abadan and literacy, health, and skill-building classes for women.

Ashraf received the King’s Medal for Service in the Cause of Freedom in 1948. From 1956 to 1963, she traveled and taught in South America, and visited a nephew based in Brazil. Later in life, she ran a school, library, and clinic for cotton workers and their families, in Turkmen Sahra.

== Personal life ==
Ashraf died in Tehran, in 1976, aged 86 years. Her grave is in the Bahá'i cemetery in Tehran. Some of her writings are in the Ashraf family archive in Geneva, Switzerland.
