= 1979 Turkmen rebellion in Iran =

Rebellion in Golestan province

- Part of the 1979 Iranian ethnic unrest
Date	March 1979 - early 1980
Location	Golestan, Iran
Result	Iranian victory: Uprising crushed; Further marginalisation of the Turkmen people
Territorial changes	The Iranian Armed Forces recapture all territory lost during the rebellion

Belligerents
Iran	Iranian Turkmen rebels

Commanders and leaders
(Iran) Ruhollah Khomeini (Iran) Mostafa Chamran	Shir Muhammad Derakhshandeh Toumaj; Centralized Council Leadership

Strength
unknown	unknown

Casualties and losses
- unknown

The 1979 Turkmen rebellion in Iran was a significant ethnic and political rebellion led by Iranian Turkmens in Golestan province in the immediate aftermath of the Iranian Revolution. Motivated by longstanding grievances as an ethnic and religious minority in Iran, the Turkmen rebels demanded autonomy, land reform, and recognition of their identity.

== History ==
Iranian Turkmens had long complained of marginalization by the state. During the Pahlavi era, Turkmens suffered systematic land confiscation under Reza Shah’s land reforms. These lands were often transferred to Persian Shi‘an elites and absentee landlords. Turkmens were also underrepresented in government, excluded from cultural expression, and subject to forced assimilation policies.

Immediately after the 1979 revolution, the Turkmen People's Cultural and Political Society, a Marxist group, emerged as the leading political body among Iranian Turkmens. Formed in Gonbad-e Qabus, the group advocated for decentralization, the autonomy for Turkmensahra, and the official recognition of the Sunni faith and cultural rights of Turkmens, and maintained armed self-defense units and created People’s Councils to organize village and regional administration.

Initially, some Turkmens hoped that the revolution might provide them with democratic reforms and local autonomy. However, a few months after the revolution, it became increasingly clear that the Islamic Republic was rejecting pluralism. The Council of the Islamic Revolution and Khomeini himself opposed federalism or ethnic autonomy, denouncing it as a threat to national unity. In March 1979, tensions erupted into open conflict when the IRGC were deployed to Gonbad-e Qabus after clashes between Turkmen militias and local Persian landlords supported by the new government. The clashes immediately sparked when the Turkmen militants occupied land owned by Persian elites and refused to vacate it, demanding it be returned to the Turkmens.

Fighting worsened in Gonbad-e Qabus, where Turkmen militias seized government buildings. The IRGC responded with a siege of the city. Despite initial resistance, Turkmen forces were poorly equipped and lacked outside support. Iranian state forces regained control after heavy fighting, arrests, and extrajudicial executions. A second wave of resistance in May and August 1979 saw renewed fighting in villages such as Khalilabad, Aq Qala, and Bandar-e Torkaman. Iranian security forces reportedly used heavy artillery, mass arrests, and torture. Several Turkmen leaders, including Abdollah Shoureshi, were detained, and others disappeared.

By early 1980, the revolt was suppressed as the IRGC occupied of Turkmen towns, caused significant damage to Turkmen militias, and purged political opponents. Many Turkmen militants were imprisoned or forced into exile. The uprising left a profound sense of alienation among many Iranian Turkmens. It became a symbol of broken revolutionary promises, and many Turkmens withdrew from political engagement in the Islamic Republic. Unlike the Kurdish or Baluchi movements, the Turkmen rebellion was short-lived but symbolically potent.

== See also ==
- 1979 Kurdish rebellion in Iran
- 1979 Khuzestan insurgency
