= Iran–Sudan relations =

- Sudan: Iran

Diplomatic mission
- Sudanese embassy, Tehran: Iranian embassy, Khartoum

Sudan and Iran maintain diplomatic, economic and military relations. Sudan maintained good relations with Iran both under the shah and for decades under the Islamic Republic.

Sudan and Iran severed diplomatic ties in the 2010s due to their opposing sides in the Iran–Saudi Arabia proxy conflict, but restored them as Iran supported Sudanese armed forces in the civil war. In July 2024, Tehran and Khartoum have reestablished diplomatic ties after seven years. Sudan received Iran's new ambassador and designated its own envoy to Tehran. This renewal initiates a new chapter in their relations, highlighted by Sudan's recent visit to Iran to acquire drones.

== History ==
Sudan maintained good relations with the Pahlavi Iran, securing a number of loans during the period prior to the Iranian revolution. Following the revolution, Sudan, led by pro-West Gaafar Nimeiry, supported Iraq in its war with Iran, in line with Arab League policy. Sudan's Prime Minister Sadiq al Mahdi made an official visit to Tehran in the late 1980s thus establishing ties with the Islamic Republic. Following the Islamist-supported military coup led by Omar al-Bashir, Sudan sought close relations with Iran. The growing ties help continue the Islamisation of Sudan. In the post-Cold War era, Sudan remains Iran's closest ally in Africa. Sudan was for years the only African state ruled by Islamists. The two states, despite the "Sunni-Shiite divide" quickly became close allies. Sudan had a long, if inconsistent, relationship with Iran, which deteriorated when Sudan supported Iraq during the 1990–91 Gulf War but began to improve by the mid-1990s. In 1991, Iranian President Ali Akbar Hashemi Rafsanjani made an official visit to Khartoum, accompanied by more than 150 Iranian officials." He declared the "Islamic Revolution of Sudan, alongside Iran's pioneer revolution, can doubtless be the source of movement and revolution throughout the Islamic world." Sudanese–Iranian interaction increased significantly in 2004. The two countries signed a memorandum on security cooperation, and Sudan stressed Iran's right to use nuclear energy for peaceful purposes. During the eighth session of the Iran–Sudan joint economic commission, the two sides agreed to increase technical, educational, and research cooperation in the agricultural sector. Iranian president Muhammad Khatami, during a visit to Sudan in October 2004, supported Khartoum's controversial handling of the Darfur crisis and signed bilateral cooperation agreements on economic, agricultural, and banking issues. As Iran became an increasingly important actor in the Middle East, Sudan increased its interaction with Tehran. Al-Bashir visited Iran in April 2006. Sudan's defense minister discussed Iranian weapons sales and training for Khartoum's security forces during a visit to Tehran in January 2007. Iranian president Mahmoud Ahmadinejad visited Khartoum in February 2007, when he voiced strong support for Sudan and signed seven agreements. There continued to be high-level contact between Sudan and Iran. Sunni Sudan did not find forging close relations with Shia Iran an insuperable difficulty, and as of 2011 Sudan was arguably Iran's closest friend in Africa.

However, Sudan decided to expel all Iranian groups just hours before joining a Saudi military operation in Yemen in March 2015 as the Sudanese President Omar al-Bashir at the time was said to be calculating in favour of his fragile economy, in addition to the trauma and horror which struck the Sudanese society when seeing its best and brightest joining the Islamic State (ISIS), generating a huge public alarm about regional security. The emotional component of protecting Saudi Arabia and walking back to the (Arab house) unfolded dramatically in Arab media. On January 4, 2016, Sudan cut off all diplomatic relations with Iran due to tensions between Saudi Arabia and Iran. As a result, the bond between both countries has severely soured. Once allies, both countries were once listed by the United States as "State Sponsors of Terrorism", although Sudan was removed from the list in December 2020 following its accession to the Abraham Accords. According to the U.S. Department of State, Iran remains a state sponsor of terror.

== Contemporary era ==
=== Cultural and diplomatic ties under Omar al-Bashir ===
During the last week of April 2006, Sudanese President Omar al-Bashir met with a number of Iranian public figures in Tehran, including the Supreme Leader Ali Khamenei and President Mahmoud Ahmadinejad. In a joint news conference with al-Bashir on 24 April, Ahmadinejad explained to the public his belief that "expansion of ties between the two countries serves the interests of both nations, the region, and the Islamic world, particularly in terms of boosting peace and stability." Before the conference ended, al-Bashir congratulated Iran for its successful pursuit of "nuclear power for peaceful purposes," while Ahmadinejad restated his opposition to the participation of UN Peacekeepers in Darfur.

President Omar-al Bashir visited Iran in July 2011 and President of Iran Mahmoud Ahmadinejad visited Khartoum in September 2011 to discuss "strategic regional and international dimensions."

In October 2011, Ahmadinejad stated that Iran–Sudan relations are founded on "Common Islamic values." Bashir later stated Sudan would adopt an exclusive Islamic constitution and strengthen Islamic law in the government.

Two Iranian warships docked in Port Sudan on 8 December 2012, marking the second port call by the Iranian navy in Sudan in five weeks. The Iranian navy announced that the 1,400-ton frigate Jamaran and the 4,700-ton support ship Bushehr “docked in Port Sudan, after successfully carrying out their assignments in the Red Sea and were greeted by high-ranking Sudanese naval commanders.”

Sudanese army spokesman Sawarmi Khaled Saad had initially announced the warship visit for Nov. 30, stating that the port call was “a part of diplomatic and military exchanges between the two countries,” and would last for three days.

Previously, a pair of Iranian navy vessels, the supply ship Kharg and corvette Admiral Naghdi, spent about two days at Port Sudan in late October 2012.

=== Deterioration of relations since 2015 ===
However, since 2014, as for the result of growing tensions between Iran and Saudi Arabia, the feeling of return to the Arab house, and growing Iranian influence in the country threatens its Sunni domination, Sudan decided to close all Iranian cultural centers and expelled the Iranian officials and ambassador from the country. It was later followed by Sudan's participation in the Yemeni war against Houthis and received aids from Qatar and Saudi Arabia, in exchange for lifting sanctions on Sudan by the United States.

In 2016, following the attack on Saudi embassy by Iranian protesters, Sudan cut off relations with Iran, souring relations between two countries.

In 2020, Sudan began the process of normalisation with Israel. This was criticized by Iran, where the Iranian government accused Sudan of "paying ransom".

=== During the Sudanese Civil War ===
Since July 2023, Sudan's foreign ministry has discussed restoring relations "as soon as possible." This move came after the Iranian Red Crescent had supplied humanitarian aid during the conflict in Sudan. In October, Iran and Sudan agreed to restore diplomatic relations and open embassies after a meeting between their foreign ministers.

In July 2024, de facto ruler of Sudan Abdel Fattah al-Burhan received an Iranian ambassador in Port Sudan, the de facto capital of Sudan at the time due to fighting in the capital city Khartoum, in the Sudanese civil war. In return, the Iranian foreign ministry received a Sudanese ambassador in the capital city of Tehran. This was the first time the two countries exchanged ambassadors in eight years.

During the ongoing Sudanese Civil War, Iran has emphasized its support for Sudan's territorial integrity and the country's internationally recognized government. In October 2025, Iranian Deputy Foreign Minister Abbas Araghchi held a phone call with the Sudanese Foreign Minister, during which he condemned attacks on civilians in Al-Fashir and called for the preservation of Sudan's unity. The Sudanese official briefed Araghchi on developments in the conflict and expressed appreciation for Iran's political support and solidarity with the Sudanese people.

In April 2026, during the 2026 Iran war, some pro-SAF Islamist factions publicly expressed support for Iran. According to reports, Iran had supplied drones to the SAF during the civil war, which were seen as helping shift the balance of power against the Rapid Support Forces (RSF). The U.S. State Department sanctioned the Sudanese Muslim Brotherhood, closely aligned with the SAF, in part due to the fact that its fighters are "receiving training and other support from Iran's Islamic Revolutionary Guard Corps (IRGC)." Observers noted that Sudan's leadership faced pressure from regional allies such as Saudi Arabia and Egypt, as well as the United States, to limit ties with both Iran and Islamist groups within the SAF coalition. Nonetheless, SAF officers expressed their support for Iran on social media videos that went viral.

== Economic relations ==
In 1991, evidence of increasing economic and military links between Sudan and Iran was revealed. High-level Iranian leaders have made numerous visits to Sudan, during which a trade agreement between the two countries had been established. Iran reportedly supplied Sudan with one million tons of oil each year.

== Ideological and educational outreach ==
Beyond military cooperation, Iran is employing soft power strategies to deepen its influence in Sudan. This includes establishing educational institutions aimed at promoting Shiite ideology and strengthening ties with local communities. Such initiatives are part of Iran's broader effort to expand its ideological reach in Africa.

== Military relations ==
In November 1993, Iran was reported to have financed Sudan's purchase of some 20 Chinese ground-attack aircraft. Iran pledged 17 million in financial aid to the Sudanese government, and arranged for $300 million in Chinese arms to be delivered to the Sudanese army.

It was reported that Iran sent up to 2,000 Iranian Revolutionary Guards to Sudan. Iranian Defense Minister Ali Akbar Torkan met with the commander of the Sudanese Armed Forces to negotiate further military assistance. Sudan has since modeled its army after Iran's Revolutionary Guards, who had trained them.

In 1995, a military delegation from Iran visited Khartoum to assess Sudan's military needs. Iran provided Sudan with armored cars, heavy artillery, and radar equipment. In the following year, the two countries signed an agreement to broaden the scope of their cooperation.

In April 1996 the Government was reported to be granting the Iranian navy the use of marine facilities in exchange for financial assistance for the purchase of arms although, in response to a Sudanese request for military aid in 1997, Iran provided assistance only with military maintenance. The West has expressed deep concern over the growing military ties between Sudan and Iran. Sudan has been implicated in training at least 10 paramilitary camps in collaboration with the Iranian military and Iran-backed terrorist groups. By 1993, the U.S. Department of State named Sudan a state sponsor of terrorism.

In 2008, Sudan and Iran signed a military cooperation agreement. The agreement was signed by Iran's Defense Minister Mostafa Mohammad-Najjar and his Sudanese counterpart Abdelrahim Mohamed Hussein.

During the 2011 Libyan civil war, Western intelligence agencies reported Iran's Quds Force stole dozens of Russian-made surface-to-air missiles from Libya and smuggled them across the border into Sudan. According to the reports, the weapons included SA-24 missiles, which were sold to Libya in 2004. Intelligence officials also believe that other weapons were seized from Gaddafi and are now held at a secret facility run by Iran's Revolutionary Guards in Northern Darfur.

In a leaked document from summer 2014, the ties between Iran and Sudan are described as being “strategic”, “military” and “defensive”. General Siddiq Amer, Director General of Intelligence and Security, - “Iran is our biggest ally in the region, in terms of cooperation in the areas of intelligence and military industrial production.” General Abd al-Rahim Mohammed Husein, Minister of Defence, said: “ All the advancement in our military industry is from Iran. They opened the doors of their stores of weapons for us, at a time the Arabs stood against us. The Iranian support came when we were fighting a rebellion that spread in all directions including the National Democratic Alliance (NDA). The Iranians provided us with experts and they trained our M.I. [Military Intelligence] and security cadres. They also trained us in weapons production and transferred to us modern technology in the military production industry. There is one full battalion of the Republican Guards still with us here and other experts who are constructing interception and spying bases in order to protect us, plus an advanced Air Defense system. They built for us Kenana and Jebel Awliya Air bases.” The Kenana Air base is likely situated south of the city of Rabak (White Nile State), near the Kenana Sugar Company facilities. The minutes reveal that Sudan has also provided weapons to the Houthis (a Shia insurgent group) operating in Yemen.

General Husein revealed that the Kenana Air Base has been used for the transit of Iranian weapons. BM missile launchers and their rockets stored in Kenana and part sold to Qatar to support Libya fighters. Husein's words thus confirmed Libya's recent denunciation of Khartoum's logistical support to the Libya Dawn Militias.

Since reestablishing diplomatic ties with Sudan in October 2023 after a seven-year hiatus, Iran has supplied the SAF with advanced weaponry, notably Mohajer-6 and Ababil drones. These drones have been instrumental in recent SAF offensives, including the recapture of key areas in Khartoum and Omdurman. Iran has also provided intelligence support and facilitated the training of new SAF recruits, some reportedly trained in Uganda.

In 2026, the United States authorities arrested a woman, Shahim Mafi, in Los Angeles. Federal prosecutors charged her with trafficking weapons to the SAF, including the sale of: “drones, bombs, bomb fuses, and millions of rounds of ammunition.”

== See also ==
- Foreign relations of Iran
- Foreign relations of Sudan
