= 2026 Damietta drone strike =

Strike on ships in Egypt

- Part of the 2026 Iran war
- Location: 31°25′0″N 31°49′17″E; Damietta, Egypt
- Date: 29 July 2026
- Attack type: Drone strike
- Deaths: 0
- Injuries: 0
- Perpetrators: No party claimed responsibility Per United States: Iran

On 29 July 2026, a drone strike caused an explosion at the port in Damietta, Egypt, setting fire to two ships, including a United States gas-storage tanker. Egyptian authorities confirmed that a drone strike caused the fire. No party has claimed responsibility for the drone strike.

== Background ==
The drone strike took place amid the 2026 Iran war, which escalated further due to the renewed July 2026 United States strikes against Iran following the failure of the Islamabad Memorandum to cease hostilities. The drone strike took place hours after joint U.S.–Saudi strikes on Iraq killed at least 20 fighters of the Popular Mobilization Forces (PMF) and 4 soldiers of the Islamic Revolutionary Guard Corps (IRGC) of Iran.

Two days prior to the drone strike, following the Ukrainian attack on an Iranian commercial vessel, Iranian state-run TV identified Damietta as a possible target, describing it as "a gateway for gas exports to Europe" and a target for "retaliation against Ukrainian interests."

== Attack ==
On 29 July, a drone strike caused explosions at two ships, including a U.S.-owned and operated Marshall Islands-flagged liquefied natural gas storage tanker. According to Kpler, both vessels had been moved away from the Mediterranean port of Damietta, which is situated near the Suez Canal. No fatalities or injuries have been reported. Egypt's petroleum ministry said that a fire broke out on a gasification vessel and a storage vessel and was dealt with by firefighting and security teams. Egyptian authorities initially denied that a drone strike took place, claiming that the fire was caused by an engine room blaze on a vessel.

On 30 July, the cabinet of Egypt confirmed that the fire was caused by a drone strike the previous day after announcing an investigation into the attack. It added that no party has claimed responsibility. Two Iranian officials, speaking to The New York Times, said the drone strike was "designed to show that global shipping and energy supplies could be more deeply disrupted if Iran chose to escalate."

== Reactions ==
- Egypt: Egyptian President Abdel Fattah el-Sisi warned of serious escalation of the Iran war and "stressed the need for Egypt, Spain, Europe, and the international community to work together to halt this escalation."
- Iran: Iranian Foreign Ministry source denied to the Lebanese newspaper An-Nahar that Tehran had targeted the floating storage and regasification unit at Damietta Port, "Iran did not carry out this operation at all, nor does it have any intention of undertaking such an action," the source said.
- Kuwait: Kuwait strongly condemned the drone attack and affirmed that it stands in full solidarity with Egypt.
- Saudi Arabia: The Saudi foreign ministry condemned the drone attack and expressed its full solidarity with Egypt.
- Sudan: The Sudanese foreign ministry condemned the drone attack and described it as "a reprehensible act of aggression, a violation of international law, and a serious threat to the security, safety, and stability of the region."
- United Arab Emirates: The UAE strongly condemned the drone attack as a serious threat to the safety of international navigation and marks a dangerous escalation.
- United States: U.S. President Donald Trump implied that Iran or its proxies were responsible for the drone strike, calling it "a little more of the same. But it's going to be straightening out." That night, the U.S. carried out airstrikes on Iran in response to Iranian attacks on U.S. military facilities in Jordan.
- Houthis: The Houthi movement in Yemen denied targeting any vessel at Damietta Port.
- Arab League: Arab League Secretary-General Nabil Fahmy condemned the drone attack as an unacceptable act of aggression against Egypt and warned against further "desperate attempts to escalate the regional conflict." He also warned against "ill-advised adventures" by certain parties, stressing that attacks on Arab countries were "unacceptable across the board."
- Gulf Cooperation Council: GCC Secretary-General Jasem Mohamed Albudaiwi strongly condemned the drone attack on Damietta and similar terrorist attacks that seek to destabilize security and stability in the region.
