= 1979 Khuzestan insurgency =

Arab nationalist uprising in southwest Iran after the revolution

1979 Khuzestan uprising
- Part of the 1979 Iranian ethnic unrest and Arab separatism in Khuzestan
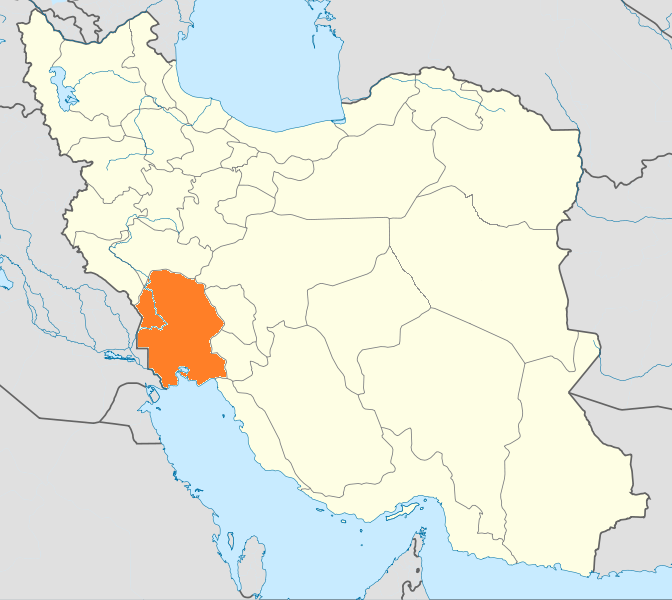
- Khūzestān Province of Iran, native name, استان خوزستان
Date	April – December 1979 (8 months)
Location	Khuzestan province, Iran
Result	Iranian victory: Uprising quelled; DRFLA siege of Iranian embassy in 1980

Belligerents
Interim Government; Islamic Republic of Iran (From 6 November)	DRFLA; APCO; PFLA; AFLA; Supported by: Iraq

Commanders and leaders
Mehdi Bazargan; Taghi Riahi; Ahmad Madani; Mostafa Chamran	Oan Ali Mohammed

Units involved
Islamic Republic of Iran Army; Revolutionary Guards	

Strength
	A few hundred (AFLA)

Casualties and losses
12+ Revolutionary Guardsmen killed	100 Iranian Arabs killed
- Total: 25–112 killed

The 1979 Khuzestan uprising was one of the nationwide uprisings in Iran which erupted in the aftermath of the Iranian Revolution. The unrest was fed by Arab demands for autonomy. The uprising was effectively quelled by Iranian security forces, resulting in more than a hundred people on both sides killed.

== Background ==
The Arabs of Iran are largely concentrated in the province of Khuzestan and number between half a million and 2 million. In Khuzestan, Arabs have historically formed the dominant ethnic group in Shadegan, Hoveyzeh and Susangerd, and a majority in Mahshahr, Khorramshahr, Abadan and Ahvaz.

The relationship between Iran's majority Persians and ethnic minorities changed when the Islamic Republic was formed in 1979. In part, this was a result of the Persian community's identification with the Islamic Republic, although some Arabs do identify with the Islamic republic as well.

In 1978, Khuzestani Arab oil workers went on strike, cutting the supply of oil to Tehran. This led to a reduction in income which contributed to the Shah's downfall and the Iranian Revolution. Iranian clerics then encouraged hostility between Persians and Arabs.

== Events ==
Following the aftermath of the Iranian revolution, Marxist guerrillas and federalist parties revolted in the regions of Khuzestan, Kurdistan and Gonbad-e Qabus, which resulted in fighting between various rebel groups and the forces loyal to the nascent revolutionary government. The largest rebellion by the Kurds unfolded in the West (Iranian Kurdistan), though the Revolutionary Guard (IRGC) was also confronted by Arabs, Turkomans and Baluchs. These revolts began in April 1979 and lasted between several months and over a year, depending on the region. In the early days of the communal conflict, the regime relied on volunteers from the Persian and Azeri communities to confront Kurdish, Baluchi and Turkoman rebellions.

Khuzestani Arabs suffered economic and political marginalization by the Persian-dominated government. The uprising began when armed Sunni Arabs rebelled in late April and into May 1979. Other Arabs in Khuzestan began protests against discrimination, which prompted the regime to send IRGC units to assist the already deployed navy and air force personnel (in Khorramshahr) in quelling the violence. Since rebellion broke out in Abadan, the Sepah was active in the arrests of Arabs and the confiscation of weapons. On May 29, an Arab protest in Khorramshahr was violently suppressed by the Revolutionary Guards. After 100 died in street fighting, Iran declared a state of emergency in Khuzestan on May 31.

According to an EIR News Service issue from December 1979, while "half of Iran" was in rebellion, the situation in Khuzestan province had already calmed down, even though Arab and Bakhtiari tribes were reportedly at odds with Khomeini's regime. Although some Khuzestani Arabs initially aligned with the new revolutionary government in Tehran, they soon realized that the Islamic Republic under Ruhollah Khomenei intended to enforce the same policies of economic, political, and social marginalization as the previous regime of the Shah.

== Casualties ==
More than a dozen Revolutionary Guardsmen and 100 Arabs died in the uprising.

== Aftermath ==
One of the consequences of the Arab uprising in Khuzestan was the Iranian Embassy siege, which took place from 30 April to 5 May 1980, after a group of six armed men stormed the Iranian embassy in South Kensington, London. The gunmen took 26 people hostage—mostly embassy staff, but several visitors and a police officer, who had been guarding the embassy, were also held. The hostage-takers were members of the DRFLA, an Iranian Arab militant group campaigning for the autonomy of Iran's Khuzestan province and they demanded the release of Arab prisoners from jails in Khūzestān and their own safe passage out of the United Kingdom. The British government quickly resolved that safe passage would not be granted, and a siege ensued. During the 17-minute raid, the SAS rescued all but one of the remaining hostages and killed five of the six terrorists. The soldiers subsequently faced accusations that they unnecessarily killed two of the terrorists, but an inquest into the deaths eventually cleared the SAS of any wrongdoing. The remaining terrorist was prosecuted and served 27 years in British prisons.

Later in 1980, The Khuzestan province has become a central scene of the Iran–Iraq War, which prompted the dimming of internal conflict, despite the Iraqi hopes of inciting a wide-scale rebellion by Arabs of Khuzestan, which eventually turned vague.

The tensions between the Iranian government and the Arab population of Khuzestan has sporadically exploded into violence over the next decades. In 2005, violent riots broke out in Khuzestan province, concentrating in the Ahvaz area. As a result, several people died and wide-scale arrests were performed by Iranian authorities. Following the events, a series of bombings were carried out in Khuzestan and in cities across Iran, claiming 28 casualties. The responsibility for the bombings was claimed by Ahvaz Arab separatists.

== See also ==
- 1979 Kurdish rebellion in Iran
- 1979 Turkmen rebellion in Iran
