= Azerbaijan National Resistance Organization =

- Spokesperson: Babek Chalabiyanli
- Founded: 19 March 2006
- Headquarters: Baku
- Ideology: Azerbaijani nationalism Pan-Turkism; Separatism

Website
- http://www.diranish.org/

Azerbaijan National Resistance Organization (ANRO) (AMDT) (Persian: تشکیلات مقاومت ملی آذربایجان) (Azerbaijani: Azərbaycan Milli Dirəniş Təşkilatı) was officially founded in 2006. The group defines itself as a part and subset of general National Movement of South Azerbaijan and advocates separatism for the Iranian Azerbaijanis as a result of their Pan-Turkist ideology.

== Advocacy ==
ANRO seeks to regain withheld economical, political, social, cultural and human rights and fundamental liberties of Azeri people in Iranian Azerbaijan.

ANRO aims to act within the democratic and civil struggle methods and values. The group avoids and condemns all kinds of violence, especially those from governments and organized armed terrorists.

In the ANRO's opinion, the struggle for self-determination is a legitimate and necessary right of the Turkic people in Iranian Azerbaijan.

The ANRO's news outlet is ArazNews, and Babek Chalabiyanli is the group's official spokesman.

The ceremony for the tenth anniversary of the Azerbaijan National Resistance Organization was held with the presence of ANRO authorities, members, supporters and guests from other organizations in South Azerbaijan on 22 March 2016.

== See also ==
- Azerbaijan People's Government
- Azerbaijan
- Azerbaijani language
- Azerbaijani people
