= Turkmen People's Cultural and Political Society =

Communist insurgent group in Iran

- Other name: Turkmensahra Councils Central Headquarters
- Dates active: 1979–1980 in Turkmen Sahra; 1980–present in Turkmenistan and Europe
- Country: Iran
- Headquarters: Gonbad-e Kavus, Golestan Province, Iran
- Newspaper: Ilguji
- Active regions: Turkmen Sahra
- Ideology: Agrarian socialism Federalism
- Political position: Left
- Wars: 1979 Turkmen rebellion in Iran
- Website: ilguji.org

The Turkmen People's Cultural and Political Society (Turkmen: Türkmen Halk Medenli we Syýasy Ojak, Persian: کانون فرهنگی و سیاسی خلق ترکمن), also known as the Turkmensahra Councils Central Headquarters (Persian: ستاد مرکزی شوراهای ترکمن‌صحرا), was a socialist and ethnic insurgent group based in Gonbad-e Kavus, Iran.

It was established in the immediate aftermath of the Iranian Revolution and mobilized Iranian Turkmens who mostly follow Sunni Islam. It was closely associated with the Organization of Iranian People's Fedai Guerrillas (OIPFG) in terms of political bent. Following Iranian Revolution, the Turkmen people established local councils and a parallel system of self-government across Turkmen Sahra. For roughly a year, a form of dual power existed in the region: the newly established Islamic Republic claimed formal sovereignty, while Turkmen councils exercised substantial authority over local administration, land distribution, and economic affairs. The After the initial clashes in March 1979, a ceasefire was reached, but the Turkmen councils continued to operate and expand their influence throughout the following months. It was only after this period of dual power that the Islamic Republic launched its decisive military offensive in February 1980, ultimately dismantling the councils and imposing central government control over Turkmen Sahra. The second phase erupted in February 1980 between the two sides, but it was suppressed by the Islamic Revolutionary Guard Corps. The kidnapping and murder of the group's leaders dealt a major blow to the organization, preventing it from continuing its activities inside Iran. Outside the country, Turkmen political activities have largely continued through organizations such as the Organization for the Defense of the National Rights of the Turkmen People and the Turkmen Sahra Cooperation Council.
