= Haji Namdar Group =

Haji Namdar Group (HNG), also known as Suppression of Vice and Promotion of Virtue and Local Taliban Movement, was an organisation designated as terrorist in Pakistan.

In 1991, Haji Namdar left Tirah and moved to Saudi Arabia. Upon his return in 2003, he founded the Haji Namdar Group, enforcing Taliban-interpreted Islamic law in the region. The Pakistani government designated HNG as a terrorist organisation on 30 June 2008. Haji Namdar was assassinated on 13 August 2008, allegedly by militants loyal to Baitullah Mehsud.
