= Turkmen Sahra =

Region in Northeast Iran

Coordinates: 37°13′N 55°0′E

Turkmen Sahra ترکمن صحرا
- Region
- Interactive map of Turkmen Sahra
- Capital: Gonbad-e kavus

Turkmen Sahra (Persian: ترکمن صحرا) is a region of Northeastern Iran near the Caspian Sea, bordering Turkmenistan, the majority of whose inhabitants are ethnic Turkmen. The most important cities of Turkmen Sahra are Gonbad-e Kavus, Aqqala, Kalaleh, Maraveh Tappeh, Gomishan and Bandar Torkaman. There are, according to Ethnologue, roughly 719,000 Turkmens in Turkmen Sahra today.

== Society ==
Turkmens today in Turkmen Sahra live fairly modern lifestyles, although the effects of religion and the Muslim way of life are visible. The economy is based on industry, even if agriculture still plays a great role in some Turkmens' life, like in other places of Iran. The professions among Turkmens show the pattern of a modern economy even if there are still some shortcomings due to lack of funding from the central authorities. The economic potential of Turkmen Sahra is large since a vast amount of oil was discovered early in the 1930s. But since there was a deal with the Soviet Union that there would be no oil extraction from Turkmen Sahra, there is not an oil industry at the moment.

Before the revolution of 1979, Turkmens had a richer life economically than the people of other regions of Iran. Although there was poverty in small parts, most people lived a prosperous life and could afford to provide material goods at home. This was unusual for some regions of Iran at that time. Before the revolution, due to the lack of facilities and infrastructure, there was a big difference between villages and cities, so that when they went from a city like Bandar Turkmen to a neighboring village, the differences were so great that the tourists felt that they had traveled back in time. There were few welfare services in the villages and people used horses and donkeys to travel. Buses, taxis, and private cars were only found in larger cities. These differences contributed to illiteracy among the village dwellers. This is despite the fact that after the revolution and the development of the country's infrastructure, the level of literacy in this region has increased significantly, but unfortunately, the level of welfare and livelihood of the people has decreased to the same extent and maybe more.

Other cultural traits can be seen as in the weddings where Turkmens still practice several day weddings. An ancient tradition hailing back to the Göktürks or even the Hsiung-nu, Asian Huns. Today's Turkmens have a bride fee: the bridegroom gives away a fee for taking the girl's hand. In tradition the girl's family provides even greater economic starting capital to the newlyweds' life. For example the bridegroom buys gold for the bride to wear; in return the bride's family buys daily life equipment for the new household.

The wedding itself, in times before the revolution, lasted several days where often all the relatives, clan members, and in some cases the whole village would turn up to celebrate. Common activities were to have races where the winner would receive a prize, contests in göresh traditional Turkmen wrestling, horse races and more. Today those traditions have perished instead there are a modern segment like private weddings hold in western countries.

== Economy ==
The main industries of Turkmen Sahra today is provisions or grocers of different kind, a refining process of different sort of eatables such as different kind of mills, beverages as pepsi, zam zam and others. There were different kind of small scale industries such as train suppliers and builders but almost all have been dismantled and set up other places of Iran. As a result many people, ethnic Turkmens have lost their jobs and have a hard time recovering. Another important and famous but who doesn't generate great income is the Russian caviar industries. Half of Iran's Russian caviar is caught and refined in Bandar Torkaman. Future possibilities are vast since oil has been discovered in Turkmen Sahra north parts near the border to Turkmenistan in the 1930s but due to deal with the Soviet Union no oil industry exists at the moment.

== History ==
Turkmens came first to the region at the time of their forefathers, the Seljuk Turks, thought early nomads empires has existed since the early age of Massagets or even earlier. According to the Avesta Afrasiyab the legendary king of Turan hailed from Turkmen Sahra.

Before the era of Reza Khan, later Reza Shah, there was a landmass from Khiva in north to Bandar gaz in south were Turkmens inhabited the area was called Turkmenistan. Due to the Great Game and famous resistance of Turkmens to great powers as czar Russia and England Turkmens lost their independence and their country was split in two lands. After the Battle of Geok Tepe over one million Turkmens fled through Iran over to Afghanistan were their descents still live today. The first time in history Turkmens had shown resistance to central authority of Iran was in early 1920 when Reza Khan unified Iran he meet resistance of a Turkmen group and a leader called Anna-Geldi Ach, the later used to deploy sneak attacks from Turkmen Sahra and use hit and run tactics and hide into modern Turkmenistan before SSR Turkmen was formed. During that time a gurultai like the ones Gökturks held was held to elect a mullah as their leader, called Osman Akhun. It is the first democratically modern Turkmen assemblement ever hold. Turkmens are considered by outsiders who visited their area to be generous, kind-hearted thought even having the trait of being hot-headed. Ahmad Shamlou, a famous Persian writer, wrote a novel about a Turkmen character, Amin. He also indicated the generosity and kind-hearted spirit of the Turkmens in his poem about Amin.

Famous Turkmens from within Turkmen Sahra include the spiritual leader, national poet and unifier of Turkmen society Magtymguly Pyragy, who was born in a village outside Gonbad. The central Iranian authorities erected a mausoleum over his grave. Other persons born are Agha Mohammed Khan, founder of the Qajar dynasty of Iran. Also there are claims of Nadir Shah being Turkmen, but that's doubtful according to his own campaigns and official biography. The Nadir Shah's first enemies were the Turkmens of Turkmen Sahra. Well-known visitors of the region include Ármin Vámbéry, who wrote a book about his passage among Turkmens in Turkmen Sahra.

== See also ==
- Afsharid dynasty
- Ethnicities in Iran
- Iranian Turkmen
- Turkmen language
- Turkmen people
