= Durra Border Crossing =

Durra Border Crossing مركز حدود الدرة
- Carries: Pedestrians, Vehicles
- Locale: Aqaba, Jordan; Haql, Saudi Arabia
- Official name: Durra Border Crossing
- Maintained by: (Jordan) Aqaba Special Economic Zone Authority; Kingdom of Saudi Arabia

Durra Border Crossing (مركز حدود الدرة) is a border crossing between Aqaba in Jordan and Haql in Saudi Arabia. On the Jordanian side, the border terminal is maintained by the Aqaba Special Economic Zone Authority. The border crossing center is about 30 km (19 mi) from both Aqaba and Haql, and about 280 km (170 mi) from the Saudi city of Tabuk.

== History ==
The Durra border crossing was established in 1966 as a border crossing point. No immigration services were available at the crossing point. Crossing the border was only open to Jordanian and Saudi citizens, and required permits from the Governor of Aqaba or the Emir of the town of Haql. In 1988 the Durra crossing was promoted to a full crossing center with all immigration and visa services provided, and open to all nationalities.

== Services ==
In addition to being a border crossing center with visa issuance ability, the Durra border crossing has a branch for the Jordan Insurance Federation, and a free market zone on the Jordanian side. A gas station is available on the Saudi side of the border crossing center.
