= Field marshal (Jordan) =

Field Marshal of Jordan المشير في الأردن
- Shoulder insignia
- Country: Jordan
- Service branch: Royal Jordanian Army
- Rank group: Flag officer
- NATO rank code: OF-10
- Non-NATO rank: O-11
- Next higher rank: None
- Next lower rank: General
- Equivalent ranks: Admiral of the Fleet; Marshal of the Air

The rank of field marshal in Jordan represents the highest military distinctions in the Jordanian Armed Forces. The rank is called 'Mushir' (Arabic: مشير). It is awarded by the monarch and are typically reserved for the highest echelons of military leadership and for members of the royal family (Hashemites) who have demonstrated exemplary service and leadership in the defence of the kingdom.

Field marshals in Jordan are typically responsible for overseeing large-scale military operations, providing strategic direction, and advising the monarch on military matters. Their duties may include commanding army-level units and formations, developing and implementing defense strategies, liaising with other branches of the armed forces and allied military organizations, and representing Jordan in international military forums and alliances.

In Jordan the rank of marshal is the highest army rank (equivalent to a five-star General of the Army in the United States).

== Historical context ==
The rank of field marshal is a prestigious military title that has its origins in European military tradition, particularly within the British Army. Historically it denotes a senior military officer who commands army-level formations and holds significant strategic and operational command responsibilities. The rank of Marshal in Jordan is unique to the Jordanian military hierarchy. The title of field marshal, used in Jordan akin to its historical application within the Ottoman Empire, represents a prestigious military distinction, standing as the highest achievable rank in certain armed forces.

Its etymology dates back to the early Middle Ages, particularly during the era of the Frankish kings, originating from the ancient German term denoting the king's horse guard (from Old German Marh-scalc). In various nations, elevation to the position of field marshal traditionally necessitated military triumph in conflict, exemplified in the practices of Russia and Germany. Conversely, in other contexts such as Spain and Mexico, advancement to this rank was bestowed through popular decree, while in countries like France, Portugal, and Brazil, it could be conferred based on command of a military brigade.

The rank of marshal is often symbolic, emphasizing the monarch's supreme command over the armed forces.

== Insignia and uniform ==
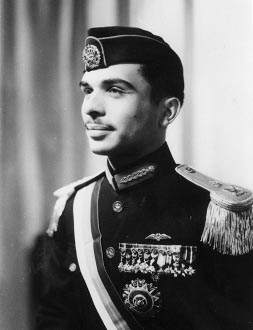
King Hussein in Military Regalia, 1953.

The insignia for Field Marshal in Jordan includes field marshal. Two crossed swords, signifying supreme command and authority, encircled by a laurel wreath and crowned by the Hashemite crown. Uniforms associated with this rank are characterized by ornate embellishments such as gold braid, epaulettes, and ceremonial swords, underscoring the esteemed status accorded to individuals holding this position.

== Holders ==
=== King Abdullah II ===
King Abdullah II of Jordan is one of the most notable holders of the rank of Marshal of Jordan. Having a military background and training at prestigious institutions like the Royal Military Academy Sandhurst, King Abdullah II has played a crucial role in modernizing the Jordanian Armed Forces and enhancing their operational capabilities.

=== King Hussein ===
King Hussein, the father of King Abdullah II, also held the rank of Marshal of Jordan. His reign saw significant military engagements and reforms, establishing a strong and professional military force in Jordan.

=== Others ===
No.	Portrait	Name	(Born – Died)	Appointed	Notes	ref.
1		Habis Majali	(1914–2001)	Sep 15, 1970	Chairman of the Joint Chiefs of Staff (1958-1975)	
2		Zaid ibn Shaker	(1934–2002)	June 1987	Chairman of the Joint Chiefs of Staff (1976–1988)	
3		Fat'hi Abu Taleb	(1933–2016)		Chairman of the Joint Chiefs of Staff (1988–1993)	
4		Abdel Hafez Ka'abneh	(1937–2016)		Chairman of the Joint Chiefs of Staff (1993–1999)	
5		Sa'ad Khair	(1956–2009)	May 5, 2005	Director of the General Intelligence Department (2000–2005)	
