= Director of the General Intelligence Department =

Head of the General Intelligence Department in Jordan

Director of General Intelligence Department
- مدير دائرة المخابرات العامة
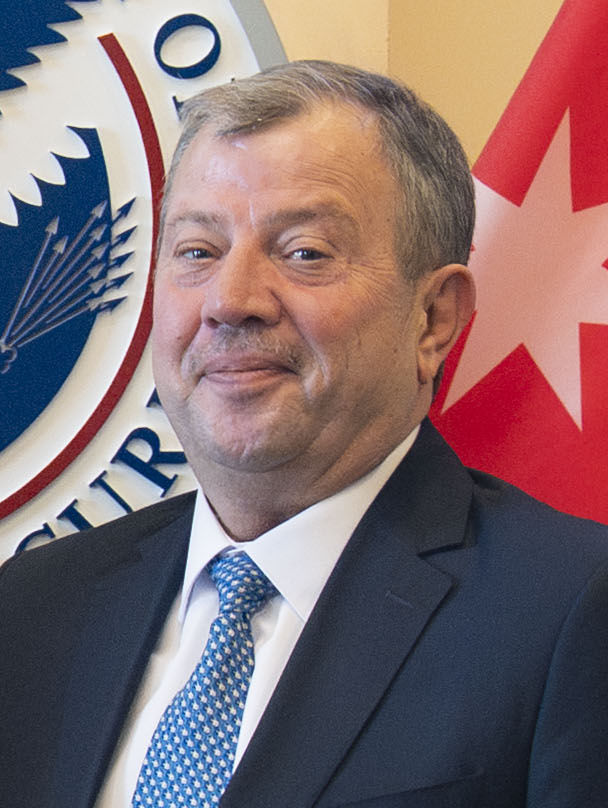
- Incumbent; Ahmad Hatoqay; Acting since 1 May 2019
- Style: His Excellency
- Reports to: King of Jordan
- Residence: Amman, Jordan
- Appointer: The King of Jordan
- Inaugural holder: Mohammad Rasoul Al–Kilani
- Formation: 1964; 62 years ago
- First holder: Mohammad Rasoul Al–Kilani
- Salary: Classified
- Website: GID website

The Director of the Jordanian General Intelligence Department (GID) holds a pivotal position within Jordan's national security apparatus. Obtaining specific details about the role's responsibilities and powers may be challenging due to the secretive nature of intelligence agencies and limited public disclosure. However, information about the GID and its operations can sometimes be found in analyses and reports from organizations specializing in security and intelligence matters. These sources often provide insights into the role and significance of intelligence agency in Jordan.

The Director of the GID is typically responsible for overseeing the intelligence activities of Jordan, both domestically and internationally. The director is also tasked with counterintelligence efforts to protect Jordan's interests from external and internal threats. The director is appointed by the King of Jordan, and the position reports directly to the monarch. The appointment process and criteria for selecting the director may not be publicly disclosed, as it involves sensitive national security considerations.

The GID is considered one of the most influential institutions in Jordan, with a significant role in shaping the country's security policies. The director wields considerable power and influence within Jordan's security establishment. The GID often collaborates closely with foreign intelligence agencies, particularly those of Western countries like the United States and the United Kingdom. The GID has played a crucial role in safeguarding Jordan's stability and security, particularly in the face of regional conflicts and terrorist threats. Past directors have been known for their discretion and effectiveness in managing intelligence operations.

== List of directors ==
| No. | Portrait | Director of Jordanian General Intelligence | Took office | Left office | Time in office | Ref. |
|---|---|---|---|---|---|---|
| 1 | Mohammad Rasoul Al–Kailani | Brigadier General; Mohammad Rasoul Al–Kailani (1933–2003); Founder and First Director of Jordanian Intelligence | 1964 | 1968 | 3–4 | |
| 2 | Mudar Badran | Major General; Mudar Badran (1934–2023) | 1968 | 1970 | 1–2 | |
| 3 | Natheer Rshaid | Brigadier General; Natheer Rshaid (1929–2024) | 1970 | 1974 | 3–4 | |
| 4 | Ahmad Obeidat | Lieutenant General; Ahmad Obeidat (1938–2026); The Longest-Serving Intelligence Director | 1974 | 1982 | 7–8 | |
| 5 | Tariq Alaa El-Din | Brigadier General; Tariq Alaa El-Din (1935–2024) | 1982 | 1989 | 6–7 | |
| 6 | Mustafa al-Qaisi | Major General; Mustafa al-Qaisi (1938–2019) | 1989 | 1996 | 6–7 | |
| 7 | Sameeh Al-Bateekhi | Lieutenant General; Sameeh Al-Bateekhi (born 1943); He received a 4-year prison sentence in 2003. | 1996 | 2000 | 3–4 | |
| 8 | Sa'ad Khair | Marshal; Sa'ad Khair (1956–2009); The only director of Jordanian intelligence to have achieved the rank of field marshal. | November 2000 | May 6, 2005 | 4–5 | |
| 9 | Samih Asfoura | Major General; Samih Asfoura; The Shortest Term for a Director of Intelligence | May 6, 2005 | December 20, 2005 | 228 days | |
| 10 | Mohammad Al-Dhahabi | Brigadier General; Mohammad Al-Dhahabi; He received a 13-year prison sentence in 2012 and was released in late 2023. | December 20, 2005 | December 29, 2008 | 3 years, 9 days | |
| 11 | Mohammad Al-Raqqad | Brigadier General; Mohammad Al-Raqqad (1965–2020) | December 30, 2008 | October 17, 2011 | 2 years, 291 days | |
| 12 | Faisal Al-Shoubaki | General; Faisal Al-Shoubaki | October 17, 2011 | March 30, 2017 | 5 years, 164 days | |
| 13 | Adnan Al-Jundi | Lieutenant General; Adnan Al-Jundi | March 30, 2017 | May 1, 2019 | 2 years, 32 days | |
| 14 | Ahmad Husni Hatoqay | Brigadier General; Ahmad Husni Hatoqay | May 1, 2019 | Incumbent | 7 years, 148 days | |
