= Mohammad Rasoul Al–Kailani =

Jordanian politician and general

Mohammad Rasoul Al-Kailani
- محمد رسول الكيلاني
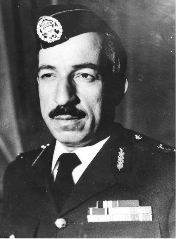
- Mohammad Rasoul Al-Kailani in 1968
- Born: March 30, 1933; As-Salt, Jordan
- Died: December 29, 2003 (aged 70)
- Citizenship: Jordan
- Occupations: Military personnel; Politician
- Employers: Jordanian Armed Forces; General Intelligence Directorate; The Senate of Jordan
- Family: Gilani (Kilani)

Mohammad Rasoul Al–Kailani (Arabic: محمد رسول الكيلاني, born on March 30, 1933 – died on December 29, 2003) was a Jordanian politician and military officer born in As-Salt. He received several medals and orders during his lifetime, including the Order of Independence (first and fourth class), Order of the Star (first class), and the Supreme Order of the Renaissance (fourth class). On May 25, 2021, he was honored by King Abdullah II of Jordan with a posthumous State Centenary Medal at an Independence Day celebration.

Al-Kailani played a significant role in Jordanian politics and military affairs. Throughout his career, he received several awards and held key positions in the government. From his upbringing in As-Salt to his career in intelligence and politics, he made notable contributions to Jordan. His life is intertwined with Jordan's political and security realms.

== Personal life and education ==
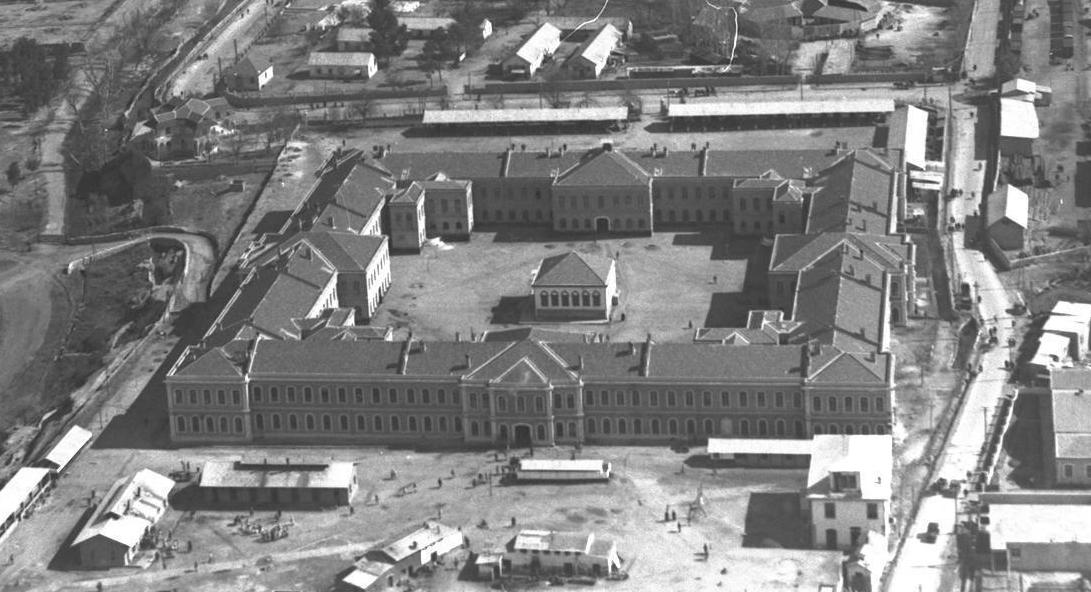
University of Damascus, now known as the University of Syria, where Al-Kailani studied.

Al-Kailani was born in As-Salt, the capital of Balqa and a bustling city at the heart of the country during the establishment of the Emirate of Transjordan on March 30, 1933. his family originates from nablus in palestine. His upbringing occurred amidst challenging economic and political circumstances. However, he benefitted from a household in which education was a priority. His father, the Sheikh Abdulhalim Al-Kailani, was the head of a local Sufi Zawiya and later became the town's Mufti. He is particularly notable for teaching a large percentage of Al-Salt's inhabitants how to read and write. Thus, he and his brothers Subhi, Musa, and Ibrahim had acquired some rudimentary academic skills before entering primary school. Known for his seriousness and commitment to study, Al-Kailani excelled in primary school and later enrolled in As-Salt Secondary School, the first of its kind in the Emirate of Transjordan. It was during his time at this institution that his national and political consciousness began to develop. He engaged with various prominent figures in the country across different spheres, and the school environment, influenced by its teachers and students, was characterized by an openness to political and military developments in the Arab region. Patriotic marches advocating for Arab freedom and genuine independence were common occurrences and deeply resonated with Al-Kailani.

An industrious and inquisitive student, Al-Kailani finished his high school studies and graduated from As-Salt School with a high school diploma. Wanting to continue his studies, he traveled to Damascus, for there were no universities in Jordan at this time. He completed his Bachelor's degree in Law from Syrian University, Damascus, in 1956. He further specialized in Financial and Economic Sciences at the same university in the same year.

Al-Kailani fathered eight children, including Abdulhalim Al-Kailani, who was mayor of Amman from 2012 to 2013.

== Career ==
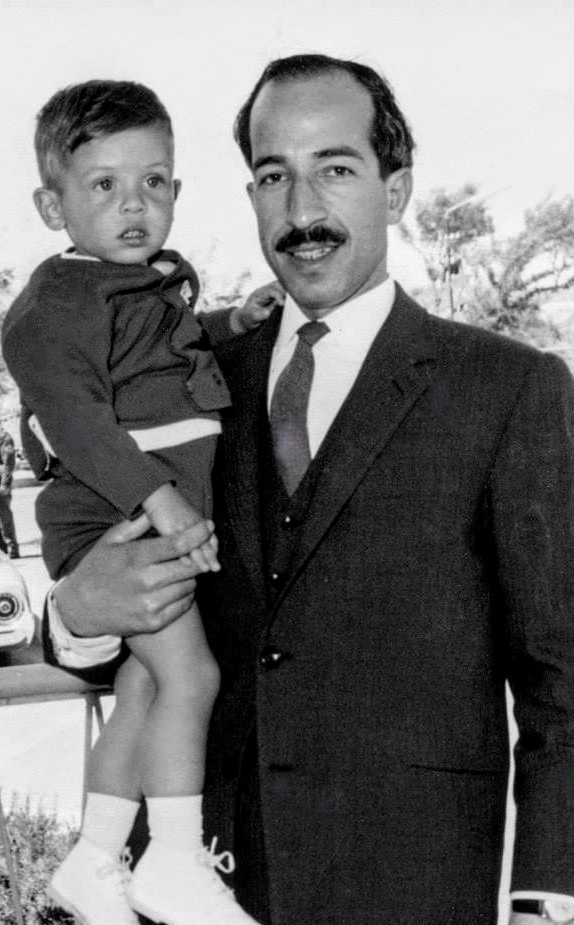
A photo from 1965 shows Al-Kailani holding a three-year-old King Abdullah II of Jordan.

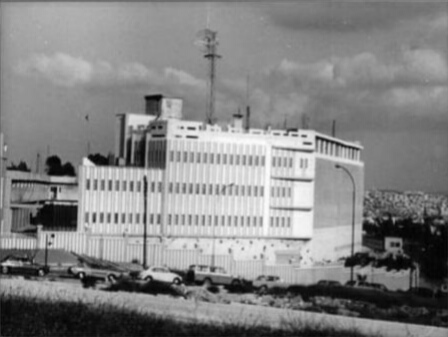
A picture from the early 1970s shows the old Jordanian general intelligence directorate (GID) building in Abdali, Amman. The building is often referred to as Abu Rasoul Hotel or Abu Rasoul Building by the Jordanian community, a reference to Al-Kailani.

He joined military service with the rank of first lieutenant in 1957. A prosecutor in the Armed Forces, Al-Kailani's initial claim to fame was uncovering a coup plot against King Hussein orchestrated by high-ranking officers in the military, headed by General Mahmoud al Rousan. Whilst interrogating the officers, he was assisted by CIA attaché in Amman Jack O'Connell. The officers had confessed that the plot in Jordan was connected to a parallel one in Iraq. When a meeting was hastily arranged with Iraqi Commander-in-Chief Rafiq Arif on July 10, 1958, he dismissed their warnings. The Iraqi plot was carried out successfully four days later. He would foil another plot by General Sadeq Al-Shara'a the following year.

Al-Kailani's professional journey included roles such as Human Rights Advisor in Public Security Directorate (PSD) from 1960 to 1962 and Director of the "Political Investigations Office" from 1962 to 1964. His lasting legacy was the founding, along with King Hussein, of the General Intelligence Directorate. During his tenure, one of the agency's most important accomplishments was its detection of Israeli forces mobilizing along the Jordanian border before the Battle of Al-Karameh, ensuring a Jordanian victory. Then, he served as Jordan Public Security Director from 1968 to 1969.

His career had peaked in 1969, when he was appointed the Minister of Interior, effectively the third most important man in the country. This appointment came at a particularly trying time, as tensions between the Jordanian Armed Forces and the leftist Fedayeen were beginning to boil over. He served until King Hussein and Yasser Arafat reached the ten-point edict. Following this, he tendered his resignation, accusing certain Jordanian government officials of attempting to frame him as the instigator of a potential conflict which he had sought to avoid. After the main phase of Black September, he was appointed Advisor to the King for National Security in 1971 and later served as Ambassador to the Ministry of Foreign Affairs from 1971 to 1972.

Continuing his involvement in national security, Al-Kailani simultaneously served as Advisor to the King for National Security and Director of General Intelligence from 1973 to 1974. In 1984, assumed the position of Jordanian Ambassador to Saudi Arabia, contributing to diplomatic relations between the two nations until 1988. Al-Kailani's public service extended into the legislative realm as he held positions in the Tenth and Eleventh Senate from 1988 to 1993. Recognized for his contributions, he later served as an Advisor to the King from 1993 to 1996. His commitment to governance led him to a subsequent term in the Senate from 1997 to 2001. He attained the rank of lieutenant general in the military.

Al-Kailani faced several assassination attempts, the last occurring in the late 1990s when his car was set on fire.

=== Positions ===
- 1960 - 1962: Legal Advisor, Public Security.
- 1962 - 1964: Director of the Office of Political Investigations.
- 1964 - 1968: First Director of the Jordanian General Intelligence Department.
- 1968 - 1969: Director of Public Security.
- 1969 - 1970: Minister of the Interior.
- 1971: National Security Advisor.
- 1971 - 1973: Ambassador Extraordinary to the Ministry of Foreign Affairs.
- 1973 - 1974: King Hussein's National Security Advisor and Director of Intelligence.
- 1984 - 1988: Jordanian Ambassador to the Kingdom of Saudi Arabia.
- 1988 - 1993: Member of the Jordanian Senate.
- 1993 - 1996: King Hussein's National Security Advisor.
- 1996 - 2003: Member of the Jordanian Senate.

== Honors and awards ==
Throughout his career, Mohammad Rasoul Al–Kailani received several decorations:

=== Local Honours ===
- Jordan:
  - Order of Independence, First Class.
  - Order of the Star, First class.
  - Supreme Order of the Renaissance.

=== Foreign Honours ===
- Lebanon:
  - National Order of the Cedar, First Class.
  - Al-Munir Al-Maqdisi, First Class.

== Death ==
He died on December 30, 2003. At the time of his death, he was widely considered to be the most formidable and strict leader of the General Intelligence Service.

== Confiscation ==
In 2012, the assets belonging to Al-Kailani and his son underwent confiscation. This action followed a ruling issued by the Amman Court of First Instance, which imposed a temporary seizure on their properties and real estate due to outstanding payments related to commercial transactions, such as housing construction projects. The ruling encompassed nine individuals, including the late Al-Kailani's wives and children, as well as land and real estate holdings in Mafraq, Zarqa, and Amman. The seizure order remains valid and will be enforced if the outstanding payments are not settled by the heirs.
