= Ibrahim Youssouf Ibrahim Izziddin =

Jordanian diplomat (born 1934)

Jordanian Ambassador to Switzerland of Jordan to Switzerland
- In office March 25, 1975 – April 22, 1977
- Preceded by: Jamal Khutat
- Succeeded by: Mutasem Bilbeisi

Jordanian Ambassador to Germany of Jordan to Germany
- In office April 22, 1977 – 1978
- Preceded by: Nijmeddin Dajani
- Succeeded by: Nahib Amr Al-Nimer

Jordanian Ambassador to the United Kingdom of Jordan to United Kingdom
- In office 1978–1983
- Preceded by: Ma'an Abu Nowar
- Succeeded by: Hani Bahjat Tabbara

Jordanian Ambassador to the United States of Jordan to United States
- In office June 29, 1983 appointed – 1983
- Preceded by: Sultan Lufti
- Succeeded by: Mohammed Kamal

Personal details
- Born: December 3, 1934 (age 91) Beirut
- Parents: Yousef Izzidin (father); Rushdiah Fakhuri (mother)
- Education: 1955 Bachelor of Arts in Political Science of the American University of Beirut

Ibrahim Youssouf Ibrahim Izziddin (born December 3, 1934) is a retired Jordanian Ambassador.

== Career ==
- From 1955 to 1958 he was employed in the Ministry of Communication, Prime Ministers Office and Press Section of Ministry of Foreign Affairs.
- From 1958 to 1965 he was deputy director of Book Publishers, Beirut.
- From 1965 to 1968 he was director of foreign Press in the ministry of Information.
- From 1968 to 1970 he was Press Secretary of Hussein of Jordan.
- From 1970 to 1971 he was director of public Relations of Royal Jordanian.
- From 1971 to 1975 he was Under Secretary of the ministry of Information .
- From 25.03.1975 to April 22, 1977 he was ambassador in Bern (Switzerland).
- From April 22, 1977 to 1978 he was ambassador in Bonn (Germany).
- From 1978 to 1983 he was ambassador in London (United Kingdom).
- On June 29, 1983 he was appointed ambassador in Washington, D.C. where he was accredited on May 22, 1985 to serve as president of the Civil Service Commission in Amman.
- In 2002 he was appointed director General of the Shoman Foundation.
- In 2006 he was appointed President of the Higher Media Council of Jordan.
