= Jordan–Saudi Arabia border =

International boundary between Jordan and Saudi Arabia

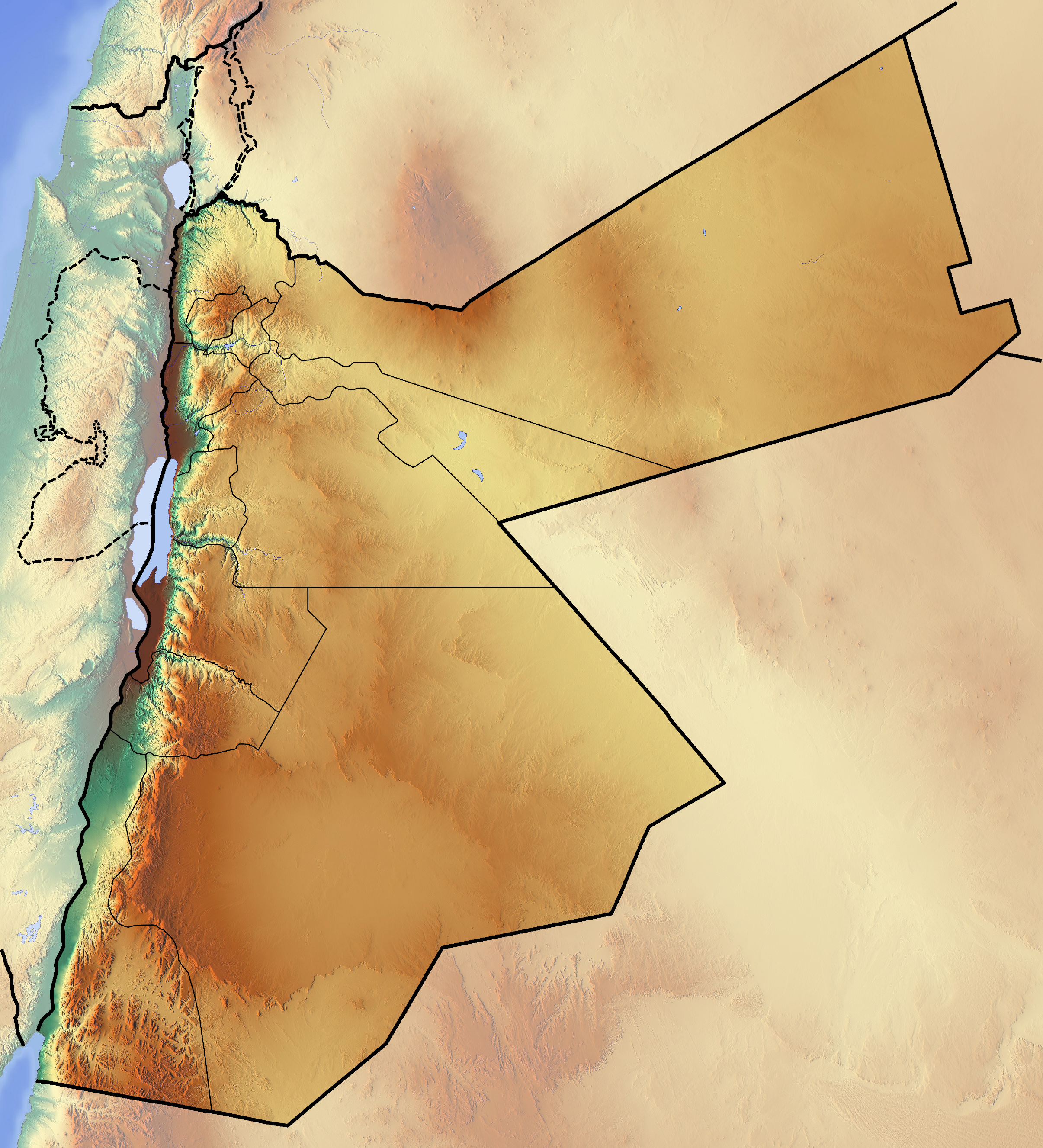
A map of Jordan with Saudi Arabia to the south-east; the large triangle of land in Saudi Arabia that points towards the Dead Sea is apocryphally known as "Winston's Hiccup".

The border between Jordan and Saudi Arabia is 731km (454mi) in length and runs from the Gulf of Aqaba in the south-west to the tripoint with Iraq in the north-east.

== Description ==
The border starts in the south-west at Gulf of Aqaba, and then consists of nine straight lines that proceed broadly north-eastwards to the Iraqi tripoint. The abruptly concave section of the boundary in the north is apocryphally named "Winston's Hiccup" (Arabic: حازوقة وينستون), also referred to as "Churchill's Sneeze."

== History ==
At the start of the 20th century, the Ottoman Empire controlled what is now Jordan, with the interior regions further south consisting of loosely organised Arab groupings, occasionally forming emirates, most prominent of which was the Emirate of Nejd and Hasa ruled by the al-Saud family. During the First World War an Arab Revolt, supported by Britain, succeeded in removing the Ottomans from most of the Middle East.

In the period following this, Ibn Saud managed to expand his kingdom considerably, eventually proclaiming the Kingdom of Saudi Arabia in 1932.

As a result of the secret 1916 Anglo-French Sykes–Picot Agreement, Britain gained control of the southern half of the Ottoman Syria Vilayet, with the north going to France (as the Mandate of Syria). The southern half of the vilayet (roughly equivalent to modern western Jordan) was contested between Britain, the newly formed Arab Kingdom of Syria, the Kingdom of Hejaz, and the Jews in Mandatory Palestine, resulting in a confused period in which the region was essentially an ungoverned space.

Eventually, in 1921, Britain declared a mandate over the region, creating the Emirate of Transjordan, under the semi-autonomous rule of Emir (and future King) Abdullah I.

The southern border between Transjordan and Arabia was considered strategic for Transjordan to avoid being landlocked, with intended access to the sea via the Port of Aqaba. The southern region of Ma'an-Aqaba, a large area with a population of only 10,000, was administered by Occupied Enemy Territory Administration (OETA) East (later the Arab Kingdom of Syria, and then Mandatory Transjordan) and claimed by the Kingdom of Hejaz. In OETA East, Faisal had appointed a kaymakam (sub-governor) at Ma'an; the kaymakam at Aqaba, who "disregarded both Husein in Mecca and Feisal in Damascus with impunity", had been instructed by Hussein to extend his authority to Ma'an. This technical dispute did not become an open struggle, and the Kingdom of Hejaz was to take de facto control after Faisal's administration was defeated by the French. (Note: Baker explained, "The British had moved in to take advantage of the situation created by Husain's presence in Aqaba and pressed for the annexation of the Hejaz Vilayet of Ma'an to the mandated territory of Transjordan. This disputed area, containing Maan, Aqaba and Petra, had originally been part of the Damascus Vilayet during Ottoman times, though boundaries had never been very precise. It was seized first by the Army as it pushed north from Aqaba after 1917 and had then been included in O.E.T.A. East and, later, in Faisal's kingdom of Syria. Husain, however, had never accepted this and had stationed a Vali alongside Faisal's administrator, but the two men had worked in harmony so that the dispute never came to an open struggle. After Faisal's exile, the French mandate boundary had excluded this area and the British then considered it to be part of the Syrian rump which became Transjordan, though nothing was done to realise that claim, so Hejaz administration held de facto control. Britain had, however, made its position clear in August 1924 when it cabled Bullard: 'Please inform King Hussein officially that H.M.G. cannot acquiesce in his claim to concern himself directly with the administration of any portion of the territory of Transjordan for which H.M.G. are responsible under the mandate for Palestine'".) After the 1924–25 Saudi conquest of Hejaz, Hussein's army fled to the Ma'an region (which was then formally announced as annexed by Abdullah's Transjordan). In 1925 Britain and Ibn Saud signed the Treaty of Hadda, which created a border between Jordan and Saudi territory consisting of six straight lines. Crucially, this border gave Transjordan a short outlet on the Gulf of Aqaba. The border was later confirmed by the 1927 Treaty of Jeddah.

In the early 1960s, discussions were held which resulted in a treaty on 9 August 1965; thus creating the current boundary alignment of nine lines, as well as granting Jordan a slightly increased coast (by 18km) along the Gulf of Aqaba.

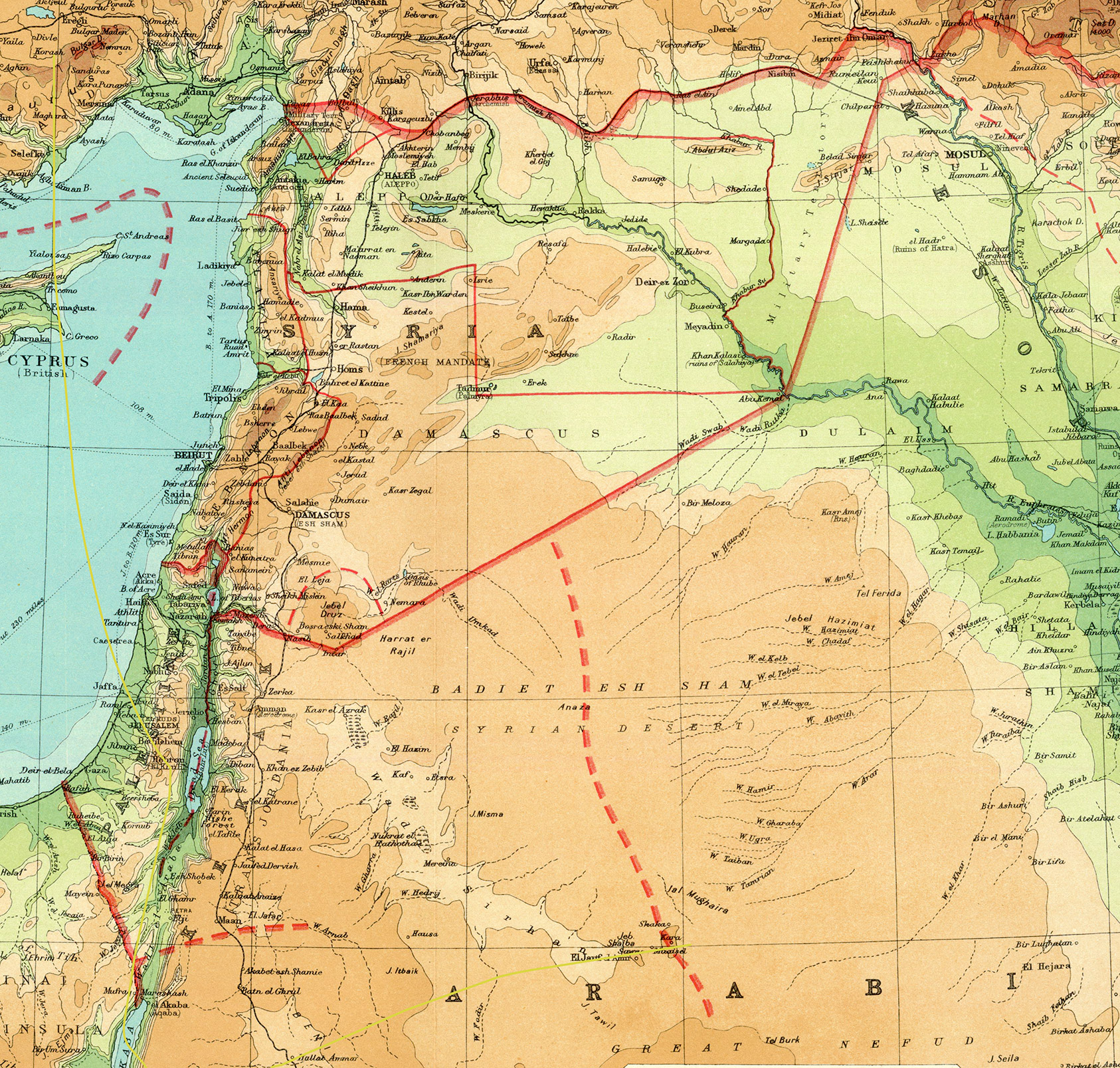
Contemporary 1922 map, showing the borders still undefined

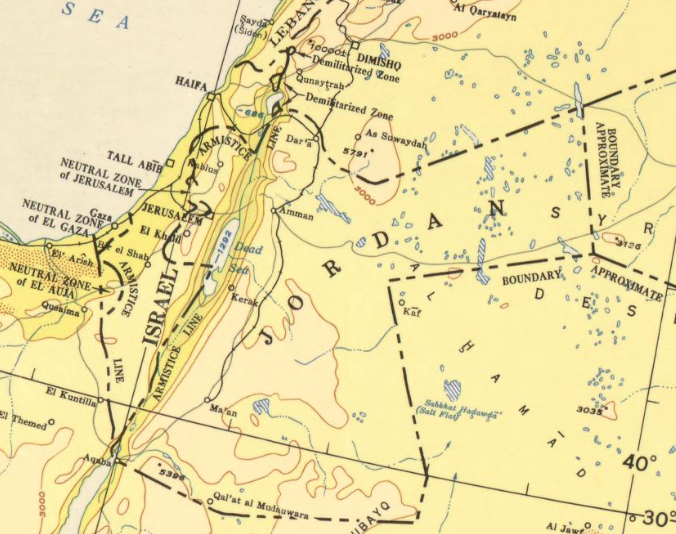
Contemporary 1955 map, showing the oasis town of Kaf, whose exchange in 1925 created the “hiccup”

Two contemporary maps and a diagram showing the border changes between 1922 and 1965

=== 'Winston's Hiccup' ===
The urban myth of the 'Winston Hiccup' arose based on an account of Winston Churchill (then serving as the Secretary of State for the Colonies) boasting in his later years that he had created the British protectorate of Transjordan in 1921 "with the stroke of a pen, one Sunday afternoon in Cairo"; some stories purport that this drawing of the boundary took place following a "particularly liquid lunch".

According to Warren Dockter, it likely stems from “a misquote from Churchill's speech in the House of Commons on 24 March 1936 when Churchill declared, 'The Emir Abdullah is in TransJordania where I put him one Sunday afternoon at Jerusalem.'” Churchill was in Jerusalem for the Cairo Conference between Friday 25 March and Wednesday 30 March 1921; he was to have his first meeting with Abdullah on Monday 28 March. The borders between Transjordan and the Sultanate of Nejd (the predecessor of Saudi Arabia) were not, in fact, discussed at the 1921 Cairo Conference.

In July 1922, Ibn Saud's Wahabi forces took Jauf, and in September Abdullah's forces took Kaf. The hiccup was first sketched out in October 1922 by the Colonial Office during Abdullah's visit to London. (Note: Paris writes: “During his visit to London in October 1922, Abdullah agreed formally to concede Jauf to Ibn Saud, provided Azraq and Kaf remained in Transjordan and the Wahhabis were prevented from moving beyond Jauf or towards the Hijaz railway between Ma‘an and Medina. With Abdullah’s objectives in mind, the Colonial Office proposed a specific border to Samuel that left both Kaf and the air route within Transjordan. The suggested boundary did not differ significantly from the present Saudi-Jordanian border, except that the 1922 proposal placed approximately 60 miles of Wadi Sirhan in Transjordan, and the Wadi is now held almost entirely by Saudi Arabia.”) The first formal definition of the boundary between Transjordan and Nejd was the result of negotiations between the British Government and the Sultan of Nejd starting in 1922, negotiated further at the failed 1923-24 Kuwait Conference, and concluded with the Al Hadda Agreement on November 2, 1925. Sir Gilbert Clayton conducted the talks with the sultan as British representative; Churchill had no involvement in the Al Hadda Agreement during which time he was the British Chancellor of the Exchequer.

The “hiccup” resulted from giving the strategic Wadi Sirhan region, and its then primary settlement of Kaf, which had previously been occupied by Abdullah at the urging of the British, to the Sultanate of Nejd. The 1925 treaty did not create the sharp triangular point in the "hiccup" but instead a short north–south segment of 9.24 km along the 37th meridian east.

Kamal Salibi commented about Churchill's pen stroke in The Modern History of Jordan,

Contrary to Winston Churchill's frequently quoted boast, the country was not really created by a stroke of his pen on a Sunday afternoon in 1921. As already indicated, [Emir] Abdullah in that year had already established himself in Amman by his own initiative, when the British agreed to grant him a six-month option to demonstrate his ability to govern the Transjordanian territory as part of their Palestinian mandate.

== Settlements near the border ==
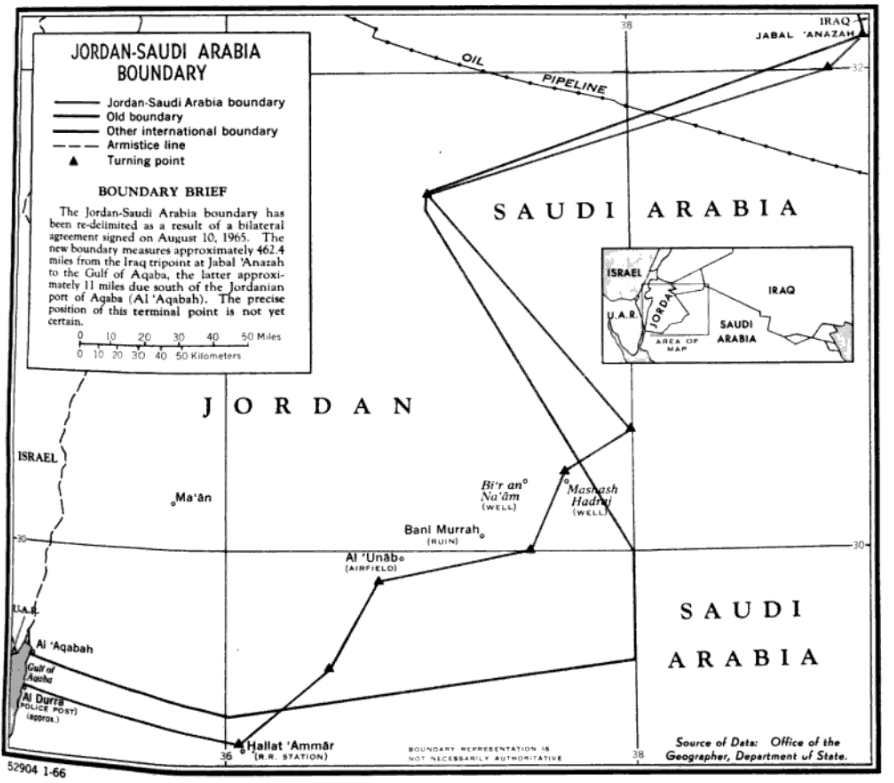
Map of the Jordan–Saudi Arabia border showing the old and new alignments

=== Jordan ===
- Mudawwara

=== Saudi Arabia ===
- Al-Haditha
- Al Fiyad
- Al Isawiyah
- An Nabk
- Halat Ammar
- Haql
- Qurayyat
- Qullayib Khudr
- Tubarjal
- Turaif

== Border Crossings ==
There are currently three official border crossings:

- Umari
- Mudawwara
- Durra Border Crossing

== See also ==
- Al Harrah, Saudi Arabia
- Al Jawf Province
- Amman Governorate
- Azraq
- British Mandate of Palestine
- Geography of Jordan
- Jordan-Saudi Arabia relations
- Geography of Saudi Arabia
- Zarqa Governorate

== Sources ==
- Baker, Randall (1979). King Husain and the Kingdom of Hejaz. The Oleander Press. p. 220. ISBN 978-0-900891-48-9.
- Leatherdale, Clive (1983). Britain and Saudi Arabia, 1925-1939: The Imperial Oasis. Psychology Press. pp. 41–42. ISBN 978-0-7146-3220-9.
- Paris, Timothy J. (2003). Britain, the Hashemites and Arab Rule: The Sherifian Solution. Routledge. ISBN 978-1-135-77191-1.
- Wilson, Mary Christina (1990). King Abdullah, Britain and the Making of Jordan. Cambridge University Press. ISBN 978-0-521-39987-6.
