= Omar Nimr Nabulsi =

Jordanian diplomat (born 1936)

- عمر النابلسي

Jordanian Minister of Economy
- In office 1970–1972

Jordanian Ambassador to the United Kingdom of Jordan to United Kingdom
- In office 1972 – June 1973
- Preceded by: Zaid al-Rifai
- Succeeded by: Ma'an Abu Nowar

Jordanian Minister of Agriculture
- In office June 1973 – November 1973

Jordanian Minister of Economy
- In office November 1973 – 1974

Jordanian Minister of Labour and Construction
- In office 1980–1980

Personal details
- Born: April 1, 1936 (age 90) Nablus
- Spouse: in 1966 married to Haifa Hatough
- Children: 2 sons
- Parents: Nimr Nablusi (father); Safia Ali (mother)
- Education: Ain Shams University Cairo, LL.B. of the London University.

Omar Nimr Nabulsi (born April 1, 1936) is a retired Jordanian Ambassador.

== Career ==
- From 1959 to 1961 he was Legal Adviser of the Saudi Automotive Services Company (Sasco Petroleum), Tripoli (Libya).
- From 1961 to 1969 he was Legal and Political Attaché at the Arab League.
- From 1960 to 1970 he was assistant director at the Royal Court of Jordan.
- From 1970 to 1972 he was Minister of Economy in the cabinet of Wasfi al-Tal.
- From 1972 to June 1973 he was ambassador in London (United Kingdom), with concurrent Diplomatic accreditation in The Hague and Lisbon.
- From June 1973 to November 1973 he was minister of agriculture in the cabinet of Zaid al-Rifai.
- From November 1973 to 1974 he was minister of economy. in the cabinet of Zaid al-Rifai.
- From 1975 to 1977 he was legal and economic adviser to Arab Fund for Economic and Social Development in Kuwait City..
- From 1977 to 1980 he was Lawyer and Consultant in Corporate and Business Legal affairs.
- In 1980 he was Minister of Labor and Construction.
- From 1989 to 1993 he was appointed Senator.
- He was Member of the National Consultative Council of Jordan.
- He is a first class member of the Order of the Star of Jordan.
