= Jordan–Saudi Arabia relations =

- Jordan: Saudi Arabia

Diplomatic mission
- Embassy of Jordan, Riyadh: Embassy of Saudi Arabia, Amman

Jordan–Saudi Arabia relations are characterized by mutual recognition and exchange of embassies.

== History ==
=== Dynasties; background ===
Jordan and Saudi Arabia are both Sunni monarchies. Historically, the Hashemite dynasty came to Jordan from the Hijaz, which is now part of Saudi Arabia. During World War 1 the Hashemite family, under Sharif Hussein bin Ali, led an armed uprising, the Arab Revolt, against Ottoman rule. In return, the United Kingdom promised the Hashemites territory in the region during the McMahon-Hussein correspondence. This led to the establishment of the Kingdom of Hejaz, currently in modern day Saudi Arabia, established in 1916 with Hussein Bin Ali as its King. At the same time the House of Saud expanded its influence in the Nejd region with the Wahabist movement, a religious movement within Sunni Islam. This alliance was key in establishing the modern Kingdom of Saudi Arabia.

The Hashemites and Sauds clashed over territorial and religious authority in the region. This resulted in two wars, the Al-Khurma dispute in 1918-19 and the Saudi conquest of the Hejaz in 1924-25 in which the Saudi Sultanate of the Nejd annexed the Hashemite Kingdom of the Hejaz. Despite having British support during WW1 the United Kingdom did not assist the Hashemites in this conflict. During the Saudi conquest of the Hejaz after a series of military defeats, King Hussein of the Hashemite family abdicated from all of his secular titles in 1924 and gave them to his son Ali bin Hussein before fleeing to Aqaba, under the rule of his son Abdullah I bin Al-Hussein, and then Cyprus after being exiled by the British. After a brief rule from 1924-25 Saudi forces finally took over the Hashmite Kingdom of the Hejaz incorporating it into the new Kingdom of Hejaz and Nejd under Abdulaziz al-Saud.

The Hashemites ruled Mecca from 1916 until 1925, when the House of Saud annexed the area in the Saudi conquest of Hejaz. Hejaz is located on the west coast of modern-day Saudi Arabia, bordering the Red Sea. Since the rule of Muhammad bin Saud in 1720, the House of Saud remained as the governing family ever since.

=== British Mandate/Emirate of Trans-Jordan ===
The two cities of Aqaba and Ma'an were part of the Kingdom of Hejaz (1916–1925). In May 1925, Ibn Saud gave up the Aqaba and Ma'an districts of the Hejaz and it became part of British Emirate of Transjordan.

=== 1965 land swap ===
Map of 1965 land swap between Jordan and Saudi Arabia. Green: ceded to Saudi Arabia by Jordan, Red: ceded to Jordan by Saudi Arabia

In 1965, Saudi Arabia and Jordan agreed to trade land, thus finalising the Jordan–Saudi Arabia border. Jordan gained 19 kilometers of land on the Gulf of Aqaba and 6,000 square kilometers of territory in the interior, and 7,000 square kilometers of Jordanian-administered, landlocked territory was ceded to Saudi Arabia.

=== Current situation ===
According to a 2013 Pew global opinion poll, 88% of Jordanians express a favourable view of Saudi Arabia, with 11% expressing an unfavourable view, the most favourable opinion of Saudi Arabia in the Middle East.

After the elevation of Mohammed bin Salman to Saudi Crown Prince, relations have deteriorated over Saudi attempts to sideline Jordan in negotiations over the Israeli–Palestinian conflict, Jordan's reluctant support of Saudi Arabia during the 2017–18 Qatar diplomatic crisis and limited involvement in the Saudi-led intervention in Yemen, and growing Jordanian ties with Turkey.

In 2019, Saudi Arabia concluded an agreement with Jordan to provide assistance and support to the educational sector for $50 million.

On 22 June 2022, Abdullah II of Jordan met with Saudi Arabian Crown Prince Mohammed bin Salman. They discussed bilateral relations, investment plans and Joe Biden's Middle East visit in July.

== Resident diplomatic missions ==
- Jordan has an embassy in Riyadh and a consulate-general in Jeddah.
- Saudi Arabia has an embassy in Amman.

== See also ==
- Foreign relations of Jordan
- Foreign relations of Saudi Arabia
