= Adnan Abu Odeh =

Jordanian politician (1933–2022)

Member of the Senate
- In office 1974–1982

Minister of Culture
- In office 16 September 1970 – 14 October 1972
- Preceded by: Abdelmunim Rifai
- Succeeded by: Ma'an Abu Nowar

Personal details
- Born: 10 November 1933 Nablus, Mandatory Palestine
- Died: 2 February 2022 (aged 88) Amman, Jordan
- Party: Hizb ut-Tahrir (1953–1955)
- Education: Damascus University

Adnan Abu Odeh (Arabic: عدنان أبو عودة; 10 November 1933 – 2 February 2022) was a Jordanian politician. He was Minister of Culture from 1970 to 1972 and served in the Senate from 1974 to 1982.

Abu Odeh died in Amman on 2 February 2022, at the age of 88.
