= General Intelligence Department (Jordan) =

Jordanian Intelligence Department

General Intelligence Department (GID)
- دائرة المخابرات العامة
- Official Seal of the GID

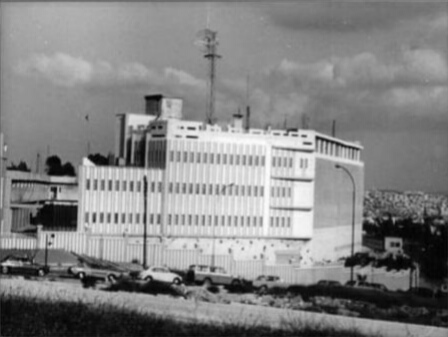
- The old GID building in Abdali, Amman in 1970s

Agency overview
- Formed: 1964; 62 years ago
- Preceding agency: General Investigation Department
- Type: Component of the Intelligence Community
- Headquarters: Amman, Jordan
- Annual budget: Classified
- Agency executive: General Ahmad Husni Hatoqay, Director
- Website: gid.gov.jo

Jordanian General Intelligence Department, (GID) or Mukhabarat (Arabic: دائرة المخابرات العامة) is the primary civilian foreign and domestic intelligence agency of the Hashemite Kingdom of Jordan. It functions as both a foreign and domestic intelligence agency as well as a law enforcement force within the country. The GID is reportedly one of the most important and professional intelligence agencies in the Middle East and the world; the agency has been instrumental in foiling several terrorist attacks around the world.

Before the establishment of the General Intelligence Directorate, intelligence and security work in Jordan was handled by the General Investigation Department from 1952 to 1964. The transition was formalized under Act No. 24 of 1964. Since its establishment, the GID has remained the principal institution in Jordan's intelligence and security system.

The Director of the General Intelligence Directorate is appointed by royal decree on the basis of a decision by the Council of Ministers. The agency forms part of Jordan's state security structure. Its officers are recruited according to specified educational and security requirements, including university-level qualifications and vetting procedures.

Under its legal framework, the GID is responsible for matters related to Jordan's internal and external security. Its work includes intelligence collection, counterintelligence, and other security functions assigned through the executive authorities. The agency also maintains cooperation with foreign intelligence services, including the CIA and MI6, and is active beyond Jordan in regional intelligence matters.

== Law and establishment ==
Before the establishment of the General Intelligence Directorate (GID), Jordanian intelligence functions were carried out by the General Investigation Department (Arabic: دائرة المباحث العامة) from 1952 to 1964. The establishment of the GID was formalized by Act No. 24 of 1964, which underwent all necessary constitutional procedures. This legislation created a centralized intelligence agency directly linked to the Prime Minister's office.

The Director of the GID is appointed by a royal decree based on a decision from the Council of Ministers. Officers within the agency are also appointed through royal decree upon the recommendation of the Director-General, subject to extensive security vetting and educational qualifications.

== Mission ==
As quoted from the official GID Site, their mission is

to contribute to the safeguarding of the Kingdom and the Nation under the Hashemite leadership of His Majesty King Abdullah II bin al Hussein, as well as protecting the freedoms of the Jordanian people and preserving a democratic form of government. It is our objective to share with others the responsibility of building the proper grounds that leads to create an environment of security and stability, which will reflect prosperously on all sectors of the Nation, providing the confidence to all types of local and foreign investors to operate in a reliable and secure atmosphere.

In practice, the agency is notoriously known for its extensive activity in Jordan and throughout the Middle East, as well as its cooperation with American and British intelligence. Through a complex spying system, it plays a central role in preserving stability in Jordan and monitoring seditious activity. The GID is believed to be the CIA's closest partner after MI6.

== History ==
=== Establishment ===
In the 1950s, security and intelligence functions in Jordan were handled by more than one agency, including the General Investigations Department of the Public Security Directorate and the Political Investigations Office. These bodies were responsible for political monitoring and intelligence work.

The General Intelligence Directorate was established in 1964 under Law No. 24 of 1964. The new agency assumed functions previously carried out by the General Investigations Department and the Political Investigations Office, and it operated under the prime ministerial framework.

After the GID was established, it assumed control of the files of the former General Investigation Department. These records included thousands of reports, many of which had been compiled from informant material. Mudar Badran and his team later conducted a review of the archive, during which about 70,000 files described as inaccurate or no longer needed were destroyed in the presence of Prime Minister Wasfi al-Tal.

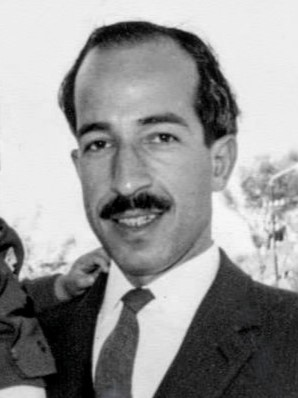
A photo of Mohammad Rasoul Al-Kailani, the first Director of the General Intelligence Directorate, taken in 1965, one year after its founding.

Mohammad Rasoul Al-Kailani was one of the figures involved in the developments that led to the establishment of the General Intelligence Directorate (GID). He was among those associated with the early planning for a centralized intelligence body. During that period, Jordan was facing regional and internal political tensions, including disputes with neighboring regimes, domestic party activity, and tension along the armistice line with Israel.

Before the Six-Day War, Mudar Badran and three other senior officers attended an advanced intelligence training course in London as part of the early development of the GID. The delegation included Hani Tabbarah, Rajai Dajani, and Tariq Aladdin. The trip was part of broader efforts to build the agency's institutional capacity.

In Al-Qarar ("The Decision"), Mudar Badran writes about night meetings held at the GID headquarters with King Hussein. He states that the meetings were attended by several officers, including Adeeb Tahboub, Ahmad Obeidat, Tariq Aladdin, Adnan Abu Odeh, and GID Director Mohammad Rasoul Al-Kailani. According to Badran, the king encouraged those present to speak openly and share their views and analyses.

=== Historical contributions and operations ===
Following the events of Black September, the GID became one of the main agencies responsible for internal security in Jordan. It later developed close cooperation with foreign intelligence services in counterterrorism work. According to published accounts, Jordanian intelligence shared information with the United States on a number of security threats before the September 11 attacks. One of these accounts states that in 1999 Jordanian intelligence warned the CIA of a plot against American interests in Europe originating in Bosnia. intercepted an encrypted message referring to a planned large-scale attack inside the United States using aircraft, with the message calling it "The Big Wedding," which later turned out to be the code name for the September 11 attacks. The GID passed this information to U.S. authorities, although the warning did not include enough detail to prevent the attacks. Nevertheless, Jordanian intelligence is credited with forewarning the possibility of aircraft being used as human missiles in a major attack within America—a scenario previously uncommon before 2001. Notably, Jordan was not the only country to warn Washington (other countries such as Egypt also provided alerts), but the Jordanian warning was distinctive in explicitly mentioning "the use of aircraft".

The agency has also been described as active in regional counterterrorism operations beyond Jordan. Reports by U.S. and other sources state that Jordanian intelligence helped track Abu Musab Al-Zarqawi, the leader of al-Qaeda in Iraq, leading to his assassination in a U.S. airstrike in 2006. Other reports state that a number of al-Qaeda detainees were held in Jordan, including Khalid Shaikh Mohammed and Persian Gulf chief Abd al-Rahim al Nashiri. The reliance of US intelligence on its Jordanian counterpart was forged in part by both countries' aversion to Islamic radicalism. Foreign Policy magazine described Jordanian intelligence as achieving "significant victories" in the war on terror, such as overthrowing Zarqawi and helping suppress the Sunni insurgency in Iraq in 2006.

==== Foiling intervention in a civil conflict – 1970 ====
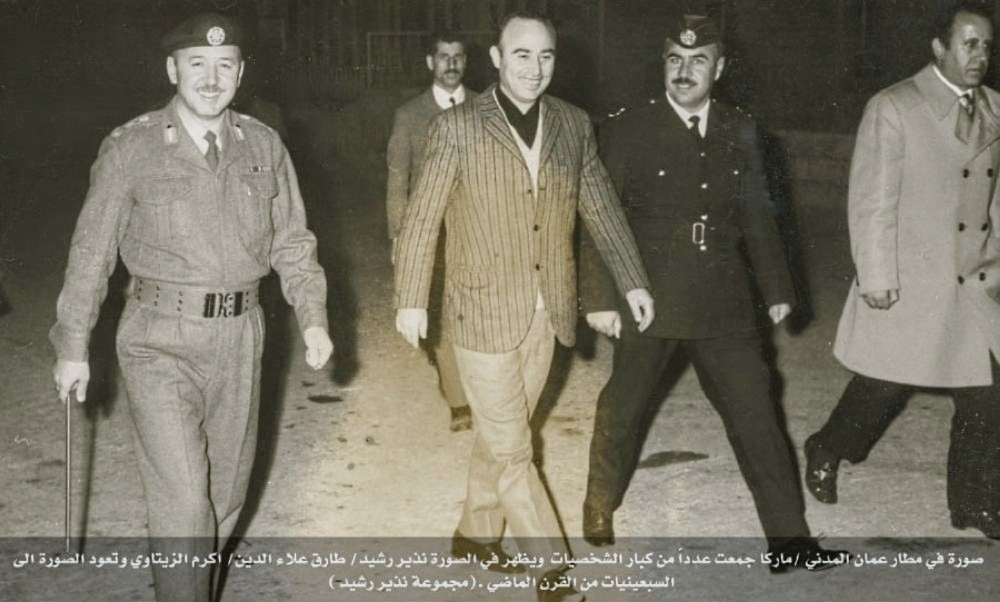
Natheer Rshaid, Tariq Alaa Al-Din, and Akram Al-Zeitawi, from left to rightat Amman Civil Airport, Marka back to the early 1970s

In September 1970, during the Black September civil war, (fedayeen) had become a "state within a state" in Jordan, and a force of 20,000 Iraqi troops stationed in eastern Jordan seemed poised to back the insurgents. To neutralize this threat without direct foreign intervention, Jordanian intelligence chief Natheer Rshaid orchestrated an elaborate deception. GID agents obtained real military planning documents through a European officer in Amman and used them to forge a fake U.S. battle plan for the Middle East. These forged plans suggested that the United States and Jordan were preparing a lightning airstrike to annihilate any Iraqi forces that intervened in the conflict. The disinformation was slipped to the Iraqi high command via a double agent, causing Baghdad to believe any move against Hussein would trigger American military retaliation. The ruse worked brilliantly: Iraqi units stood down and never came to the fedayeen's aid, allowing Jordan's army to defeat the PLO fighters on its own. This intelligence coup was strategically vital – it averted an Iraqi intervention and thus ensured Hussein's survival during the kingdom's worst internal crisis. Notably, the operation blended domestic and international tactics: a local counter-insurgency was won using espionage and psychological warfare on a foreign army.

==== Thwarting Syrian subversion – 1981 ====
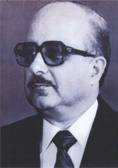
Mudar Badran portrait in 1960

In the early 1980s, Jordan's GID faced a serious security challenge from neighboring Syria, amid bitter regional rivalries. Tensions peaked in 1981 when Jordanian intelligence uncovered a Syrian-backed plot to assassinate Prime Minister Mudar Badran in Amman. Around the same time, a top Jordanian diplomat was kidnapped in Beirut, and Syria was blamed for that as well. King Hussein's government accused Syrian President Hafez al-Assad of waging "sabotage and subversion" to destabilize Jordan from within. In response, the GID intensified internal security measures – increasing surveillance and foiling infiltrators – to protect Jordan's leadership and vital installations. Crucially, Jordan also struck back on the intelligence front: Hussein's mukhabarat covertly harbored Syrian Muslim Brotherhood dissidents who opposed Assad. By giving refuge and support to Assad's underground opponents, the GID was effectively engaging Syria in a shadow war of espionage and proxy forces. The foiling of the assassination attempt on Badran was a major success for the GID, denying Damascus a chance to decapitate Jordan's government. It demonstrated that even as Syria tried "terrorist drive" tactics to weaken King Hussein, Jordan's intelligence could thwart foreign plots on its soil. This episode highlighted how domestic security operations in Jordan were deeply intertwined with regional politics – the GID had to counter external aggression (Assad's covert campaign) while maintaining internal stability, underlining its dual domestic-and-international mandate in protecting the kingdom.

==== Foiling assassination attempt on King Hussein – 1984 and 1993 ====
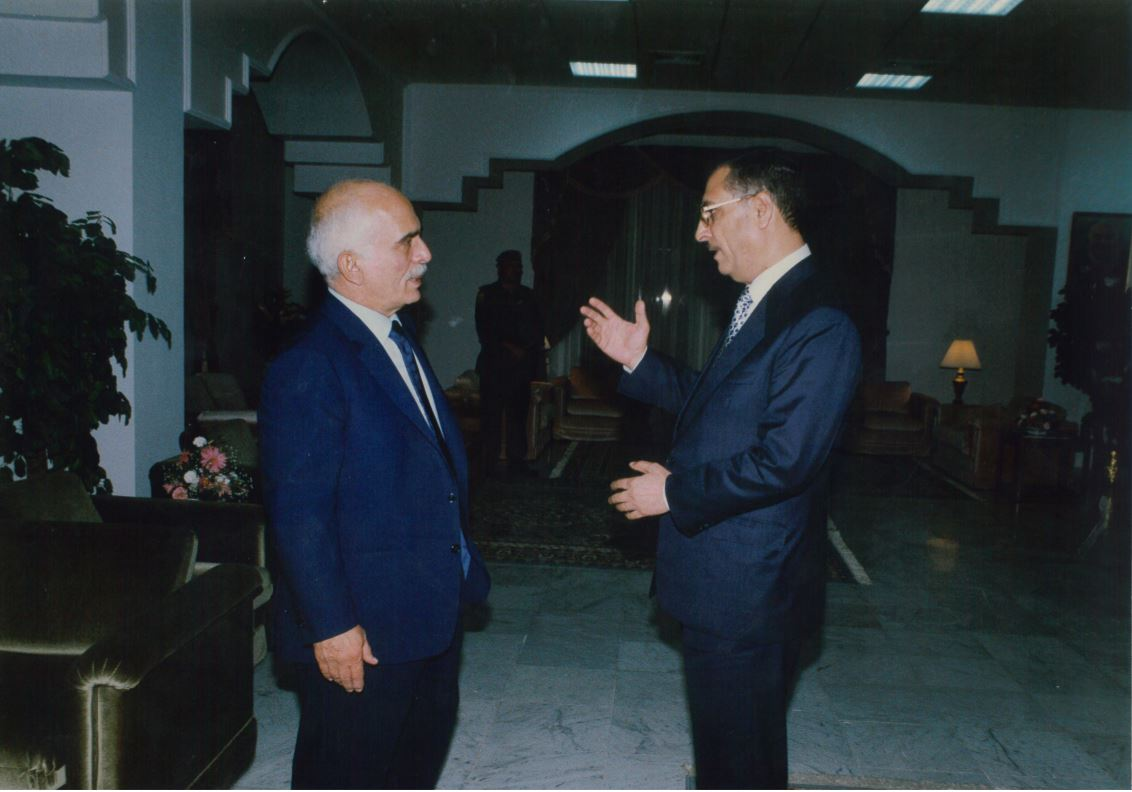
Mustafa Al-Qaisi speaks with King Hussein of Jordan.

There were ongoing threats faced by King Hussein. He was subjected to 18 assassination attempts. Most of them were rescued by members of the intelligence service. In 1984, Jordan witnessed one of the most serious assassination attempts targeting King Hussein bin Talal, amid rising regional tensions and increased activity from groups opposed to the regime, both within and outside the kingdom. The Jordanian General Intelligence Directorate (GID), led at the time by Mustafa al-Qaisi, uncovered the details of a dangerous plot that aimed to assassinate the king during one of his domestic tours. Intelligence service was able to accurately identify the conspirators and their locations. A series of preemptive arrests was carried out, successfully thwarting the attack very shortly before it could be executed. Following this incident, Mustafa Al-Qaisi gained increasing royal trust and was later appointed as the Director of the General Intelligence Directorate from 1991 to 1996. Also, a notable incident occurred in 1993 when Jordanian security forces uncovered a plot to assassinate King Hussein during a June graduation ceremony at a military academy. The plan involved six military cadets and four senior members of an Islamic fundamentalist group. The government announced that the plot was thwarted in April of that year.

==== Bay'at al-Imam – Mid-1990s ====
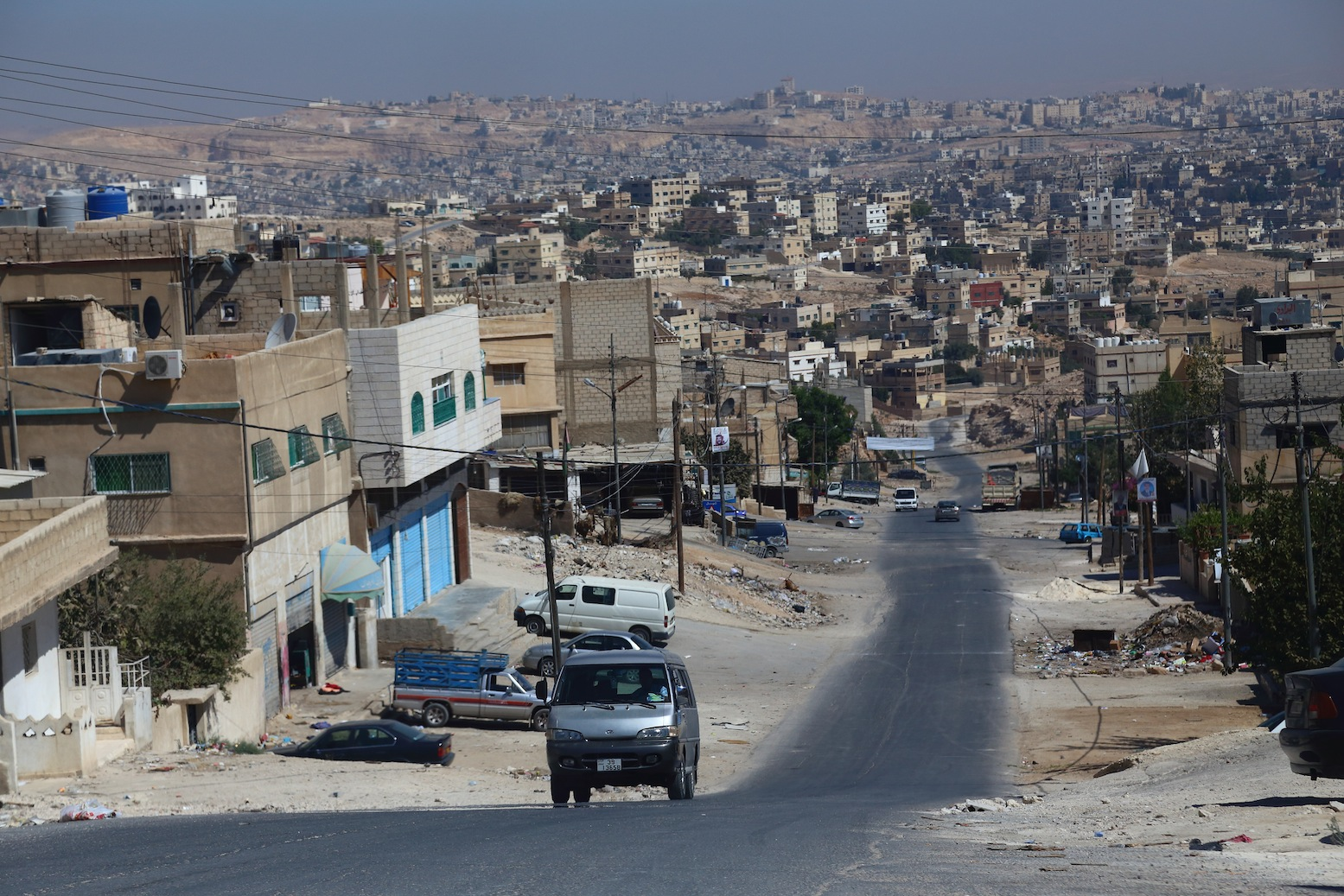
Az-Zarqa, Jordan, where Bay'at al-Imam network was founded

During the 1990s, the GID increasingly turned its attention to Islamist terrorism at home, as Jordan faced a spillover of militant jihadist ideology from regional conflicts. A pivotal operation in this realm was the dismantling of the Bay'at al-Imam network (1993–1999), an underground jihadist group led by ideologues Abu Muhammad al-Maqdisi and Abu Musab al-Zarqawi. Formed in 1993 by veterans of the 1980s Afghanistan war, this group of extremists plotted to overthrow the Jordanian monarchy and establish an Islamist regime, even planning attacks on public theaters and officials. The cell moved from rhetoric to violence: in 1994, members of Bay'at al-Imam assassinated a French diplomat in Amman (shooting him in his driveway) as part of their campaign against the government and its Western allies. Jordan's intelligence agents had been monitoring the group from its inception; by the mid-90s the GID conducted raids to seize weapons and explosives and arrest the core members before they could carry out wider terror attacks. In 1996–97, dozens of militants were prosecuted by Jordan's State Security Court – 10 were convicted in 1997 on charges ranging from bomb plotting to murder (two received life sentences for the French diplomat's killing). Zarqawi himself was jailed during this crackdown (initially sentenced to 15 years, later amnestied), years before he became notorious as an Al-Qaeda leader in Iraq. The takedown of Bay'at al-Imam demonstrated the GID's effectiveness in preempting domestic terrorist plots and its no-nonsense approach to internal security. Strategically, this operation also had an international dimension: Jordan's actions against the cell were closely watched by Al-Qaeda's leadership, which reportedly followed the trial of Zarqawi and his associates with great interest. This underscored that local counterterrorism efforts in Jordan resonated globally – the GID was not only protecting Jordanians, but also indirectly shaping the early battle against a transnational jihadist movement. The former (CIA) analyst Nada Bakos, wrote about this in her book The Targeter (2019).

==== Mossad assassination in Amman – 1997 ====
A dramatic example of the GID's international reach came in September 1997, when Jordan's intelligence service confronted an operation by Israel's Mossad on Jordanian soil. On September 25, two Mossad agents, disguised as Canadian tourists, attempted to assassinate Hamas leader Khaled Mashal in Amman by surreptitiously injecting a fast-acting toxin into his ear. The attack did not go as planned – Mashal's alert bodyguard and nearby Jordanian security officers chased down and captured the assailants within minutes, foiling the murder attempt. Khaled Mashal was rushed to a hospital, gravely ill from the poison. Enraged at this breach of Jordan's sovereignty (especially since Jordan had signed a peace treaty with Israel in 1994), King Hussein – strongly supported by the GID's handling of the captured Israelis and evidence – issued an ultimatum: hand over the antidote or face dire consequences. He threatened to sever relations and put the Mossad agents on trial for attempted murder, which could lead to their execution if Mashal died. An intense diplomatic crisis ensued, drawing in U.S. President Bill Clinton as mediator. Ultimately, Israel's prime minister, Benjamin Netanyahu, was forced to capitulate: Israel dispatched the antidote that saved Mashal's life and, in a stunning concession, released the jailed Hamas spiritual leader Sheikh Ahmed Yassin in exchange for the return of its agents. The GID's role in this episode was central.

==== Foiling terrorist bombings and smuggling attempts – 1998 ====
Although no major attacks occurred in Jordan in 1998, the Kingdom experienced a series of limited security incidents resulting from regional tensions and a surge in the activities of small local extremist cells. That year, a group known as the "Reform and Challenge Movement" emerged as a small radical Islamist organization that carried out a series of rudimentary bombings in Amman between March and May 1998, targeting security facilities, public infrastructure, a foreign school, and a major hotel. Fortunately, the damage caused by these attacks was limited to minor material losses without any casualties, but the security forces maintained a high state of alert and focused closely on internal extremist activities. The General Intelligence Directorate (GID) intensified efforts to track down the members of this movement and successfully thwarted additional plots before they could be executed. Simultaneously, authorities tightened border security to prevent the smuggling of weapons and explosives through Jordan, particularly to block their delivery to militant groups in the West Bank. Indeed, Jordanian forces intercepted several arms shipments throughout 1998, and smugglers were referred to the judiciary. In September of the same year, the State Security Court sentenced two Jordanian defendants to 15 years of hard labor after they were apprehended in possession of explosives and accused of plotting attacks either inside Palestinian territories or Israel. Additionally, in October, a case involving a six-member cell charged with possessing and selling explosives to support terrorist activities was referred to court. These proactive operations led to the dismantling of the local extremist network and averted potential threats before they could escalate, allowing Jordan to maintain its record of being free from major attacks that year.

==== Millennium plot – 1999 ====
At the end of 1999, Jordanian intelligence uncovered a major Al-Qaeda plot targeting tourist sites in Jordan, coinciding with the new millennium celebrations. On November 30, 1999, the intelligence intercepted a phone call between Abu Zubaydah (a senior Al-Qaeda leader) and one of his operatives in Amman containing a coded message stating "training time is over," signaling the imminent attack. Following this, security forces launched arrests on December 12, 1999, capturing 16 suspects. This action prevented planned bombings at multiple locations, including the Radisson Hotels and Mount Nebo. Twenty-eight defendants were brought to trial, 22 were convicted, and six were sentenced to death (including the plotters linked to Osama bin Laden). Information was shared with the United States to help thwart parallel plots on its soil at the same time.

==== Dismantling an Al-Qaeda cell after the assassination of a diplomat – 2002 ====
With the global rise of al-Qaeda's threat following 2001, the organization targeted Jordan on several occasions. One of the most serious incidents occurred on October 28, 2002, when gunmen affiliated with al-Qaeda assassinated American diplomat Laurence Foley (an employee of the USAID) outside his home in Amman—the first such operation on Jordanian soil. The General Intelligence Directorate (GID) quickly uncovered the perpetrators before they could execute additional attacks. Thanks to intensive intelligence efforts and meticulous tracking of leads related to the crime, authorities arrested the principal perpetrators within weeks. In December 2002, two individuals involved in the assassination—a Libyan national and a Jordanian citizen—were apprehended and confessed to the details of the operation. Investigations revealed that the accused had received instructions and funding from the then-leader of al-Qaeda in Iraq, Abu Musab al-Zarqawi, in exchange for carrying out the assassination. The suspects were charged with murder and referred to the State Security Court remaining in detention pending trial, and were subsequently convicted and executed in 2004. The dismantling of this cell and the swift elimination of those involved sent a clear message from Jordan to terrorist elements. The intelligence services succeeded in neutralizing an al-Qaeda-affiliated network on Jordanian territory in record time, preventing the execution of further plots that could have targeted Jordanian or foreign interests. This successful operation helped maintain Jordan's international standing by safeguarding diplomats on its soil and further strengthened security cooperation with the United States in the broader war on terror.

==== Foiling the 2004 chemical bomb plot ====
In April 2004, Jordanian authorities announced that they had foiled an unprecedented terrorist plot involving an attempt to carry out the first chemical attack by Al-Qaeda. Jordan TV at the time aired confessions from a cell led by Azmi Al-Jayousi, who had received his orders from the Jordanian Abu Musab Al-Zarqawi (then the leader of Al-Qaeda in Iraq). The plot aimed to blow up the headquarters of the Jordanian General Intelligence Directorate itself, in addition to the Prime Ministry building and the U.S. Embassy in Amman using trucks loaded with highly toxic chemical substances. Investigations revealed that members of the cell had purchased 20 tons of chemical materials, and Jordanian experts claimed that the successful detonation could have released a toxic cloud potentially affecting around 160,000 people. Research sources described the plot as one that would have been a "massive" terrorist attack if carried out, but the Jordanian intelligence succeeded in completely foiling it by arresting the cell members and confiscating the explosives. The operation received wide acclaim due to its scale and was considered "the most dangerous" among the thwarted plots.

==== Amman bombings – 2005 ====
On November 9, 2005, the city of Amman was rocked by a series of coordinated bombings that struck three of its major hotels: the Radisson SAS, the Hyatt Amman, and the Days Inn. The attacks resulted in the deaths of sixty people and injured more than one hundred innocent civilians. Responsibility was claimed by Al-Qaeda in Iraq, sending a message of fire and terror intended to destabilize the kingdom and threaten its leadership. Despite the General Intelligence Directorate's long record of foiling plots before their execution, this heinous attack revealed vulnerabilities through which danger was able to infiltrate undetected. The Amman bombings marked a pivotal moment in the history of Jordanian intelligence operations. In response, the GID embarked on a comprehensive overhaul of the national security apparatus. New doors of cooperation were opened widely with major international agencies, and efforts in surveillance and pursuit operations were significantly intensified. These measures contributed substantially to enhancing Jordan's capabilities in confronting terrorism.

==== Foiling plots by ISIS ====
With the rise of the ISIS in the past decade, Jordanian intelligence intensified its efforts to track affiliated cells. In March 2016, security forces carried out a major raid in the city of Irbid in northern Jordan, during which they clashed with an ISIS cell planning attacks on civilians and military personnel. The operation ended with the killing of 7 terrorists and the foiling of the intended attacks, despite the martyrdom of one officer and injuries to others on the Jordanian side. In 2018, the intelligence agency announced the thwarting of a major ISIS plot involving plans to carry out a series of bombings targeting security centers, shopping malls, and moderate religious figures inside Jordan. All members of the cell were arrested before they could execute their plans.

==== Al-Baqa'a attack – 2016 ====
On June 6, 2016, at 4:00 GMT, on the first day of the month of Ramadan, three GID officers were killed in an attack in the refugee camp located outside of Amman. The suspect was identified as Mahmoud Masharfeh. According to Al Jazeera, Masharfeh had been imprisoned between 2012 and 2014 for attempting to enter Gaza and join a group fighting Hamas. A source who was close to the suspect while he was in prison claims that Masharfeh has been trying to join ISIL and it is unknown whether he was able to. Soon after the attack Masharfeh was arrested.

==== 2021 arrests ====
The Jordanian Intelligence played a proactive and highly effective preventive role in thwarting the 2021 attempt to destabilize the monarchy. From an early stage, the GID closely monitored unusual movements and communications. They detected ongoing contact between Prince Hamzah bin Hussein and both domestic and foreign figures. These interactions, along with suspicious political and social activities, raised concerns about potential incitement and subversive intentions aimed at undermining the state. In response, the agency utilized advanced surveillance and interception technologies, collecting audio recordings, video footage, and documentation of covert meetings. This body of evidence proved sufficient to demonstrate the existence of a coordinated plot that threatened national security and stability. Once the intelligence picture was complete, the GID, in collaboration with other security entities, executed a precise operation on April 3, 2021. All involved parties were arrested simultaneously, a measure that effectively prevented the situation from escalating into public disorder or street-level mobilization.

The agency acted with institutional restraint, ensuring that the crisis did not spill into the public sphere in a way that would provoke panic or confusion. Notably, communication networks remained intact, no state of emergency was declared, and the matter was managed with relative discretion and institutional prudence, supported by controlled media coverage. Ultimately, the GID submitted its full dossier of evidence to the State Security Court, which facilitated the sentencing of Bassem Awadallah and Sharif Hassan bin Zaid to fifteen years in prison. Meanwhile, Prince Hamzah's case was handled internally within the royal family framework, based on the recommendations of King Abdullah II.

==== Foiling plots in 2025 ====
On April 15, 2025, the Jordanian General Intelligence Directorate announced the foiling of a series of terrorist plots aimed at destabilizing national security and inciting chaos within the Kingdom. Sixteen individuals involved were arrested following meticulous intelligence surveillance that began in 2021. The plots included the manufacturing of locally made and imported rockets, the development of drones, and the possession of highly dangerous explosives such as TNT and C4, which were stored in fortified warehouses in Amman and Zarqa. Investigations also revealed that some suspects had received training abroad and had connections to banned groups. The cases were referred to the State Security Court, and the Jordanian government announced that video confessions of the suspects would be broadcast, along with footage of the seized weapons and equipment, in order to inform the public of the gravity of these plots.

==== Other notable operations ====
The operations conducted by the GID are characterized by a high degree of secrecy and confidentiality. Most missions and intelligence activities are shrouded in secrecy, with details withheld from the public to safeguard national security. Only select exceptional operations are announced—those that serve strategic purposes such as sending deterrent messages or reinforcing public confidence—without compromising the higher interests of the state. In November 2019, Al-Rai revealed that Jordanian intelligence had foiled a plot by two extremists who were planning to target American and Israeli diplomats as well as U.S. forces stationed at a base in the south of the country. The planned method was to use booby-trapped vehicles to storm the site, followed by an attack using firearms and sharp weapons. The two suspects were referred to the State Security Court. Jordanian intelligence also thwarted several infiltration and arms smuggling attempts from the Syrian and Iraqi borders in 2020 and beyond, some of which aimed to deliver weapons or explosives to sleeper cells inside the Kingdom. Official statistics indicate that in 2018 alone, Jordanian intelligence thwarted 94 terrorist operations—62 of them outside Jordan and 32 within the Kingdom—reflecting the extensive preemptive effort undertaken. One researcher wrote that the significance of these achievements became clear when one "can only imagine the chaos that would have resulted on both the global and local levels had just a few of these operations been carried out."

== Leadership ==
The first director of the GID is Mohammad Rasoul Al-Kailani in 1964 and the current director is General Ahmad Husni. On January 2, 2009, King Abdullah II replaced Muhammad Dahabi (brother of Nader Dahabi) as director with General Muhammad Raqqad, the former GID director. In 2012, Muhammad Dahabi was sentenced to 13 years imprisonment.

=== Directors ===
No.	Portrait	Director of Jordanian General Intelligence	Took office	Left office	Time in office	Ref.
1	Mohammad Rasoul Al–Kailani	Brigadier General; Mohammad Rasoul Al–Kailani (1933–2003); Founder and First Director of Jordanian Intelligence	1964	1968	3–4	
2	Mudar Badran	Major General; Mudar Badran (1934–2023)	1968	1970	1–2	
3	Natheer Rshaid	Brigadier General; Natheer Rshaid (1929–2024)	1970	1974	3–4	
4	Ahmad Obeidat	Lieutenant General; Ahmad Obeidat (born 1938); The Longest-Serving Intelligence Director	1974	1982	7–8	
5	Tariq Alaa El-Din	Brigadier General; Tariq Alaa El-Din (1935–2024)	1982	1989	6–7	
6	Mustafa al-Qaisi	Major General; Mustafa al-Qaisi (1938–2019)	1989	1996	6–7	
7	Sameeh Al-Bateekhi	Lieutenant General; Sameeh Al-Bateekhi (born 1943); He received a 4-year prison sentence in 2003.	1996	2000	3–4	
8	Sa'ad Khair	Marshal; Sa'ad Khair (1956–2009); The only director of Jordanian intelligence to have achieved the rank of field marshal, and he is one of the five who hold this rank in Jordan.	November 2000	May 6, 2005	4–5	
9	Samih Asfoura	Major General; Samih Asfoura; The Shortest Term for a Director of Intelligence	May 6, 2005	December 20, 2005	228 days	
10	Mohammad Al-Dhahabi	Brigadier General; Mohammad Al-Dhahabi; He received a 13-year prison sentence in 2012 and was released in late 2023.	December 20, 2005	December 29, 2008	3 years, 9 days	
11	Mohammad Al-Raqqad	Brigadier General; Mohammad Al-Raqqad (1965–2020)	December 30, 2008	October 17, 2011	2 years, 291 days	
12	Faisal Al-Shoubaki	General; Faisal Al-Shoubaki (1952–2020)	October 17, 2011	March 30, 2017	5 years, 164 days	
13	Adnan Al-Jundi	Lieutenant General; Adnan Al-Jundi	March 30, 2017	May 1, 2019	2 years, 32 days	
14	Ahmad Husni Hatoqai	Brigadier General; Ahmad Husni Hatoqai	May 1, 2019	Incumbent	7 years, 199 days	

== Cooperation and global impact ==
Despite some human rights criticisms, the Jordanian intelligence agency has received widespread praise from international circles. On November 11, 2005, Ken Silverstein wrote in the Los Angeles Times that "Western governments and commentators never cease to praise the Jordanian intelligence corps for its tremendous success in preventing terrorist operations." Frank Anderson, the former head of the CIA's Middle East division, also said that "members of the Jordanian General Intelligence are highly skilled interrogators." Former U.S. officials have noted that many senior Jordanian intelligence personnel received training from the CIA. This enabled Jordan, despite its small size, to build an intelligence agency capable of achieving victories. The Jordanian intelligence adopted a philosophy of cooperative security. GID recognised that terrorism is a global threat that requires collective confrontation.

According to the memoirs of Adnan Abu Odeh (a Jordanian politician and former Chief of the Royal Hashemite Court), Jordanian intelligence cooperated with the Soviet intelligence agency during the early 1970s for the purpose of identifying important positions of Israeli forces deployed along the Jordanian–Palestinian border. This was done via a reconnaissance satellite belonging to the Soviet Union. In 1997, relations between the Jordanian intelligence and Mossad were severely strained following a failed Mossad attempt to assassinate Hamas leader Khaled Mashal in the capital, Amman.

The United Kingdom has supported the development of Jordan's intelligence services since the 1950s and later participated in training many Jordanian officers. Some reports show that MI6 considers Jordanian intelligence a key partner in the Middle East, especially in intelligence sharing on transnational terrorist groups. Western documents indicated that Amman became a hub for regional intelligence coordination efforts involving the UK, especially during the Syrian crisis and the rise of ISIS. The mutual interest of Jordan and Britain in containing extremist threats and maintaining regional stability solidified this partnership. Although the nature of the relationship remains largely confidential, the outcomes—such as foiled terrorist plots in Europe based on intelligence from Amman—demonstrate its strength. On the American side, the CIA heavily relied on its Jordanian counterpart, especially in the fight against radical Islamic movements. Up to 100 Al-Qaeda prisoners passed through the GID's Jafr prison in the southern desert, including some of the most high-profile captures in the war on terror, such as Al-Qaeda operations chief Khalid Sheikh Mohammed and Gulf leader Abd al-Rahim al-Nashiri. This reliance partly stemmed from the shared aversion of both countries to Islamic radicalism. It is believed that their cooperation helped suppress the Al-Qaeda insurgency in Iraq and eliminate terrorist masterminds like Abu Musab Al-Zarqawi.

Jordan deployed field intelligence officers alongside U.S. forces in conflict zones such as Afghanistan and Iraq to provide on-the-ground intelligence support. Jordan paid a heavy price for this involvement; in December 2009, Al-Qaeda targeted a U.S. base in Khost, Afghanistan with a suicide bombing that killed 7 CIA agents and a Jordanian intelligence officer, Captain Sharif Ali bin Zeid. The Jordanian officer was part of a joint team tracking Al-Qaeda leaders when the explosion occurred. Amman continued to dispatch elite officers to combat zones to share field expertise, particularly after 2014 with the formation of the international coalition against ISIS in Syria and Iraq. Jordanian agents carried out intelligence tasks such as infiltrating terrorist networks and supplying coalition forces with vital information on enemy movements. A 2017 media report revealed that Jordanian field agents successfully infiltrated ISIS itself and acquired intelligence about plots such as a hidden bomb in an aircraft, which they later passed to Western agencies to neutralize the threat. These human capabilities have made Jordan, in the eyes of the Americans, "the most important partner in human intelligence" within the international coalition.

Jamie Smith, a former officer in the Central Intelligence Agency, describes the Jordanian intelligence agency as possessing exceptional expertise in dismantling extremist networks and interrogating detainees, thanks to its deep understanding of radical organizations' culture and sectarian dynamics in the region. Smith, in his praise of Jordanian capabilities, stated: "They know the terrorist's culture, his environment, and his network better than anyone else... and they have unmatched expertise regarding extremist groups and both Sunni and Shia cultures." As a result of this superiority, the CIA relied on Jordanian intelligence for the most difficult missions, to the extent that Charles Sam Faddis (a former head of the CIA's counterterrorism unit) considered the partnership with Jordanian intelligence to be "the model against which all other partnerships are measured."

A report by Foreign Policy magazine described the Jordanian intelligence agency as "the most capable in the region after its Israeli counterpart" and one of the closest intelligence partners of the United States Arab and international figures have praised the competence of Jordanian intelligence. Following the foiling of the massive 2004 plot, global newspapers described the agency as "the first line of defense" against Al-Qaeda in the region. A Western security official also stated that "what the Jordanians accomplished in dismantling that plot saved thousands of lives." In the context of the war against ISIS, Al Jazeera reported that John Kiriakou (a former CIA officer) questioned Israel's ability to infiltrate ISIS compared to Jordan's success in doing so—an implicit reference to the superiority of Jordanian intelligence in the domain of human intelligence within terrorist organizations.

The Washington Institute for Near East Policy pointed out that "Jordanian intelligence has repeatedly demonstrated its superior competence and high professionalism in foiling terrorist plots and dismantling networks that threaten the Kingdom's security." In a 2012 study by the RAND Corporation stated that it was confirmed Jordan "has long been a target of Middle Eastern terrorism, but it has proven a strong deterrent force through its security services, thwarting plots before they materialize."

== Human rights issues ==
Human rights reports have criticized the harshness of some of the interrogation methods used by the GID, methods implemented as the result of external requests and pressure during the post-9/11 era. However, most Western countries turned a blind eye to these criticisms in the context of the war on terror, given the valuable intelligence Jordan provides. In 1995, the United Nations Committee Against Torture called on the Jordanian government to establish independent oversight over detainees held by the General Intelligence Directorate. Human Rights Watch stated that between June 2003 and December 2004, and through several visits to intelligence centers and prisons, the organization documented multiple human rights violations committed by the Directorate.

== See also ==
- Jordanian Armed Forces
- Chairman of the Joint Chiefs of Staff (Jordan)
