= Fat'hi Abu Taleb =

Jordanian general (1933-2016)

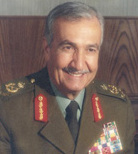
- Born: 1933; Wadi Sir, Amman, Jordan
- Died: 3 November 2016 (aged 82–83); Amman, Jordan

Field Marshal Fat'hi Abu Taleb (1933 – 3 November 2016) was a Jordanian army general who was the Chairman of the Joint Chiefs of Staff in the Jordanian military. He rose to become one of the most influential military men in Jordanian history. In addition to being a field marshal, he was also served as the head of the General Intelligence Directorate (GID), as well as the military attaché at Jordan's embassy in the United States from 1971 to 1974.

He was a close adviser to king Abdullah II.

== Education ==
Abu Taleb graduated from the Royal Military Academy in 1954. He received a military science degree from the Defence Services Staff College in India in 1966. He received a master's degree in military science from the University of Mutah, and a second master's in military science in the United Kingdom.

== Upper House of Parliament ==
Abu Taleb was a member in the upper house of the Parliament of Jordan, in the twentieth, twenty-first and twenty-second senates. His service there ended with the dissolution of the twenty-second senate on 25 November 2010.

== See also ==
- Jordanian Armed Forces
