= Ahmad Hatoqay =

Ahmad Husni
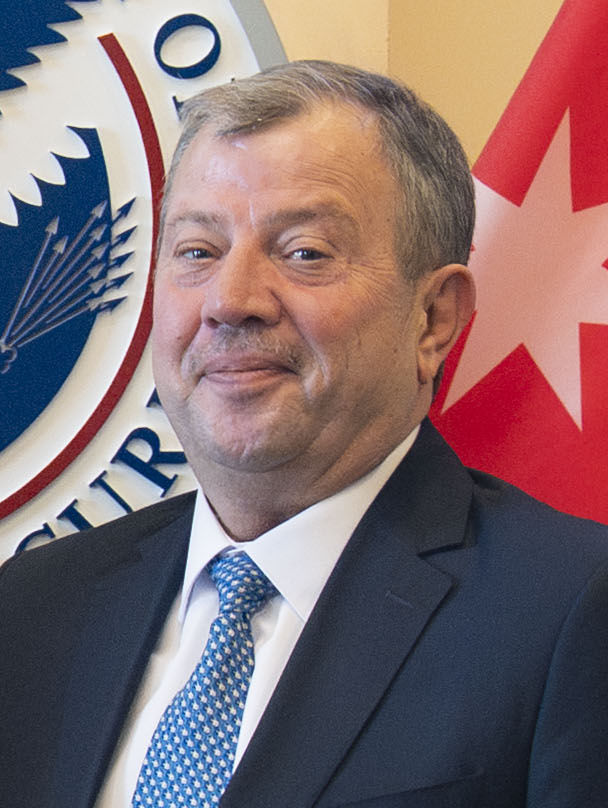
- Born: Ahmad Husni Hassan Hatoqay; Amman, Jordan
- Occupation: Intelligence officer
- Known for: Director of Jordan's General Intelligence Department (2019–present)

Ahmad Husni Hatoqay (Arabic: أحمد حسني حتقاي, romanized: Ahmad Husni Hatoqay; Adyghe: Хьатыкъуай Ахьмэт Хьусни) is a Jordanian intelligence officer who has served as Director of the General Intelligence Department (GID) since 1 May 2019. He succeeded Adnan al-Jundi in the position and holds the rank of major general. The director of the GID reports directly to King Abdullah II.

During his tenure, the GID has been involved in several security and intelligence matters in Jordan, including the 2021 political crisis involving Prince Hamzah bin Hussein, operations related to cross-border drug smuggling from Syria, and Jordan's security and diplomatic concerns following the fall of the Assad regime in December 2024.

== Background ==
Biographical information about Husni is limited. His exact date of birth has not been publicly reported. He is of Hatuqay origin. Jordanian press accounts describe him as being of Circassian descent and as coming from a family with a background in the kingdom's security services. One Jordanian outlet reported that his late father had also served in the General Intelligence Department (GID).

== Career ==
=== Rise through the GID ===
Husni spent about three decades working within the General Intelligence Department (GID) before becoming its director. Jordanian and international media reports state that he served as director of the GID's Counterterrorism Bureau and later as director of its Directorate of Foreign Affairs. He subsequently served as director of intelligence for Amman, a position he reportedly held for about five years, before becoming assistant director of the GID for regional affairs. He was appointed deputy director of the GID in 2017.

=== Appointment as director of the GID ===
On 1 May 2019, King Abdullah II appointed Husni as Director of the General Intelligence Department, succeeding Lieutenant General Adnan Jundi, who had held the position since March 2017. A separate royal decree promoted Husni from brigadier general to major general, effective on the same date. In a letter issued with the appointment, the King described the GID as facing an "intricate phase" amid regional instability and called for continued modernization of the agency and the development of its personnel and professional standards. He also thanked Jundi for his service.

Regional media reported that Husni's appointment formed part of a wider change in the GID's senior leadership. Some reports also attributed his selection to his close relationship with the King.

=== Security policy and regional diplomacy ===
Since 2019, Husni has made a number of public statements about the role of the General Intelligence Department in Jordan's political and security affairs. He expressed support for the Royal Commission for the Modernization of the Political System and said that the GID supported the development of political parties in Jordan.

During his tenure, the GID has also been involved in efforts to combat drug and arms trafficking along Jordan's border with Syria including Captagon. Husni has publicly discussed contacts between Jordanian and Syrian intelligence officials. In 2021, he described the restoration of intelligence contacts with the Syrian government as a "fait accompli" amid changes in regional relations.

Following the fall of Bashar al-Assad's government in December 2024, Husni continued to participate in regional discussions concerning Syria. In October 2025, he accompanied Deputy Prime Minister and Foreign Minister Ayman Safadi and Chairman of the Joint Chiefs of Staff Major General Yousef Huneiti in meetings with Turkish officials such as Foreign Minister Hakan Fidan and intelligence chief İbrahim Kalın. The talks took place ahead of a Jordan-hosted meeting of Syria's neighboring countries and addressed counter-terrorism, drug trafficking and arms trafficking. King Abdullah has also described the GID as continuing a process of "development and modernisation" during Husni's tenure.
