= Mustafa al-Qaisi =

Jordanian politician and former head of the General Intelligence Directorate

Mustafa al-Queisi
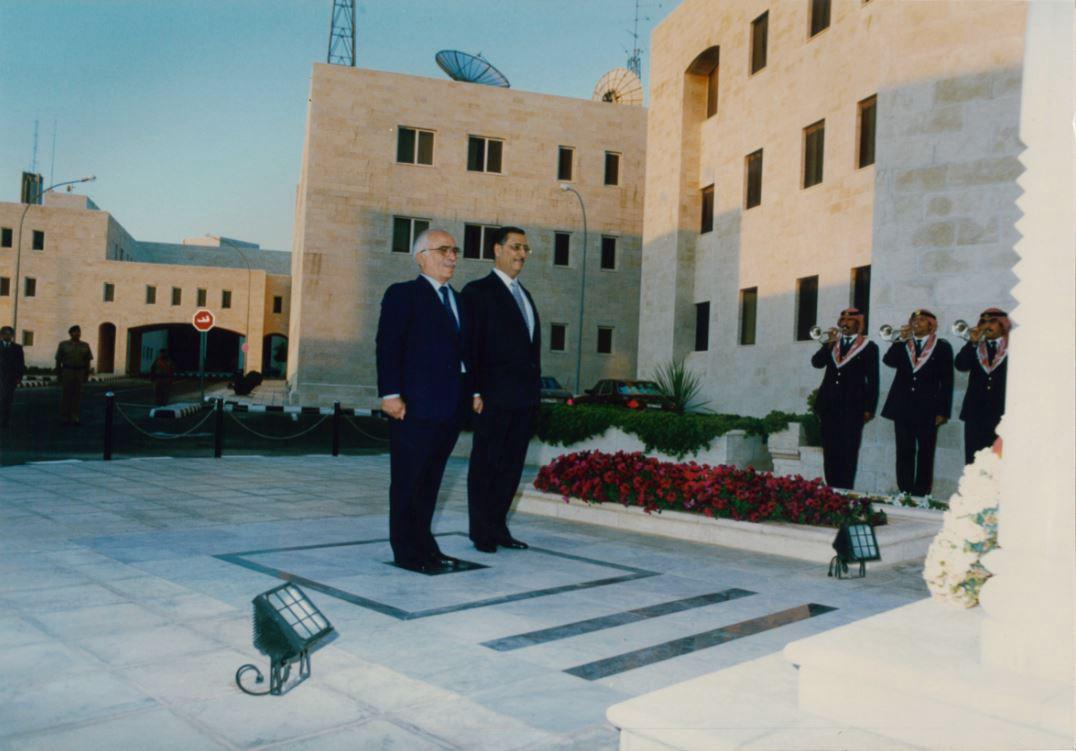
- Mustafa Queisi with King Hussien
- Office: Director of the General Intelligence Department
- Term: 1989–1996
- Predecessor: Tariq Ala' al-Din
- Successor: Samih al-Batrikhi

Mustafa Queisi (also spelled Mustafa Al-Queisi; 10 October 1937 – 1 December 2019) was a politician and an intelligence officer from Jordan who served as the Director of the General Intelligence Directorate between 1989 and 1996, which is the highest security position in Jordan. He is considered one of the most prominent figures during the era of the late King Hussein bin Talal. After his passing, the newspaper "Rai al-Youm" described him as a legend of security and national work. During his tenure, he oversaw security operations amidst regional and local political transformations, including the Gulf War and political reforms in Jordan. He began his professional career in the Public Security Directorate before moving to intelligence work, where he first served in the Public Security Directorate, then joined the General Intelligence Directorate and rose through its ranks until he became its director. His leadership period coincided with notable regional events such as the Palestinian-Israeli peace process and the economic changes that Jordan witnessed.

After leaving the intelligence directorate, Queisi held several governmental positions, including Minister of State for Prime Ministry Affairs in the early 2000s. His security experience formed an influential background in his participation in issues of national security and policies. He also remained active in political life through his membership in the Senate.

== Life ==
He was born in Dhiban District in Madaba Governorate on October 10, 1937. After graduating from Al-Hussein College in Amman, he joined the Royal Police College, then worked as an officer in the Public Security, from which he joined the General Intelligence Directorate and worked as an officer, rising through the leadership positions until he obtained the rank of First Lieutenant General.

He took over the administration of the Jordanian General Intelligence between 1989 and 1996, which is considered one of the most sensitive stages in the modern political history of Jordan, due to the internal political, social, economic, and security events it witnessed, as well as political transformations in the region that coincided with the Second Gulf War.

As part of the appreciation for his pivotal role and contributions during that period, King Hussein chose him, on February 4, 1996, to be his advisor and rapporteur for the State Security Council with the rank of minister, which is one of the sensitive positions in both the security and political dimensions at the advisory level.

In 2001, Queisi was appointed a member of the Nineteenth Jordanian Senate in 2001, which is the council that plays a legislative advisory role at the national level, as it includes an elite group of political men and national figures, to be called the "King's Council."

In Ali Abu al-Ragheb's first government, Queisi was chosen to enter the government formation as Minister of State for Prime Ministry Affairs between 2002 and 2003, noting that he and the former intelligence director Nadhir Rashid were the only two intelligence directors who held a ministerial position in Jordanian governments in the last years of the reign of the late King Hussein bin Talal and throughout the years of King Abdullah II's rule.

During his tenure as Minister of State for Prime Ministry Affairs, Queisi oversaw important files during that period, the most prominent of which was the file of banking facilities and many files related to national security and the fight against corruption, as First Lieutenant General Queisi was known for his distinguished abilities, professionalism, honesty, and courage.

== Security and political career ==
Queisi emerged since the early days of his work as an officer in the General Intelligence, and his name had a presence in many stations and events that Jordan witnessed at the security and political levels, which made his name known and circulated among the political elites and national figures during important periods that Jordan lived.

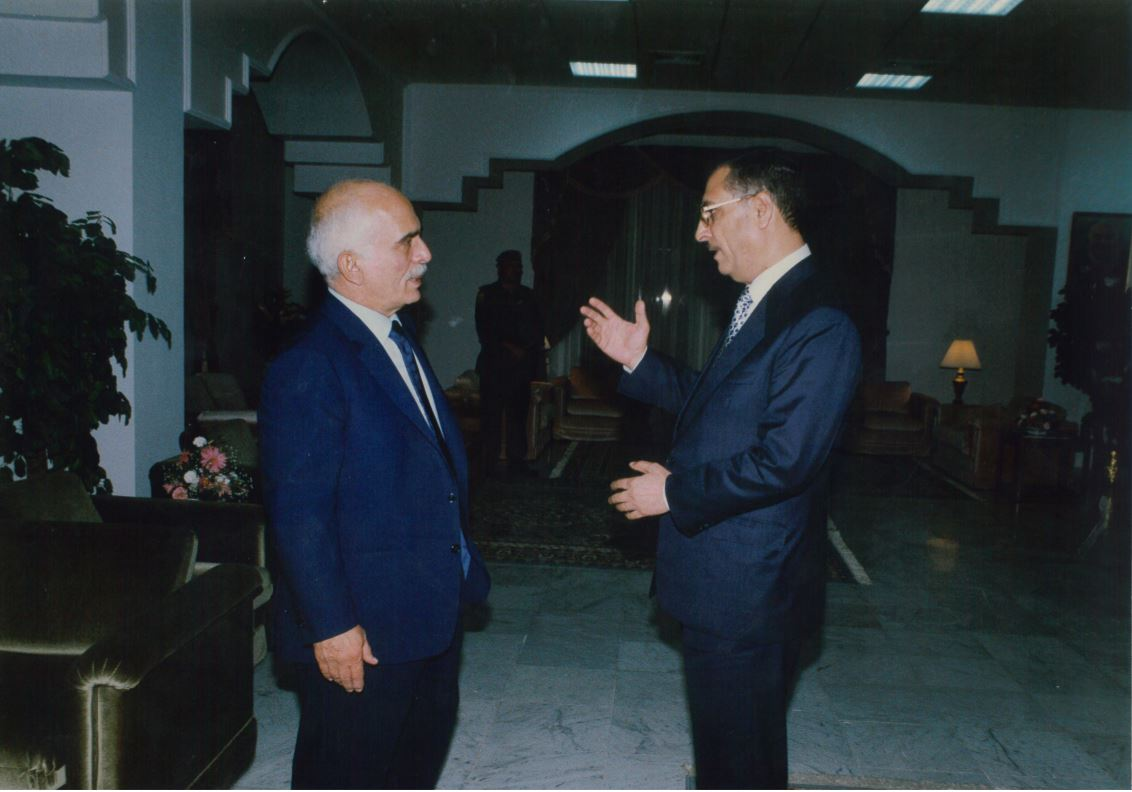
Mustafa Queisi with King Hussein

Security-wise, Queisi's name was associated with historical events that established him in the memory of Jordanians, especially in the early 1970s, during which Jordan and Jordanians lived through unfortunate security events, especially with the emergence of his role during the third government of the martyred Prime Minister Wasfi al-Tal, which was formed in October 1970 until Tal's assassination in Cairo on November 28, 1971.

Queisi was known during that exceptional period in the history of the Kingdom for its existential threat, as he rode the wave of danger that controlled the country at the time, to cut the road leading to the late Tal's house in the Kamalia area in Sweileh, to inform him of the security and political developments, in a great national mission entrusted to Queisi, who was still at the time a rising officer with the rank of "major" in the Jordanian intelligence apparatus.

The rise of Queisi's star, the brilliant officer as many of Jordan's men describe him, did not stop at that stage, but he became more present in pivotal events in which he led security crisis cells, which thwarted plans targeting the national security of Jordan, which proves the security astuteness and cleverness for which Queisi was known.

In this context, Queisi is credited with thwarting the attempted bombing of the Prime Ministry during the government of the late Prime Minister Ahmad al-Lawzi, as Queisi was the leader of the security cell that foiled the terrorist plot, and as a result, the planner "Abu Daoud" and his group were arrested by the General Intelligence Directorate. Queisi and his colleague at the time, and later General Marwan Qataishat, led an important security and intelligence role in thwarting the attempt to bomb the late King Hussein's plane in 1977.

On the political level, the stage in which Queisi held the position of Director of the General Intelligence carried pivotal political stations and events in the modern history of Jordan and others at the regional level, and the stage of democratic transformation in 1989 came as the most prominent station politically and popularly during that period, in which Queisi led his security mission in a balanced manner, due to the importance of that step, the transition towards broader democratic horizons, in the national context and the democratic image of Jordan externally.

The supervisory role, which was supported and closer to the democratic angle than the security angle, represented a platform under which the state succeeded in crossing and organizing the first parliamentary elections after the lifting of martial law, which received local and international certificates and was free of criticism even among the partisan and political opposition, whose representatives reached the parliament.

This security success in ensuring the integrity and success of the elections attracted attention to Queisi, who proved an ability and potential to ensure the compatibility and congruence of the security with the political, far from the image of contradiction or competition that impressionistically governed the relationship between them, to the extent that some bet that he - Queisi - was nominated among the options for the position of Prime Minister, whom the late King Hussein was keen to choose carefully for the sensitivity, requirements, and demands of that period.

However, Hussein, as many say, went for a more important strategic option from the perspective of national security, when he insisted on Queisi remaining in his position to continue for additional years that also enabled him to hold the 1993 parliamentary elections while he was at the head of the security institution.

Observers and politicians talk about that period, that Queisi blended in it between the vision of the security and the requirements of the political, especially since the requirements of entering the stage of democratic transformation had to be accompanied by security measures that would not have happened without the security institution's understanding of them, such as decisions that affected the return of passports of thousands of people that were confiscated in the martial law period, or the lifting of work and travel restrictions, and openness to partisan and political groups in Jordan and licensing them and turning them into a legitimate component.

== Facing regional challenges ==
The prominent role that Pasha Queisi distinguished himself with was not limited to stations, stages, and issues related to Jordanian local affairs, or confined to security issues, but from the standpoint of the national responsibility entrusted to the General Intelligence Directorate, dealing with many issues that affect the supreme national interest of Jordan was essential during that period.

From this standpoint, Queisi dealt during that period with the repercussions and outcomes of the regional challenges that accompanied and followed the First Gulf War (Iraq's invasion of Kuwait in 1990 and the Second Gulf War 1991), especially since the political and diplomatic relations between some countries witnessed a state of near stagnation, as a result of misunderstanding about the Jordanian position on the events at the time. During that period, the pace of international efforts to resolve the Arab-Israeli conflict also intensified, especially since the United States chose after the Second Gulf War to go to support the options of peace negotiations, and the launch of the Madrid Peace Conference, which was a stage that required Jordan to be fully prepared for what came after it, leading to Oslo and then the Jordanian-Israeli peace treaty in 1994.

The General Intelligence Directorate was involved during this period and supported the diplomatic and political activities of the Jordanian state in relation to its national interests. Its role has been described in accounts by politicians, security officials, journalists, and academics who were active during that time.

In addition to all these important challenges, the confrontation with the danger of terrorism, which posed an external threat to the Kingdom at the time, did not decline from the top of the Jordanian intelligence's priorities, especially since that period that followed the collapse of the Soviet Union and the return of those who were called the Afghan mujahideen, and then the formation of groups with political and ideological partisan goals as a result of the divisions in the Gulf War that sought to harm Jordan and its security and stability, and the intelligence apparatus, under Queisi's leadership, at the time confronted all these attempts and foiled all these attempts with great competence.

== Death ==
He died on December 1, 2019, where his last activity was his appearance receiving King Abdullah II who visited him at his home in Mahis in May 2019, to check on him and his health as a result of his illness. He was also honored after his death by the presence of his son Prince Hussein, the Crown Prince, at the mourning house to share his family's and clan's condolences for his loss.

The scene of honoring First Lieutenant General Mustafa Queisi at his death was awe-inspiring amidst an official and popular presence that reflected the appreciation and respect that the deceased enjoyed. Thousands carried the body in a solemn military funeral on the shoulders of his comrades in arms from the Jordanian Armed Forces after the afternoon prayer on Monday, December 2, 2019, where the body was carried from the King Hussein Medical Center to the Sahab Mosque where the prayer was performed on him, and then he was transported to his final resting place in the family cemetery in Sahab.

The Senior Advisor to King Abdullah II for Cultural and Religious Affairs, the Personal Envoy Prince Ghazi bin Muhammad participated in the burial ceremony, as he was next to the sons of the deceased in carrying the coffin on his shoulder and lowering it into its grave in appreciation and loyalty to Pasha Queisi's continuous giving in serving the Hashemite Kingdom of Jordan.
