= As-Salt Secondary School =

Coordinates: 32.0338°N 35.7291°E

As-Salt Secondary School مدرسة السلط الثانوية
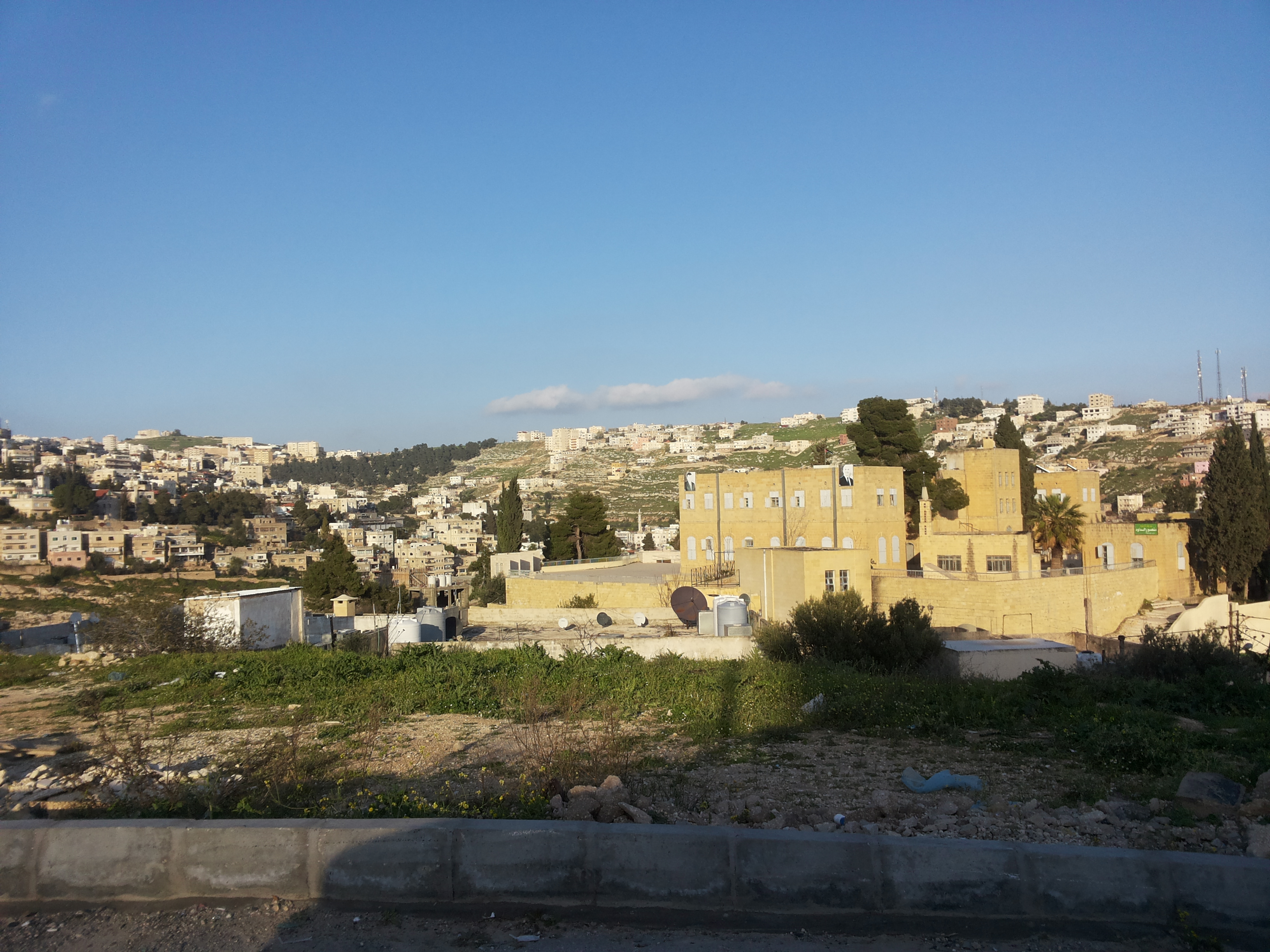
- As-Salt, Jordan

Information
- Language: Arabic and English

As-Salt Secondary School (Arabic: مدرسة السلط الثانوية), often regarded as the mother of Jordanian schools, is a historic institution closely linked to the establishment of the Emirate of Transjordan. The foundation stone was laid by King Abdullah I in 1923. Construction continued until 1925, when the first floor was completed. It is considered to be the oldest high school in Jordan. The school has since produced numerous notable Jordanian public figures, including five prime ministers, over forty ministers, university presidents, and college deans.

== History ==
=== Establishment and early years ===
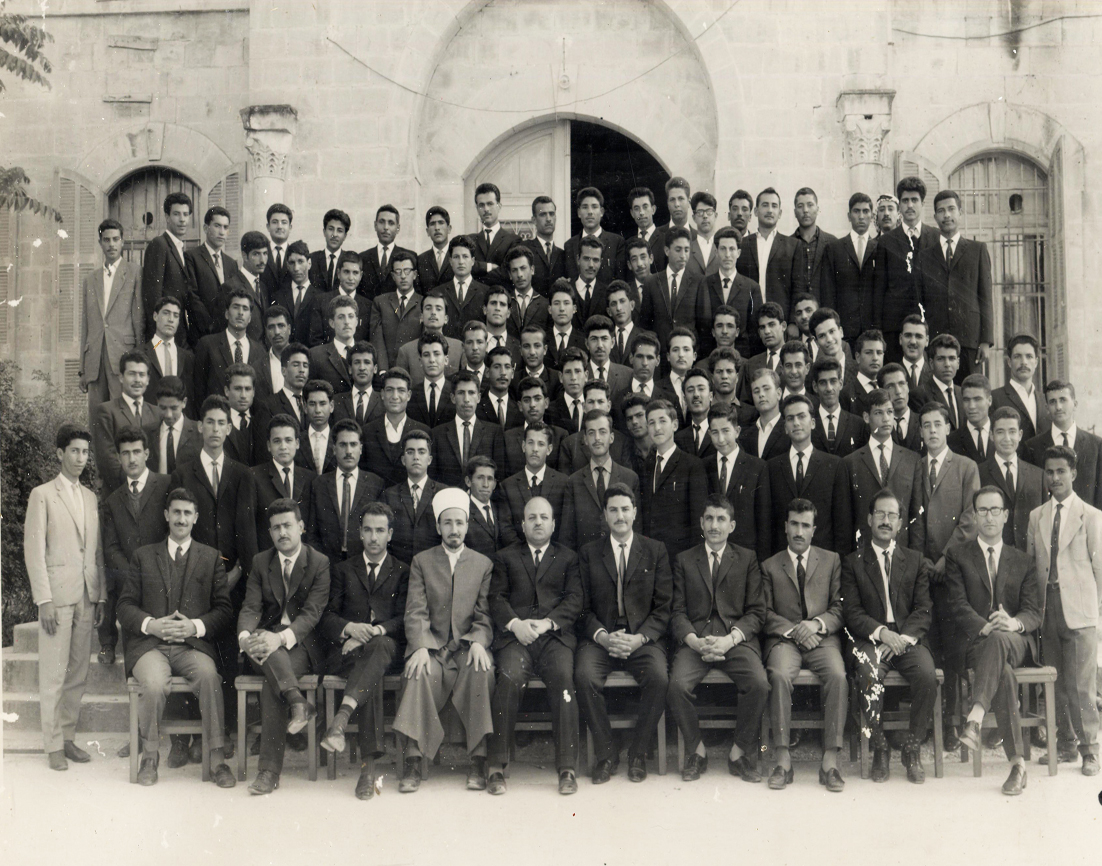
Teachers and students during the 1964–1965 academic year.

Some sources states that the school was established in 1919, not in 1925, initially operating in the homes of residents of As-Salt. It moved through several locations, including Beit Al-Rahwan (Arabic: بيت الرهوان), Beit Al-Haj Abdullah Al-Dawood (Arabic: بيت الحاج عبد الله الداود), Beit Rashid Al-Madfa'i (Arabic: بيت رشيد المدفعي), and Beit Fawzi Al-Nablusi (Arabic: بيت فوزي النابلسي). Eventually, the institution was built atop Jadour Hill, an archaeological site believed to be named after Jad, one of the sons of Prophet Jacob. This location is situated south of Old Salt, overlooking Wadi As-Salt from the south, and at the eastern entrance of the city, surrounded by both old and new neighborhoods.

=== Official inauguration ===
On December 28, 1923, King Abdullah I inaugurated the school building, which consisted of 17 rooms for administration and teaching. The academic years commenced in 1924 with teaching staff from Palestine, Syria, Lebanon, and Iraq. The first graduating class in 1925 included four students: Ahmad Al-Zahir, Dawood Abdul Rahman Tuffaha, AbdulRahim Al-Waked, and Ali Mohammad Abdullah Mismer. The second batch graduated in 1926 with three students.

=== Architectural style ===
The school's architectural style reflects Arab-Islamic architecture, characterized by the precise division of wings and rooms and detailed tile colorings. The building's design resembles those in Nablus, indicative of the commercial and population integration between the two cities.

== Academic curriculum ==
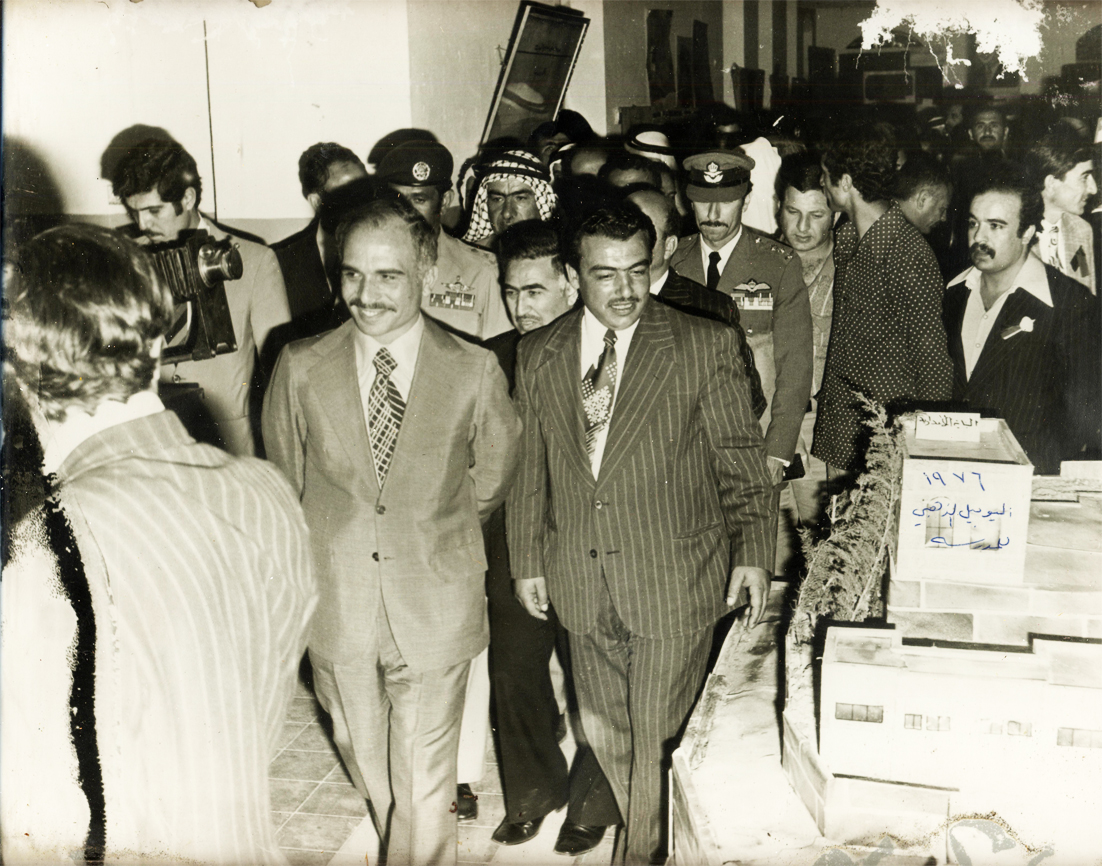
King Hussein appears next to the school principal in the school's golden jubilee in 1976.

The curriculum at As-Salt Secondary School was comprehensive, covering a wide range of subjects. Students were required to read the Quran, receive lessons in arithmetic, dictation, handwriting improvement, ethics, singing, drawing, engineering, algebra, surveying, history, geography, agriculture, physics, bookkeeping, handicrafts, English language, music, cleanliness, and orderliness.

== Names and evolution ==
Throughout its history, the school has had several names, including:

- Al-Sultaniya School (its first name) (Arabic: المدرسة السلطانية)
- Al-Salt Al-Amiriya School (Arabic: مدرسة السلط الأميرية)
- Al-Salt Preparatory School (Arabic: مدرسة السلط الاعدادية)
- Al-Harbi School (Arabic: مدرسة الحربي)
- Al-Tal School (Arabic: مدرسة التل)

Since 1938 it has been known as Salt Secondary School (Arabic: مدرسة السلط الثانوية), affectionately termed the "Mother of Schools" (Arabic: أم المدارس) by the late poet Husni Fariz, a graduate of its second batch and later a teacher and principal.

== Pioneering contributions ==
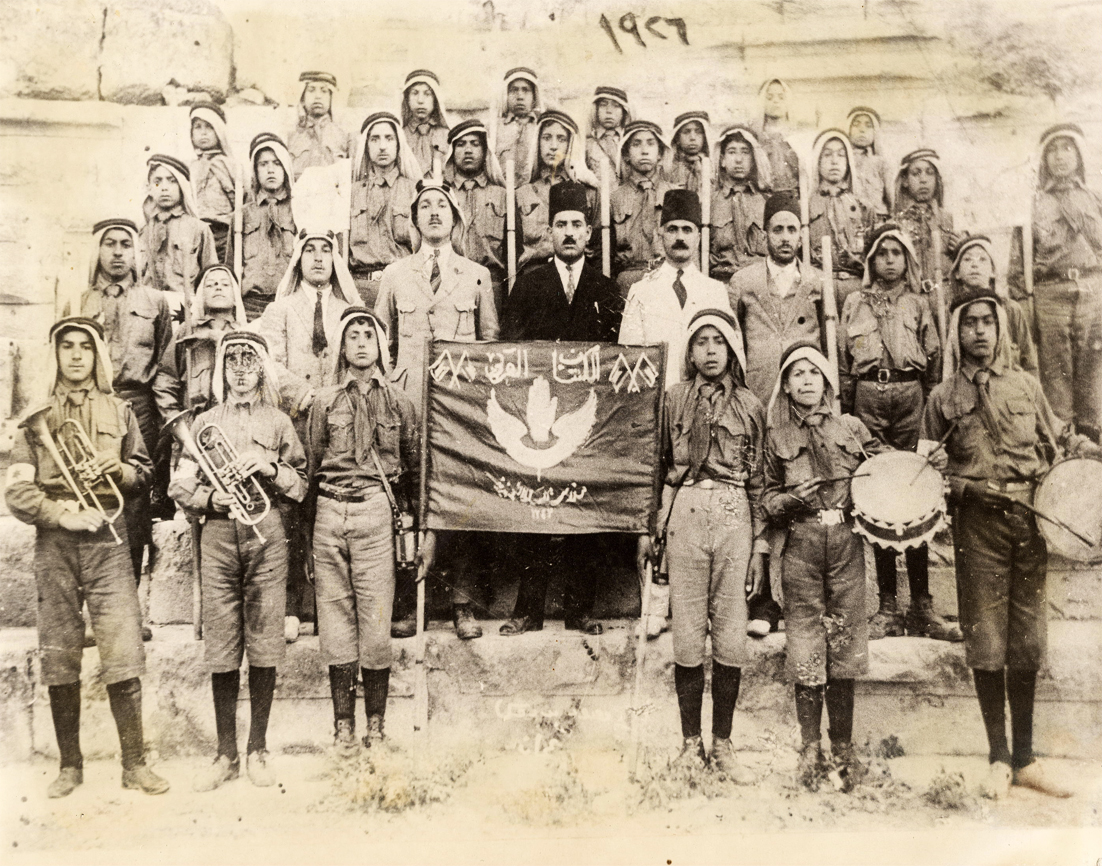
The first scout troop, the Arab Scout Team, in 1926.

As-Salt Secondary School has been a pioneer in many areas, housing Jordan's first school library established in 1925, the first scout troop in 1923, and the first animal welfare association (Animal Protection Association) formed by students in 1926. In 1938, the school released its first magazine, established a simple meteorological observatory, and its image appeared on a Jordanian postage stamp issued in 1982.
