= Jordan–Turkey relations =

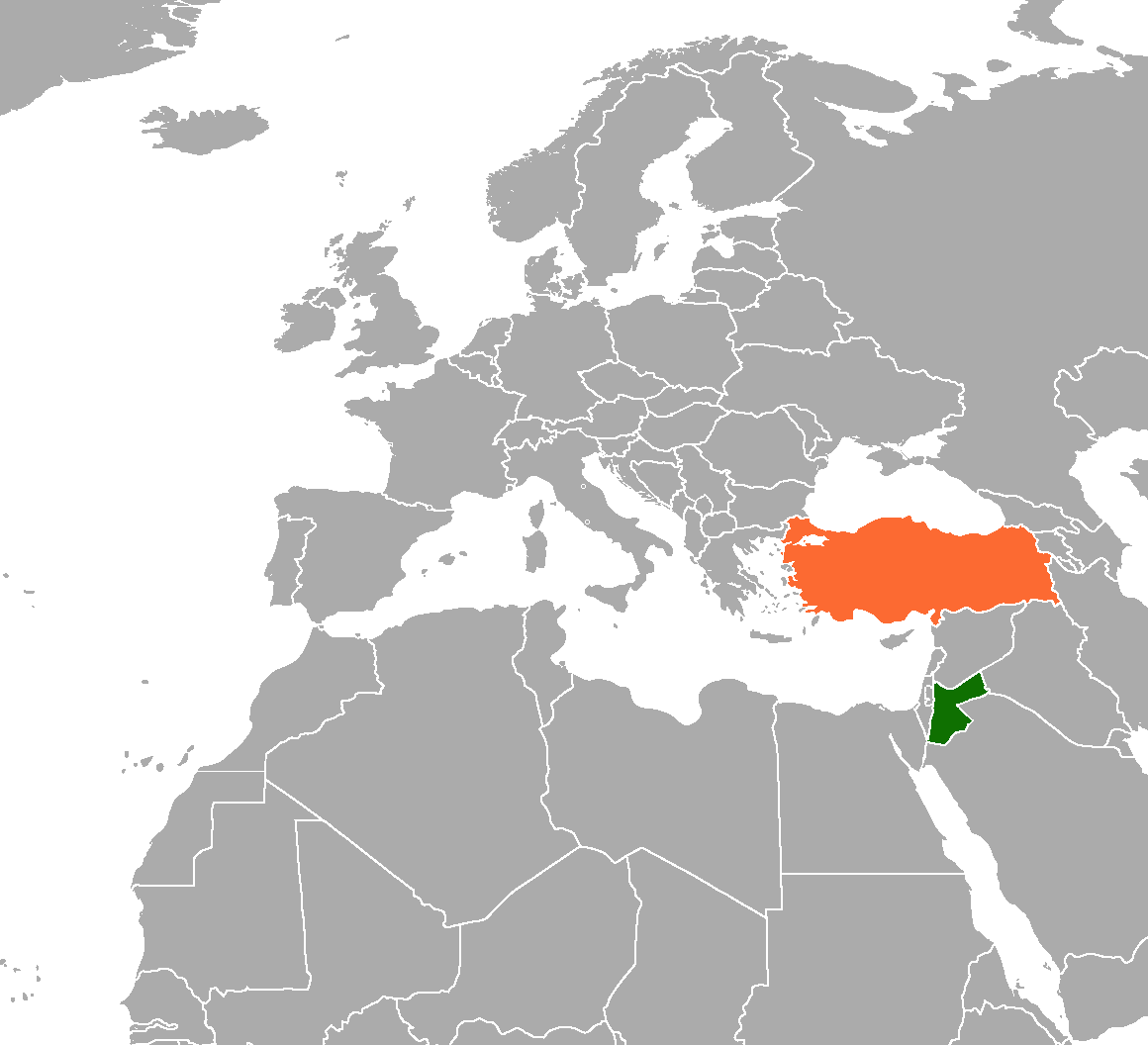

- Jordan: Turkey

Jordan–Turkey relations are the bilateral relations between Jordan and Turkey. Both nations share a relatively close relationship due to long historical commons, as both are majority two Sunni Muslim nations and sharing strong historic ties. Both countries are members of the Organisation of Islamic Cooperation.

== Historical relations ==
=== Ottoman Empire ===
Following Ottoman conquest, the Hashemite rulers of the Hejaz pledged allegiance to the Ottoman Sultan in 1517 following the Ottoman conquest of Egypt, placing the holy cities of Mecca and Medina under Ottoman Protection until the Arab revolt in 1916 when Sharif Hussayn of Mecca expelled them with the aid of Britain. This had led to scrutiny and hostilities from the Turks towards the Hashemites due to the Hashemites' attempt to create a post-Ottoman state, which ended up in failure.

=== Modern relations ===
Following the Turkish War of Independence, Sharif Abdullah and founder of Turkish Republic, Mustafa Kemal Atatürk had a close personal relationship, even met each other in Istanbul at 1937. In years next, with the complete independence of Jordan from British affairs at 1956, two countries established full relations. Entire of the Cold War, Jordan and Turkey both shared pro-Western view, strongly anti-communist and very critical of the new Islamic regime in Iran to a point they even supported Iraq during the Iran–Iraq War. Toward the end of the Cold War, both nations adopted to a new, more polar world.

== Political relations ==
In 2014, the Jordanian intelligence said that they arrested ISIS members who tried to enter Jordan from Syria in order to carry attacks against the country and the militants admitted upon interrogation that they have trained in Turkey. In early 2016, the King of Jordan, Abdullah II of Jordan, said that the Turkish president "believes in a radical Islamic solution to the problems in the region" and the "fact that terrorists are going to Europe is part of Turkish policy, and Turkey keeps getting a slap on the hand, but they get off the hook".

In February 2023, after the 2023 Turkey-Syria earthquake, Jordan provided urgent medical assistance to Turkey. The Jordanian government sent a medical hospital, a rescue team and medical aid to Turkey.

On 8 March 2025, high-level delegations from Turkey, Jordan, Syria, and Iraq met in Amman to discuss security cooperation. Turkish Foreign Minister Hakan Fidan emphasized the importance of joint efforts to combat the Islamic State in the region, marking the first such meeting. The foreign ministers, defense ministers, and intelligence heads of the four nations attended to discuss counterterrorism, organized crime, and regional developments, especially in Syria following the ousting of President Bashar al-Assad in December 2024.

== Cultural relations ==
As Jordan and Turkey are considered to be liberal in a turbulent region like MENA, Jordan and Turkey share a close tie based on common mutual gestures, although sometimes strained due to conflict with Jordanian interests. Two countries also vowed to strengthen their bilateral tie.

Both Jordan and Turkey share common concerns over the status of Jerusalem and criticized Israel's overact in the city.

Nonetheless, differences between Jordan and Turkey still prevail over trade disputes and the growing role of Turkey in the Middle East. Jordan, a country highly dependent on aid, has attempted to secure a neutral position on its relations with neighbors and hegemons, including Turkey.

== Military relations ==
Turkey and Jordan have coordinated on military matters, particularly concerning the fight against ISIS, with Turkey prioritizing the disarming of the Syrian Democratic Forces and their affiliated YPG militia, which it considers a terrorist group.

== Diplomatic missions ==
The Jordan embassy is located in Ankara.

The Turkish embassy is located in Amman.

== See also ==
- Foreign relations of Jordan
- Foreign relations of Turkey
- Iraq–Turkey relations
- Turks in Jordan
