= Ma'an Abu Nowar =

Jordanian politician and ambassador

- معن أبو نوار

Jordanian Ambassador to the United Kingdom of Jordan to United Kingdom
- In office 1973–1976
- Preceded by: Omar Nimr Nabulsi
- Succeeded by: Ibrahim Youssouf Ibrahim Izziddin

Personal details
- Born: July 26, 1928 Amman
- Died: September 22, 2016 (aged 88)
- Relatives: great cousin Ali Abu Nuwar
- Education: Oxford University

Ma’an Abu Nowar (Arabic: معن أبو نوار; 1928–2016) was a Jordanian major general, minister, diplomat, and historian. He held senior national roles including command positions in the Jordanian Armed Forces, head of the Public Security Directorate, deputy prime minister, ambassador to the United Kingdom, mayor of Amman, and senator in the Jordanian Parliament. He served as minister in several key portfolios and supported the establishment of Jordan’s Civil Defense. Over the decades, he contributed to the development of Jordan’s military institutions, public infrastructure, national media, and sports. In his later years, he authored historical works documenting Jordan’s modern political and military history.

== Early career and military service ==
Abu Nowar was born in Amman in 1928. He joined the Arab Legion in 1943, during the early years of Jordan’s military development. He served in various command and staff positions and was promoted to the rank of Major General in the Jordanian Armed Forces.

He later held a number of key national security roles. In 1965, he was appointed director of Jordan’s Civil Defense, where he played a major role in structuring and developing the institution during its formative years. In 1967, he was named director of public security, and in 1969, he became director of the Department of Moral Guidance (مدير التوجيه المعنوي), where he oversaw military publications, internal communication, and public messaging.

== Career ==
- In 1943 he joined Royal Jordanian Army.
- From 1957 to 1963 he was commander of the predominantly Bedouin Princess Alia Brigade an Infantry brigade.
- In 1963 he was counselor, Jordanian Embassy London.
- From 1964 to 1967 he was director of the Jordan Civil Defense
- From March 18, 1967 to 1969 he was director of Jordan Public Security.
- From 1969 to 1972 he was assistant chief of staff for general affairs.
- In 1972 he was minister of culture and information.
- From 1973 to 1976 he was ambassador in London (United Kingdom).
- In 1976 he was secretary of the capital, Amman.
- In 1979 he was minister of public works.
- In 1980 he was minister of culture, youth and minister of tourism and antiquities.
- In 1989 he was assistant chief of staff, editor of Al-Aqsa (newspaper of the Jordanian Armed Forces) director of Moral Guidance and published: The History of the Hashemite Kingdom of Jordan: The creation and development of Transjordan, 1920-1929.
- In 1993 he was minister of information.
- In 1994 he was appointed deputy prime minister and member of the Senate.
- In 1997 he retired from public service.
- He was a first class member of the Order of the Star of Jordan.

== Government roles ==
After concluding his military and security service, Ma’an Abu Nowar held several ministerial positions across different Jordanian cabinets between the 1970s and 1990s. These roles spanned a range of public sectors including media, culture, infrastructure, youth, and tourism.

He was appointed Minister of Culture and Information in October 1972, during a period when the ministry was responsible for both national cultural affairs and state media. His tenure coincided with an important phase of media expansion in Jordan, including upgrades to national television and radio broadcasting systems. He served in this role until May 1973.

In 1979, he was appointed Minister of Public Works, and the following year, he was named Minister of Culture, Youth, and Tourism and Antiquities, overseeing a wide portfolio related to cultural development, heritage preservation, and youth programs.

In 1993, Abu Nowar returned to government as Deputy Prime Minister and Minister of Information, during the cabinet of Abdelsalam Majali. This period saw renewed focus on media policy and international communication, particularly in the context of regional peace negotiations and post-Gulf War shifts.

He was later appointed to the Jordanian Senate, serving from 1993 to 1997.

== Mayor of Amman ==
Ma’an Abu Nowar served as Mayor of Amman from 1976 to 1979. During his time in office, the capital underwent a phase of urban expansion and municipal planning. Among the major infrastructure developments introduced during this period was the establishment of the traffic circle system, which later became a defining feature of Amman’s road layout.

His tenure aligned with broader national efforts to modernize infrastructure and respond to population growth. With his background in public works and civil administration, he contributed to the implementation of various municipal projects during a formative period in the city’s development.

== Diplomatic and parliamentary roles ==
In 1963, Ma’an Abu Nowar was posted to the Jordanian Embassy in London as a Minister Plenipotentiary. He served as Jordan’s senior representative in the United Kingdom.

He was later appointed as Ambassador to the United Kingdom, serving from 1973 to 1979 during a period of active diplomatic engagement between the two countries.

Following his diplomatic service, he was appointed to the Jordanian Senate (Majlis al-Aayan), where he participated in legislative review and contributed to national policy discussions.

== Sports and youth engagement ==
Ma’an Abu Nowar played an active role in shaping the landscape of organized sports in Jordan. During his tenure as President of the Jordan Football Association from 1979 to 1983, the association introduced several major national competitions that remain central to Jordanian football today, including the Jordan FA Cup (كأس الأردن), the Jordan Super Cup (كأس الكؤوس), and the Jordan Shield (درع الاتحاد).

In 1981, he was appointed president of the Jordan Olympic Committee, where he oversaw efforts to expand Jordan’s participation in international sporting events and enhance the country’s athletic infrastructure.

In parallel, Abu Nowar served as Minister of Youth, where he supported sports policy and programs aimed at expanding youth participation in athletics and cultural activities.

== Cultural and media contributions ==
In addition to his military and political roles, Ma’an Abu Nowar contributed extensively to the documentation of Jordan’s modern history through journalism and historical writing. Over several decades, he published more than 2,500 articles in Al-Rai newspaper and other Arabic publications.

He also authored several historical studies in both Arabic and English. His English-language publications include The Jordanian–Israeli War 1948–1951: A History of the Hashemite Kingdom of Jordan and The Development of Trans-Jordan 1929–1939.

In Arabic, his works include في سبيل القدس, معركة الكرامة, and others.

== Legacy and recognition ==
Ma’an Abu Nowar held a range of prominent roles across the military, government, diplomacy, media, and historical scholarship over the course of more than five decades. His career spanned key phases in the development of the Jordanian state.

In recognition of his public service, he was appointed to the Jordanian Senate in 1993, where he served until 1997. He also held the post of Deputy Prime Minister.

In military and security spheres, Abu Nowar played a role in the development of several national institutions, including the Civil Defense Department and the Public Security Directorate.

Beyond government, his contributions to public discourse and historical research left a documented record of key events in Jordan’s history. His published works continue to be cited by historians and researchers.

Abu Nowar remained active in public life well into the 2000s. He died on 22 September 2016 at the age of 88.

== Selected publications ==
=== English ===
- The Development of Trans-Jordan 1929–1939 – Ithaca Press, 2004
- The Jordanian–Israeli War, 1948–1951 – Ithaca Press, 2002
- The Creation and Early Development of Transjordan 1920–1929 – Ithaca Press, 2006

=== Arabic ===
- في سبيل القدس
- معركة الكرامة
- تاريخ شرق الأردن وقبائلها
- الدولة في السلم والحرب
- الألعاب الأوليمبية
- في الديمقراطية الحديثة
- رسائل إلى الشباب
