= Haql =

City and Governorate in Tabuk Province, Saudi Arabia

Haql Governorate محافظة حقل
- City and Governorate
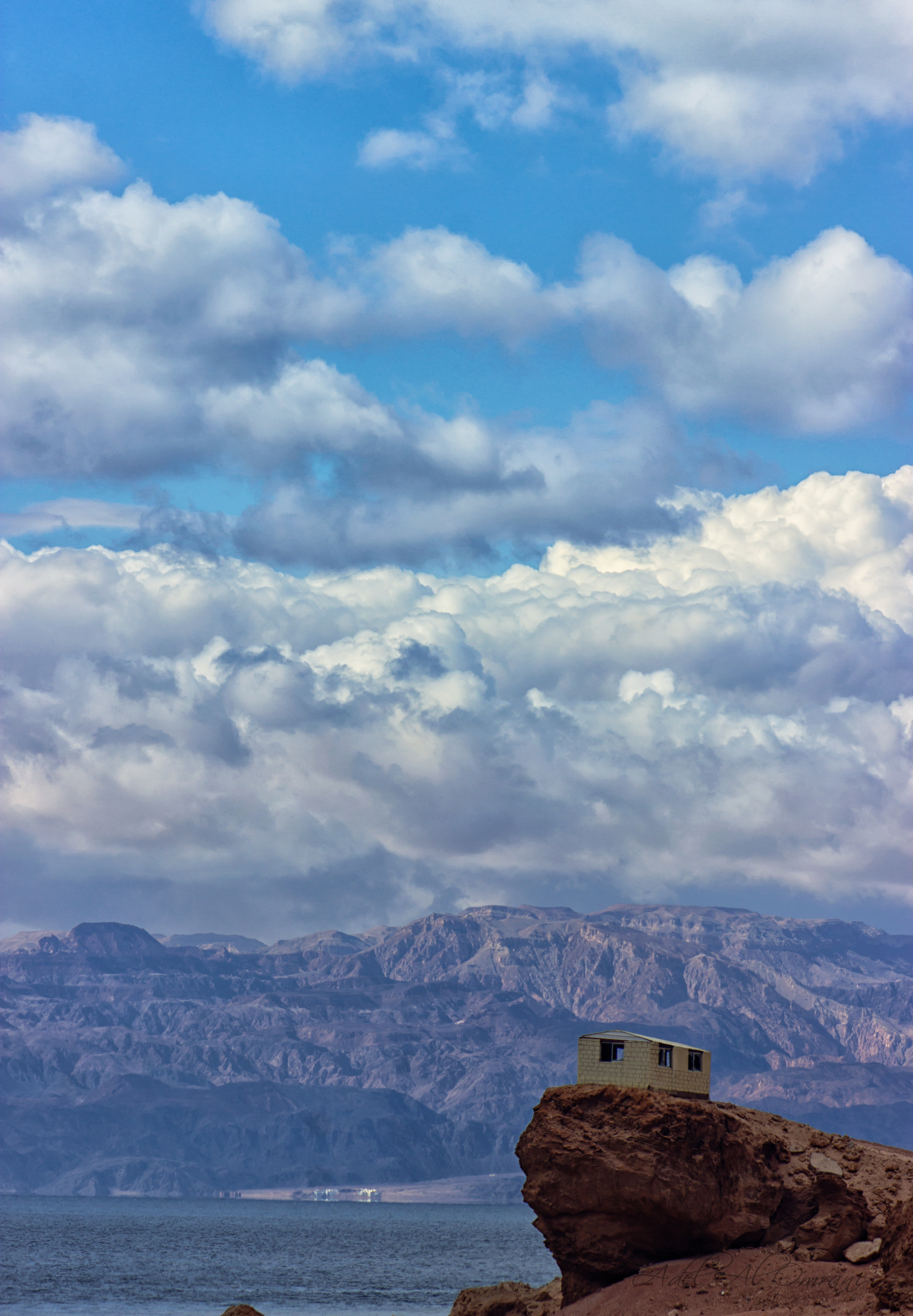
- Haql City

- Map Showing the Governorate’s Location within Tabuk Province

- Location of Haql within Saudi Arabia
- Coordinates: 29°17′N 34°56′E
- Country: Saudi Arabia
- Province: Tabuk Province
- Region: Hejaz
- Seat: Haql City

Government
  - Type: Municipality
  - Body: Haql Municipality

Population (2022)
  - Total: 27,712
- Time zone: UTC+03:00 (SAST)
- Area code: 014

Haql (Arabic: حقل, Ḥaql) is a city and governorate in the northwest of Saudi Arabia, within the Tabuk Province. It is located near the head of the Gulf of Aqaba and sits adjacent to Aqaba City across the Jordanian border.

== Population ==
Historical population
Year	Pop.	±% p.a.
2010	28,399	—
2022	27,712	−0.20%

== Climate ==
Haql has a hot desert climate (Köppen climate classification BWh), with most of its rainfall occurring during the winter months. The average annual temperature is 24.3 °C (75.7 °F), and the city receives approximately 24 mm (0.94 in) of precipitation per year.

Climate data for Haql
Month	Jan	Feb	Mar	Apr	May	Jun	Jul	Aug	Sep	Oct	Nov	Dec	Year
Mean daily maximum °C (°F)	21.1 (70.0)	22.8 (73.0)	25.8 (78.4)	29.9 (85.8)	34.0 (93.2)	36.8 (98.2)	37.4 (99.3)	37.8 (100.0)	35.2 (95.4)	31.9 (89.4)	27.1 (80.8)	22.2 (72.0)	30.2 (86.3)
Mean daily minimum °C (°F)	10.7 (51.3)	11.7 (53.1)	14.3 (57.7)	17.8 (64.0)	20.3 (68.5)	23.8 (74.8)	25.3 (77.5)	25.6 (78.1)	24.1 (75.4)	20.8 (69.4)	16.5 (61.7)	11.9 (53.4)	18.6 (65.4)
Average precipitation mm (inches)	3 (0.1)	5 (0.2)	5 (0.2)	3 (0.1)	1 (0.0)	0 (0)	0 (0)	0 (0)	0 (0)	1 (0.0)	3 (0.1)	3 (0.1)	24 (0.9)
Source: Climate Data

== Transportation ==
=== Air ===
Haql does not have its own airport. Air travel for the governorate is primarily served by the Prince Sultan International Airport in Tabuk City, the main airport of the province.

== See also ==
- Provinces of Saudi Arabia
- List of islands of Saudi Arabia
- List of mountains in Saudi Arabia
- List of governorates of Saudi Arabia
- List of cities and towns in Saudi Arabia
