= 2026 Iranian strikes on Israel =

- Part of the 2026 Iran war
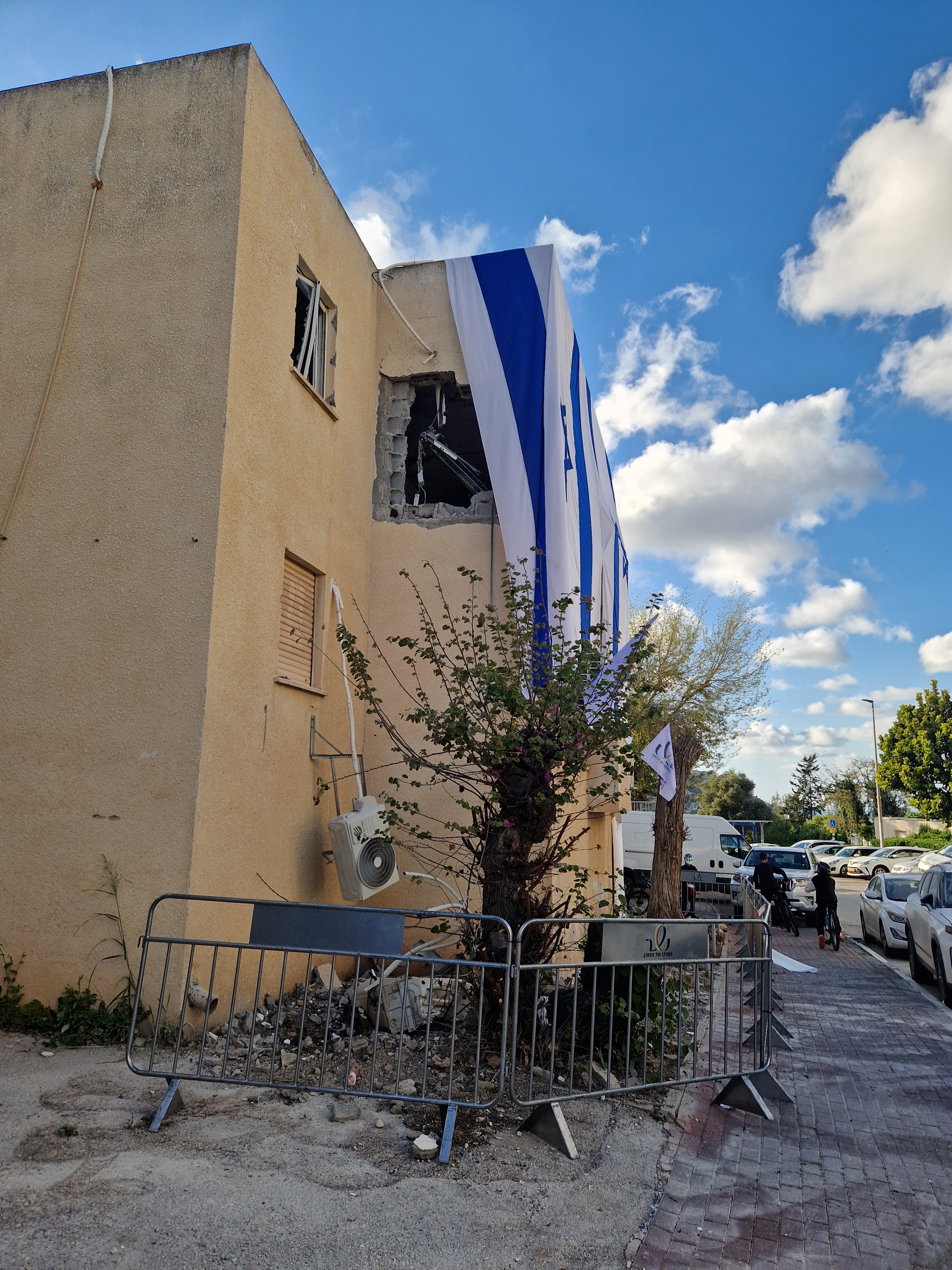
- Homes in Nesher damaged by shrapnel from Iranian cluster munitions
Date	28 February 2026 – present
Location	Israel
Status	Ongoing

Belligerents
Iran	Israel

Units involved
- See order of battle

Casualties and losses
(Iran) None	(Israel) 26 killed (Israel) 4,292 injured

Since the 2026 Iran war began with a series of attacks by the United States and Israel against Iran on 28 February 2026, following the breakdown of US-Iran talks and negotiations, locations across Israel have been subject to multiple retaliatory Iranian missile strikes. For several days after the start of hostilities, Israeli airspace was closed, disrupting flights from Ben Gurion Airport and elsewhere in the country. Despite a robust system of missile defense, warning alerts and shelters, Iranian missiles have struck multiple positions across the country. The largest death toll was in a strike on 1 March that targeted a residential neighborhood in Beit Shemesh, kiling nine Israeli civilians.

== Background ==
On 28 February 2026, joint missile attacks were coordinated by the United States and Israel, hitting multiple locations in Iran. US President Donald Trump stated that the attacks were part of an effort to instigate regime change through Iranians taking over their government, among other goals including termination of Iran's nuclear program. Following the strikes, the Iranian government launched retaliatory strikes across the region, with airstrikes hitting countries across the Persian Gulf, but largely focused on Israel.

== Missile and civil defense preparations ==
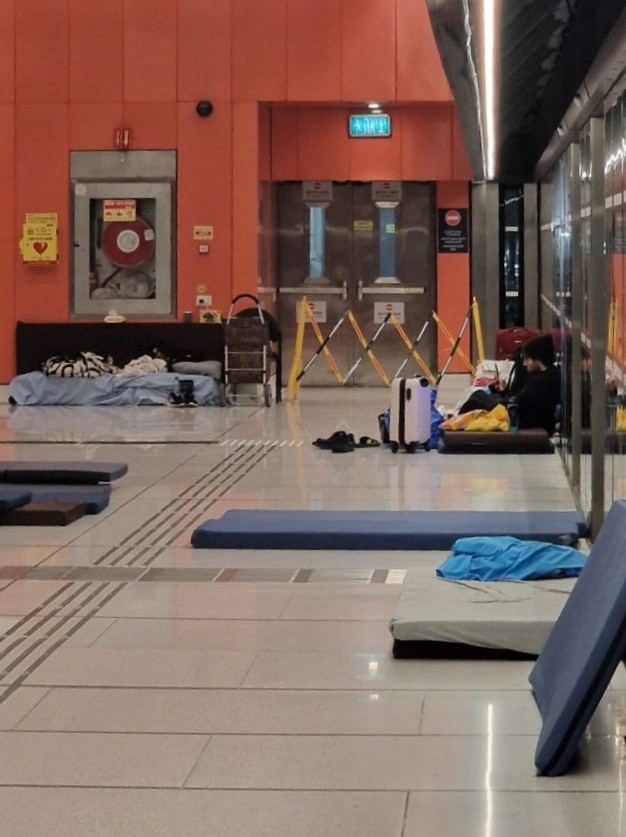
Civilians sheltering in a converted light rail station in Israel

Civil defense siren and missile explosions sounds in central Israel, March 5, 2026

Israel has a multi-layered missile defense system that includes the Arrow system of anti-ballistic missiles designed to intercept and destroy missiles launched from Iran and from the Houthis in Yemen, David's Sling to intercept drones and medium-ranged missiles and Iron Dome for shorter-range rockets.

After Israel was attacked by Scud missiles in the Gulf War and the challenges and inadequacies of the then-standard communal shelter, the Israeli Home Front Command established upgraded standards for civil defense that included technical specifications for designated protected spaces in all residences, known by its Hebrew acronym as a Mamad. The Mamad is designed as a reinforced security room offering protection against high-impact projectiles, to withstand blast and shrapnel from conventional weapons and offer protection against chemical and biological weapons, with reinforced concrete walls and ceilings measuring 20 to 30 centimetres (7.9 to 11.8 in) in thickness and airtight / blast-resistant steel doors and windows.

Sirens are set off to notify residents of the area to seek shelter, usually within 90 seconds of the start of the siren. Missiles from Iran can be detected after launch as early as ten minutes before projected impact and an app created by the Israeli Home Front Command can provide Israeli citizens several minutes of advance notice of a possible siren.

== Pattern of missile attacks ==
France 24 reported that the number of missile attacks from Iran had dropped sharply by the fifth day of the war, though it acknowledged that the reasons for the decline were "unclear". An analysis performed by the Jewish Institute for National Security of America showed that there had been a sharp reduction in Iranian missile attacks after the first day of the war, both in attacks targeted against Israel and those aimed at other nations. Their analysis showed that the number of Iranian missiles aimed at Israel was far lower than the numbers launched during the Twelve-Day War in 2025, when the Iranian forces commonly launched large barrages of missiles intended to overwhelm Israel defenses, and hypothesized that the reduction in launches could be attributed to Israeli success in targeting launchers and storage locations in 2025 and joint US-Israeli efforts during the 2026 conflict to eliminate as many as three-quarters of Iranian missile launchers, including those that had been rebuilt in the intervening months. By the tenth day of the war, Iranian missile and drone attacks had dropped by more than 90%, a reduction that was steeper than during the 2025 conflict and that was credited to effective suppression efforts by US and Israeli missions over Iran. Alternative explanations for the reduction in missiles targeting Israel by day 10 of the war including Iranian efforts to preserve what's left in its stockpile and a more unstructured command and control system after the strike in Tehran decapitated much of senior leadership.

In the 40 days from the start of the war through the 8 April ceasefire, there were a total of 650 missile attacks from Iran to Israel, the majority of which carried cluster munitions. About 16 of the missiles that made it past Israeli missile defenses carried conventional warheads, while 50 had cluster munitions. The attacks killed a total of 24 people, all of them civilians, and resulted in more than 7,000 injuries. Of the 24 civilians killed, 14 were struck by warheads with conventional explosive warheads and 10 were victims of cluster submunitions; two of the deaths were inside a sheltered space, with the other fatalities being people in unprotected areas.

=== Use of cluster munitions ===
By the tenth day of the war, Iran had fired a total of 300 missiles at Israel, of which nearly half had cluster submunitions, which can spread dozens of explosive warheads over a radius of 10 kilometres (6.2 mi), a practice banned by the Convention on Cluster Munitions, an international treaty signed by more than 100 nations, but not by Iran, Israel or the United States. After the Twelve-Day War, Amnesty International condemned Iran's use of these munitions targeting residential areas as "a flagrant violation of international humanitarian law," with the organization's Erika Guevara Rosas stating that these are "inherently indiscriminate weapons that must never be used" and that the manner in which they were fired at Israel "demonstrated clear disregard for international humanitarian law."

The executive director of the Arms Control Association called the Iranian targeting of cluster munition warheads at residential neighborhoods deliberate, saying that "Iran appears to be launching them into relatively populated areas, probably with the goal of producing potential civilian harm."

== Incidents ==
=== 28 February ===
A missile struck a building in Tel Aviv, killing one and injuring dozens. Despite having advance notice of the Iranian missile launch, the sirens in the area did not sound in time to allow the 90 seconds allocated to make it to a sheltered space.

=== 1 March ===
A missile attack in a residential area of the city of Beit Shemesh, located 18 miles (29 km) from Jerusalem, struck a shelter in a synagogue. Nine civilians were killed and dozens were injured. The incident had the largest casualty count since the start of the conflict and was part of a series of what Al Jazeera English described as "retaliatory attacks" following the killing of Ayatollah Ali Khamenei in a targeted attack on a compound in Tehran conducted the previous day. At least two interceptors had been launched against the missile which was a direct hit on the communal shelter; the large death toll demonstrated the limits of Israel's missile defense network and showed that even reinforced shelters could be vulnerable in extreme circumstance. Amnesty International investigated evidence of the strike and issued a statement that condemned the use of a missile that is inherently inaccurate with no legitimate nearby military target as "a violation of international humanitarian law" for which the individuals involved should be prosecuted for war crimes.

=== 9 March ===
Two workers were killed and a third seriously injured in Yehud, outside of Tel Aviv, after being struck by submunitions from an Iranian missile equipped with a cluster bomb warhead. The two had been struck outdoors at a construction site and had not been in a protected shelter; the first victim was killed immediately, while the second victim succumbed the following day. Other areas struck in the same attack wave included Bat Yam, Holon and Or Yehuda.

=== 12 March ===
The Iranian military claimed that it targeted IDF bases including Palmachim Airbase, and Ovda Airbase as well as the Shin Bet headquarters.

=== 16 March ===
Debris from an Iranian missile attack fell on the Old City of Jerusalem, causing damage on the Temple Mount near the Al-Aqsa Mosque, at the Church of the Holy Sepulchre and inside the Jewish Quarter.

=== 17 March ===
A missile launched from Iran with a cluster warhead hit a building in Ramat Gan and killed two residents in their 70s, who were found just outside their safe room; another missile targeted at the Jerusalem as part of the barrage was intercepted. A statement from the Islamic Revolutionary Guard Corps called the death of the two civilians "revenge for the blood of martyr Dr. Ali Larijani and his companions," who had been killed a day before as the target of an Israeli airstrike.

=== 18 March ===
In a series of Iranian cluster bomb attacks, a foreign worker from Thailand at Moshav Adanim was killed by shrapnel from a missile while a group of three women at a beauty salon in the West Bank village of Beit Awwa, near Hebron, were killed when they were struck by debris from a cluster munition.

A missile strike damaged three empty private planes parked at Ben Gurion Airport, leading Israeli authorities to reduce to 130 the maximum number of passengers permitted on outbound flights.

=== 19 March ===
Iran launched a total of 14 salvos towards Israel, with as many as five towards Jerusalem and northern Israel within the span of an hour.

Additional reports indicated that Iranian strikes on 19 March caused damage at multiple locations in Israel. According to Reuters, a missile attack hit an oil refinery in Haifa, resulting in reported damage. The attack occurred amid continued exchanges of missile fire between Iran and Israel during the conflict.

=== 20 March ===
Iran launched a total of 9 salvos towards Israel.

=== 21 March ===
In response to the U.S. strike on its Natanz Nuclear Facility using bunker buster bombs earlier in the day, Iran struck the southern Israeli town of Dimona, injuring at least 47 people. Iran said that it had targeted the Shimon Peres Negev Nuclear Research Center, though the targets struck in the wave of Iranian retaliation attacks were all in residential neighborhoods in the Negev, hitting Dimona, located 20 kilometres (12 mi) away from the facility, and later in the day in Arad, which is 35 kilometres (22 mi) away. The attack in Arad wounded 71 people, including 10 people who were seriously injured.

=== 22 March ===
Iran launched a total of 10 attacks towards Israel.

=== 24 March ===
Iran launched a total of 14 attacks towards Israel.

=== 28 March ===
An Iranian missile attack killed one civilian at a residential building Tel Aviv, the attack left also two wounded. The individual killed was guarding an area in which there had been a fatal missile attack earlier in the war and was struck by a cluster munition while in an unprotected area.

=== 29 March ===
Iran launched a total of 10 salvos of ballistic missiles towards Israel.

=== 30 March ===
Iran launched a total of 7 salvos of ballistic missiles towards Israel.

=== 31 March ===
Iran launched at least 3 volleys of ballistic missiles towards Israel. On the same day, the Times of Israel reported that the average number of ballistic missiles launched from Iran towards Israel fell from 90 on the first day to 10-15 a day.

=== 1 April ===
A cluster munition attack hit Bnei Brak spreading bomblets over an extensive residential neighborhood. There were 14 civilians wounded in the attack, including an 11-year-old girl who was critically injured. After three weeks in the intensive care unit, the girl died from her wounds on 24 April, bringing the death toll in Israel to 28 since the start of the war.

Iran launched at least 6 salvos of ballistic missiles towards Israel.

=== 2 April ===
An Iranian ballistic missile strike damaged an Israeli drone factory in Petah Tikva.

=== 3 April ===
Iran launched a total of 7 salvos of ballistic missiles towards Israel.

=== 4 April ===
Fragment of an Iranian missile strike hit in the vicinity of the IDF's Kirya headquarters in Tel Aviv.

=== 5 April ===
Four civilians in Haifa were killed when a direct strike by an Iranian missile on their residential building caused a partial collapse. The individuals were in a stairwell and had not made it into a shelter in the building. After a failed missile interception, the Iranian projectile struck the six-story building without exploding, causing the structure's upper floors to collapse.

=== 7 June ===
Iran launched ballistic missiles at Israel in response to Israeli airstrikes on Beirut's southern suburbs. The attack marked Iran's first direct missile strike against Israel since the April 2026 ceasefire. Iranian officials stated that the attack was carried out in retaliation for the Israeli strike and warned of further action if attacks on Lebanon continued. The Israel Defense Forces said that no immediate casualties or damage were reported.

=== 8 June ===
Israel carried out airstrikes against military targets in western and central Iran, hours after Iran launched missiles at Israel in response to Israeli airstrikes on Beirut's southern suburbs. Iranian media reported explosions in Tehran, Tabriz and Isfahan. Iranian authorities reported that the Karun petrochemical complex in Mahshahr was partially damaged following Israeli strikes.

Iran launched additional waves of missiles toward Israel, triggering air raid sirens in several areas of the country, including Jerusalem. The Islamic Revolutionary Guard Corps (IRGC) stated that it had targeted the Tel Nof and Nevatim airbases in response to Israeli strikes on Iranian territory.

=== 19 July ===
An Iranian missile fired towards Jordan's King Hussein International Airport, near Aqaba, was intercepted by an American Aegis Ballistic Missile Defense System with remaining fragments landing north of Eilat, after being shot down using Israel's Iron Dome. Israel Defense Forces Chief of the General Staff Eyal Zamir warned that Israel would respond to any closer such attacks with counterattacks against Iran.

== See also ==
- 2026 drone strikes on Akrotiri and Dhekelia
- 2026 Iranian strikes on Bahrain
- 2026 Iranian strikes on Jordan
- 2026 Iranian strikes on Kuwait
- 2026 Iranian strikes on Qatar
- 2026 Iranian strikes on Saudi Arabia
- 2026 Iranian strikes on the United Arab Emirates
- Iran–Israel relations
