= Bahrain in the 2026 Iran war =

- Part of the 2026 Iran war
- Bahrain in the 2026 Iran war (Bahrain)
Date	28 February 2026 – present
Location	Bahrain
Status	Ongoing; US Navy Fifth Fleet central headquarters base damaged by Iranian attacks

Belligerents
Iran; Islamic Resistance in Iraq; Jaysh al-Ghadab	Bahrain; Kuwait; United States; United Arab Emirates; Defensive/precautionary: United Kingdom; Canada

Units involved
- See order of battle

Casualties and losses
(Iran) Several missiles and drones intercepted	(United States) 2 DOD employes wounded (United States) 1 oil tanker damaged
- (Bahrain) 1 civilian killed and 51 injured (Bangladesh) 1 Bangladeshi civilian killed

After United States and Israel launched the 2026 Iran war, Iran conducted retaliatory missile and drone strikes on Bahrain. These began on 28 February 2026 with strikes on buildings in the capital of Manama, including the district of Juffair, where the US Navy's 5th Fleet is headquartered at Naval Support Activity Bahrain. Later strikes primarily targeted American military installations and industrial, commercial and residential infrastructure. Bahrain and Kuwait struck back at Iran in July, with support from the UAE.

By 11 June 2026, Iranian strikes in Bahrain had killed 2 people and wounded 51 more.

== Background ==
On 28 February 2026, the United States and Israel launched a joint missile strike on targets in Iran. U.S. officials, including US President Donald Trump, offered various and shifting reasons for the attack, including regime change and halting Iran's nuclear program. The Iranian government retaliated with strikes on targets in several countries around the Persian Gulf.

== Incidents ==
=== February ===
28 February

External videos
- Moment Iranian Missile Hits US Base in Bahrain
- Smoke billows from US Naval Base in Bahrain
- Moment Drone Strikes Era Tower in Bahrain Amid Iran Retaliation

Officials reported that three buildings in Manama and Muharraq were subject to drone attacks and falling debris from an intercepted missile, with footage showing a drone strike the Era Views Tower. Air raid sirens were activated following the attack.

The American Fifth Fleet headquarters, located in Bahrain, was struck during an Iranian missile and drone attack on 28 February. Around 300 British personnel were stationed nearby, but no casualties were reported. Later footage showed smoke rising in the direction of the base. CBC News, citing the Canadian Department of National Defence's website, reported that Canadian soldiers were present on exchange with the United States military at the U.S. Fifth Fleet headquarters in Bahrain at the time of the attack.

=== March ===
1 March

The United States Embassy in Bahrain issued a warning to Americans in the country to avoid hotels in the capital, Manama, following the incidents. The embassy reported that one of the struck buildings was the Crowne Plaza hotel.

By the beginning of March, the Bahraini government said it had intercepted 54 drone and missile strikes across the country.

2 March

In the early morning hours, Mina Salman Port in Bahrain was struck by an Iranian missile, and a Bangladeshi shipyard worker was killed by falling debris after another Iranian missile was intercepted there. The strike injured 2 more and set the American MT Stena Imperative oil tanker ablaze. The crew aboard the ship reported no casualties. Additionally, impact from debris that day hit an Amazon Web Services data center, causing electricity issues there.

Two US Department of Defense employees were wounded by Iranian strikes.

3 March

Iran stated that it had struck an American air base in Sheikh Isa.

The same day, Canadian Defence Minister David McGuinty confirmed Canadian military presence in the Middle East and stated that they had not suffered any casualties. McGuinty also announced that the Canadian Armed Forces will "assess any potential impacts on CAF personnel in the region."

5 March

Bahrain reported that the industrial area of Ma'ameer was targeted by "Iranian aggression" causing "limited material damage" and no casualties.

8 March

An Iranian drone damaged a desalination plant in Bahrain.

9 March

An explosion near Manama sparked a fire near a petroleum refinery and resulted in injuries to at least 32 Bahraini citizens, four of them "serious cases". An analysis by academic researchers examined by Reuters found that an American-operated Patriot missile was likely involved in the blast after it downed an Iranian drone mid-air. Following the attack on its oil refinery complex, Bahrain’s state oil company BAPCO announced force majeure on its group operations.

10 March

Debris from an Iranian drone attack on an office tower in the Seef District killed a 29-year old Bahraini woman and injured eight others.

Gulf Air, Bahrain's national airline, relocated its airplane fleet from Bahrain International Airport to various airports in neighbouring Saudi Arabia.

11 March

Bahrain said that it intercepted Iranian missiles and drones overnight.

12 March

An Iranian strike on a fuel depot in the Muharraq Governorate, close to the airport, resulted in a large fire. The Ministry of Interior announced the arrest of 4 Bahraini nationals for spying and transmitting sensitive information to the Islamic Revolutionary Guard Corps. The Bahrain Defence Force announced that it had intercepted 112 ballistic missiles and 186 drones since the start of the war.

15 March

Bahrain said that it had intercepted 125 missiles and 211 drones from Iran since the beginning of the war.

20 March

According to sources in Bahrain, a warehouse caught fire due to shrapnel after another Iranian attack.

21 March

Jaysh al-Ghadab, a pro-Iranian Shia militant group in Iraq, attacked US positions in Bahrain with drones.

28 March

Bahrain Aluminium Company said that its facilities were attacked by Iran and two people were injured. According to official figures released by Bahrain, 174 missiles and 391 drones have been intercepted since the beginning of the war.

30 March

Iran launched an attack on the Sheikh Isa Air Base. Satellite imagery show the several P-8 surveillance aircraft hangars were hit.

=== April ===
1 April

Iran struck Bahrain's largest telecom operator. According to reports this marks the first hit on American tech companies, following the Iranian threat. The site hosting Amazon Web Services, was hit by Iranian missiles.

Violent clashes between Bahraini security forces and anti-monarchy rioters occurred in the country.

2 April

The IRGC said it targeted an cloud computing center belonging to Amazon in Bahrain.

5 April

An Iranian drone attack hit a storage facilities belonging to Bapco Energies in Bahrain, starting fires at operational units and storage tanks. The fire was extinguished and no injuries reported.

6 April

The Bahrain Defence Force announced that it has intercepted 188 missiles and 468 drones since the start of the war.

8 April

Despite the ceasefire agreement between the US and Iran, hostilities between Iran and Bahrain continued. According to Bahrain's Interior Ministry, following a night of Iranian attacks on houses in the Sitra area, sirens were heard after another round of Iranian drone strikes.

=== June ===
3 June

Iran said it had targeted the U.S. Fifth Fleet headquarters with missiles and drones in response to an American attack on communication towers near Qeshm Island. CENTCOM said the US military shot down the incoming Iranian missiles and drones headed for Bahrain.

6 June

Iran announced that it had targeted a US navy site in Bahrain with ballistic missiles. After the attacks, CENTCOM said that of the seven Iranian missiles launched, six were shot down and one failed to reach its target.

11 June

Iran reported launching attacks on communication antennas and radar facilities of the Patriot system located at American military bases Bahrain in retaliation to US strikes. Downed Iranian drones landed in populated areas of Manama, causing damage to houses, igniting vehicles, and leaving wreckage. An official report indicated that an 11-year-old girl sustained minor injuries in the event.

=== July ===
14 July

In Iranian attacks at U.S. bases in Bahrain, Iran set fire to the fleet's fuel tanks, and hit and destroyed the Patriot radar, the fleet's air control radar, and a C-RAM early warning radar system. The unmanned guided-boat control and monitoring center was also destroyed at this stage.

21 July

The Islamic Revolutionary Guard Corps (i.e. IRGC) mentioned that it destroyed a US air defence system and radar installations in Bahrain’s Muharraq area.

24 July

A report from The Wall Street Journal confirmed that Bahrain alongside Kuwait has attacked military targets inside Iran earlier in July, with air and intelligence support from the United Arab Emirates.

Iran has announced that in response to recent US attacks, fuel tanks, large equipment depots, silos and a barracks housing US forces at Issa Air Base in Bahrain have been targeted by Arash suicide drones.

31 July

Iran’s army said it had launched attacks on strategic U.S. assets and military bases in Bahrain (and Kuwait).

=== August ===
28 August

According to Military Times, the damage to the U.S. Naval Support Activity (NSA) in Bahrain is estimated at nearly $400 million. The damaged facilities reportedly include the Fifth Fleet headquarters, communications towers, a barracks, several warehouses, and other buildings.

=== September ===
2 September

The Islamic Republic of Iran's army announced that "In the 29th phase of Operation Saeeqah and in response to the enemy's aggression against the southern regions of the country, the Islamic Republic of Iran's army targeted radar installations and gathering centers of American forces at the Sheikh Isa base in Bahrain with massive drone attacks".

=== November ===
On November 13, Bahrain's Ministry of Foreign Affairs condemned what it described as Iran's renewed aggression after recent air strikes on Riffa Air Base. The ministry stated that these attacks, carried out by Iran's Islamic Revolutionary Guard Corps (IRGC), breach international law and violate state sovereignty. Bahrain holds Iran entirely accountable for the attacks. Iran claimed responsibility for destroying a US radar installation in Bahrain. This is the first time in more than two months that the country has targeted a military site in a Persian Gulf nation. The semi-official Tasnim news agency reported that Iran’s Islamic Revolutionary Guard Corps (IRGC) announced: "A few hours ago, in retaliation for an enemy airstrike on a telecommunications tower in Sirik, the IRGC Aerospace Force struck and destroyed an early-warning radar system used by the invading U.S. military in Bahrain." They also stated that this action is intended as a "strong warning" to Washington.

On November 17, Iran again struck U.S. radar facilities in Bahrain.

On 21 November, the Islamic Revolutionary Guard Corps of Iran reported that it had carried out strikes against US air-defence radar installations at the al-Rafa and Awali air bases in Bahrain.

== Reactions ==
On 26 March, Bahrain along with other five Gulf countries (Saudi Arabia, Kuwait, UAE, Qatar, and Jordan) issued a joint condemnation about Iran and its affiliated armed groups in Iraq, attacks against countries in the region and their facilities and infrastructure. In late March, Bahrain, serving as president of the UN Security Council, proposed a resolution to the Strait of Hormuz crisis. As Russia and China rejected the initial draft stating that countries could use "all defensive means necessary" to keep the Strait open, a softer version was written. On 7 April, Russia and China again vetoed Bahrain's resolution by the United Nations Security Council by a vote of 11-2 to safeguard international shipping through the Strait of Hormuz. On 10 April, Bahrain sent a letter to the UN on behalf of itself, Saudi Arabia, the United Arab Emirates, Qatar and Kuwait, condemning the Iranian attacks. The Iranian army announced that it had targeted a series of military targets in Bahrain (and Jordan, Kuwait) in response to recent US attacks.

== See also ==
- 2026 drone strikes on Akrotiri and Dhekelia
- 2026 Iranian strikes on Kuwait
- 2026 Iranian strikes on Israel
- 2026 Iranian strikes on Qatar
- 2026 Iranian strikes on Saudi Arabia
- 2026 Iranian strikes on the United Arab Emirates
- Bahrain–Iran relations
