= 2026 Iranian strikes on Qatar =

- Part of the 2026 Iran war
- Map of Qatar
Date	28 February 2026 – present
Location	Qatar
Status	Ongoing

Belligerents
Iran	Qatar; United States; Defensive/precautionary: United Kingdom; Ukraine

Units involved
- See order of battle

Casualties and losses
(Iran) 2 Su-24 bombers shot down, 3 pilots captured	(Qatar) 1 civilian killed, 21 injured; (United States) 1 MQ-9 Reaper shot down (friendly fire)

Since the 2026 Iran war began with United States and Israeli strikes on Iran on 28 February 2026, following the breakdown of US-Iran talks and negotiations, locations across Qatar have been subject to Iranian missile strikes. Qatar's airspace was closed the day of the first strikes, disrupting flights from Hamad International Airport in the capital, Doha. One of those Iranian strikes targeted a Qatari liquefied natural gas facility in Ras Laffan, leading to a significant reduction in the country's LNG export capacity by nearly 17 percent for 3–5 years.

== Background ==
=== Iran–Qatar relations ===
Among Gulf Arab countries, Qatar is unique in having maintained a friendly relationship with Iran in recent decades. They share the world's largest gas field, which is the source of 80% of Qatari government revenues. Prior to the war, Qatar was producing more than 9 times as much from the joint field than the much larger Iran.

In 2010, Qatar and Iran signed a defense cooperation agreement and an internal security pact, and held joint military trainings. Meetings were held between the then-emir of Qatar, Hamad bin Khalifa Al Thani and both the President of Iran, Mahmoud Ahmadinejad, and its supreme leader, Ali Khamenei, exchanging pledges of cooperation and friendship.

One of the demands made by fellow Sunni Arab states to Qatar during the 2017 diplomatic crisis was to reduce its ties with Iran, but, following strong material and diplomatic support from Iran throughout the crisis, ties only strengthened.

In 2020, following the assassination of Qasem Soleimani, Emir Tamim bin Hamad Al Thani met Supreme Leader Ali Khamenei in Tehran, discussing the "existing friendship between the two countries" and various other issues.

Qatar has also acted as a central mediator between Iran and Western countries, including mediating a 2023 deal between it and the United States which saw the release of five prisoners in each country and the unfreezing of US$6 billion of Iranian funds.

=== Previous incidents ===
During the Twelve-Day War in June 2025, Iran struck a US base in the country. Iranian officials reportedly gave Qatar advance notice of the attack before launching it, which was intended to minimize damage and allow for de-escalation.

=== Start of the conflict ===
In late February 2026, the United States and Israel launched strikes on Iran to target strategic facilities and core government officials, starting the 2026 Iran war. The airstrikes were announced by US President Donald Trump shortly after, who stated that the operation was intended to impair the Iranian nuclear program and initiate a regime change following unsuccessful talks immediately prior. Iran retaliated shortly after, striking nations across the Persian Gulf, including Qatar and its close neighbors Bahrain, Saudi Arabia and the United Arab Emirates.

== Incidents ==
=== Iranian strikes ===
On 28 February 2026, 16 people were injured by shrapnel following the interception of an Iranian missile barrage by Qatari air defenses. According to the head of Qatar's Ministry of the Interior, 66 missiles were fired in total and there were over 100 reports of falling shrapnel across the nation. The Ministry later alerted the public of the attack.

On 2 March 2026, Qatari official Majed al-Ansari stated that a new wave of Iranian missiles that targeted locations such as the Hamad International Airport were intercepted, while announcing that Qatar would not engage with Iran. The same day, the Ministry of Defence in Qatar said that Qatari F-15s had downed two Su-24 bombers from Iran and intercepted multiple drone and missile strikes. Anonymous sources told CNN that the Su-24 targeted al-Udeid Air Base and Ras Laffan Industrial City, and that the aircraft were two minutes away from reaching Qatari territory when they were downed. A search was underway to recover the crew. This was the first air-air kill for the QEAF. According to a post on social media, footage of the wreckage of one of the attacking Su-24s was released by Al Jazeera on 10 April. A UK Royal Air Force Typhoon shot down an attack drone directed at Qatar. That same day, the Qatari Ministry of Defense announced that Ras Laffan Industrial City and Mesaieed Industrial Area were struck by two Iranian drones, though later satellite imagery analysis by both Bloomberg and the Energy Economics and Society Research Institute in Tokyo found that the main gas facility at Ras Laffan appeared to have not been damaged in this instance. In August, Iran claimed that Qatar was holding the three captured pilots of the downed Su-24s and preventing any communication to their families or Iranian authorities.

On 3 March, an Iranian missile struck Al Udeid Air Base, but did not cause any casualties.

On 11 March, Qatar said that they intercepted Iranian missiles and drones overnight.

On 18 March, Iran launched strikes targeting and hitting Qatar's massive natural gas facility. Following this attack, Qatar ordered Iran's military and security attaches, along with their staff, to leave the country within 24 hours.

On 1 April, Iran fired three cruise missiles on Qatar. According to Qatari Ministry of Defences, two missiles were intercepted while the third one hit an oil tanker. No casualties were reported.

=== Rejected claims of retaliatory strikes by Qatar ===
On 3 March 2026, Channel 12 (Israel) and various western media outlets reported that Qatar participated in strikes on Iran following Iranian attempts to directly strike Doha's airport. Majed al-Ansari denied that Qatar had joined the "campaign targeting Iran".

=== IRGC cell arrests ===
On 4 March 2026, Qatar said it had arrested 10 people suspected of being linked to the Islamic Revolutionary Guard Corps of Iran, claiming that they uncovered two cells that were "operating on behalf" of the IRGC. Seven were alleged to have been tasked with spying while the other three were said to be assigned to carry out "acts of sabotage" and were trained in the use of drones.

=== Friendly fire incident ===
On 5 March, US officials reported that at some point during the previous days an American MQ-9 Reaper drone was shot down "by what was believed to be friendly fire from the Qataris".

=== Boat incident ===
On 28 June, Qatar confirmed that a Qatari national was killed and an Egyptian national was injured by shrapnel during 'military operations in the area' after their vessel went missing and was later found. This occurred on the same day that Iranian drones were launched against US sites in Kuwait and Bahrain.

== Impact ==
=== Airspace closures ===
According to the Associated Press, Doha's Hamad International Airport experienced disruptions following the closure of Qatari airspace on 28 February 2026. Flight cancellations were reported as a result, and countries such as Israel and the United Arab Emirates closed their respective airspaces the same day. On 7 March, the Qatar Civil Aviation Authority (QCAA) announced a reopening of air navigation under limited emergency conditions, allowing for passenger evacuation and cargo flights, with standard commercial flights remaining suspended.

=== Disruptions in energy market ===
On 2 March, soon after the reported drone attack on Qatar's gas facilities in Ras Laffan and Mesaieed, QatarEnergy announced that it has ceased all production of natural gas and its associated products, reportedly on order by Energy Minister Saad Sherida al-Kaabi. It later announced that it was declaring Force Majeure on its contracts with buyers, and internal sources according to Reuters said that it would soon be shutting down gas liquefication, and that restarting it would take weeks. These announcements caused sharp increases in world gas prices, which analysts said was a part of Iran's plan to apply pressure on the world to stop the war. On 6 March, al-Kaabi warned that if the war continues other Gulf energy producers may be forced to halt exports and declare Force Majeure, and that "this will bring down economies of the world". The events caused a jump in global oil and gas prices. Singapore and Bangladesh sought replacements for the Qatari Force Majeure. LNG carrier rates went from $42,000 on 25 February, to over a quarter million dollars by 5 March, and then dropped rapidly as Qatari LNG carriers went unused in the Atlantic Ocean.

On 6 March, it was reported that according to satellite imagery analysis by both Bloomberg and the Energy Economics and Society Research Institute in Tokyo, Ras Laffan, the main gas facility in Qatar, appears to have not been damaged before the "unprecedented shutdown" which sent fuel prices higher.

Following an Iranian strike on Ras Laffan on 18 March, Energy Minister Saad Sherida al-Kaabi said that 17% of Qatar's LNG exports have been disrupted, causing damage that could take 3–5 years to repair and huge financial losses.

=== Arrests for insults to state and "spreading misleading information and rumours" ===
On 7 March, the Ministry of Interior announced the arrest of "a person of Arab nationality after he posted a series of tweets on one of his social media accounts that contained direct insults toward the State of Qatar and its institutions". On the same day, the ministry warned the public to "comply with the laws and regulations and to refrain from using social media or digital platforms to spread rumors, incite unrest, defame the State of Qatar and its institutions", and called on the public to "report any such behavior". On 9 March, it announced that 313 foreigners had been arrested for having "filmed and circulated video clips and published misleading information and rumours that could stir public opinion".

=== Reactions ===
==== Domestic ====
The Qatari Ministry of Foreign Affairs denounced the strikes, calling them a "reckless and irresponsible" violation of Qatar's sovereignty. A spokesperson from the Foreign Affairs ministry stated that Qatar has the authority to respond "in accordance with international law".

On 19 March, Qatar declared members of the Iranian military and security forces as 'persona non grata', giving them 24 hours to leave the country. Following international reports, in April 2026, Qatar denied reports it is paying Iran not to attack the country.

==== International ====
CBC News, citing the Canadian Department of National Defence's website, reported that Canadian soldiers of the Combined Aerospace Operations Centre were present at the Al Udeid Air Base in Qatar at the time of the attack. On 3 March 2026, Canadian Defence Minister David McGuinty confirmed Canadian military presence in the Middle East and confirmed that they had not suffered any casualties. McGuinty also stated that the Canadian Armed Forces will "assess any potential impacts on CAF personnel in the region."

British prime minister Keir Starmer denounced the 18 March Iranian attack on the natural gas facility in Qatar.

== See also ==
- 2026 Iranian strikes on Bahrain
- 2026 Iranian strikes on Jordan
- 2026 Iranian strikes on Kuwait
- 2026 Iranian strikes on Oman
- 2026 Iranian strikes on Saudi Arabia
- 2026 Iranian strikes on the United Arab Emirates
- Israeli attack on Doha
