= Qatar strike =

Qatar strike may refer to:

- 2025 Iranian strikes on Al Udeid Air Base
- Israeli attack on Doha
- 2026 Iranian strikes on Qatar
