= Fujairah Open =

- 2026 Fujairah Open

ATP Challenger Tour
- Location: Fujairah, United Arab Emirates
- Category: ATP Challenger Tour
- Surface: Hard

The Fujairah Open is a professional tennis tournament played on hardcourts. It is currently part of the ATP Challenger Tour. It was first held in Fujairah, United Arab Emirates in 2026. Two editions of the tournament were originally scheduled to take place in 2026 but were ultimately canceled due to safety concerns related to the 2026 Iran war.

== Past finals ==
=== Singles ===
Year	Champion	Runner-up	Score
2026 (1)	Cancelled in the qualifying rounds due to safety concerns		
2026 (2)	Cancelled due to safety concerns		

=== Doubles ===
Year	Champions	Runners-up	Score
2026 (1)	Cancelled due to safety concerns		
2026 (2)	Cancelled due to safety concerns		
