= 2026 Fujairah Open =

- Date: 2 – 8 March (scheduled); 2 – 3 March (actual)
- Edition: 1st
- Surface: Hard
- Location: Fujairah, United Arab Emirates
- Fujairah Open

The 2026 Fujairah Open was a professional tennis tournament played on hard courts. It was the first edition of the tournament which was part of the 2026 ATP Challenger Tour. It took place in Fujairah, United Arab Emirates between 2 and 3 March 2026 before being canceled due to safety concerns related to the 2026 Iran war.

== Singles main-draw entrants ==
=== Seeds ===
Country	Player	Rank^{1}	Seed
RSA	Lloyd Harris	152	1
AUS	Jason Kubler	206	2
AUS	James McCabe	213	3
CHN	Zhou Yi	225	4
POR	Frederico Ferreira Silva	240	5
JPN	Rio Noguchi	244	6
CHN	Sun Fajing	267	7
FRA	Sascha Gueymard Wayenburg	268	8

- ^{1} Rankings are as of 23 February 2026.

=== Other entrants ===
The following players received wildcards into the singles main draw:

- (South Korea) Chung Hyeon
- (Australia) Cruz Hewitt
- (United Kingdom) Zach Stephens

The following players received entry into the singles main draw through the Junior Accelerator programme:

- (Bulgaria) Ivan Ivanov
- (Germany) Max Schönhaus

The following player received entry into the singles main draw through the Next Gen Accelerator programme:

- (France) Thomas Faurel

The following players received entry into the singles main draw as alternates:

- (United Kingdom) Max Basing
- (Japan) Yuta Shimizu
- (South Korea) Shin San-hui

The following players received entry from the qualifying draw:

- (Ukraine) Vladyslav Orlov
- (Chinese Taipei) Wu Tung-lin
