= United Arab Emirates in the 2026 Iran war =

- Part of the 2026 Iran war
Date	28 February 2026 – present (8 months, 1 week and 1 day)
Location	United Arab Emirates, Iran
Status	Ongoing; Ceasefire since 8 April 2026

Belligerents
Iran	United Arab Emirates; United States; Bahrain; Kuwait; Israel; Defensive/precautionary: United Kingdom; Australia; Ukraine; France; Egypt

Units involved
- See order of battle

Casualties and losses
	(United Arab Emirates) UAE: 2 service members killed 1 civilian contractor killed 5 service members wounded 1 helicopter lost
- 12 civilians killed, 240 injured

At around 12:53 p.m. on 28 February 2026, following the coordinated 2026 United States–Israeli strikes on Iran, the Islamic Republic of Iran launched a multiday series of missile and drone airstrikes on the United Arab Emirates. As of 10 May 2026, the UAE has intercepted and destroyed 551 ballistic missiles, 2,265 drone attacks and 29 cruise missiles fired from Iran by using an integrated air defense system that includes Skynight, THAAD, Patriot, KM-SAM, Barak-8, and Pantsir-S1 missile defence systems. The attacks have killed a total of 15 people, including two military personnel, one civilian contractor (in Bahrain), and injured 245 people (5 of which in Bahrain).

According to the Wall Street Journal, the UAE responded with strikes on Iranian infrastructure using warplanes and drones, which included the Lavan Island attack. The UAE has faced more Iranian drone and missile attacks than any other country since 2026 Iran war began on 28 February 2026. According to CNN, Iran has fired approximately 2,500 missiles and drones at the United Arab Emirates during its attacks.

== Background ==
Following the high tensions and military conflict that began during late 2023, the ongoing tensions between Iran and the US, the reinstatement of economic sanctions and Iran and the 2025–2026 Iranian protests and massacres, the U.S. initiated a military buildup in the Middle East, with the aim for regime change in Iran. On 28 February, joint U.S.–Israeli strikes were launched against Iran, targeting its leaders and main military infrastructures and air defense systems. In retaliation, Iran launched ballistic missiles and drones against U.S. bases and other targets in several Arab countries across West Asia that included the UAE, Bahrain, Oman, Qatar, Kuwait, Saudi Arabia, and Israel.

== Attacks ==
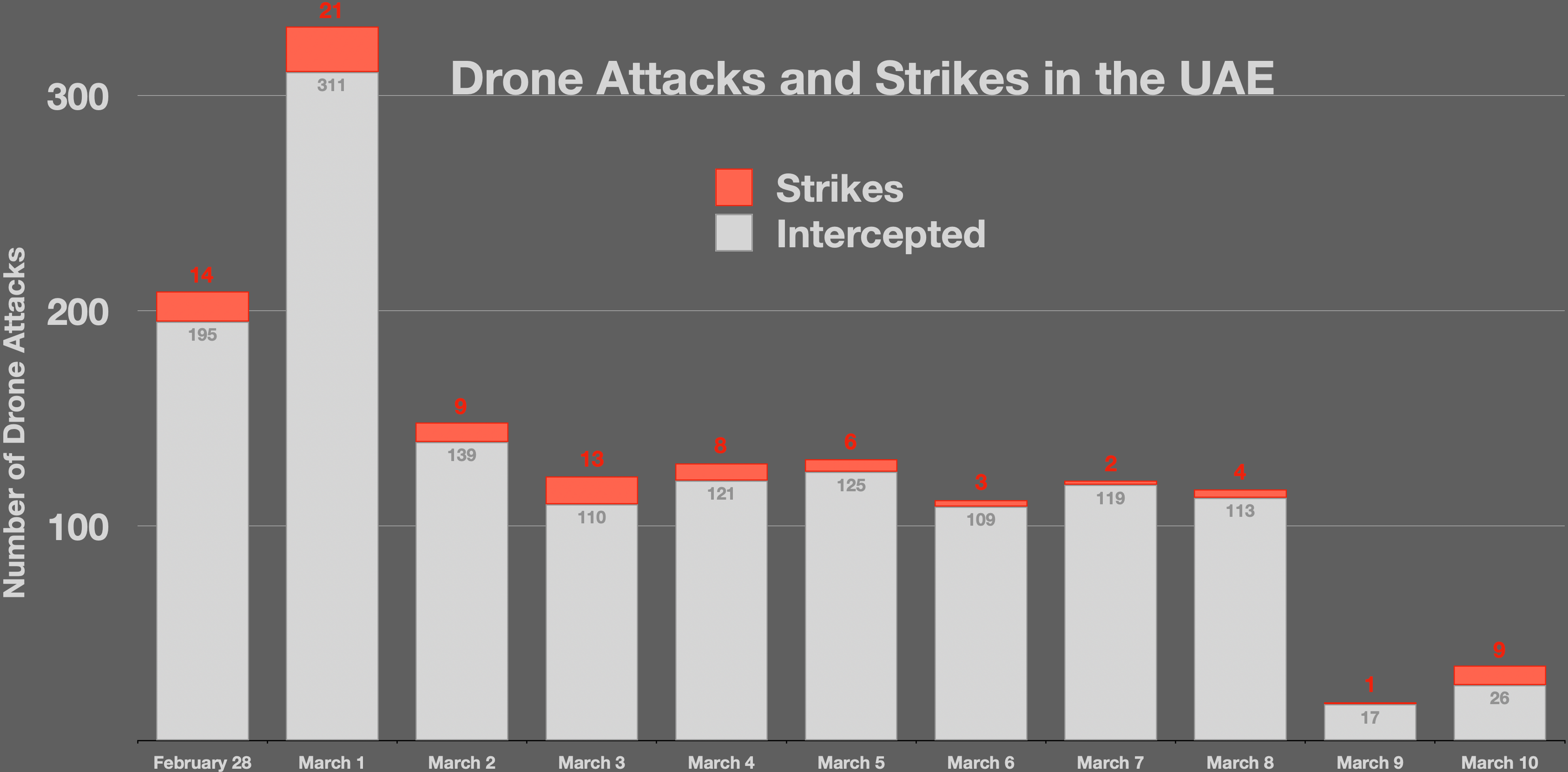
Drone attacks and strikes in the United Arab Emirates from 28 February to 10 March

External videos
- US consulate in Dubai hit by suspected Iranian drone
- Iranian Strikes Hit Dubai Airport
- Luxury Dubai hotel on fire

As of 10 May 2026, the UAE has intercepted and destroyed 551 ballistic missiles, 2,265 drones and 29 cruise missiles. Most of the missiles and drones were intercepted by UAE air defences. Even though most of them were destroyed, interception debris and falling projectiles fell on populated areas in Abu Dhabi and Dubai causing damage to civilian infrastructure and starting fires.

Iran launched the first wave of ballistic missiles and drones toward US bases in Abu Dhabi, including Al Dhafra Air Base. UAE defences intercepted most, but debris fell in a residential area near Zayed International Airport, killing one civilian (a Pakistani national) and injuring seven others from shrapnel and blasts. Loud explosions shook the Corniche, Al Dhafra, and Bateen districts, with smoke rising over the city. This strike targeted US forces at Al Dhafra, causing minor structural damage to base facilities from secondary explosions.

=== 1 March ===
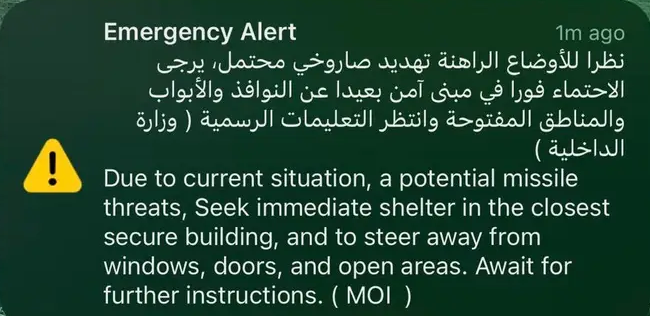
An emergency alert sent to residents of the United Arab Emirates shortly before Dubai International Airport was struck at around 12:30 a.m. local time on 1 March

During the morning of March 1st, Dubai International Airport was struck by an Iranian drone, leading to four civilians being injured and the airport being evacuated. The airport sustained minor damage and emergency teams were deployed. Dubai’s media office identified the injured civilians as four Dubai airport staff. Videos were later posted on social media at around 1:30 AM local time, indicating that the airport was struck in Dubai International Terminal 3 resulting in minor injuries to multiple people and causing damage inside the airport. A fire also broke out at the Jebel Ali Port, which the Dubai government attributed to debris from the "aerial interception" of an Iranian attack. French naval air base Camp de la Paix near Zayed Port in Abu Dhabi was also struck by drones.

AWS reported that, at 4:30 AM Pacific Standard Time (4:30 PM Gulf Standard Time), one of its data centres in mec1-az2 was on fire after being struck by 'objects' and the power was then shut down. Later that day, AWS reported 'localised power issues' in az3.

=== 2 March ===
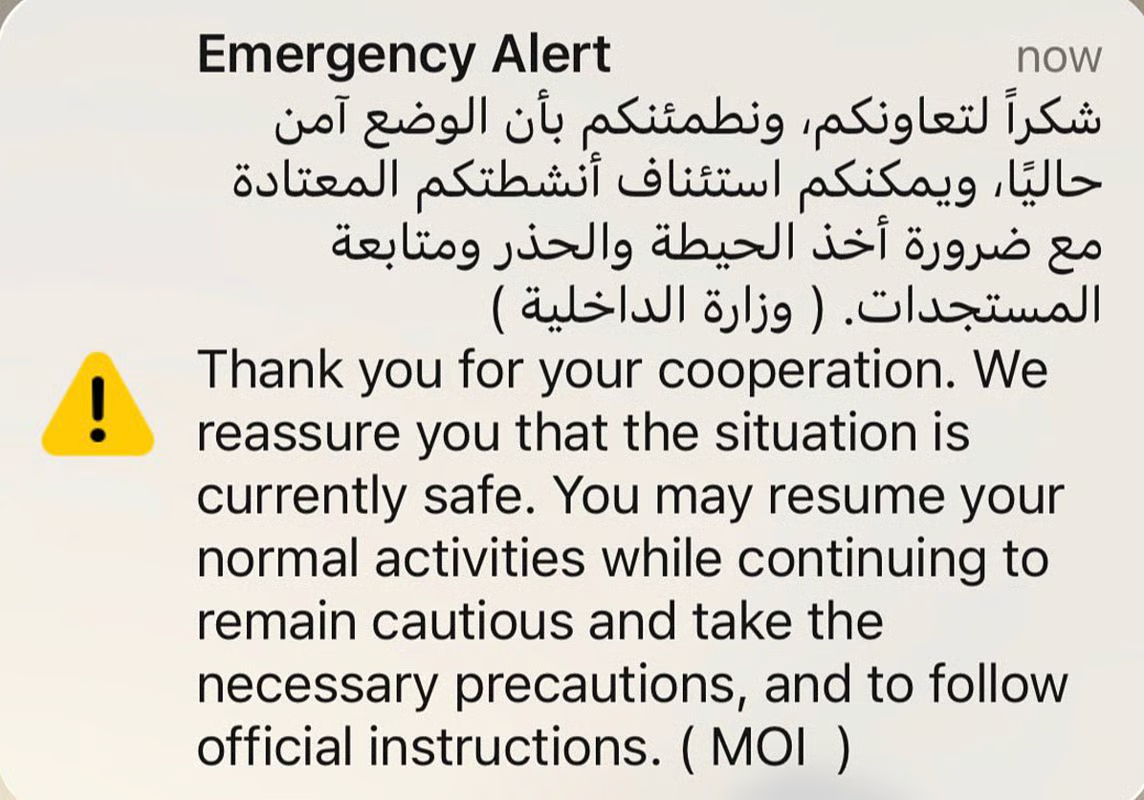
An EAS warning sent out to residents in the UAE confirming safety.

On 2 March, UAE Defence Ministry reported the extent of its operations facing Iran. The Ministry updated its interception figure to 174 ballistic missiles tracked (161 intercepted and 13 falling to the sea) and 689 detected drones (645 intercepted) plus eight cruise missiles which struck the country. Educational institutions shifted to remote learning. France deployed Rafale jets to protect its bases following the attacks at Camp de la Paix and Al Dhafra. An Iranian drone strike on the United States consulate in Dubai caused a fire to break out. The government's media office claimed to have contained it with no injuries. At approximately near midnight of 3 March, explosions were heard in a US consulate. Authorities said that a limited fire broke out in the consulate following a drone targeting operation, and was quickly contained with no injuries. Ship refuelling slowed at Fujairah after debris from a drone interception fell in the area of the Fujairah Free Zone. Debris from drone interceptions rained down on ships off the coast of Fujairah, causing damage. Two oil storage tanks that were severely damage in Fujairah were burning and releasing dark plumes of smoke into the sky, while another had burned.

=== Second week (7 March – 13 March) ===
Dubai International Airport briefly closed after an unidentified object was intercepted in the area, causing smoke to rise from the airport. Smoke and fire was seen rising from the 23 Marina tower in the Dubai Marina after being hit by an Iranian projectile . A Pakistani national was confirmed to have died in Dubai after falling debris struck a vehicle in the Al Barsha area of the city. The Ministry of Defence released footage of the military destroying and intercepting Iranian drones targeting the UAE. An Emirati helicopter was lost in a crash that killed two servicemembers on 9 March, according to the Ministry of Defense of the UAE. The UK also confirmed that it had begun "defensive air sorties" in the UAE. Dubai International Airport closed briefly while passengers and staff were directed to bomb shelters after defence systems alerted of incoming missile and drone attacks. Australia said it would send a Boeing E-7 Wedgetail EWACS aircraft and missiles to the UAE but would not deploy troops. UAE air defences reported that it intercepted multiple ballistic missiles and drones. A fire broke out at the Ruwais Industrial Complex in Abu Dhabi, which houses the country's largest oil refinery as a result of an Iranian drone strike. The fire caused Abu Dhabi National Oil Company (ADNOC) to shut off its refinery, a facility that would otherwise produce 922,000 barrels of oil per day. A drone strike in the area of the Dubai International Airport resulted in the severe injuries of four people of Ghanaian, Indian, and Bangladeshi nationalities. Australia closed its embassy in Abu Dhabi, and its consulate in Dubai. A tower in the area of Dubai Creek Harbour was hit with a drone attack, causing a fire. UAE said that they intercepted many Iranian missiles and drones on 11 March. A minor incident involving a drone was reported in the Al Bada'a neighborhood of Dubai. There were no injuries. The Dubai International Financial Centre Innovation Hub experienced an impact, causing damage to the facade of a building. No injuries were reported.

=== Third week (14 March – 20 March) ===
A drone strike impacted the Port of Fujairah, triggering fires and the suspension of some oil-loading operations. Debris fall was also recorded, although no casualties were reported. The UAE Interior Ministry warned of a missile threat and advised residents to stay safe. According to the defence minister, the UAE destroyed four ballistic missiles and six drones. A drone attack at Dubai International Airport which hit a fuel tank caused a fire, which resulted in temporary suspension of flights. It also led to the temporary close of roads near the airport. Some flights were redirected to Al Maktoum International Airport. The fire was extinguished later in the day. It was the third incident at the airport since Iran began striking the country on 28 February. Emirates Airlines resumed limited operations at 10:00 local time. In Al Bahyan, Abu Dhabi, a missile hit a civilian car; a Palestinian national was killed. The Fujairah Oil Industry Zone was hit by a drone, causing a fire. A drone attack on a building in Umm Al Quwain caused a fire. A drone strike to Abu Dhabi's Shah oil field caused a fire. The Ministry of Education and the Ministry of Higher Education and Scientific Research announced that educational institutions in the country would continue with distance learning for two weeks after the opening of schools and universities on 23 March. The Federal Authority for Government Human Resources also announced employees of government institutions who were primary caregivers could work remotely. The Fujairah Oil Industry Zone was hit by drones, resulting in a fire. A Pakistani national was killed in Baniyas from debris from an intercepted ballistic missile. The Ministry of Defense intercepted ballistic missiles and drones from Iran. Authorities announced that all aerial interception operations were carried out successfully. The UAE intercepted missiles intended to hit the Habshan gas and oil fields. Facilities were subsequently closed temporarily. The Ministry of Foreign Affairs deemed the incident a terrorist attack and violation of international law. UAE issue in the morning urgent missile alerts as Iran continued targeting its energy sites in Habshan in Abu Dhabi.

=== Fourth week (21 March – 27 March) ===
Three days later, the UAE Defence Ministry said it tracked incoming attacks of missiles and drones from Iran. Earlier it was reported that in Abu Dhabi an Indian national was injured from debris. The Iranian Revolutionary Guards also released a video supposedly showing that they were sending missiles and drones at a US base in the UAE. Two people—an Indian and a Pakistani—were killed and three others of Jordanian and Indian nationalities were severely injured in Abu Dhabi as a result of shrapnel from an intercepted missile.

=== Fifth week (28 March – 3 April) ===
Emirates Global Aluminium reported that its Al Taweelah site sustained significant damage during Iranian missile and drone attacks at Khalifa Economic Zone, Abu Dhabi, injuring six people. The company said it could take them a year to restore their production. The strike lead to an operational shutdown and repairs which are expected to take up to one year. The UAE Ministry of Defense said it intercepted 16 ballistic missiles and 42 drones launched from Iran. According to the news report, since the war began UAE air defences engaged a total of 414 ballistic missiles, 15 cruise missiles, and 1,914 UAVs Abdullah bin Zayed condemned the Iranian attacks which have been causing damage to civilian infrastructure and facilities. According to the Ministry of Defence it intercepted 11 ballistic missiles and 27 drones launched from Iran on 30 March. A Kuwaiti crude tanker off the coast of Dubai caught fire after it was hit by an Iranian drone. No injuries were reported, but the tanker was damaged. According to the Ministry of Defense, it engaged eight ballistic missiles, four cruise missiles, and 36 drones launched from Iran on 31 March, that injured four people in a residential community in southern Dubai and caused property damage. According to the Umm Al Quwain Government Media Office, one person of Indian nationality was severely injured from an intercepted drone, that fell in an industrial building in the Umm Al Thaoub area. A Bangladeshi national was killed by missile debris on a farm in the Fujairah region. The UAE Ministry of Defense said it intercepted 5 ballistic missiles and 35 UAVs launched from Iran on 1 April 2026. According to the report, since the start of the conflict, UAE air defences have engaged a total of 438 ballistic missiles, 19 cruise missiles, and 2,012 UAVs. On 2 April, the IRGC said that it targeted an Oracle data centre in Dubai. On 3 April, debris from a successful missile interception caused damage to KEZAD (Khalifa Economic Zones Abu Dhabi) as well as gas facilities in Habshan and Ajban, which injured 12 people in Ajban and killed an Egyptian national and injured 4 others in the Habshan gas facilities, following drone and missile attacks which significantly damaged the facility. The UAE Ministry of Defence said it intercepted 18 ballistic missiles, 4 cruise missiles, and 47 UAVs launched from Iran on 3 April 2026. According to the report, since the start of the conflict, UAE air defences have engaged a total of 475 ballistic missiles, 23 cruise missiles, and 2,085 UAVs.

=== Sixth week (4 – 8 April) ===
On 4 April 2026, the UAE Ministry of Defence said it had intercepted 23 ballistic missiles and 56 UAVs launched from Iran which resulted in debris landing on the facade of a residential tower in the marina area with no significant fires or injuries reported.The Oracle building was also targeted which resulted in minor damage with no injuries reported. After an interception in the Musaffah area, a Ghanaian national was moderately injured. A du telecom building in Fujairah was also attacked with drones, which resulted in a small fire with no injuries reported . The defence ministry also stated that since the beginning of the war, it has intercepted 23 cruise missiles, 498 ballistic missiles, and 2,141 drones. On 5 April, it was reported that multiple fires at Borouge petrochemicals plant were caused by debris from successful interceptions. On 6 April, Iran launched missiles and drones against the UAE, that activated its air defence, a Ghanaian national got injured from shrapnel after a successful air defence interception. The UAE reported having intercepted 12 ballistic missiles, two cruise missiles, and 19 UAVs on 6 April, also announcing four civilian injuries. Later in the day an Iranian drone targeted a telecom building in Fujairah and Sharjah . Ministry of Defense reports interception of 1 ballistic missile and 11 drones on 7 April.

=== Post-ceasefire ===
On 8 April, despite the US-Iran ceasefire agreement, UAE reported that its air defences are intercepting Iranian missiles and drones. According to the report Iran launched 17 ballistic missile and 35 UAVs. At the Habshan gas complex, two Emiratis and one Indian were injured by debris from an interception. Drones and missiles also attacked an oil terminal in Fujairah causing damage and fires, with no injuries reported.

Iran accused the UAE of launching attacks on a refinery of the National Iranian Oil Refining and Distribution Company on Lavan Island just after the ceasefire on 8 April. Some military analysts and Iranian state media identified United Arab Emirates Air Force Mirage 2000 fighter jets as having launched the attack, and while the UAE confirmed that Mirage jets were scrambled to intercept Iranian drones, it did not confirm or deny reports that they attacked Lavan Island. In May 2026, The Wall Street Journal and other publications reported that the UAE had launched strikes on Iran, including the one on the oil refinery on Iran's Lavan Island, that had taken place in "early April around the time President Trump was announcing a ceasefire". Chinese Wing Loong II drones and French Dassault Mirage jets, both used by the UAE, were spotted over Iran by OSINT researchers.

On 4 May, Iran launched a small scale attack over the UAE. Three Indians were reported to have been injured in Fujairah.

== Damage ==
The Al Minhad Air Base was also attacked with drones and missiles launched from Iran. The air base is operated by the United Arab Emirates Air Force and the Royal Air Force. It is also home to Camp Baird, the Australian Defence Force Headquarters Middle East (HQME).

Reports indicated that a Shahed-type drone struck the Fairmont The Palm Hotel on Palm Jumeirah, causing a large explosion and fire. Four individuals were critically injured, primarily from debris and blast effects. The attack disrupted the luxurious district, with windows shattering in nearby buildings, a drone attack in the city walk area of Dubai caused a fire and damage which was later contained. The UAE said that it had intercepted a "new wave" of Iranian missiles and that "debris from the interceptions" had fallen in Abu Dhabi and Dubai, causing damage and fire to the lower floor of the Burj Al Arab hotel.

Fallen debris caused damage to structures in Dubai, including areas around Palm Jumeirah and other areas of Dubai. In the residential and commercial areas of Abu Dhabi and Dubai, debris had caused damage to properties killing several civilians and injuring multiple others.

The 23 Marina tower was also damaged on multiple occasions. On 1 March, Dubai International Airport was hit by debris from a fallen missile that caused multiple injuries, and a large fire that broke out on 16 March was caused by a drone attack that resulted in an oil tanker explosion.

== Casualties ==
In the strikes against the United Arab Emirates, 15 people were killed, including two Emirati military personnel, one Moroccan civilian contractor who was killed in Bahrain while working for the United Arab Emirates Armed Forces, and 12 other civilians who were foreign nationals from Pakistan, Bangladesh, Nepal, Palestine, India, and Egypt. 246 people from 31 nationalities were injured.

On 7 March, a Pakistani driver was killed. On 16 March, a Palestinian woman was killed in Al Bahyah in Abu Dhabi after a missile hit a civilian car. The following day, a Pakistani was killed in Baniyas due to debris from a ballistic missile. The two military personnel who were killed were aboard a helicopter that crashed during a malfunction on 9 March. A Bangladeshi national was killed by debris on 1 April.

=== Casualties in the United Arab Emirates by nationality ===
Nationality	Killed	Ref.
Pakistan	4	
India	3	
Bangladesh	2	
United Arab Emirates	2	
Egypt	1	
Morocco	1	
Nepal	1	
Palestine	1	
Total	15	

== Effects ==
Some expats have attempted to flee the country out of safety concerns while companies have also attempted to evacuate employees. Costs to flee the country by private jet were as high as $250,000 on 3 March 2026.

Many loud noises have been heard by residents and citizens in the cities of Dubai and Abu Dhabi. The government and many news outlets ensured the people that they were caused by successful interceptions.

Several reports were issued on the many pets being left abandoned in the streets of Dubai by fleeing expats. Local veterinarians and pet hospitals described being overwhelmed by the abandoned pets. Some pets were left tied to poles or stranded in the desert. Others were reported being euthanized.

There are some reports that the online posts of social media influencers in Dubai are being monitored. During the 2026 Iranian missile and drone attacks on the United Arab Emirates, authorities imposed strict restrictions on filming and sharing footage of the incidents. According to international media reports, several individuals, including foreign nationals, were arrested or charged for recording or disseminating videos of the strikes. Authorities also accused some tourists and journalists of "spreading panic" for sharing footage of the damage. Reports indicated that penalties for violations included fines, detention, or deportation. Twenty-one people were reportedly arrested in Dubai for violating the UAE cybercrime law after they filmed, shared, or posted content related to the attacks. Forty-five others were arrested in Abu Dhabi.

As bookings were cancelled and vacancies increased, hotels in Dubai slashed prices and offered discounts.

By early March, oil production in the UAE had dropped by between 500,000 and 800,000 barrels per day. The International Energy Agency's April oil market report stated that the UAE had pumped 2.4 million barrels/day in March, a decline of one-third from the 3.6 millions barrels/day in February, before the war started.

== Responses ==
=== United Arab Emirates ===
Officials from the United Arab Emirates condemned the attacks by Iran, calling them a "flagrant violation of national sovereignty and international law", while stating the country has a right to protect itself and its civilians. Safety measures were implemented including airspace closures and public safety advisories, and urged residents to rely on official sources for information. Following the ongoing attacks by Iran, the UAE closed its embassy in Tehran and withdrew its ambassador and all diplomatic staff. The UAE reasserted its right to self-defense, rejecting accusations by Iranian Foreign Minister Abbas Araghchi. A UAE official also stated that they would be open to mediation only if Iran stops the attacks.

In addition, the UAE revoked the operation licenses of five Iranian schools located in the UAE.

UAE President Mohamed bin Zayed Al Nahyan, together with Saudi Crown Prince Mohammed bin Salman, warned that continued Iranian attacks on other Gulf states may lead to a regional escalation.

Sultan Al Jaber, Chief Executive of ADNOC said that energy infrastructure has been targeted throughout the region, saying that it constitutes "global economic warfare." On 19 March the UAE Ministry of Foreign Affairs called the Iranian attacks as "Terrorist Attacks". UAE foreign minister Sheikh Abdullah bin Zayed Al Nahyan said that the UAE would not be "blackmailed by terrorists." UAE presidential adviser Anwar Gargash said that the war needs to end with a long-term solution for security in the Persian Gulf, and discouraged a ceasefire that will not accomplish that. Analysts argued that the strikes marked a permanent rupture in the UAE's strategic assumptions, with Gulf states facing a more dangerous and complex security environment after the war's conclusion than before it began, regardless of the ceasefire outcome. On 26 March 2026, the UAE along with other five Gulf countries (Saudi Arabia, Kuwait, Bahrain, Qatar, and Jordan) issued a joint condemnation about Iran and its affiliated armed groups in Iraq, attacks against countries in the region and their facilities and infrastructure. Yousef Al Otaiba, UAE ambassador to the US wrote in a March 2026 WSJ article, that the 2026 Iran war, is proof that the Iranian Revolution that took place 50 years ago is still a threat to global security and economy stability. To resolve this immense military threat Iran imposes, a conclusive solution must be implemented.

UAE Foreign Minister Sheikh Abdullah bin Zayed held a phone call with officials from Afghanistan, Angola, Iraq, and Kenya to discuss the response to the Iranian attacks.

On 28 March, the UAE announced that it was beginning to revoke residency permits for Iranian nationals. On 31 March, the UAE arrested dozens of IRGC-linked money changers.

Anwar Gargash said that any deal with Iran would need to include guarantees that Iran would not attack again and reparations for the damage that they caused.

On 19 April, the UAE held initial talks with the US about the possibility of receiving financial support from the US if the Iran war continues to strain the UAE's economy.

=== Iran ===
According to reports citing senior Iranian security sources in March 2026, Tehran alleges the United Arab Emirates played an active role in the US-Israeli war against Iran from its inception. Iran concluded that UAE actions went beyond hosting US military facilities, which had already been targeted by Iranian forces.

In a leaked message, former Iranian foreign minister Mohammad Javad Zarif supported the strikes on the UAE, saying that the United Arab Emirates and Israel are 'one and the same'. Tehran accused the UAE of being the launch point of the US attack on Kharg Island on 13 March, urging an evacuation of three ports in the UAE in preparation for its response.

Ali Larijani rebuked Islamic countries - particularly the UAE - for "abandoning Iran" and siding with the US and Israel.

The Iranian ambassador to the United Nations wrote letters to the Security Council president and the UN secretary-general demanding reparations from Qatar for allowing its territory to be used for attacks on Iran.

In response to UAE revoking residency permits for Iranian nationals, Iran revoked residency permits for 1,200 UAE nationals, and ordered them to leave Iran within a week.

=== United States ===
In March 2026, Secretary of State Marco Rubio confirmed the US's commitment to the UAE's security.

=== United Kingdom ===
UK human rights ambassador Eleanor Sanders condemned Iranian missile and drone attacks on its neighboring countries.

=== European Union ===
On 14 April, European Council president Antonio Costa stated that the EU was trying to work with the UAE to restore stability to the region and open the Strait of Hormuz.

=== G7 ===
The foreign ministers of the G7 condemned Iran’s "unjustifiable" and "reckless" attacks on sites in the region.

=== BRICS ===
The 2026 Iran war exposed significant rifts within the expanded BRICS alliance, paralysing its ability to form a cohesive response or issue a joint statement. The direct involvement of members Iran and the UAE on opposing sides prevented consensus, exposing the limits of the bloc's political unity.

== Analysis ==
An analysis in Iran International suggests that the United Arab Emirates, along with Saudi Arabia, may be positioning themselves to for a more active role in fighting against Iran.

== See also ==
- Iran internal crisis (2025–present)
- Iran–United Arab Emirates relations
- Iran–Israel proxy conflict
- List of country-specific articles on the 2026 Iran war
