= Saudi Arabia in the 2026 Iran war =

2026 Iranian strikes on Saudi Arabia
- Part of the 2026 Iran war
- Saudi Arabia in the 2026 Iran war (Saudi Arabia)
Date	28 February 2026 – present
Location	Riyadh and Eastern Province, Saudi Arabia
Status	Ongoing; Ras Tanura oil refinery suffers damage; United States Embassy in Riyadh suffers damage; CIA station in Riyadh is struck by Iranian drones

Belligerents
Iran; Rijal al-Bas al-Shadid	Saudi Arabia; United States; Pakistan; Greece; Ukraine

Units involved
- See order of battle

Casualties and losses
Per Saudi Arabia: Iran: At least 10 drones and 2 cruise missiles intercepted	Per Saudi Arabia and US: Saudi Arabia: 3 civilians killed; 23 civilians injured; United States: 2 soldiers dead; 29 servicemembers wounded; 2 aircraft destroyed and 5 damaged

Since the 2026 Iran war began with United States and Israeli strikes on Iran on 28 February 2026, locations across Saudi Arabia have been subject to multiple retaliatory Iranian missile strikes. The strikes also targeted oil refineries in Saudi Arabia. In response, the Royal Saudi Air Force secretly carried out strikes on Iranian drone and missile-launch sites in Iran, and struck Iranian-backed militias in Iraq.

== Strikes ==
=== 28 February ===
Following Israeli–United States strikes on Iran, loud explosions were reported in the eastern regions of Riyadh, the capital of Saudi Arabia. The foreign ministry of Saudi Arabia condemned the attacks and claimed that the attacks were repulsed.

=== 1 March ===
Saudi Arabia intercepted missiles aimed at the Prince Sultan Air Base and the Riyadh airport without any material losses. Iranian forces launched a missile attack on a US base in Saudi Arabia, a US soldier died from injuries sustained eight days later.

=== 2 March ===
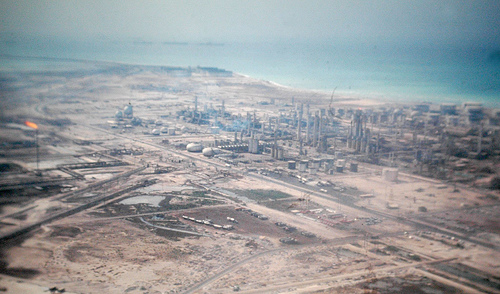
The Aramco Ras Tanura refinery from the air c. 1974

Saudi Arabia claimed to have intercepted two hostile drones aimed at the Ras Tanura oil refinery while a limited fire broke out due to falling shrapnel. The refinery is Saudi Arabia's largest domestic oil refinery, responsible for refining more than half a million barrels every day. Due to its position near the Persian Gulf, it also serves as a key export hub for Saudi Arabia's oil industry.

These strikes have caused significant global oil price increases, with strikes on oil depots and refinery facilities in the Strait of Hormuz impacting shipping through an area accounting for 20% of global oil and LNG supply.

With Iran declaring the Persian Gulf restricted to all nations except China, Saudi Arabia planned on using the Red Sea to export oil products such as propane or butane.

After a short period, Saudi Arabia began exporting part of their oil product outputs through Yanbu, a port city in the Medina Province that lies on the Red Sea. Aramco also announced the Ras Tanura refinery would reopen after about a week of being shut down. The refinery reopened on 13 March.

=== 3 March ===
The United States embassy in Riyadh was subject to an attack by two Iranian drones, which Saudi authorities confirmed and said had caused "limited fire and minor material damages." This came before the IRGC declared its intention to start destroying "American political centers" in the region, including the Riyadh embassy.

=== 4 March ===
The Aramco facility in Ras Tanura was hit for the second time by a projectile. A USMC Lance Corporal Kevin Melendez was reported dead in a non-hostile incident.

=== 8 March ===
An Iranian drone strike, which the IRGC said targeted radar systems, hit a residential building in Al-Kharj, killing two people of Indian and Bangladeshi nationalities and injuring another 12 people.

=== 9 March ===
Saudi Arabia said that its forces had destroyed four drones targeting Shaybah oil field.

=== 10 March ===
The Rijal al-Bas al-Shadid, a group affiliated with the Islamic Resistance in Iraq, launched rockets toward Prince Sultan Air Base in Saudi Arabia.

=== 12 March ===
Saudi Arabia intercepted a drone headed towards Shaybah oilfield.

=== 14 March ===
US officials told The Wall Street Journal that five U.S. Air Force refueling planes at Prince Sultan Air Base were struck and damaged by Iranian missiles in recent days. The Saudi Ministry of Defense said that it intercepted seven drones that were headed to Riyadh and the Eastern Province.

On 14 March, Formula One announced that the 2026 Saudi Arabian Grand Prix would not take place following the outbreak of the war.

=== 15 March ===
The Saudi Ministry of Defense said that it intercepted ten drones that were headed to Riyadh and the Eastern Province.

=== 18 March ===
The Saudi Ministry of Defense announced that it had intercepted a missile targeting Al-Kharj. No casualties were reported.

=== 19 March ===
The Saudi defense ministry said that a drone fell at the SAMREF refinery. Greek ‌defense minister Nikos Dendias said that Greek-operated Patriot systems intercepted and destroyed two Iranian ballistic missiles targeting Saudi oil refineries.

=== 21 March ===
Three missiles were aimed at Riyadh. Two of the three fell in an uninhabited area. Four drones were intercepted in the eastern region of Saudi Arabia.

=== 23 March ===
Saudi Ministry of Defense said missiles were fired from Iran, targeting Riyadh, one was intercepted while the other fell in inhabited are. The Iranian Revolutionary Guards also released a video supposedly showing that they were sending missiles and drones at a US base in Saudi Arabia.

=== 24 March ===
The Saudi Ministry of Defense said that it intercepted a ballistic missile headed towards the eastern region of the country.

=== 27 March ===
An Iranian missile strike on Prince Sultan Air Base destroyed and damaged several US refueling aircraft, including one Boeing E-3 Sentry and at least one KC-135 Stratotanker on the ground. According to U.S. officials, 29 US servicemen were wounded in attacks during the week.

=== 31 March ===
Saudi Arabia reported that six houses in Al-Kharj were lightly damaged from debris of intercepted drones.

=== 6 April ===
The Hellenic Army General Staff announced that Greek-operated Patriot systems intercepted a UAV.

=== 28 June ===
Two days after Aramco restarted operations at Ras Tanura after being halted from the 2026 Iran war, a Saudi Aramco helicopter crashed in Ras Tanura Airport, killing all 14 Saudi nationals onboard.

== Reactions ==
On 26 March 2026, Saudi Arabia along with the UAE, Kuwait, Bahrain, Qatar, and Jordan jointly condemned Iran and its affiliated armed groups in Iraq, and its attacks against countries in the region and their facilities and infrastructure. The Saudi cabinet stated that it will take all necessary measures to defend Saudi Arabia's security, territory, citizens, and residents. Saudi Arabia further condemned "Iran's attacks on civilian airports and oil infrastructure, calling them a violation of international law and a deliberate attempt to destabilize the region." As the attacks persisted, the Saudi foreign ministry warned that "if Iran presses ahead with its attacks, it would bear the heaviest diplomatic, economic, and strategic consequences, and be the biggest loser." It was reported that a Saudi Arabian arms company signed to buy interceptor missiles from Ukraine. Saudi Crown Prince Mohammed bin Salman, together with UAE President Mohamed bin Zayed Al Nahyan, warned that continued Iranian attacks on other Gulf states may lead to a regional escalation. On 21 March, Saudi Arabia expelled various Iranian defense officials, giving them 24 hours to leave the country.

- Pakistan: Pakistan's Foreign Minister stated that he reminded Iran of the mutual defense agreement they signed with Saudi Arabia in September 2025. After the ceasefire Pakistan sent 13,000 troops and fighter jets to Saudi Arabia.
- United Kingdom: Foreign Secretary Yvette Cooper condemned the Iranian strikes targeting Saudi Arabia, stating "Iranian strikes on Riyadh, including on the US embassy, are completely unacceptable. We condemn these reckless and destabilising attacks that target innocent civilians."
- United States: The United States Department of State ordered American employees and diplomats in Saudi Arabia to leave the country, citing safety risks.
- Greece: Prime Minister Kyriakos Mitsotakis called the interception of Iranian missiles by Greek-operated Patriot systems "strictly defensive" and part of a bilateral agreement with Saudi Arabia.
- G7: The foreign ministers of the G7 condemned Iran's "unjustifiable" and "reckless" attacks on sites in the region.

== Analysis ==
An analysis in Iran International suggests that Saudi Arabia, along with the United Arab Emirates, may be positioning themselves to for a more active role in fighting against Iran.

== See also ==
- 2026 Iranian strikes on Bahrain
- 2026 Iranian strikes on Kuwait
- 2026 Iranian strikes on the United Arab Emirates
- Iran–Saudi Arabia relations
- 1991 Iraqi ballistic missile attacks on Saudi Arabia
