= Jaysh al-Ghadab =

Militant group in Iraq

- جيش الغضب
- Other name: Army of Wrath
- Founded: February 25, 2026
- Dates active: 2026 — present
- Country: Iraq
- Allegiance: Axis of Resistance; Islamic Resistance in Iraq
- Wars: Iran–Israel conflict; Middle Eastern crisis (2023–present); 2026 Iran war; 2026 United States–Israeli conflict with pro-Iranian Iraqi militias; 2026 Iranian strikes on Bahrain; 2026 Iranian strikes on the Kurdistan Region; 2026 Iranian strikes on Kuwait
- Website: Telegram channel

Jaysh al-Ghadab (Arabic: جيش الغضب, lit. 'Army of Wrath') is a pro-Iranian Shia militant group in Iraq, affiliated with the Islamic Resistance in Iraq.

== History ==
=== Foundation ===
The Jaysh al-Ghadab was founded on February 25, 2026, declares itself militarily and electronically prepared to fight against the group enemies, the group is linked to Harakat Ansar Allah al-Awfiya.

=== Activities ===
On February 28, after the start of the 2026 Iran war, the group declared that its combatants were preparing for a "war of attrition that could be prolonged".

On March 20, the group attacked Camp Victory, near the Baghdad International Airport, with a drone strike.

On March 21, the group attacked US positions in Bahrain with drones.

On April 7, the group attacked "American and Israeli interests" in the Kurdistan Region, Kuwait and Bahrain, claiming the attack was carried out in revenge for the deaths of Ali Khamenei and Hassan Nasrallah.
