= 4th Combat Aviation Brigade =

Basic aviation formation of the 4th Infantry Division, US Army

Combat Aviation Brigade, 4th Infantry Divisiom
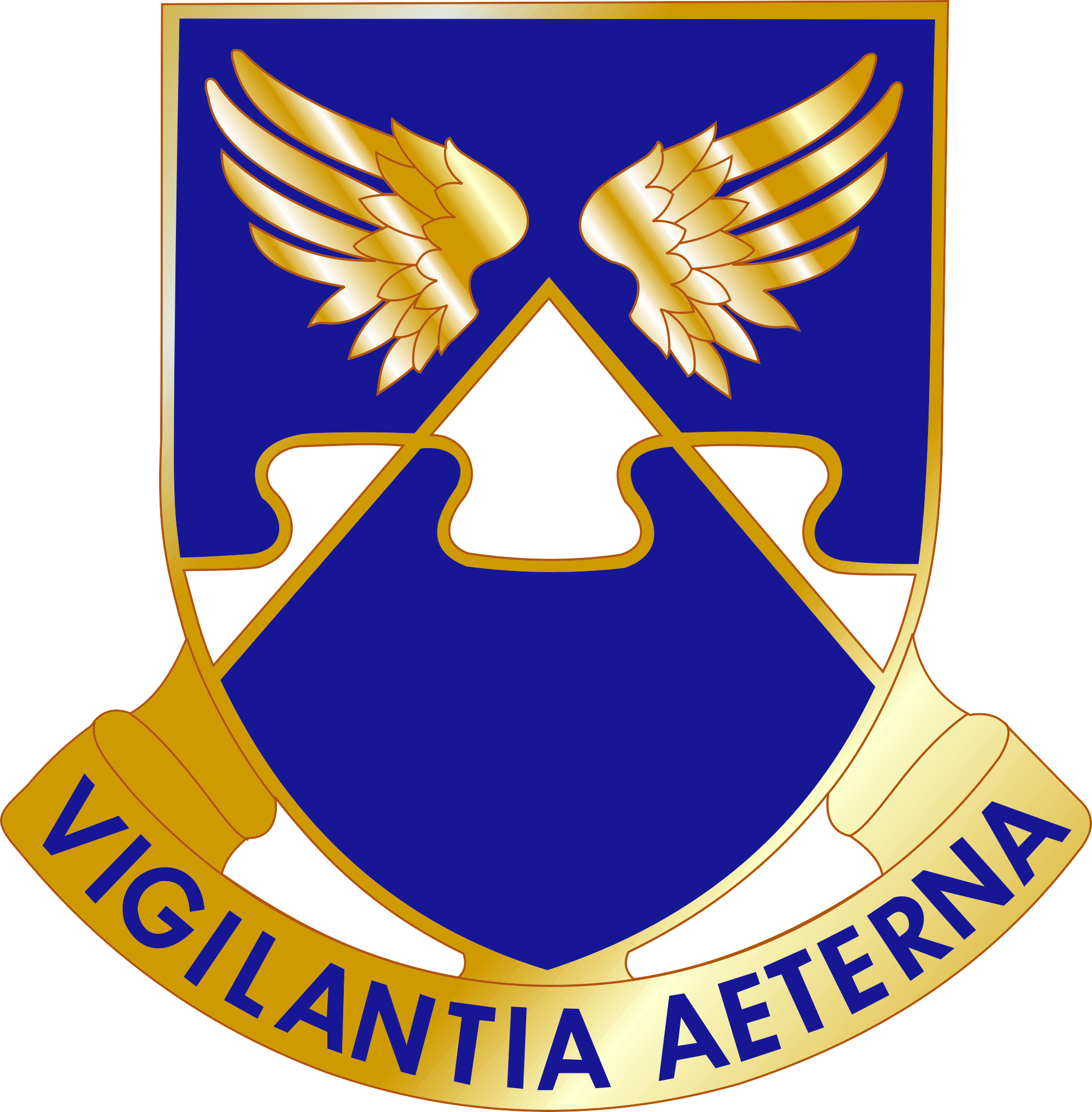
- Distinctive Unit Insignia
- Active: 1957 – present
- Country: United States
- Allegiance: United States Army
- Type: Aviation
- Size: Brigade
- Part of: 4th Infantry Division
- Nickname: Ivy Eagles

Insignia
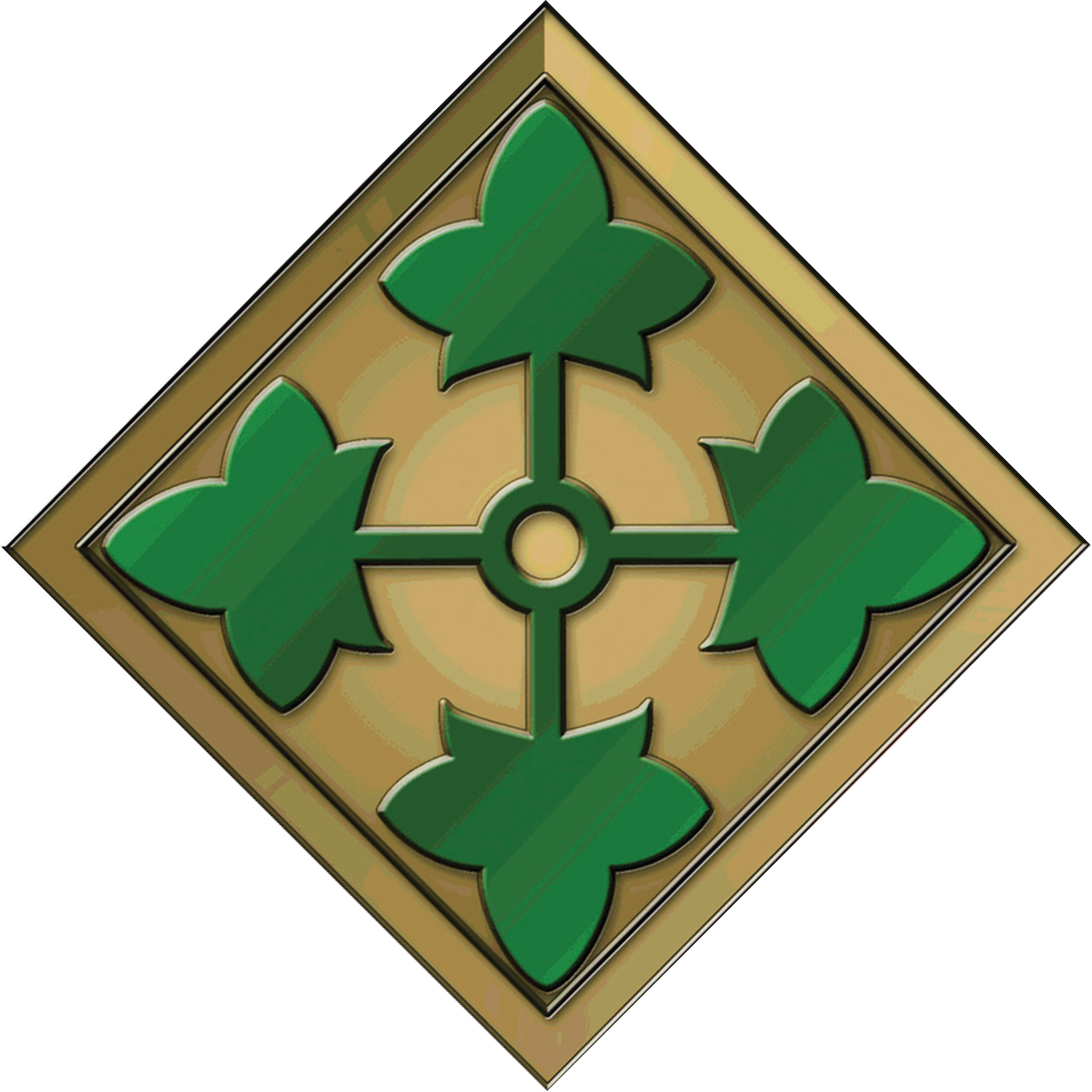
- 4th Infantry Division Shoulder Sleeve Insignia, worn by the brigade

The Combat Aviation Brigade, 4th Infantry Division is a Combat Aviation Brigade of the United States Army based at Fort Carson, Colorado.

== Structure ==
- 2nd Battalion (General Support), 4th Aviation Regiment (2nd General Support Battalion 4th Aviation Regiment)
- 3rd Battalion (Assault Helicopter), 4th Aviation Regiment (3rd Assault Helicopter Battalion 4th Aviation Regiment)
- 4th Battalion (Attack Reconnaissance), 4th Aviation Regiment (4th Attack Reconnaissance Battalion 4th Aviation Regiment)
- 404th Aviation Support Battalion (404th ASB)
