= Rijal al-Bas al-Shadid =

Pro-Iranian Shia militant group in Iraq

- رجال البأس الشديد
- Other name: Men of Extreme Might
- Founded: March 5, 2026
- Dates active: 2026 — present
- Country: Iraq
- Allegiance: Islamic Resistance in Iraq
- Ideology: Shiism
- Wars: Iran–Israel conflict; Middle Eastern crisis (2023–present); 2026 Iran war; 2026 United States–Israeli conflict with pro-Iranian Iraqi militias; Syria in the 2026 Iran war; 2026 Iranian strikes on Saudi Arabia; 2026 Iranian strikes on Jordan; 2026 Iranian strikes on the Kurdistan Region
- Website: Telegram channel

Rijal al-Bas al-Shadid (Arabic: رجال البأس الشديد, lit. 'Men of Extreme Might') is a pro-Iranian Shia militant group in Iraq, affiliated with the Islamic Resistance in Iraq.

== History ==
=== Activities ===
On March 5, the group made its first public appearance after claiming to have carried out 31 attacks against the "Zionist and American enemy".

On March 7, the group attacked Camp Victory and its C-RAM system in Baghdad, with 3 drones.

On March 6, the group claimed attacks on the Muwaffaq Salti Air Base in Jordan and an unspecified "vital target", with the Shahed-101 Kamikaze Drones. On the same day, the group attacked the Rmeilan base with two drones, in retaliation for the "Zionist-American aggression" in Iran. Also attacked the Ashti camp and a headquarters belonging to the Kurdistan Freedom Party in Erbil.

On March 10, the group launched rockets toward Prince Sultan Air Base in Saudi Arabia, during the 2026 Iranian strikes on Saudi Arabia.

On May 12, the group claimed 205 drone attacks, and threatens to escalate the attacks if the 2026 Iran war renews after the ceasefire.
