= 2026 strikes on Akrotiri and Dhekelia =

Strikes against British military base

- Part of the 2026 Iran war
- 2026 strikes on Akrotiri and Dhekelia (Cyprus)
| Date | 1 March 2026 – 4 March 2026 (3 days) |
| Location | Akrotiri and Dhekelia, Cyprus |
| Result | Majority of drone strikes intercepted: Damage to one hanger at RAF Akrotiri, followed by partial evacuation; Iran threatens to further attack Cyprus; Europe and Turkey mobilise and recommit to defending Cyprus; Increased tensions between the Republic of Cyprus and Northern Cyprus and between Greece and Turkey |

Belligerents
| Hezbollah (alleged) | United Kingdom; Akrotiri and Dhekelia; RAF Akrotiri; Defensive/precautionary: Cyprus; Greece; France; Germany; Italy; Netherlands; Spain; United States; Turkey; Northern Cyprus |

Strength
| | 500 British personeel 160 Italian marines |

Casualties and losses
| Per defensive coalition: 3 drones shot down by Greece and United Kingdom | Unknown |

On 1 March 2026 a loitering munition hit the RAF Akrotiri base on the island of Cyprus. Additional drones launched on 1 and 4 March towards Cyprus were intercepted. The attacks occurred during the broader war between Iran and both Israel and the United States. Cyprus' foreign affairs minister Constantinos Kombos claimed the drone was an Iranian-manufactured Shahed-type and launched from Lebanon. On 4 March F-16 fighters of the Hellenic Air Force intercepted two drones in Lebanese airspace headed towards Cyprus.

== Background ==
After Cyprus became an independent state in 1960, the British retained territorial control of two military bases on the island, thereby forming the British Overseas Territory of Akrotiri and Dhekelia. Militaries with a presence on Cyprus include Greece, Turkey and the United Kingdom.

Before the strikes in 2026, Cyprus was last targeted in 1986, when pro-Libyan militants attacked the British base at Akrotiri, injuring three British military dependents. Prior to that, Cyprus had last been attacked directly by a foreign country during the 1974 Turkish invasion that led to the partition of the island. As the broader Middle Eastern crisis enveloped the region in the 2020s, concerns about the Cypriot security situation also developed. At the time of the 2026 strikes, up to 300,000 British nationals were visiting or living in the Gulf region.

In June 2024 Hassan Nasrallah, then Secretary-General of Hezbollah, directly threatened to strike Cyprus if it was to be used by the Israeli military as a base to attack the group.

On 6 February 2026, amid heightened tensions in the region, the UK deployed six F-35 Lightning II jets to RAF Akrotiri, joining 10 Eurofighter Typhoons already at the base.

On 28 February Israel and the United States conducted airstrikes on Iran in the culmination of a two-month-long geopolitical crisis. In response, Iran began launching strikes against various regional countries in response. Initially, British prime minister Keir Starmer stated that the United Kingdom would not be involved in the conflict, denying American requests to use British military bases for the operation. British defence secretary John Healey refused to state whether the United Kingdom supported the Israeli-American attacks. As Iran's retaliation escalated, endangering regional British allies, assets and tourists, on 1 March at 21:00 (UTC), Britain agreed in a recorded statement to let the United States access these bases for strikes on Iranian missiles and launch sites, but excluded use for strikes on political and economic targets in Iran. Notably, the successful drone strike against RAF Akrotiri occurred before Starmer's announcement.

== Incidents ==
On 1 March at 22:03 (UTC) (2 March 0:03 local time, GMT+2) a drone struck the Royal Air Force (RAF) base at Akrotiri, hitting a hangar. The attack prompted a partial evacuation of the facility. Nikos Christodoulides, the president of Cyprus, stated that the Shahed-type aircraft caused minor damage. The president stated that the drone was Iranian. Later in the day, British forces intercepted two drones heading towards Cyprus.

On 4 March Larnaca International Airport was temporarily closed due to the sighting of an unidentified object. Two Greek F-16s were mobilised to investigate. The Greek F-16s intercepted two Iranian drones headed towards Cyprus that were in Lebanese airspace. Reports suggested a closure of Cypriot airspace, but it was later dismissed as false by the Cypriot government.

On 24 March an Iranian missile crashed in Lebanese territory, specifically in Keserwan after being intercepted before reaching its target. Multiple sources from the US military intel heavily suggest it was aimed at Cyprus. Israeli media also suggested this to be the case. Around the same time of the incident a Turkish F-16 temporarily took off from Northern Cyprus, but the reason of this remains unknown. On the same date Larnaca International Airport had also been temporarily closed after a radar detected "an unidentified aerial object" in the controlled airspace east of the airfield at 21:17 local time.

== Response ==
=== Military ===
Islamic Revolutionary Guard Corps (IRGC) General Sardar Jabbari claimed that the Americans had relocated most of their aircraft to Cyprus, declaring that RAF Akrotiri is "in the frame" now that the UK has let Donald Trump's US Air Force land there, and that they would "launch missiles at Cyprus with such intensity that the Americans will be forced to leave the island."

Although Cyprus is not a NATO member, Akrotiri and Dhekelia, as a British Overseas Territory in the North Atlantic, can invoke the North Atlantic Treaty's Article 4 on consultations or Article 5 on mutual defence. No dedicated discussion was held among the NATO members over the incident, which has been considered minor, but on 3 March 2026, NATO Secretary General Mark Rutte said that the alliance will "defend every inch of NATO territory" if needed. Base authorities advised residents near Akrotiri to shelter in place until further notice. The UK sent helicopters with counter-drone capabilities and the air-defence destroyer HMS Dragon. Greece sent two frigates, Kimon and Psara, equipped with an anti-drone strike system, as well as four F-16 fighter jets, to increase Cyprus' defence and help prevent any future attacks on the island. The French frigate Languedoc was also sent to Cyprus.

The European Commission Chief Spokesperson Paula Pinho stated that in the coming days following the attack the EU "mutual defence clause will be up for discussion". The President of the European People's Party (EPP), Manfred Weber, called Iran a "criminal regime" and vowed that an attack on the Republic of Cyprus would be considered an attack on Europe.

By 5 March 2026 the nations that had mobilised in defence of Cyprus had increased, involving Italy, the Netherlands and Spain. If requested, Ireland stated they would be willing to protect Cyprus and join the European defense coalition that had mobilised around the island. Italy sent the frigate Federico Martinengo, the Netherlands sent HNLMS Evertsen whilst Spain sent the frigate Cristóbal Colón.

Greece commented on the tension, stating that they would protect and ensure the safety of the Cyprus, and adding a statement about "the need [...] (of) Greece [...] to defend its territory". After the mobilisation of warplanes to Northern Cyprus by Turkey on 9 March 2026, the following day, Cyprus stated their disagreement on the decision to mobilise of Turkey.

In March 2026 Britain sent Martlet missile armed Wildcat helicopters to Cyprus to improve drone defence of the Akrotiri and Dhekelia bases.

On 18 March 2026 Ukraine proposed to send drone specialists to help intercept hypothetical future drones or long-range attacks threatening the British bases on the island.

On 1 April Phileleftheros reported "British Eurofighter Typhoon and F-35 Lightning II jets [were] flying round-the-clock missions from RAF Akrotiri in Cyprus, intercepting Iranian drones as part of Operation Luminous".

On 7 April, during its operations to "protect the British bases", HMS Dragon faced a "minor technical issue" and was forced to dock, which the authorities stated to be part of the routine of the mission. Reports emerged of Hezbollah launching an anti-ship missile at it on the night between 5 and 6 April, with some outlets and Israeli intelligence sources speculating that the ship had been hit and had to dock due to the damage. According to Israeli intelligence it was meant to hit an Israeli vessel but instead hit a British one, and Hezbollah confirmed a launch against an Israeli vessel had been made during the night; however, the UK denied that Dragon had been hit by any missile from Hezbollah.

It was later confirmed that the US had a military reconnaissance role in Cyprus, specifically with the verified presence of an American U-2 in the British military base.

=== Civilian ===
Message (in Greek) from Cypriot president Nikos Christodoulides following the first Iranian strikes on Cyprus

Paphos International Airport was evacuated after the two drones attempted to hit. A meeting of European Union officials on the island was postponed in response.

Following the strikes, British foreign secretary Yvette Cooper stated that the US had not been granted access to the base at Akrotiri. Despite this, the Royal Air Force (RAF) had moved additional material there in response. The strikes caused concern that the country's military could be dragged into the conflict fully, with memories of the UK's involvement in the Iraq War. The Liberal Democrats and the Green Party vowed to force a vote in Parliament over British actions in the region. Cyprus condemned the United Kingdom for not clarifying that UK bases would be used for anything other than "humanitarian" purposes and refused to rule out renegotiating the status of said bases.

In the first hour of 3 March 2026 the village of Akrotiri was fully evacuated aside from 20 individuals who refused to leave their homes.

== Possible threats ==
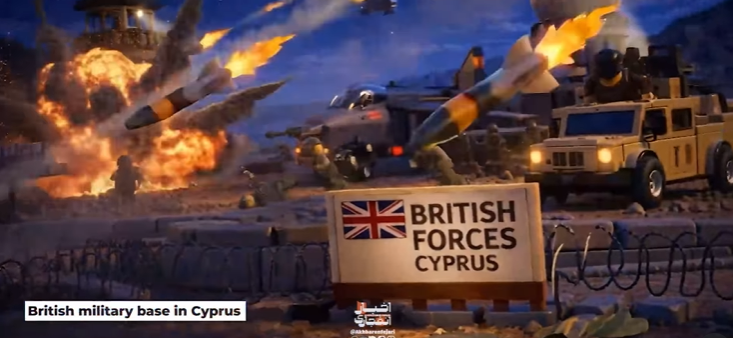
Screenshot of an AI-generated Iranian propaganda in LEGO style video circulating online showing British Forces in Cyprus being hit by Iranian ballistic missiles as revenge for the American–Israeli attack.

Cyprus expressed worries of possible terroristic cells that could act within the nations on Iran's behalf from Northern Cyprus, where 10,000 "pro‑regime" Iranians live and where, allegedly, Hamas and the Muslim Brotherhood operate.

Italian intelligence agencies have been reporting that it is highly possible that the entire Eastern Mediterranean region will be affected by the growing instability in the Levant and the Strait of Hormuz, mainly suffering impacts on energy markets and supply security, which will impact the Mediterranean countries and Europe as a whole if the Indo-Mediterranean trade route through Suez Canal-Red Sea is damaged by the conflict (specially if Houthis do a more active aid to Iran at the Gulf of Aden), generating a widening arc of instability across the multiple regions of Afro-Eurasia. Such catastrophic geopolitical possibility of maritime insecurity have been declared as the main reason of various Western countries to deploy troops with the main goal of protecting the Euro-Atlantic trade routes.

== Consequences ==
=== Increased tension between Greece and Turkey ===
The deployment of European armies, especially the Greek one and the Turkish one, significantly increased the tension between the two nations, but also between the Republic of Cyprus and the TRNC. Whilst the two nations understand the possible threats from Iran and Hezbollah, they also see each others actions doubtfully and suspiciously. The Turkish Erdogan-aligned news outlet Daily Sabah claimed that the Turkish government warned "Greek Cyprus" against further militarising Cyprus, saying it risked turning the island into a conflict target amid the broader "Middle East war" (another name for the 2026 Iran War).

Alongside the Republic of Cyprus and Greece, the US Congress also took issue with the Turkish mobilisation of F-16s stating that they were "U.S.-made military aircraft in a region not internationally recognized" and proposing possible sanctions against Turkey. Congressmen that spoke against the mobilisation include: Gregory Meeks, Chris Pappas, Dina Titus and Gus Bilirakis.

A diplomatic and military incident occurred when the Republic of Cyprus issued a NOTAM which also included the Karpas Peninsula and other areas controlled by Northern Cyprus, prompting Turkey to deem the NOTAM "null and void". As a counter-measure, Northern Cyprus issued a NOTAM of its own "nullifying" the Cypriot one. The NOTAM, whilst executed by Cyprus, seems to also involve the United States according to earlier iterations of the NOTAM itself, hinting at possible US military presence.

In May 2026 Turkish officials stated that "After [the] Gulf settles down", Turkiye would shift its attention to the Aegean sea and Cyprus, demanding a reversal of the deployment seen during the 2026 Iran War and claiming that Israel wanted to involve said regions in their military plans.

=== Tourism ===
The effects of the war and the strike on the British base had consequences on Cypriot and Greek tourism, leading many British tourists to change their destinations towards alternatives in the Western Mediterranean. Larnaca was severely impacted with a 15%-20% cancellation and 40% hotel occupancy rate (which on avarage is 60%) following the strike on the island, with even higher rates of cancellations being hinted at in Paphos and Famagusta (with some rates of cancellations reaching 25%-30%). Despite "special deals" being offered to passengers, planes directed by Jet2.com towards Cyprus, as of 24 March 2026, were reported as increasingly emptied and the company faced increasing cancellations.

Due to these consequences Marinos Moushouttas announced that the government was "conducting studies" in order to use the data to "determine the appropriate response as quickly as possible".

The situation was still dramatic in May 2026, with a 60% drop in bookings for the summer season. It started to recover by July 2026, with tourists from Poland, Israel, the United Kingdom, Germany, Romania and Denmark returning to the island.

=== Debate on the status of UK military bases in Cyprus ===
After the attack, some Cypriot Palestine solidarity groups protested outside the Presidential Palace and the Ministry of Foreign Affairs to ask for an end to all military and diplomatic ties with Israel, the United States, Greece and other nations that back efforts to intervene in Iran. The groups made a public declaration asking for an end to military connections with the "2+1" group, which includes Greece, Israel and the United States, and for the British military bases in Cyprus to be removed. This public sentiment has grown in the general populace in the weeks following the strike, especially after the delay in British mobilisation to defend Cyprus and the blows the strike caused in the local economy.

The president of Cyprus labelled the British bases "colonial" and for the first time called upon discussions regarding their status (to be held at the end of the conflict in the Middle East), stating that everything was on the table, including their revocation. The EU endorsed Cyprus call for discussions regarding the status of the bases.

Talks on the status of the British bases and holdings on the island started on 25 March 2026, one day following the latest incident.

In an April interview regarding the operations of the UK in defence of its bases, First Sea Lord Gen Sir Gwyn Jenkins said the Navy has "work to do" before it is ready for combat.

=== Increased calls for EU common defence ===
Despite the target being the British bases of Akrotiri and Dhekelia, Cyprus itself was also threatened and faced the consequences of the strikes. Thus, Cyprus pushed for discussions to be opened on how Article 42(7) of the European Union should work in practice, something which had largely remained theoretical up until then. The discussion is set to appear on the agenda of the informal European Council to be held in Cyprus on 23 and 24 April.

Public sentiment regarding the EU seems to also have shifted with interviewers interviewed by the Deustche Welle stating increased trust in the bloc and even views seeing it as a better alternative then British defence. This increasingly became the case as HMS Dragon had not yet arrived to Cyprus, causing local outrage and even from Christodoulides himself.

== List of Europeans assets deployed in Cyprus as a response ==
- Greece
  - HS Kimon, Psara and Elli frigates
  - 4 F-16V fighters
- France
  - Languedoc frigate
  - Air defence and anti-drone systems
- United Kingdom
  - HMS Dragon destroyer
  - 2 Royal Navy AW159 Wildcat helicopters
- Italy
  - Federico Martinengo frigate
- Spain
  - Cristóbal Colón frigate
- Germany
  - Nordrhein-Westfalen frigate
- Netherlands
  - HNLMS Evertsen frigate
