= 2026 Iran war order of battle =

This is the order of battle of the 2026 Iran war. It reports commands, formations and units where sources have specifically indicated their involvement in the war. It does not indicate higher commands or intermediate commands unless there are sources specifically indicating their involvement. As this list is dependent on sources to identify involvement, it does not purport to be complete.

== Offensive operations ==
=== United States ===
==== United States Army ====
- United States Army Central
  - 103rd Expeditionary Sustainment Command
  - 4th Combat Aviation Brigade
  - 2nd Brigade Combat Team, 10th Mountain Division
  - Elements, 82nd Airborne Division
  - 20th Special Forces Group, Army National Guard
  - 32nd Army Air and Missile Defense Command
  - 42nd Infantry Division
  - 2nd Battalion, 127th Infantry Regiment
  - 160th Special Operations Aviation Regiment
  - 1st Space Battalion

==== United States Air Force ====
- Ninth Air Force (Air Forces Central)
  - 609th Air Operations Center
    - 4th Fighter Wing
      - 335th Fighter Squadron
    - 6th Air Refueling Wing
      - 99th Air Refueling Squadron
    - 23rd Air Wing
      - 74th Fighter Squadron
      - 75th Fighter Squadron
    - 48th Fighter Wing
      - 494th Tactical Fighter Squadron
    - 43rd Electronic Combat Squadron
    - 121st Air Refueling Wing, Ohio Air National Guard
      - 166th Air Refueling Squadron
    - 190th Fighter Squadron
    - 107th Fighter Squadron
    - 141st Air Refueling Wing, Washington Air National Guard
    - 157th Air Refueling Wing, New Hampshire Air National Guard
    - 134th Fighter Squadron
    - 157th Fighter Squadron
    - 172nd Airlift Wing, Mississippi Air National Guard
    - 186th Air Refueling Wing, Mississippi Air National Guard
    - 190th Air Refueling Wing, Kansas Air National Guard
    - 332nd Air Expeditionary Wing
    - 366th Fighter Wing
      - 391st Fighter Squadron
    - 378th Air Expeditionary Wing
    - 379th Air Expeditionary Wing
    - 380th Air Expeditionary Wing
    - 386th Air Expeditionary Wing
    - 552nd Air Control Wing
- Eighth Air Force
  - 5th Bomb Wing
    - 23rd Bomb Squadron
  - 28th Bomb Wing
    - 34th Bomb Squadron
    - 37th Bomb Squadron
  - 509th Bomb Wing
- 427th Special Operations Squadron

==== United States Navy and Marine Corps ====
- United States Naval Forces Central Command / United States Fifth Fleet (Note: The United States Naval Forces Central Command and the United States Fifth Fleet operates as a single command, sharing both commander and headquarters.)
  - Carrier Strike Group 3
    - USS Abraham Lincoln
      - Carrier Air Wing 9
        - Strike Fighter Squadron 14
        - Helicopter Sea Combat Squadron 14
        - Strike Fighter Squadron 41
        - Helicopter Maritime Strike Squadron 71
        - Carrier Airborne Early Warning Squadron 117
        - Electronic Attack Squadron 133
        - Strike Fighter Squadron 151
        - Marine Fighter Attack Squadron 314
    - Destroyer Squadron 21
      - USS Frank E. Petersen Jr.
      - USS Spruance
      - USS Michael Murphy
  - Carrier Strike Group 12
    - USS Gerald R. Ford
      - Carrier Air Wing 8
        - Strike Fighter Squadron 31
        - Strike Fighter Squadron 37
        - Fleet Logistics Squadron 40
        - Helicopter Maritime Strike Squadron 70
        - Strike Fighter Squadron 87
        - Airborne Command and Control Squadron 124
        - Electronic Attack Squadron 142
        - Strike Fighter Squadron 213
        - Helicopter Sea Combat Squadron 9
    - Destroyer Squadron 2
      - USS Mahan
      - USS Bainbridge
      - USS Winston S. Churchill
  - Tripoli Amphibious Ready Group
    - USS Tripoli
      - Helicopter Sea Combat Squadron 25
      - Marine Fighter Attack Squadron 121
      - Marine Medium Tiltrotor Squadron 265
    - USS New Orleans
    - 31st Marine Expeditionary Unit
  - Boxer Amphibious Ready Group
    - USS Boxer
    - USS Portland
    - USS Comstock
    - 11th Marine Expeditionary Unit
  - USS Bulkeley
  - USS Canberra
  - USNS Carl Brashear
  - USS Charlotte
  - USS Delbert D. Black
    - Helicopter Maritime Strike Squadron 46
  - USNS Henry J. Kaiser
  - USS John Finn
    - Helicopter Maritime Strike Squadron 51
  - USNS Kanawha
  - USS McFaul
  - USS Milius
  - USS Mitscher
  - USS Oscar Austin
  - USS Pinckney
  - USS Rafael Peralta
  - USS Roosevelt
  - USS Santa Barbara
  - USS Thomas Hudner
  - USS Tulsa
  - USNS William McLean

==== Other ====
- Task Force Scorpion Strike (Note: It is unknown if this is a joint-service unit or otherwise.)
- Central Intelligence Agency
- United States Cyber Command

=== Israel ===
==== Israeli Army ====
  - 1st Golani Brigade
  - 7th Saar me-Golan Armored Brigade
    - 77th Armored Battalion
  - 621st Egoz Unit
  - 91st Galilee Division
    - 91st Galilee Cats Engineering Company
    - 300th Bar'am Brigade
    - 769th Hiram Brigade
    - 7338th Artillery Brigade
  - 890th Efea/Echis Paratroopers Battalion
  - 146th Ha Mapatz Division
  - 613th Hasmonean Brigade
  - 84th Givati Brigade
  - 401st Iron Tracks Brigade
    - 9th Eshet Armored Battalion
  - 933rd Nahal Brigade
  - 210th Bashan Division
    - 810th Mountain Brigade

==== Israeli Air Force ====
  - 109th Valley Squadron
  - 107th Orange Knights Squadron
  - 106th Spearhead Squadron
  - 120th Desert Giants Squadron
  - Northern Meron Air Traffic Control Unit

==== Other ====
- Unit 8200

=== Saudi Arabia ===
- Royal Saudi Air Force

=== United Arab Emirates ===
- United Arab Emirates Air Force

=== Kuwait ===
- Kuwait Air Force

=== Bahrain ===
- 1st Tactical Fighter Squadron (Royal Bahraini Air Force)
- 2nd Tactical Fighter Squadron (Royal Bahraini Air Force)
- Long Range Missile Battalion (Royal Bahraini Army)

=== Yemen ===
- Yemeni Air Force

=== Non-state actors against Iran ===
- Coalition of Political Forces of Iranian Kurdistan
  - Democratic Party of Iranian Kurdistan
  - Kurdistan Free Life Party
  - Kurdistan Freedom Party
  - Komala Party of Iranian Kurdistan
- Sun of Hope
- Ahwaz Falcons
- Ahwaz Freedom Brigades
- People's Fighters Front
- Counter-Terrorism Strike Force
- People's Mojahedin Organization of Iran

== Defensive operations ==
=== Australia ===
- Detachment, No. 2 Squadron RAAF (Royal Australian Air Force)
- Elements, Special Air Service Regiment (Australian Army)

=== Azerbaijan ===
Troops and air defence systems deployed on border with Iran.

=== Canada ===
Military advisors with U.S. Ninth Air Force, see above

=== France ===
==== French Army ====
  - 4th Air Combat Brigade
  - 7th Battalion of Chasseurs Alpins
  - 54th Artillery Regiment

==== French Air and Space Force ====
  - Escadron de Chasse 1/5 Vendée
  - Escadron de Chasse 1/7 Provence
  - Escadron de détection et de contrôle aéroportés 36 Berry

==== French Navy ====
  - Charles de Gaulle
    - Flottille 4F
  - Chevalier Paul
  - Bretagne
  - Languedoc
  - Jacques Chevallier
  - Forbin
  - Tonnerre
  - Courbet

=== Germany ===
- Nordrhein-Westfalen (German Navy)

=== Greece ===
- A squadron of F-16s (Hellenic Air Force)
- 350th Guided Missile Wing (Hellenic Air Force)
- Kimon (Hellenic Navy)
- Psara (Hellenic Navy)

=== Iraq ===
- Iraqi National Intelligence Service
- Joint Operations Command

==== Iraqi Air Force ====
  - 23rd Squadron

==== Iraqi Army ====
  - Eastern Salah al Din Operations Command
  - Basra Operations Command
  - Karbala Operations Command
    - 41st Brigade

==== Kurdistan Region ====
  - Peshmerga
    - 11th Brigade
  - Counter Terrorism Department

=== Italy ===
- Federico Martinengo (Italian Navy)
- 14° Stormo Sergio Sartof (Italian Air Force)
- 51° Stormo Ferruccio Serafini (Italian Air Force)

=== Jordan ===
- Royal Jordanian Air Force

=== Lebanon ===
At least three soldiers and a member of the General Security Directorate killed as a result of Israeli military action.

=== Netherlands ===
- HNLMS Evertsen (Royal Netherlands Navy)

=== Oman ===
Interception of drones, and the rescue of crew from a freighter struck by missiles by the Royal Navy of Oman.

=== Pakistan ===
Activation of the SMDA with Saudi Arabia after attacks on Saudi Arabia. Pakistani F-16s were already in Saudi Arabia for a joint exercise at the start of the war. Air defence systems were deployed.
Pakistan's Navy undertook security operations in the region to protect shipping.

=== Palestine ===
- Palestinian Civil Defence

=== Qatar ===
Iran has claimed Qatar has retaliated with strikes into Iran (denied).
The Qatari Emiri Navy and Air Force have been active in defending against drone and air strikes. Two Iranian Su-24 tactical bombers targeting al-Udeid and Ras Laffan Industrial City were shot down by a Qatari F-15QA.

=== Spain ===
- Cristóbal Colón (Spanish Navy)
- Regimiento de Artillería antiaérea 73 (Spanish Army)

=== Syria ===
Syria has reinforced its borders with Lebanon and Iraq, with reports of shelling from Lebanon by Hezbollah.

- 60th Division (army)

=== Turkey ===
Turkey deployed F-16 fighter jets and air defense systems to Northern Cyprus.

=== Ukraine ===
Ukraine has sent anti-drone teams to several countries to defend against Iranian drones.

=== United Kingdom ===
==== Royal Navy ====
  - HMS Dragon
  - HMS Anson
  - RFA Lyme Bay
  - 815 Naval Air Squadron
  - 820 Naval Air Squadron
  - United Kingdom Commando Force
    - Air Defence Troop

==== British Army ====
  - 7th Air Defence Group
    - 12th Regiment Royal Artillery
    - 16th Regiment Royal Artillery

==== Royal Air Force ====
  - No. 2 Squadron
  - No. 9 Squadron
  - No. 10 Squadron
  - No. 12 Squadron
  - No. 31 Squadron
  - No. 617 Squadron
  - No. 34 Squadron RAF Regiment
  - No. 90 Signals Unit
  - Space Command
    - No. 1 Space Operations Squadron
    - No. 2 Space Warning Squadron

== Iran ==
This list is largely compiled from reports of strikes on military and other government targets.

=== Islamic Republic of Iran armed forces ===
==== Ground Forces ====
  - 44th Artillery Group
  - 55th Artillery Group
  - 55th Airborne Brigade
  - 56th Younes Artillery Group
  - 65th Airborne Special Forces Brigade
  - 92nd Armored Division
    - 292nd Armored Brigade
  - Islamic Republic of Iran Army Aviation

==== Air Force ====
  - 21st Tactical Fighter Squadron
  - 22nd Tactical Fighter Squadron
  - 23rd Tactical Fighter Squadron

==== Navy ====
- Southern Fleet
  - IRIS Fateh (sunk)
  - IRIS Kurdistan (sunk)
  - IRIS Makran (sunk)
  - IRIS Sabalan (suspected sunk)
  - IRIS Zagros (suspected sunk)
  - IRIS Alvand (claimed sunk)
  - IRIS Sahand (sunk)
  - IRIS Dena (sunk)
  - IRIS Bayandor (sunk)
  - IRIS Naghdi (sunk)
  - IRIS Hamzeh (sunk)
  - IRIS Deylaman (sunk)
- Islamic Republic of Iran Navy Aviation

==== Air Defense Force ====
  - Shiraz Air Defense Center
    - Kharg Air Defense Complex
    - Shahid Sattari Rapid Reaction Air Defense Group

=== Islamic Revolutionary Guard Corps ===
==== Ground Forces ====
  - 8th Najaf Ashraf Division
  - 14th Imam Hossein Division
  - 29th Nabi Akram Operational Division
  - 15th Imam Hassan Mojtaba Special Forces Brigade
  - 32nd Ansar ol Hossein Brigade
  - 1st Hazrat-e Hojjat Independent Armored Brigade
  - 38th Zolfaghar Independent Armored Brigade
  - 41st Tharallah Division
  - Saheb ol Zaman Provincial Unit
  - 33rd Al-Mahdi Brigade
  - Ansar ol Mehdi Unit
  - 3rd Hazrat‑e Mehdi Ranger Brigade
  - 20th Ramzan Independent Armored Brigade
  - 22nd Ground Forces Division
  - 31st Ashoura Mechanized Division
  - Sabireen Special Forces Brigade
  - Kurdistan Beit-ol-Moqaddas Corps
    - 22nd Beit ol Moqaddas Operational Division
  - Imam Sadegh Unit
  - 14th Imam Sadegh Infantry Brigade
  - 18th Al Ghadir Brigade
  - 88th Ansar ol Reza Brigade
  - 11th Amir ol Momenin Brigade
  - 19th Fajr Operational Division
  - Ramadan Unit

==== Aerospace Force ====
  - 7th Al Hadid Missile Brigade
  - 23rd Al Tawhid Missile Brigade
  - 840th Missile Group

==== Navy ====
  - 1st Saheb ol Zaman Region
    - 2nd Imam Sajjad Special Forces Brigade
    - 16th Assef Coastal Missile Group
    - 112th Zolfaghar Surface Combat Brigade
  - IRIS Jamaran (sunk)
  - IRIS Shahid Bagheri (struck)
  - IRIS Shahid Soleimani (claimed sunk)
  - IRIS Shahid Sayyad Shirazi (struck)
  - IRIS Abu Mahdi al-Muhandis (struck)
  - 26th Salaman Missile Group

==== Quds Force ====
  - Lebanon Corps

=== Ministry of Intelligence ===
  - Espionage Division
  - Qom Intelligence Directorate

== Axis of Resistance ==
=== Hezbollah ===
- Intelligence Unit
- Unit 127
- Unit 7900
- Badr Unit
- Radwan Force
- Imam Hussein Brigade
- Lebanese Resistance Brigades

=== Houthis ===
Launched missile and UAV strikes on Israel.

=== Amal Movement ===
Played an active role in hostilities in Lebanon against Israel.

=== Popular Mobilization Forces ===
- 6th Kataib Jund al Imam PMF Brigade
- 14th PMF Brigade
- 15th PMF Brigade
- 16th PMF Brigade
- 18th Saraya Talia al Khurasani Brigade
- 27th PMF Brigade
- 19th PMF Brigade
- 30th Shabak PMF Brigade
- 31st PMF Brigade
- 33rd PMF Brigade
- 40th Kataib al Imam Ali Brigade
- 45th PMF Brigade
- 50th PMF Brigade
- 53rd PMF Brigade
- 52nd PMF Brigade
- 55th Badr PMF Brigade
- 59th Ninveh PMF Brigade
- 24th PMF Regiment
- 61st Badr PMF Brigade
- 63rd Badr PMF Brigade
- 65th PMF Brigade
  - 2nd Tribal Mobilization Forces Regiment
- PMF General Secretariat Special Forces Regiment
- Turkmen Brigades

=== Islamic Resistance in Iraq ===
  - 12th Harakat Hezbollah al-Nujaba Brigade
  - 13th Kata'ib Hezbollah Brigade
  - Saraya Awliya al-Dam
  - Ashab al-Kahf
  - Jaysh al-Ghadab
  - True Promise Corps
  - Rijal al-Bas al-Shadid

=== Others ===
- Hamas in Lebanon
- Kataib Jund al-Karrar
- Islamic Group
- Hamas
- Palestinian Islamic Jihad
- Popular Front for the Liberation of Palestine
- Syrian Social Nationalist Party in Lebanon
