= Italian frigate Federico Martinengo =

FREMM class multi-purpose frigates in the Italian Navy

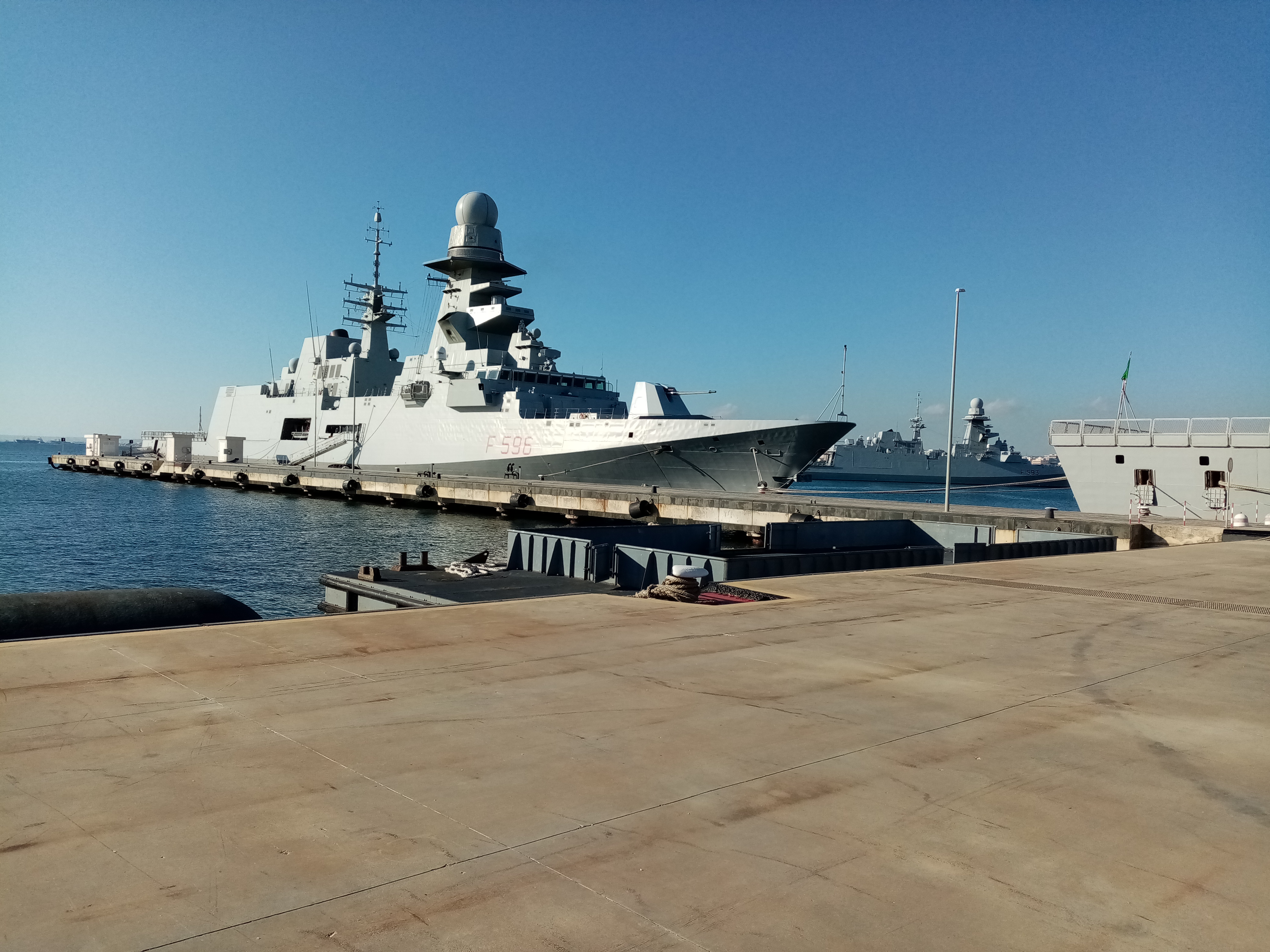
- Federico Martinengo at Taranto on 30 September 2019

History

Italy
- Name: Federico Martinengo
- Namesake: Federico Martinengo
- Builder: Fincantieri, Riva Trigoso and Muggiano
- Laid down: 5 June 2014
- Launched: 4 March 2017
- Commissioned: 24 April 2018
- Home port: Taranto
- Identification: Pennant number: F 596
- Motto: Sufficit animus; (The voice of the soul)
- Status: Active

General characteristics
- Class & type: Carlo Bergamini-class frigate
- Displacement: 6,700 tons
- Length: 144.6 m (474.4 ft)
- Beam: 19.7 m (64.6 ft)
- Draught: 8.7 m (28.5 ft)
- Propulsion: CODLAG; 1 × 32 MW gas turbine General Electric/Avio LM2500+G4; 2 × 2.5 MW electric motors Jeumont Electric; 4 × diesel generators; VL 1716 (T2ME series by 2,15 MW everyone, on first two frigate; HPCR series by 2,8 MW everyone, since the third frigate); 2 × shafts, driving controllable pitch propellers; 1 × 1 MW bow thruster
- Speed: 27 knots (50 km/h; 31 mph); max cruise speed 15.6 knots (28.9 km/h; 18.0 mph)
- Range: 6,800 nmi (12,600 km; 7,800 mi) at 15 knots (28 km/h; 17 mph)
- Complement: 199
- Sensors & processing systems: Leonardo Kronos Grand Naval (MFRA) Active electronically scanned array radar; CAPTAS-4 towed-array sonar; UMS 4110 CL hull-mounted sonar
- Armament: 16-cell MBDA SYLVER A50 VLS for 16 MBDA Aster 15 and 30 missiles; 1 × Leonardo Otobreda 127/64 Vulcano; 1 × Leonardo OTO Melara 76/62 mm Davide/Strales CIWS gun; 2 × Leonardo Oto Melara/Oerlikon KBA 25/80 mm remote weapon systems; 8 × MBDA Teseo\Otomat Mk-2/A anti-ship and land attack missiles; 2 x triple Leonardo (WASS) B-515/3 launcher for MU 90 torpedoes; 2 x SITEP MASS CS-424 acoustic guns
- Aircraft carried: 2 × SH90; 1 × SH90; 1 × AW101 (armed with MU 90 torpedoes or MBDA Marte Mk2/S missiles)
- Aviation facilities: Double hangar

Federico Martinengo (F 596) is a Carlo Bergamini-class frigate of the Italian Navy. The Carlo Bergamini class were developed from the FREMM multipurpose frigate program.

== Development and design ==
Planning assumptions for the Italian Navy are ten FREMM-IT frigates of which four were anti-submarine warfare (ASW) variants and six were general purpose (GP) variants at a cost of €5.9 billion. FREMM-IT will replace the Maestrale and Lupo-class frigates in service with the Italian Navy. In the 2013 Italian budget, the Italian government laid out the necessary financing for two more GP variants (FREMM-IT 7 & 8) and the contract was awarded in September 2013. On 15 April 2015, the Italian Parliament confirmed the deal between OCCAR and Orizzonte Sistemi Navali Spa (Fincantieri and Finmeccanica, since 2017 Leonardo) to begin building units 9 and 10, for 764 million Euros.

As of 16 April 2015, the Italian government has approved funding for all ten FREMM-IT to be delivered to the Italian Navy (four ASW variants and six GP variants).

FREMM-IT 9 & 10 will have undisclosed enhanced capabilities. All ten Italian FREMM-ITs have extended anti-air warfare (AAW) capabilities, with SAAM-ESD CMS, Aster 30 and Aster 15 missiles for extended area defence. SAAM-ESD CMS use Leonardo MFRA, a 3D active radar (AESA), an evolved version of the Leonardo EMPAR PESA radar (previously embarked on Horizon-class destroyers and the aircraft carrier Cavour). Since the seventh FREMM-IT, there will be updates, such as new conformal IFF antenna and much more stealth response. Since the ninth FREMM-IT, SCLAR-H replaced with Leonardo ODLS-20. In 2017 the Italian FREMM refit started with the installation on each of two SITEP MS-424 acoustic guns.

In 2020 it was reported that Italy would sell its last two FREMM-class frigates in the current production line (Spartaco Schergat and Emilio Bianchi) to Egypt. Spartaco Schergat was in the final stage of her sea trials while Emilio Bianchi would follow within one year. The deal reportedly also involved other military equipment and was worth 1.2 billion Euros. It was reported that Italy would then order two additional FREMM frigates to replace those transferred to Egypt with the anticipated delivery of the replacements by 2024.

== Construction and career ==
On 4 March 2017, the launching ceremony of the ship took place at the Fincantieri yard in Riva Trigoso. Federico Martinengo was commissioned on 24 April 2018.

On 9 May 2019, she collided with Sofia Fabio off western coast of Sicily.

On 7 March 2020, Federico Martinengo successfully fired an Aster missile.

From 4 to 6 March 2024, the ship was part of the DIMDEX 2024 in Doha, Qatar.

== Gallery ==
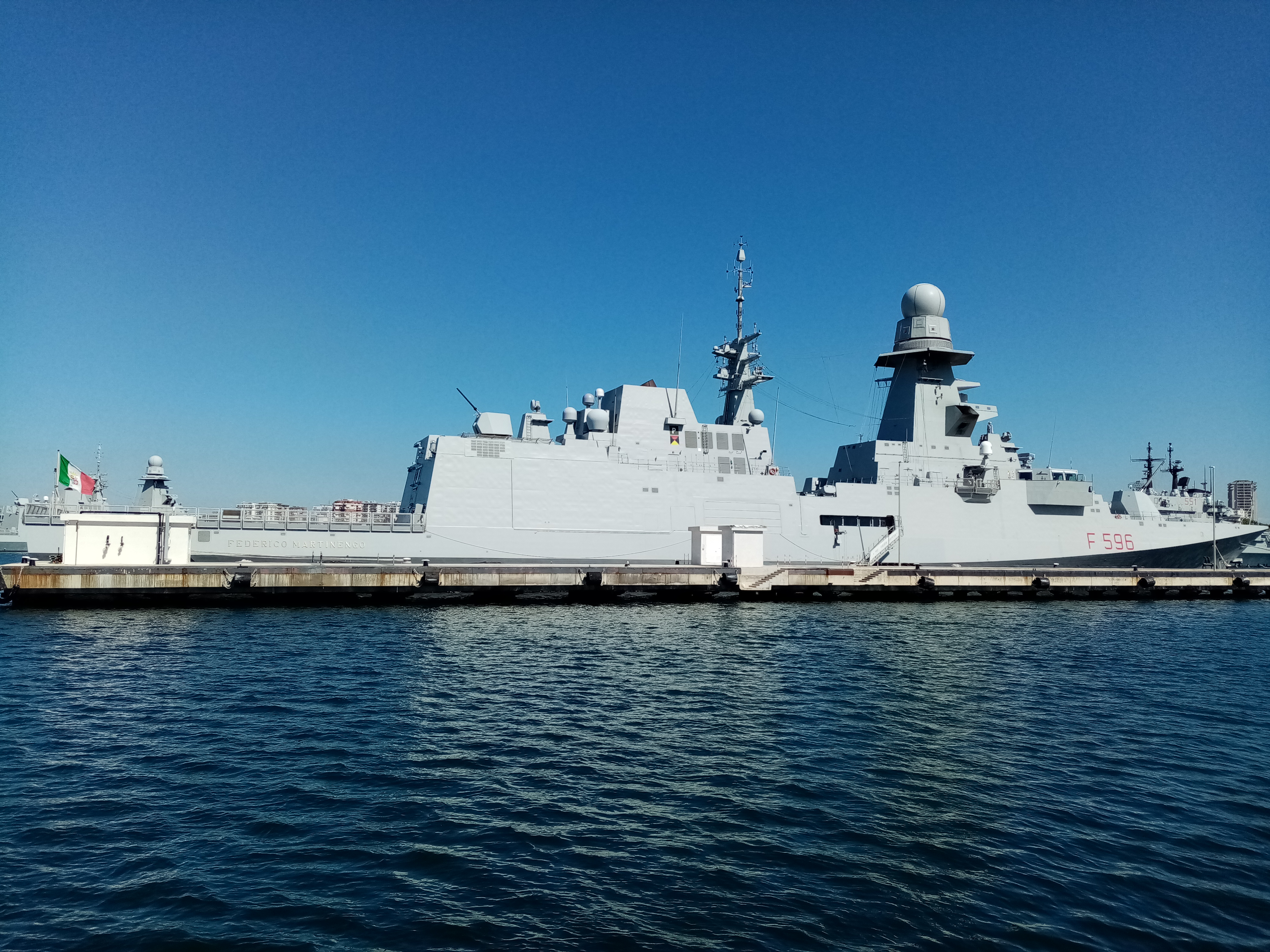
Federico Martinengo at Le Spezia on 30 September 2019.
