= Kuwait in the 2026 Iran war =

Retaliatory strikes in the 2026 Iran war

- Part of the 2026 Iran war
- Kuwait in the 2026 Iran war (Kuwait)
Date	28 February 2026 – present
Location	Kuwait
Status	Ongoing; 3 American F-15Es shot down over Kuwait in a friendly fire incident.; US and Italian military installations attacked in Kuwait.; Canadian military base damaged during the strikes.

Belligerents
Iran	Kuwait; Bahrain; United States; United Arab Emirates; Defensive/precautionary: Canada; Italy

Units involved
- See order of battle

Casualties and losses
(Iran) Several missiles and drones intercepted; (Iran) 4 IRGC soldiers captured	(Kuwait) 4 servicemembers killed, 82 wounded; (United States) 7 soldiers killed, dozens wounded; (United States) 3 F-15Es shot down (friendly fire), 1 CH-47 Chinook damaged; (Italy) 1 MQ-9 Reaper destroyed, 2 Eurofighter Typhoons damaged
- 8 civilians killed, 108 injured

On 28 February 2026, during the 2026 Iran war, Iran began launching a series of retaliatory strikes on American and Kuwaiti targets within Kuwait.

== Incidents ==
External videos
- CCTV Captures Moment Kuwait International Airport Hit By Iranian Strike
- Iranian Drone Strikes Kuwait International Airport
- Iranian drone strikes US military facility in Kuwait
- Smoke rises after Iranian strike on military base in Kuwait

=== February ===
28 February

Iranian drones struck Kuwait International Airport and the Ali Al Salem Air Base.

=== March ===
1 March

An Iranian drone struck the US garrison at Camp Buehring in northeastern Kuwait. Later press research from late April 2026 revealed that an Iranian air force fighter jet, a Northrop F-5, had penetrated the multi layered defences of Camp Buehring and conducted a successful bombing run.

Another Iranian missile attack targeted a makeshift operation center near the civilian port of Shuaiba, Kuwait. Six US soldiers were killed and dozens were wounded, of those 38 were hospitalized in various medical centers. Chief Warrant Officer 3 Robert Marzan, a veteran with 36 years of service, was also killed at the Port of Shuaiba in Kuwait. This attack is described as the deadliest strike against U.S. forces.

2 March

Two Navy servicemen from Kuwait were killed in the line of duty, according to Kuwaiti officials.

An F/A-18 of the Kuwait Air Force shot down three American F-15Es in a friendly fire incident. The American crew members survived. That same day, the U.S embassy in Kuwait was likely hit by an Iranian missile strike.

The Camp Canada military base located within the Ali Al Salem Air Base was struck by Iranian missiles. During the attack, Canadian soldiers took shelter inside bunkers and suffered no casualties. Satellite images showed that Canadian bunkers had been damaged during the attack. Information regarding the attack was made public on 12 March 2026. The Canadian government later faced criticism for not being transparent about the attack.

6 March

The Kuwaiti Ministry of Defense reported that 67 Kuwaiti service members had been wounded during the conflict.

9 March

The Interior Ministry of Kuwait reported the deaths of two border guards during an incident at dawn. Mishal Al-Ahmad Al-Jaber Al-Sabah, the Emir of Kuwait, said his country is facing an unprovoked attack from a neighboring Muslim country "which we consider a friend, and to which we did not allow the use of our land, airspace, or waters for any military action against it."

10–11 March

Kuwait said it intercepted several Iranian missiles and drones overnight.

12 March

Kuwait's electricity ministry said that debris from Iranian drones put six power lines out of service.

15 March

In the afternoon, the Italian garrison at Ali Al Salem Air Base was struck by an Iranian drone and missiles. The attack destroyed a General Atomics MQ-9 Reaper combat drone belonging to the Italian Army. Also two Italian Eurofighter Typhoons were damaged in the ground by shrapnel and remained nonoperational. No personnel were injured in the attack.

17 March

Two minor injuries were reported as a result of falling shrapnel from Iranian missiles and drones intercepted over the Kuwaiti airspace.

19 March

A drone hit the Mina Al-Ahmadi refinery, causing a small fire. No injuries were reported.

20 March

Kuwait reported that its Mina Al-Ahmadi refinery was hit again by an Iranian attack.

23 March

The Iranian Islamic Revolutionary Guard Corps released a video supposedly showing missiles and drones being launched against a US base in Kuwait.

24 March

Iranian drones struck a fuel tank at Kuwait International Airport, starting a fire and causing moderate damage to the airport. No casualties were reported.

28 March

Several drones were aimed at Kuwait International Airport. No injuries were reported, but the strikes caused "significant" damage to the radar system at the airport.

29 March

Kuwait's National Guard shot down four drones. The defense ministry said that 10 soldiers were injured by ballistic missiles and drones that hit a military camp.

30 March

The Kuwaiti National Guard said that it shot down five drones. An Indian worker was killed after an Iranian strike on a power and water desalination plant in Kuwait. Another Indian worker in Kuwait was killed by falling Iranian missile debris.

31 March

The Kuwaiti oil tanker Al Salmi was attacked by an Iranian drone, causing damage to its hull. According to the report, no sailors were injured, but there was a possibility of oil spill and fires.

=== April ===
3 April

Kuwait's Ministry of Electricity, Water, and Renewable Energy reported that Iranian drones struck a power and desalination plant, causing damage to the structure. Another drone also hit the Mina al-Ahmadi refinery, causing several fires and damage, but no injuries.

That same day, another Iranian drone damaged a US Army Boeing CH-47 Chinook helicopter on the ground.

5 April

Kuwait Petroleum Corporation (KPC) and Kuwait National Petroleum Company (KNPC) confirmed they were attacked by Iranian drones. According to the reports the attacks caused fires to several facilities causing severe damage. No casualties were reported.

6 April

Six people were injured by debris from an Iranian attack.

Fifteen Americans were wounded in an overnight Iranian drone strike on Ali Al Salem Air Base.

8 April

Despite the ceasefire agreement between the US and Iran, Kuwait air defense reported that it has intercepted waves of Iranian drones targeting vital facilities, power stations and water desalination plants, causing major infrastructure damage.

9 April

Iranian drones attacked vital infrastructure in Kuwait, resulting in air defence systems to fire.

=== May ===
1 May

Six Iranian IRGC troops took part in a raid at Bubiyan Island in Kuwait. The IRGC and Kuwait Armed Forces exchanged fire, resulting in the injury of one Kuwaiti soldier. Four of the IRGC troops were captured, while the remainder fled. Kuwait accused Iran of the attack on 12 May. The Iranian foreign ministry stated that the four officers had entered Kuwaiti seas by mistake "due to a disruption in the navigation system".

According to The Wall Street Journal, Kuwait launched attacks on Iranian-backed Iraqi militias from its own territory. Iraqi officials reported that there were at least two rocket attacks from Kuwaiti territory in April.

=== June ===
3 June

An Iranian drone struck the Kuwait International Airport, leading to the temporary shutdown of the airspace and damage to Terminal 1, as well as 1 death and 63 injuries. Iran’s IRGC denied the attacks, saying it resulted from a malfunctioning MIM-104 Patriot battery, although footage from the Kuwait News Agency showed an Iranian Shahed-136 drone attacking the Airport. Kuwaiti authorities condemned the attack and vowed retaliation.

=== July ===
18 July

On 18 July, after an American airstrike on a desalination plant in Jask, Iran, the Iranian military targeted a desalination plant in Kuwait.

22 July

On 22 July, the Iranian Army reported a wave of one-way drone attacks on the American depot and ground forces logistics center in al-Doha base in Kuwait.

== Casualties ==
In the strikes against Kuwait, 4 soldiers and 8 civilians were killed, while 82 soldiers and 108 civilians were injured.

== Reactions ==
On 26 March, Kuwait along with other five Gulf countries (Saudi Arabia, the United Arab Emirates, Bahrain, Qatar, and Jordan) issued a joint condemnation about Iran and its affiliated armed groups in Iraq, attacks against countries in the region and their facilities and infrastructure.

On 11 April, Kuwait announced that it arrested 24 people in a plot to undermine national security, with some of the actors connected to Iran. Also on 11 April, Saudi Arabia condemned Iranian drone attacks on Kuwait.

On 20 April, the US urged defense contractor Vectrus to evacuate its workers from Kuwait out of fear of attacks from Iran-backed militias.
