= Madhat Ibraheem Jumaa =

Madhat Mohammad Jumaa
- مدحت جمعة

Jordanian ambassador to the United Kingdom of Jordan to United Kingdom
- In office 1952–1953

Jordanian ambassador to Pakistan of Jordan to Pakistan
- In office 1953–1956

Jordanian Ambassador to the United States of Jordan to United States
- In office 27 October 1958 – 20 October 1959
- Preceded by: Yousef Haikal
- Succeeded by: Yousef Haikal

Jordanian Ambassador to Germany of Jordan to Germany
- In office 1962 – 13 May 1965
- Preceded by: Abdallah Salamé Zureikat
- Succeeded by: Kamal Sherif

Jordanian Ambassador to the United Kingdom of Jordan to United Kingdom
- In office 1967–1969
- Preceded by: Anastas Hanania
- Succeeded by: Saad Jumaa

Jordanian Ambassador to Tunisia of Jordan to Tunisia
- In office 1969–1970

Jordanian Ambassador to Spain of Jordan to Spain
- In office September 1971 – 1972
- Preceded by: Muhammad Hussain El-Farra
- Succeeded by: Taher al-Masri

Jordanian Ambassador to Iran of Jordan to Iran
- In office 16 February 1974 – 1975

Personal details
- Born: 10 August 1920
- Relatives: brother of Saad Jumaa
- Education: University of Cairo

Madhat Mohammad Jumaa (born 10 August 1920) was a Jordanian ambassador.

== Career ==
From 1945 to 1947, he served as attaché to the Arab League in Cairo. He then became the First Secretary and Counsellor until 1952.

Afterwards, he moved to the embassy in London, where he was Counsellor and Charge d'Affaires from 1952 to 1953.

From 1953 to 1956 he was the ambassador to Pakistan.

Jumaa then returned to Jordan, where in 1956 he was Chief of Protocol at the Royal Palace in Amman.

From 1956 to 1958 he was Under-Secretary for Press and Broadcasting.

From 1958 to 1959, he served as ambassador to the United States in Washington.

He was ambassador in Bonn, West Germany between 1962 and 1965.

From 1965 to 1967, he was ambassador in Beirut, Lebanon.

Jumaa then returned to London, serving as ambassador between 1967 and 1969.

From 1969 to 1970, he was ambassador in Tunis, Tunisia.

Jumaa was in Spain from September 1971 to 16 February 1974, where he was the ambassador in Madrid. At the same time, he was also the ambassador to Romania and Tunisia.

From 16 February 1974 to 1975, he was ambassador in Teheran, Iran.
