= Farhan Shubailat =

Jordanian politician and ambassador

- فرحان شبيلات

Jordanian Ambassador to Lebanon of Jordan to Lebanon
- In office 1949–1949
- Preceded by: 1948: Baha Toukan
- Succeeded by: 1957-1958: Abdelmunim al-Rifai; 1961 – 1965: Abdallah Salamé Zureikat

Mayor of Amman
- In office 1953–1954
- Preceded by: Hazza' al-Majali
- Succeeded by: Omar Matar

Jordanian Minister of Defense
- In office 1955–1955
- Preceded by: Fawzi Al-Mulki

Jordanian Ambassador to Germany of Jordan to Germany
- In office 1956–1957
- Succeeded by: Abdallah Salamé Zureikat

Jordanian Ambassador to Libya of Jordan to Libya
- In office 1959–1959

Jordanian Ambassador to Morocco of Jordan to Morocco
- In office 1961–1961

Jordanian Ambassador to the United States of Jordan to United States
- In office October 28, 1965 November 16, 1965 – August 30, 1967
- Preceded by: Sa'ad Jum'a
- Succeeded by: Abdelhamid Sharaf

Jordanian Ambassador to Germany of Jordan to Germany
- In office September 12, 1967 – 1971
- Preceded by: Madhat Ibraheem Jumah
- Succeeded by: Nijmeddin Dajani

Personal details
- Born: 1911 Tafila
- Died: 1979
- Children: Major General Dr. Gaith F. Shubeilat, Laith Shubeilat, Ambassador Talal Shubeilat
- Education: 1933: B.A. American University of Beirut

Farhan Shubailat (born 1911-died 1979) was a Jordanian ambassador, Minister of Defence, senator and mayor of Amman.

== Career ==
- Born into a modest family in Tafila (southern Jordan), Farhan Shubailat was sent to the English school in Salt and then obtained a scholarship that enabled him to enter the American University of Beirut, from which he graduated in 1933.
- In 1939 he was lecturer at the military academy in Baghdad, where he professed pan-Arab ideas.
- In 1946 he was chief of cabinet of King Abdullah of Jordan. Farhan Shubailat convinced King Abdullah to send his grandson Hussein to study abroad, first in Alexandria, then in England.
- In 1947 he was a careful observer of the 1947 Syrian parliamentary election.
- From 1948 to 1950 he was ambassador in Beirut (Lebanon).
- From 1951 to 1952 he was Chamberlain of King Talal of Jordan, then, after the latter's abdication, member of the regency council (1952-1953).
- From 1952 to 1955 he was mayor of Amman.
- In 1954 he was envoy in Baghdad.
- In 1955 he was Minister of Defense in the cabinet of Sa'id al-Mufti.
- From 1956 to 1957 he was ambassador in Bonn (West Germany).
- In 1958 he was ambassador in Baghdad, responsible for carrying out the unification project between Jordan and Iraq. He narrowly escaped death during the military coup of 14 July 1958.
- From 1959 to 1965 he was Ambassador in Tunis (Tunisia) with concurrent Diplomatic accreditation in Algiers (Algeria), Tripoli (Libya), 1961 in Rabat (Morocco), and 1964 in Baghdad (Iraq).
- On October 28, 1965 he was appointed as ambassador in Washington, D.C. where he was accredited from November 16, 1965 to August 28, 1967.
- From September 12, 1967 to 1971 he was ambassador in Bonn, last position before retirement.
- On December 10, 1977 a Royal Decree was issued appointing Farhan Shubeilat Senator.
- As one of the first senior officials of the Kingdom of Jordan, Ambassador Shubailat was very close to Kings Abdullah, Talal and then Hussein. Independent-minded, he was always perfectly loyal and deeply attached to the Hashemite dynasty, especially as it was in line with modern and moderate views.
- Ambassador Farhan Shubailat's son, Dr. Gaith F. Shubailat, has served in the Jordan Army Royal Medical Services, at the King Hussein Medical Center, until his retirement in 1984 in the rank of Major General. Dr. Shubailat was instrumental in creating the Jordanian Board of Medical Specialties in 1984 and he served as its first President until 1992. He was also a senator from 1993 to 1997.
