= Kemal Mehmood Homoud =

Chief of Protocol of the Jordanian Royal Palace
- In office 1952–1954

Jordanian Ambassador to Chile of Jordan to Chile
- In office 1957–1962.
- Preceded by: Issa Basil Bandak
- Succeeded by: Nicola Jaccob Kattan

Jordanian Ambassador to Iran of Jordan to Iran
- In office 1962.–1962.

Jordanian Chief of Protocol
- In office 1960.–1964.
- Succeeded by: August 8, 1991 – October 14, 1993: Muhammad Affash al-Adwan; 2005-2007: Makram Mustafa Queisi

Jordanian Ambassador to India of Jordan to India
- In office October 3, 1964 – 1968.
- Preceded by: Yousef Haikal
- Succeeded by: 2001–2006: Nabil Talhouni

Jordanian Ambassador to Iraq of Jordan to Iraq
- In office 1969–1971.
- Preceded by: 1961-1962: Wasfi al-Tal
- Succeeded by: Mohammad Quraan

Jordanian Ambassador to Arab League of Jordan to Arab League
- In office 1972–1973.
- Preceded by: Hazem Nuseibeh
- Succeeded by: Nayef Saoud Faris Al Kadi

Jordanian Ambassador to Russia of Jordan to Soviet Union
- In office March 29, 1974 – 1977.
- Preceded by: Hassan Ibrahim (Jordanian diplomat)
- Succeeded by: Hani al-Khasawinah

Jordanian Ambassador to China of Jordan to China
- In office February 1979 – 1987.
- Preceded by: Abdullah Salah
- Succeeded by: Walid al-Sa'ad al-Batayinah

Personal details
- Born: December 26, 1921 Dion, Jordan
- Spouse: Widower
- Children: Munther, Mazen Kemal Homoud, Jordan's Ambassador to London in June 2011
- Parents: Mehmood Mohemed (father); Alya Mohemed (Hindawi) H. (mother)
- Education: The Universal College in Aley, Diploma in International Relations from the University of London

Kemal Mehmood Homoud (born December 26, 1921) was a Jordanian ambassador.

== Career ==
- From 1941 to 1950 he served as officer in Royal Jordanian Army.
- From 1946 to 1950 he was military attaché in London.
- In 1950 he joined the Jordanian diplomatic service.
- From 1951 to 1952 he was employed in the Ministry of Foreign Affairs in Amman.
- From 1952 to 1954 he was Chief of Protocol of the Royal Palace.
- From 1954 to 1956 he was counselor in London.
- From 1957 to 1962 he was Chargé d'affaires in Santiago de Chile.
- In 1962 he was Chargé d'affaires in Tehran, Iran.
- From 1960 to 1964 he was Chief of Protocol of the Ministry of Foreign Affairs.
- From October 3, 1964 to 1968 he was ambassador in New Delhi with concurrent accreditation in Colombo, (Sri Lanka), Bangkok, (Thailand) and Malaysia.
- From 1969 to 1971 he was ambassador in Baghdad, Iraq.
- From 1971 to 1972 he was head of Political Department, Ministry of Foreign Affairs.
- In 1972 he was acting secretary general at the Foreign Ministry.
- From 1972 to 1973 he was ambassador to the Arab League.
- From March 29, 1974 to 1977 he was ambassador in Moscow, in the Soviet Union.
- From 1977 to February 1979 he was secretary general of the Foreign Ministry.
- From February 1979 to 1987 he was ambassador in Beijing, the People's Republic of China.
- In 1987 he retired.
