= Muhammad Affash al-Adwan =

Jordanian Ambassador

Jordanian Ambassador to Spain of Jordan to Spain
- In office 1985–1989
- Preceded by: 1951–1954: Issa Basil Bandak; 1971: Muhammad Hussain El-Farra; 1975: Taher al-Masri
- Succeeded by: Ghassam Abdel Rahim Odeh Majali

Jordanian Ambassador to Russia of Jordan to Soviet Union
- In office 1990 – August 8, 1991
- Preceded by: Hani al-Khasawinah
- Succeeded by: Ahmad Ali Mybaydeen

Jordanian Chief of Protocol
- In office August 8, 1991 – October 14, 1993
- Succeeded by: 2005-2007: Makram Mustafa Queisi

Jordanian Minister of Tourism
- In office October 14, 1993 – 1995
- Preceded by: 1984: Makram Mustafa Queisi

Jordanian Minister of Information
- In office 2001–2003.
- Preceded by: 1955 - 1956: Fawzi Al-Mulki
- Succeeded by: Majd Shweikeh

Personal details
- Born: 1943 (age 82–83) Shuneh, Irbid Governorate
- Spouse: Married in 1978 in California Natasha Razmenkov
- Children: Shima (*November 18, 2000).
- Parents: Affash Adwan (father); Sheima Saud. (mother)
- Education: Islamic Scientific College, High School, California State University (San Jose), University of Colorado, Boulder. Dipl.:B.A., M.A., Ph.D.; Leadership & Management, University of Pittsburgh, Development Claremont Graduate School,

Muhammad Affash al-Adwan (Arabic: محمد عفاش العدوان, born 1943) is a retired Jordanian Ambassador. He was Minister of Information.

== Career ==
- From 1977 to 1982 he was Vice President Jordan Valley Authority.
- From 1982 to 1985 he was Director of Office of Queen Noor of Jordan.
- From 1985 to 1989 he was Ambassador in Madrid (Spain).
- From 1990 to August 8, 1991 he was ambassador in Moscow with concurrent non resident Diplomatic accreditation in Helsinki (Finland) and Warsaw. Poland.
- From August 8, 1991 to October 14, 1993 he was Jordanian Chief of Protocol.
- From October 14, 1993 to 1995 he was Minister of tourism and Antiquities.
- From 2001 to 2003 he was Minister of State for Political Affairs and Information.
