= Jordan–United States relations =

- Jordan: United States

Diplomatic mission
- Embassy of Jordan, Washington, D.C.: Embassy of the United States, Amman

Envoy
- Her Excellency Ambassador Dina Kawar: Charge d'affaires Peter Shea

Jordan has been a very close ally of the United States for decades, dating back to the establishment of bilateral relations between the two countries in 1949. The country was named a major non-NATO ally of the U.S. in 1996.

== History ==
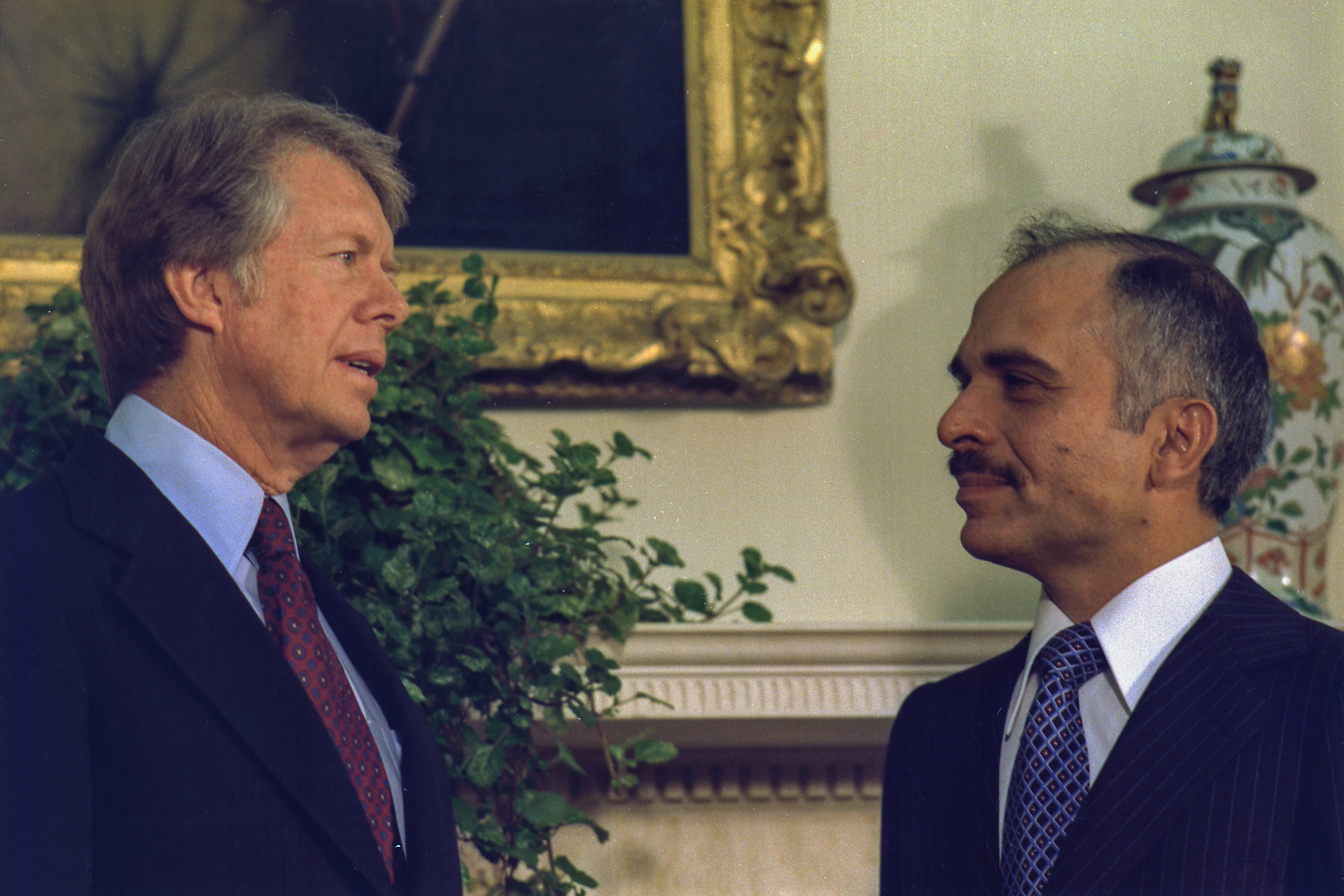
King Hussein meeting US President Jimmy Carter in Washington in 1977

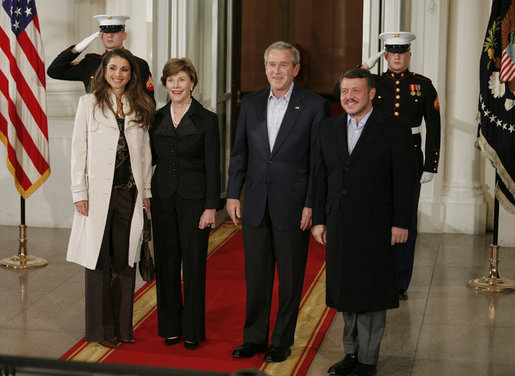
King Abdullah II and Queen Rania with US President George W. Bush, Washington, D.C., 6 March 2007

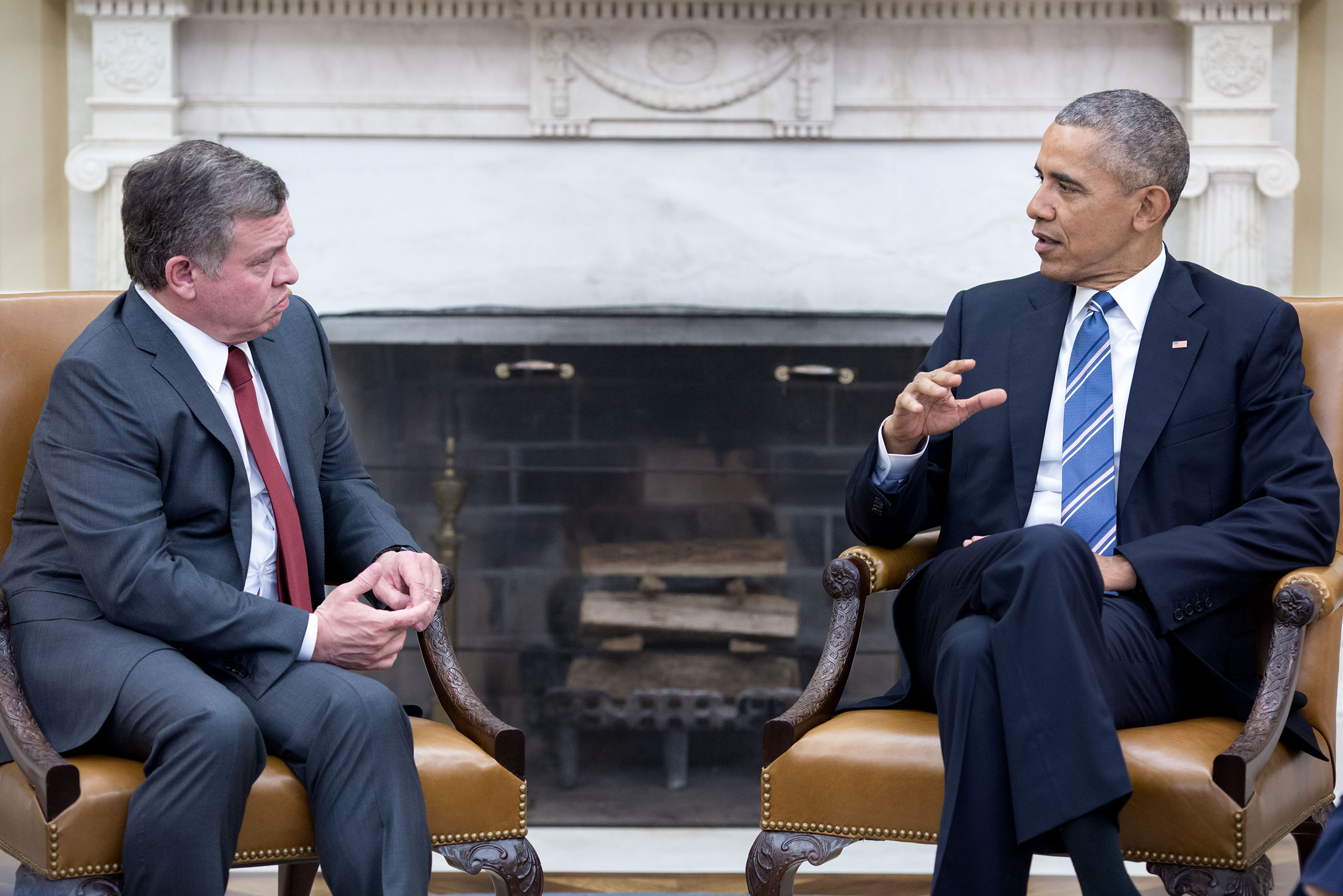
Barack Obama holds a bilateral meeting with King Abdullah II of Jordan in the Oval Office, 24 February 2016

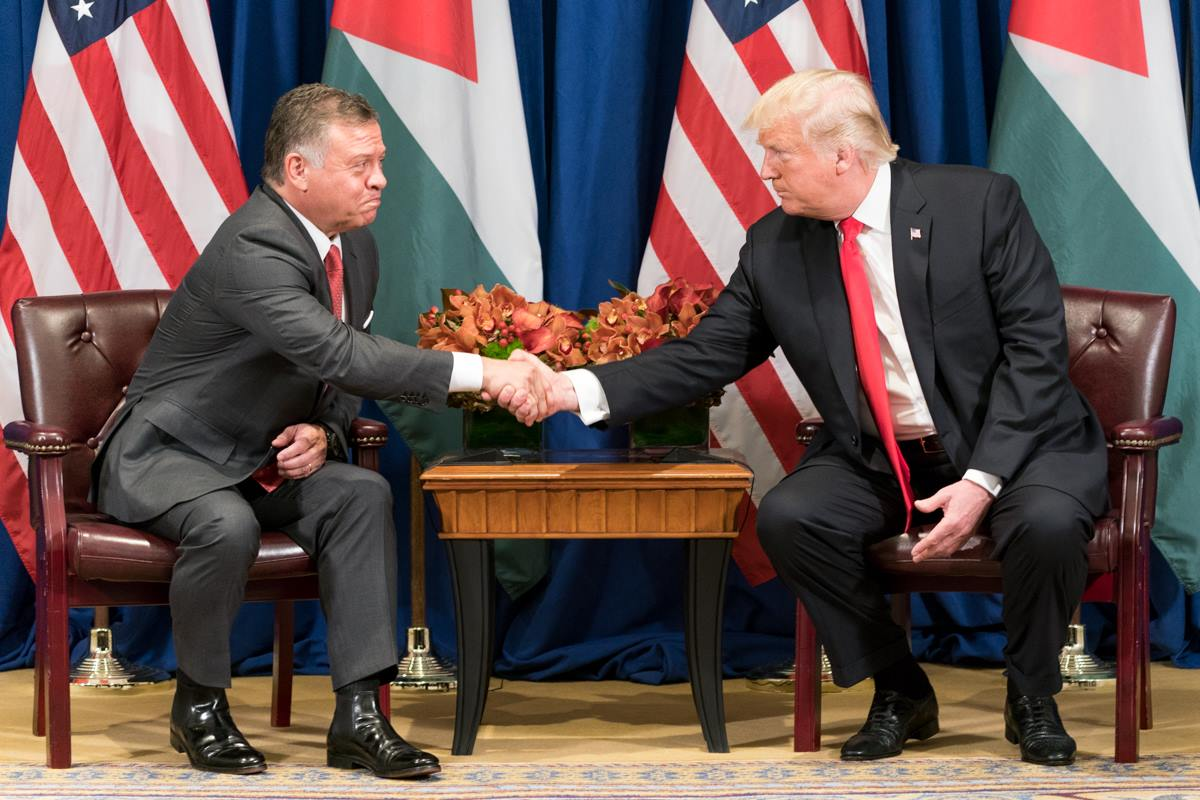
King Abdullah II with US President Donald Trump in October 2017

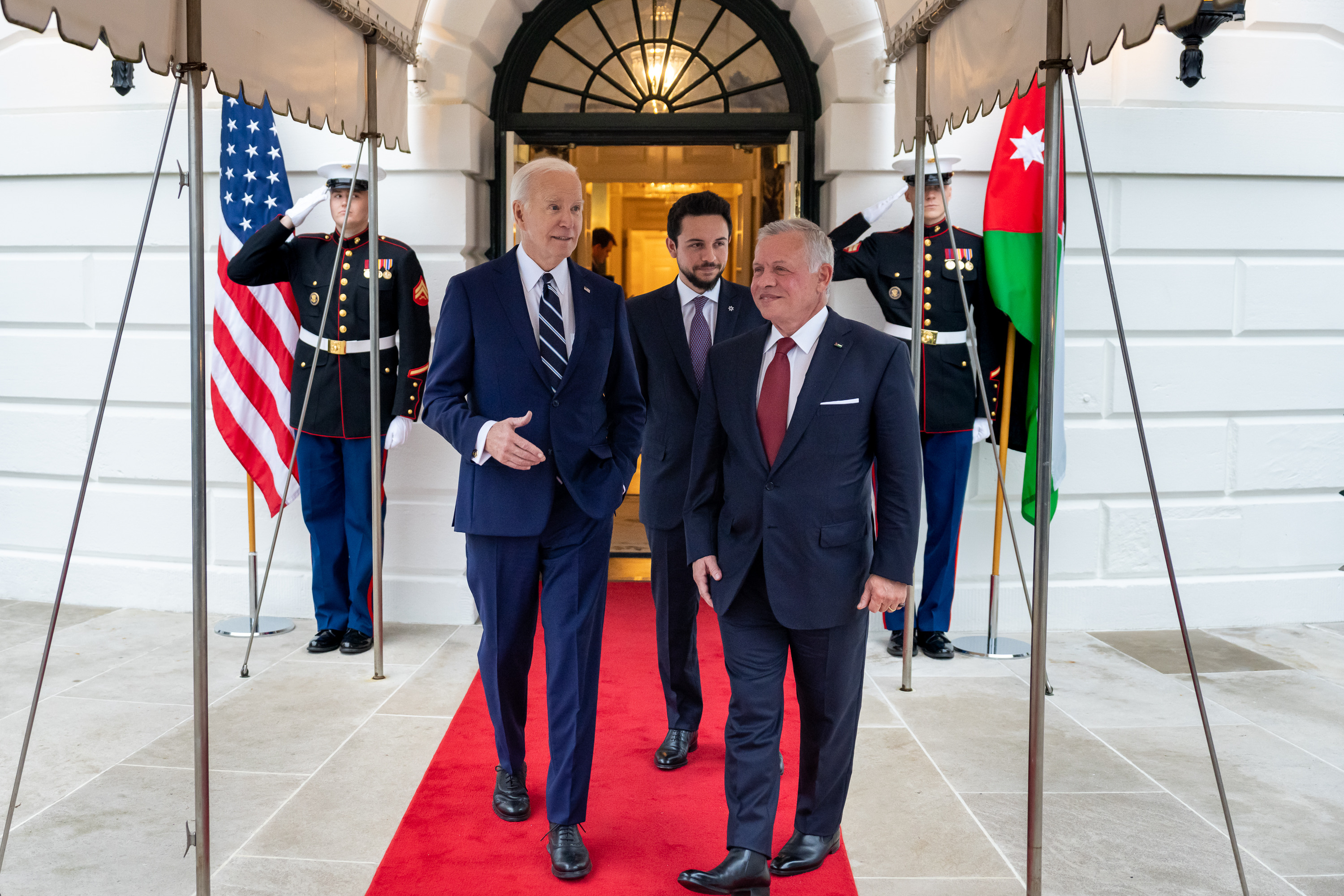
King Abdullah II and Crown Prince Hussein with US President Joe Biden in February 2024

Relations between the U.S. and Jordan have been close for over four decades. U.S. policy seeks to reinforce Jordan's commitment to peace, stability, and moderation. The peace process and Jordan's opposition to terrorism parallel and indirectly assist wider U.S. interests. Accordingly, through economic and military assistance and through close political cooperation, the United States has helped Jordan maintain its stability and prosperity.

Since its inception, Jordan has relied on sponsorship from major Western powers. Great Britain filled this role until the late 1940s; the U.S. stepped in during the 1950s. During the Gulf War of 1991, Jordan tried to solve the situation in an Arabian framework that the U.S. interpreted as pro-Iraq. As a result, the U.S. started monitoring the country's only ocean port, Aqaba, to prevent any supplies from reaching Iraq. Jordan suffered financial hardships for this, and attitudes toward the U.S. only improved during the Madrid Conference of 1991, where the U.S. deemed Jordanian participation as essential.

King Abdullah advised Washington against the 2003 Iraq War, but later allegedly gave the invading coalition some degree of covert and tacit support, despite the overwhelming opinion of his public. The Jordanian government publicly opposed the war against Iraq. The King stressed to the United States and European Union that a diplomatic solution, in accordance with UN Security Council (UNSC) resolutions 1284 (1999) and 1409 (2002), was the only appropriate model for resolving the conflict between Iraq and the UN. In August 2002 he told The Washington Post that an attempt to invade Iraq would be a "tremendous mistake" and that it could "throw the whole area into turmoil".

In February 2023, King Adbullah and Crown Prince Hussein met with U.S. President Biden at the White House in Washington, D.C. The President reaffirmed that the US would support Jordan’s "security and economic prosperity". It was Abdullah's third meeting with President Biden after July 2021 and July 2022.

On 29 April 2023, a United States bipartisan Congressional Delegation led by Speaker of the House Kevin McCarthy visited Jordan and met with King Abdullah and Crown Prince Hussein. McCarthy stated he chose Jordan as the first country to visit as Speaker of the House because Jordan is "a strategic ally in the Middle East and share[s] America’s commitment to peace, prosperity – and most importantly – stability in the region." The historic friendship and means to increase cooperation between the countries were discussed in the meeting. King Abdullah expressed his gratitude for the United States' support of Jordan and highlighted the necessity for further efforts to resolve the Israeli-Palestinian conflict. He put emphasis on the two-state solution which would result in an independent Palestinian State on the 1967 state lines with East Jerusalem as the capital. During the Gaza war, President Biden and King Abdullah II met several times discussing humanitarian assistance to Gaza and another ceasefire.

=== Programs ===
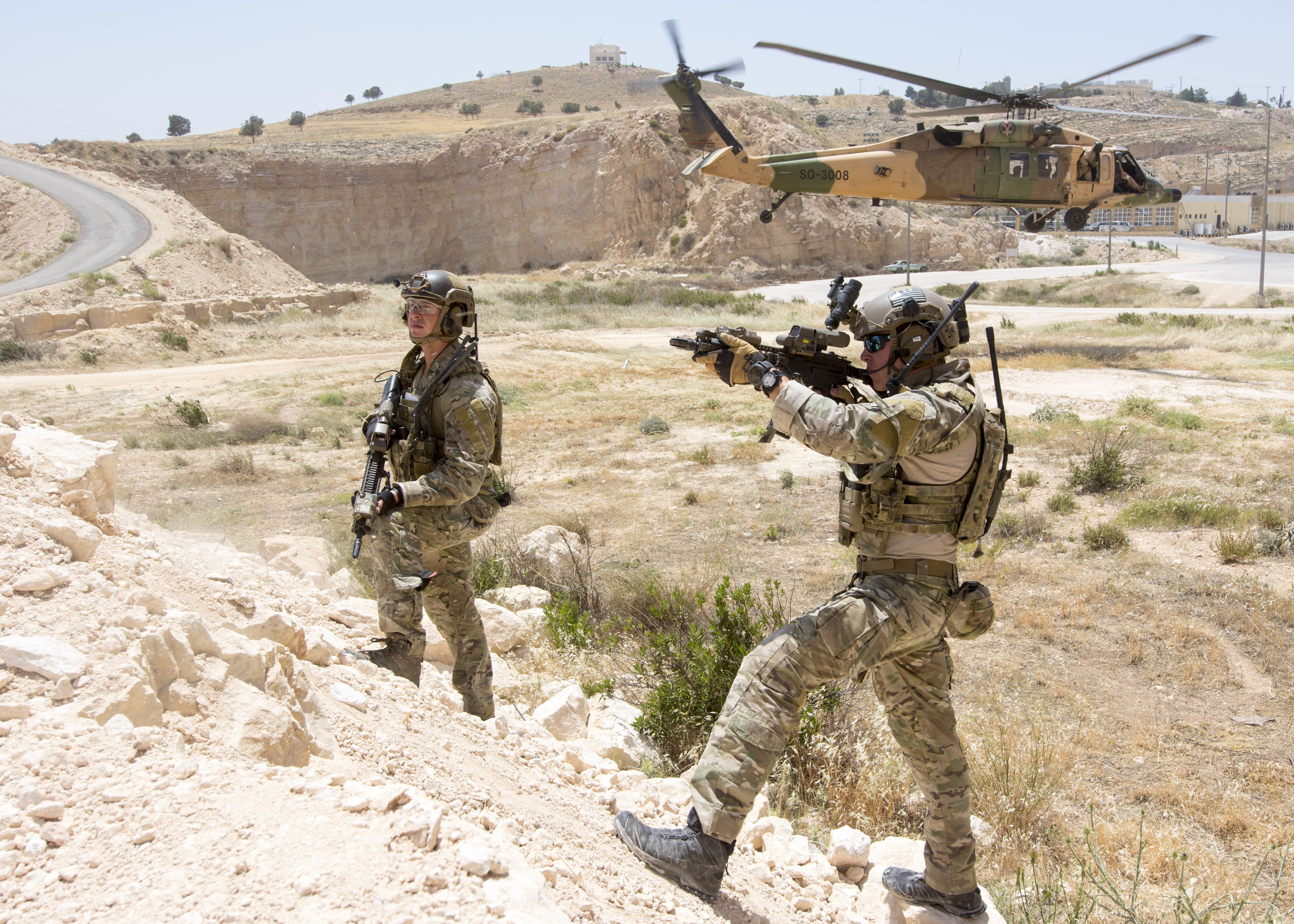
U.S. Air Force Special Tactics Commandos training with Jordanian special operations forces

Since 1952, the United States has provided Jordan with economic assistance totaling more than $14 billion ($1.3 billion in loans, and $7.7 billion in grants), including funds for development projects, health care, education, construction to increase water availability, support for microeconomic policy shifts toward a more completely free market system, and both grant and loan acquisition of U.S. agriculture commodities. These programs have been successful and have contributed to Jordanian stability while strengthening the bilateral relationship. U.S. military assistance—provision of material and training—is designed to meet Jordan's legitimate defense needs, including preservation of border integrity and regional stability. Jordan signed a Threshold Agreement with the Millennium Challenge Corporation (MCC) in October 2006, and was subsequently deemed by the MCC to be eligible for a Compact Agreement in recognition of the country's progress on economic, social, and political reform indicators.

As of 2013, the United States had given Jordan's intelligence agency, the General Intelligence Directorate (the G.I.D), over $3.3 billion in aid over the previous five years, with another $200 million pledged for the Syrian refugee crisis. The G.I.D is a close partner of the American Central Intelligence Agency (CIA). In 2014, due to concerns over Jordan's fragile economy being stretched by the influx of Syrian refugees, President Obama announced he would seek $1 billion in loan guarantees in addition to the $1.25 billion Congress approved in 2013.

=== Human Rights promotion ===
Since the deadly terrorist attacks of 9/11, the United States has focused on security and stability in the region, while simultaneously fighting the war on terror. As military training and intelligence operations became a higher priority after 2001, the Bush Administration revised the nation's rhetoric on human rights promotion and democracy in the region, despite the turbulent political climate of the Middle East. In an effort to move toward a more interventionist foreign policy, Bush created a specific freedom agenda. He strongly encouraged "the spread of freedom as the great alternative to the terrorists' ideology of hatred." Based on American ideals of democracy and liberty, the agenda emphasized the way the continued spread of freedoms can combat the conditions and opposition that breed extremism. The United States' strong push for action and democratic reform, especially from 2001 to 2008, resulted in the refinement of technical programs and an increase in democracy assistance. Issues of gender empowerment, legislative reform, emphasis on elections, and support for educational and developmental programs have risen to the forefront.

Reform/action taken for human rights promotion and democratization in Jordan include:

- 2,800 troops deployed for protection of the border
- New leadership for the Ministry of Interior, Jordanian Armed Forces, and the General Intelligence
- Democracy assistance for programs such as Jordan School Expansion Project, Community Engagement Project, Local Enterprise Support Activity, and Workforce Development Program
- Push to pass proposal for the number of female representatives to grow to 23, one representative for each electoral district

== United States embassy ==
The U.S. embassy is located in Abdoun, Amman. Principal U.S. officials in Jordan include:

- Charge d'affaires Peter Shea

== Jordanian embassy ==
The Jordan embassy is located in Washington, D.C.

- Ambassador Dina Kawar
- Deputy Chief of Mission Ali Al Arabiyat

== Friends of Jordan Caucus ==
In the United States Congress, the Friends of Jordan Caucus was launched 6 March 2009, to support a strong relationship between Jordan and the United States and to facilitate the exchange of ideas between Members of the House of Representatives and Jordanian officials. The caucus was first co-chaired by Congressmen Schiff and Boustany, and Congressmen Baird (R-IN) and Fortenberry (R-NE) served as the first vice chairs.

== See also ==
- Foreign relations of Jordan
- Foreign relations of the United States
- Embassy of Jordan, Washington, D.C.
- Embassy of the United States, Amman
- List of ambassadors of Jordan to the United States
- List of ambassadors of the United States to Jordan
