= Omar al-Bitar =

Palestinian politician (1880-1946)

Omar al-Bitar OBE
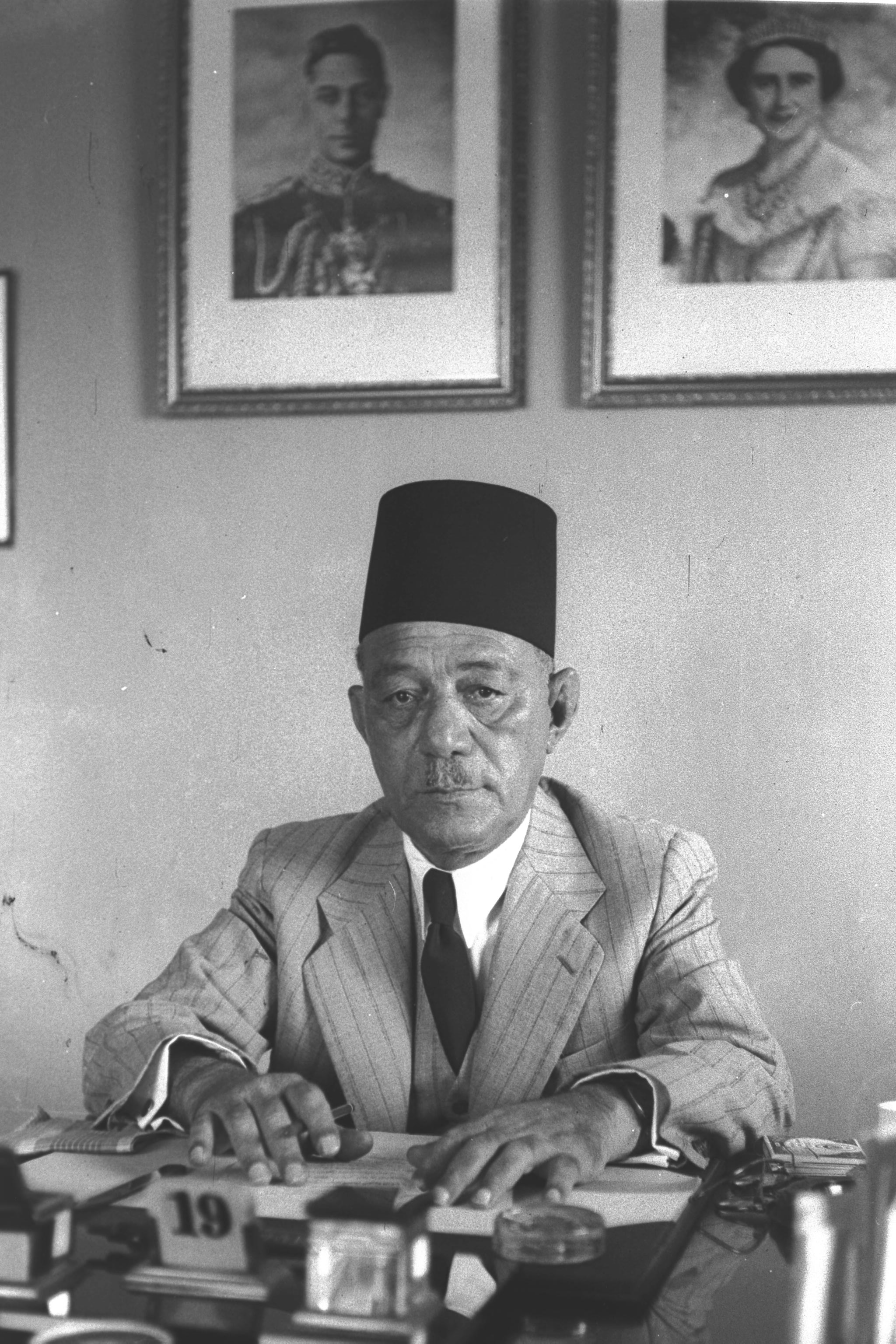
- al-Bitar in 1941

Mayor of Jaffa
- In office 1908–1915
- In office June 1941 – June 1945
- Preceded by: Abd al-Rauf al-Bitar
- Succeeded by: Yousef Haikal

Personal details
- Born: 1880
- Died: 1946 (aged 65–66) Giv'at Aliyah

Omar al-Bitar (Arabic: عمر البيطار; also Romanized as Omar el-Bitar) OBE (1880–1946) was a Palestinian politician who served as the mayor of Jaffa during the British colonial period.

He was described as "a quintessential symbol of Jaffa in his time."

== Biography ==
Omar al-Bitar was the son of a wealthy family in Jaffa. His family rose to prominence and influence in the 19th century. At the end of the second decade of the 20th century, the Bitar family from Jaffa stood out on the lists of large landowners in Palestine.

In 1908, Al-Bitar was appointed as the head of the municipal council by the Qayyim, with whom he maintained close ties. In 1915, al-Bitar was dismissed by the Qayyim Arif Bek, and exiled to Damascus along with 45 notables from Jaffa.

With the beginning of the British rule, he was suspected of pro-Ottoman activity and was deported to Egypt. He was allowed to return in early 1919. In September 1919, he was elected president of the "Muslim-Christian Association in Jaffa", one of the first political organizations in the Arab national awakening in the country. Similar associations were established shortly thereafter in other cities, and their leaders gathered in December 1919 in Haifa and founded the Arab Executive Committee. Al-Bitar served as president of the association in Jaffa until the end of 1929, when he was ousted by the extremist wing. He was a member of the executive committee elected at the fourth to seventh conferences of the Arab-Palestinian Congress (1921–1928). At the fourth Congress, which convened in June 1921 in Haifa, he was elected Deputy Chairman of the Executive Committee, a position he held until the seventh Congress in 1928.

During the events of 1921 in Jaffa, Al-Bitar was called, along with two of the city's dignitaries, to a meeting with Tel Aviv dignitaries to calm the situation, which was held by order of the governor of the Jaffa district on May 2. After a joint meeting of the community's dignitaries on May 5, 1921, he was sent with a British intelligence officer to Tulkarm and Qalqilya to stop spreading rumors that Jews were killing Arabs in Jaffa.

In late 1923, the Muslim-Christian Association in Jaffa began to disintegrate due to the Jaffa Municipality's agreement to accept Pinhas Rutenberg's electrical plant on its territory. The municipality's agreement to receive electricity from Rutenberg's plant aroused the anger of various extremist elements, and since Mayor Assem Bey Said was an associate and ally of al-Bitar, the anger also stuck with him. The powerful Dajani family seized the opportunity and launched an attack on him to undermine his position. This conflict began the process of disintegration of the Muslim-Christian Association in Jaffa, its division into two rival camps and a decline in its previous status. In the midst of this process, the president of the Al-Beitar Association moved to the opposition camp (the Mu'arada) led by Raghib al-Nashashibi, thus allowing it to penetrate his city, which until then had been the stronghold of the supporters of the Arab Executive Committee. In 1925, he already took part in the opposition petition submitted to the Minister of Colonies.

After the rapprochement between the Nashashibis and the Husseinis following the events of 1929, Al-Bitar established the "Liberal Party" in 1930.

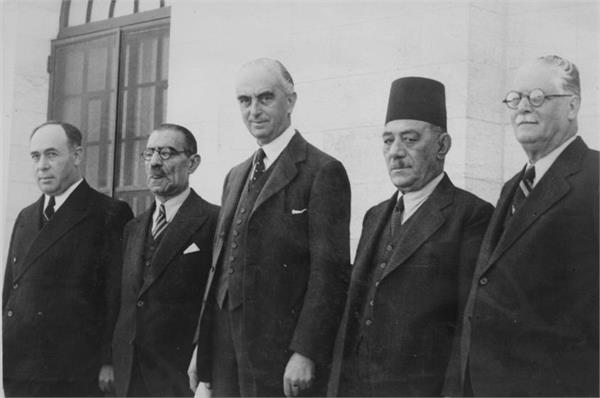
Omar al-Bitar, second from right, here seen with (from left to right) Israel Rokach, Mustafa al-Khalidi, Harold MacMichael, and, on el-Bitar's right, Shabtai Levy.

In June 1932, a committee began operating to manage the "National Fund" company, whose goal was to "save land" from being transferred to Jews, and Al-Bitar was a member of the committee on behalf of the opposition.

In October 1933, Al-Bitar was one of three opposition leaders and members of the Arab Executive Committee who supported the demonstrations held in Palestine that month.

In December 1934, the opposition was re-organized within the framework of the "National Defense Party" led by Raghib al-Nashashibi, and al-Bitar was among its founders. At the party's founding conference on December 2, 1934, he was elected one of the 12 members of its Central Committee.

In 1935, the "Kufat Ha'uma" company was re-founded, and Al-Bitar was a member of the company's board.

In 1939, the Jaffa Municipal Council was dissolved and Omar's brother, Abd al-Rauf al-Bitar, was appointed mayor as the head of the Committee. Abd al-Rauf died on June 16, 1941, and Omar was reappointed mayor.

In June 1943, he received the rank of Officer of the Order of the British Empire.

In February 1945, several members of the municipality resigned from it, undermining its functioning, after the district governor ordered the Jaffa Municipality to immediately pay the debt owed to the Tel Aviv Municipality for services that the latter provided to the Florentine and Shapira neighborhoods as part of an agreement between the municipalities. As a result, Omar submitted his resignation to High Commissioner John Vereker on March 12, 1945. At the end of the month, a new municipal committee was formed, headed by Al-Bitar, who went on a three-month leave, during which the municipality was managed by Yousef Haikal, who served as acting mayor. In June 1945, Al-Bitar resigned once again and Haikal was appointed as mayor.

After his resignation, he abandoned politics and public life.

== Death ==
Al-Bitar died on June 16, 1946, exactly five years after his brother's death, and was buried next to him in the cemetery in Jabalia (Giv'at Aliyah).
