= List of ambassadors of Jordan to China =

Coordinates: 39.945180°N 116.459282°E

Ambassador of Jordan to China
- Incumbent; Hussam Al Husseini since November 22, 2019
- Inaugural holder: Azmi Nashachibi
- Formation: December 20, 1958

The Jordanian Ambassador in Beijing is the representative of the government in Amman (Jordan) next the government of the People's Republic of China and is concurrently accredited in Pyongyang.

== List of representatives ==
Diplomatic agrément/Diplomatic accreditation	ambassador	Observations	List of kings of Jordan	Premier of the Republic of China	Term end
August 1957		Establishment of diplomatic relations with the government in Taipei.	Hussein of Jordan	Yu Hung-Chun	
December 20, 1958	Azmi Nashachibi	On November 7, 1958, Azmi Nashachibi, the first Jordanian Ambassador to China, The Kingdom of Jordan has appointed Azmi Nashachibi, its Vice Foreign Minister, to be first Jordanian Ambassador to the Republic of China, the Foreign Ministry disclosed. Free China entered into diplomatic relations with the Kingdom of Jordan in August, 1957	Hussein of Jordan	Chen Cheng	
May 10, 1964	Yousef Haikal		Hussein of Jordan	Yen Chia-kan	
March 10, 1969	Kamel Al-Sharif		Hussein of Jordan	Yen Chia-kan	April 7, 1971
April 18, 1971	Motassom Al-Bilbeissi	Bilbisy	Hussein of Jordan	Yen Chia-kan	
1975	Fathi Yasin	General	Hussein of Jordan	Chiang Ching-kuo	November 1976
January 1977	Riad Sabri	(*1929) Feb 6, 1977 - Riad Sabri, a 48-year-old career diplomat and the newly appointed Jordanian ambassador to the Republic of China, arrived in Taipei January	Hussein of Jordan	Chiang Ching-kuo	

Diplomatic agrément/Diplomatic accreditation	ambassador	Observations	List of kings of Jordan	Premier of the People's Republic of China	Term end
April 14, 1977		Establishment of diplomatic relations with the government in Beijing	Hussein of Jordan	Hua Guofeng	
1977	Abdullah Salah	June 6, 1973: ambassador in Washington, D.C.	Hussein of Jordan	Hua Guofeng	1978
February 1979	Kemal Mehmood Homoud		Hussein of Jordan	Hua Guofeng	1985
November 3, 1987	Walid al-Sa'ad al-Batayinah	Walid Al-Sadd Al-Batayneh	Hussein of Jordan	Li Peng	1991
November 15, 1993	Samir Issa Al-Naouri	On September 30, 2002 he was appointed ambassador to Manila	Hussein of Jordan	Li Peng	September 30, 2002
2002	Rajab Mohammed Sukayri	2005 ambassador to Canberra	Abdullah II of Jordan	Zhu Rongji	2004
2004	Anmar AbdelHalim Al Nimer Al-Hmoud	1998 Ambassador to Lebanon	Abdullah II of Jordan	Wen Jiabao	2012
May 23, 2012	Yahya Qaralleh		Abdullah II of Jordan	Wen Jiabao	June 2018
November 22, 2019	Hussam Al Husseini		Abdullah II of Jordan	Li Keqiang	
