= 2026 Iranian strikes on Jordan =

Retaliatory strikes in the 2026 Iran war

- Part of the 2026 Iran war
- 2026 Iranian strikes on Jordan (Jordan) Map of Jordan
Date	28 February 2026 – present
Location	Jordan
Result	Ongoing

Belligerents
Iran; Islamic Resistance in Iraq; Saraya Awliya al-Dam; Kataib Jund al-Karrar; Rijal al-Bas al-Shadid	Jordan; United States; Israel; Defensive/precautionary: United Kingdom; Germany

Units involved
- see order of battle

Casualties and losses
(Iran) At least 108 drones and ballistic missiles intercepted	(United States) 3 service members killed, 29 injured (United States) 1 MQ-9 Reaper drone destroyed, "significant number" of Black Hawk helicopters damaged
- (Jordan) 29 civilians injured

On 28 February 2026, during the 2026 Iran war, Iran launched a series of drone and missile strikes targeting American and allied military facilities across the Middle East. Several projectiles crossed into Jordanian airspace and were intercepted by the Jordanian Armed Forces and United States Armed Forces operating in the country.

== Prelude ==
Jordan had previously been involved in regional air defense operations during the escalation of the 2024 Iran–Israel conflict. On 13 April 2024, Iran launched drones and missiles toward Israel in retaliation for an Israeli airstrike on the Iranian consulate in Damascus earlier that month.

During the attack, the Royal Jordanian Air Force intercepted multiple Iranian drones and missiles that entered or crossed Jordanian airspace while heading toward Israel. Jordan coordinated with the United States, the United Kingdom, France and other regional partners in a multinational effort to intercept Iranian projectiles.

Jordan also participated in regional air defense operations during the Twelve-Day War in June 2025. Iranian missiles and drones launched toward Israel crossed Jordanian airspace, and the Royal Jordanian Air Force intercepted several projectiles.

== Incidents ==
External videos
- Iran Obliterates $300m U.S. Thaad Radar In Jordan

=== February ===
28 February

Jordanian air defenses intercepted 49 drones and missiles, including 13 ballistic missiles, that entered the country's airspace during the wider Iranian attacks across the region.

=== March ===
1 March

Iranian missiles and drones struck a Bundeswehr field camp in eastern Jordan.

2 March

The US embassy in Amman announced that all personnel had temporarily departed the embassy compound as a precaution following a reported security threat.

3 March

Jordanian air defenses intercepted one missile near Muwaffaq Salti Air Base in Azraq.

4 March

Two drones crashed in Jordanian territory, one of them in Azraq, wounding a girl and damaging nearby homes. An Iraqi militia group, Saraya Awliya al-Dam, claimed responsibility for a drone attack targeting Jordan, stating that the strike was carried out in support of Iran during the ongoing conflict.

6 March

U.S. officials moved to replace a radar system associated with the Terminal High Altitude Area Defense (THAAD) missile defense system in Jordan after it was damaged during the attacks. The Rijal al-Bas al-Shadid, a group affiliated with the Islamic Resistance in Iraq, claimed attacks on the Muwaffaq Salti Air Base and an unspecified "vital target", with the Shahed-101 Kamikaze Drones.

7 March

Jordanian military officials said that Iran launched 119 missiles and drones directly targeting sites in Jordan over the course of a week during the conflict, including 60 missiles and 59 drones. According to the Jordanian Armed Forces, 108 of the projectiles were intercepted by the country's air defense systems, while debris from intercepted weapons caused minor injuries and limited damage.

8 March

A Syrian pro-Iranian group called Kataib Jund al-Karrar claimed an attack against Tower 22, a US military base in Rukban, eastern Jordan.

14 March

During the second week of the conflict, 85 missiles and drones were launched from Iran toward Jordan, according to the Jordanian military. The Royal Jordanian Air Force intercepted 79 of the projectiles, while five drones and one missile landed inside Jordanian territory.

19 March

It was reported by Bloomberg that an US General Atomics MQ-9 Reaper was destroyed in the ground in Jordan by Iranian attacks.

25 March

Jordan's military said its air force shot down five missiles and one drone launched from Iran over the last 24 hours. Media spokesperson said that in those 24 hours there were 17 reports of shrapnel and projectiles across Jordan.

27 March

Jordan urged Iraq to take measures to halt cross-border attacks by Iran-aligned factions targeting its territory, emphasizing the need to prevent further escalation and protect regional stability, through government spokesperson and Minister of Government Communication Mohammad Al-Momani.

28 March

Reports indicated that Iran-aligned Iraqi militias carried out strikes targeting five major airbases in Jordan.

30 March

Kataib Jund al-Karrar, a Syrian pro-Iranian group, claimed to have attacked Muwaffaq Salti Air Base with drones.

=== June ===
10 June

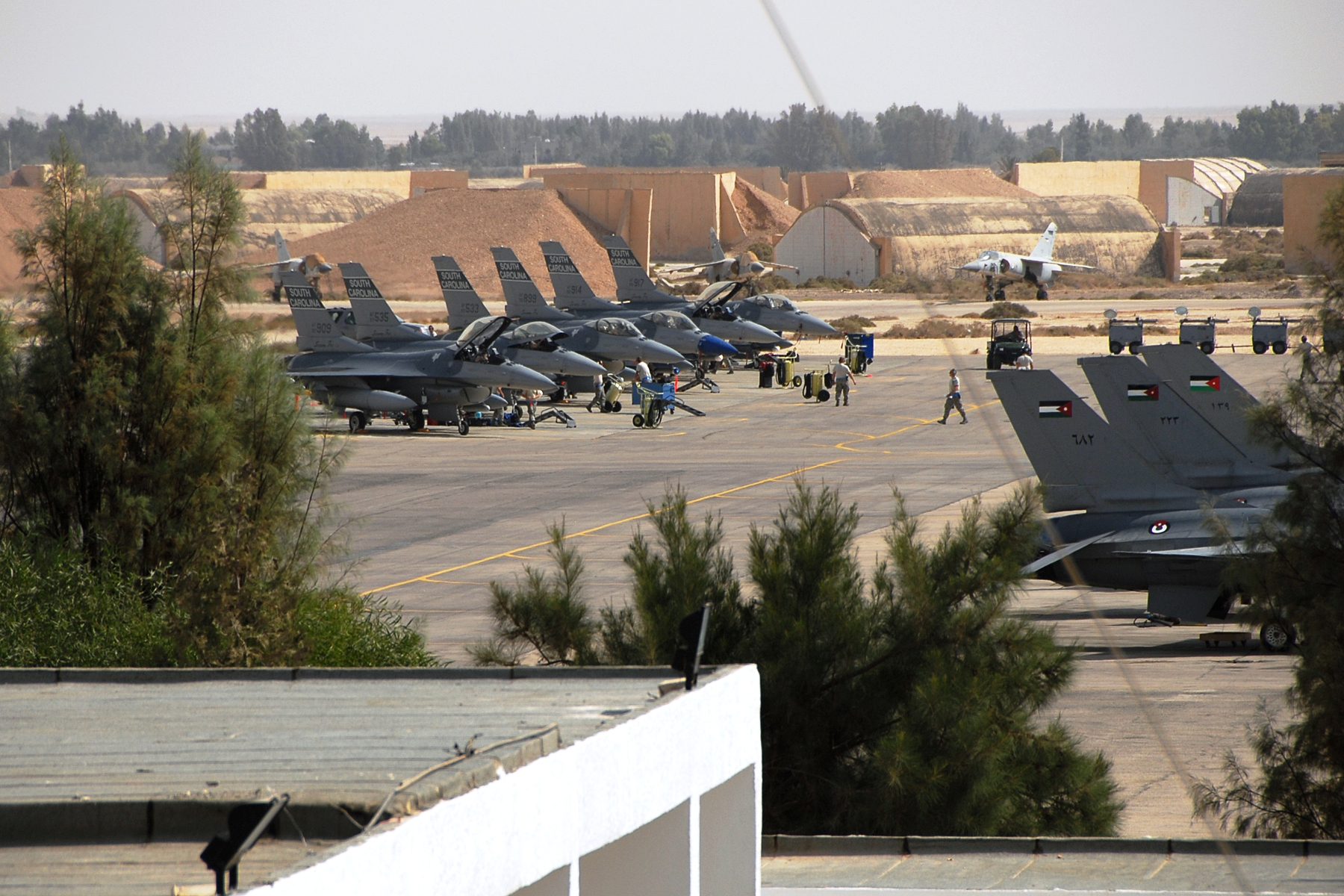
Muwaffaq Salti Air Base, Jordan

Iran targeted the Muwaffaq Salti Air Base in Jordan, along with other US bases in Kuwait and Bahrain after American strikes on the Strait of Hormuz, following the downing of an American Apache helicopter by Iran. The IRGC said long-range missiles destroyed four targets in Muwaffaq Salti airbase, including hangars and command centers, while Jordan said all five missiles were shot down.

11 June

The Jordanian military stated that its air defenses had intercepted and destroyed 20 missiles launched from Iran toward the Azraq area, reporting no casualties or material damage. Iran's Revolutionary Guard Corps announced that it had targeted a base housing American fighter jets and some military facilities in Jordan. According to a statement from the Revolutionary Guards, this air base and US military command centers were targeted with 12 ballistic missiles. IRGC reported that it had targeted the mentioned base in Jordan that hosts American F-15, F-35 and F-16 fighter jets in response to US attacks on Iran.

=== July ===
9 July

Iran launched 10 ballistic missiles at the Muwaffaq Salti Air Base in Jordan, according to the Iranian Revolutionary Guards, while Jordan said its air defenses intercepted eight of the missiles, with no casualties or damage reported.

12 July

Iran claimed to have targeted critical military infrastructure and facilities at Prince Hassan Air Base in Jordan, destroying the base's command and control center and the hangars for MQ9 drones with several ballistic missiles.

13 July

Jordan's Armed Forces said its air defense systems intercepted and shot down four Iranian missiles that had entered the country's airspace.

16 July

Jordan's Armed Forces said they intercepted eight Iranian missiles that entered the country's airspace, adding that no casualties or property damage were reported.

17 July

Jordan's Armed Forces said air defenses intercepted and destroyed three Iranian missiles targeting the kingdom, with no injuries or material damage were reported. IRGC claimed that it had targeted U.S. military aircraft stationed in Jordan with ballistic missiles and drones, saying it had destroyed several refueling aircraft and fighter jets and damaged others. The attack was reportedly directed at U.S. forces at Muwaffaq Salti Air Base near Azraq, Jordan.

The United States Central Command (CENTCOM) later reported that two U.S. service members were "killed in action" while defending against the attack, one remained missing, and four other U.S. service members were medically evacuated to hospitals in Jordan before later being discharged.

18 July

Jordan's Armed Forces announced that they had intercepted 10 Iranian missiles that entered the country's airspace overnight, reporting no casualties or property damage and stating that Royal Engineering Corps teams had been deployed to clear missile debris.

19 July

The Islamic Revolutionary Guard Corps said that several American aircraft had been struck as part of a ballistic missile attack targeting King Hussein International Airport, near Aqaba, resulting in "severe damage" to multiple planes. Israeli sources said that an Iranian missile had been intercepted by an American Aegis Ballistic Missile Defense System with remaining fragments landing north of Eilat, just across the Israel–Jordan border, after being shot down using Israel's Iron Dome system.

20 July

Iran's Islamic Revolution Guard Corps (IRGC) said that its forces earlier in the day had launched missile and drone strikes against U.S. assets and facilities in Jordan (and Kuwait) in retaliation.

21 July

The IRGC also said it destroyed a missile defence radar and an F-15 fighter jet at a US military base in Jordan. Tehran said the attack aimed to disable the radar before launching wider missile and drone strikes. Tehran said the operation sought to remove radar coverage ahead of wider missile and drone attacks.

22 July

The Jordanian army said its air defenses intercepted and destroyed four of six missiles, while the remaining two landed in remote, uninhabited areas without causing casualties or damage.

24 July

Jordan's military reported intercepting seven missiles and six drones launched from Iran, adding that the incident caused no casualties or damage.

27 July

The Jordanian Armed Forces announced that they had shot down two drones that violated Jordanian airspace over the eastern desert.

29 July

The Jordanian Armed Forces announced that air defence systems intercepted and destroyed five missiles launched from Iran toward Jordan. A senior American official said Iran had fired missiles at a US base in Jordan.

=== August ===
31 August

In response to the US air attack on Larak Island, the Iranian Revolutionary Guard Corps Air Force retaliated by launching ballistic missiles at the technical infrastructure, maintenance and fighter jet site at the King Hussein and Azraq air bases in Jordan in a joint drone-missile operation. According to a report by the Iranian military forces, these attacks "destroyed technical and repair infrastructure as well as enemy fighter jet deployment positions" and caused "heavy losses." According to Mehr News Agency, citing Russia Today, the Jordanian army issued a statement confirming the entry of a wave of missiles into the country's airspace. At the same time, the American network Fox News also reported a missile attack on a location where US military forces are stationed in Jordan. Mehr News Agency: ...The country's army and Western media confirmed the arrival of missiles and the targeting of bases.

=== September ===
1 September

In response to the Kohstak attack, Iran targeted Camp Titin, a US naval base near the Gulf of Aqaba, and Prince Hassan Air Base in Jordan (home to RQ-4 and MQ-9 drones), which Iran said resulted in the destruction of several aircraft.

2 September

On 2 September 2026, the Islamic Revolutionary Guard Corps (IRGC) announced that it had carried out missile and drone operations against American positions and bases in Jordan, (also in Bahrain, and Iraq) in response to the US attacks. This was one of the most extensive military responses by Tehran since the ceasefire began.

9 September

In response to US targeting an Iranian oil tanker in the Strait of Hormuz, Iran launched an attack consisted of 20 ballistic missiles on the Muwaffaq Salti Air Base. The US response included firing 60 to 70 Patriot interceptors and more than a dozen THAAD interceptors, according to a WSJ report. Interception was made more difficult by Iran's use of maneuvering tactics and cluster munitions. No casualties were reported, but several aircraft were hit. A Fairchild Republic A-10 Thunderbolt II was hit and left with a missing wing in the strike. Eight F-15s sustained minor damage during an incident but were repaired and returned to service.

== Impact ==
Based on satellite image analysis of the Muwaffaq Salti Air Base, BBC Verify has confirmed the destruction of one American AN/TPY-2 radar (a main component of the THAAD air defence) in March 2026, and damages to buildings and structures, including possible drone and aircraft hangars and facilities, during July 2026. Damages are also observed to the Tower 22 base during July 2026.

According to Iranian media, quoted by Al-Mayadeen: Iran's attacks on US base in Jordan were heavy, painful and damaging.

Fresh satellite imagery has sparked controversy after reportedly showing damage to an aircraft hangar at Jordan's Muwaffaq Salti Air Base following Iran's missile attack.

== See also ==
- Attacks on the United States
