= Hasan Abu Nimah =

Jordanian political commentator

- حسن أبو نعمة

Jordanian Ambassador to Belgium of Jordan to Belgium
- In office 1978 July 21, 1980 – 1990
- Preceded by: Taher al-Masri
- Succeeded by: Prince Hassan bin Talal

Jordanian Ambassador to Italy of Jordan to Italy
- In office 1990–1995
- Preceded by: 1972–1974: Hazem Nuseibeh
- Succeeded by: February 26, 2012 Zaid Mufleh Faleh Lozi

Jordanian Permanent Representative to the United Nations in New York City of Jordan to United Nations
- In office September 22, 1995 – January 1, 2000
- Preceded by: Adnan Abu-Odeh
- Succeeded by: Prince Zeid bin Ra'ad

Personal details
- Born: September 11, 1935 (age 90) Battir
- Education: Al ummah college Bethlehem, American University of Beirut.

Hasan Abu Nimah (born September 11, 1935) is a political commentator of The Jordan Times and retired Jordanian Ambassador.

== Career ==
- He was employed as political commentator at the Amman Broadcasting Service and lecturer at the Teacher Training Centre in Ramallah.
- From 1967 to 1970 he was third secretary of the embassy in Baghdad (Iraq).
- From 1970 to 1972 he was first secretary of the embassy in Washington, D.C.
- From 1972 to 1973 he was employed in the Foreign Ministry in Amman.
- From 1973 to 1977 he was counselor of the embassy in London.
- From 1978 to 1990 he was ambassador in Brussels with concurrent Diplomatic accreditation in The Hague and the European Community.
- From 1990 to 1995 he was ambassador in Rome.
- From 1995 to 2000 he was Permanent Representative next to the Headquarters of the United Nations.
