= Baha Toukan =

Jordanian ambassador

Baha ud-din Toukan
- بهاء الدين طوقان

Jordanian Ambassador to the Lebanon
- In office 1948–1948
- Succeeded by: 1957–1958: Abdelmunim al-Rifai

Jordanian Ambassador to Egypt
- In office 1948–1951
- Preceded by: Fawzi Al-Mulki
- Succeeded by: Awni Abd al-Hadi

Jordanian Ambassador to Turkey
- In office 1951–1954
- Preceded by: 1949 – 1950: Hussein ibn Nasser
- Succeeded by: 1971 and 1972: Hazem Nuseibeh

Jordanian Ambassador to the United Kingdom
- In office 1956 – March 11, 1958
- Preceded by: Yousef Haikal
- Succeeded by: Abdelmunim al-Rifai

Jordanian Permanent Representative to the United Nations in New York City
- In office March 11, 1958 – October 6, 1965
- Preceded by: Abdelmunim al-Rifai
- Succeeded by: Abdelhamid Sharaf

Personal details
- Born: 9 September 1910 Al-Salt, Ottoman Empire
- Died: 1972 (aged 61–62)
- Spouse: Hanan Hashem (m. 1946)
- Children: 3, including Queen Alia of Jordan
- Education: American University of Beirut (B.A.)

Baha ud-din Toukan (Arabic: بهاء الدين طوقان; 9 September 1910 – 1972) was a Jordanian diplomat.

== Career ==
Toukan joined the Arab Legion and became secretary to the Commanding Officer in 1932. Five years later, he was transferred to Court of Abdullah, the Emir of Emirate of Transjordan. In 1941, he was employed in Jordan as clerk in the Arab Legion and official in the Department of Education unit seconded to the BBC as an Arabic announcer. BBC hired him for their London office the following year.

In 1944, he returned to Jordan. From April 1945 to August 1945, he was an Income tax Assesor of the Emirate of Transjordan. During the two-month negotiations in England in early 1946 for the Treaty of London, he was acting secretary to the Prime Minister Samir al-Rifai. He was then Mutasarrıf of the Balqa Governorate until 1947, when he became the Transjordan Consul-General in Jerusalem.

In 1948, he began a period as a Jordanian Ambassador, first in Beirut, Lebanon. He was then in Cairo, Egypt from 1948 to 1951, when he was assigned to Ankara Turkey until 1954. The following two years, he was Minister of State of foreign affairs (Under-Secretary, Ministry of Foreign Affairs). From 1956 to March 11, 1958, he was ambassador in London.

Beginning March 11, 1958, he was assigned as Permanent Representative to the United Nations in New York. He made a statement during a General Assembly session that disputed the position of the Jordanian government, and it was reported that the government dismissed him shortly after that, on 1 September 1958. This episode came about during a tense period following an attempt to overthrow King Hussein in April and Toukan's protest against Abdel Monem Rifia, having been sent to lead the General Assembly discussions for Jordan at the U.N. Rather than being asked to continue to lead the delegation, Toukan was asked to return to Jordan. He held that position, though, until October 6, 1965.

From 1962 to March 18, 1966 he was Minister of State of foreign affairs (Under-Secretary, Ministry of Foreign Affairs). From March 18, 1966 to 1971 he was head the mission of the Arab League en Rome. (Note: League's Rome Head Sayed Baha-al-Din Toukan, former Jordanian foreign under-secretary, arrived in Rome on 18 March to take over, as head of the Arab League's office there.)

== Notable published works ==
- A short history of Trans-Jordan. With foreword by H.R.H. Emir Abdullah (London: Luzac & Company, 1945. - 48 p.).

== See also ==
- Tuqan family
