= Ayyub Musallam =

Palestinian politician

Mayor of Bethlehem
- In office 1957–1962
- Preceded by: Elias Bandak
- Succeeded by: Elias Bandak

Personal details
- Born: Ayyub Musallam Ya'qub Musallam; 1905 Bethlehem, Ottoman Empire
- Died: 2001 (aged 95–96) Bethlehem, Palestine
- Profession: Politician, public speaker and writer

Ayyub Musallam Ya'qub Musallam (1905–2001) was a Palestinian politician, public speaker and writer. He was born in Bethlehem to a Catholic family. He served as Mayor of Bethlehem from 1957–1962, Parliament member, Cabinet member and President of the Arab Rehabilitation Society, Bethlehem / Beit Jala.

Political offices
Preceded by Elias Bandak	Mayor of Bethlehem; 1957–1962	Succeeded by Elias Bandak
