= List of ambassadors of Jordan to France =

Coordinates: 48.879667°N 2.266028°E

Ambassador of Jordan to France
- Incumbent; Leena AL-HADID since February 29, 2024
- Inaugural holder: Omar Zaki el-Afyouni
- Formation: January 26, 1949

The Jordanian Ambassador in Paris is the representative of the government in Amman (Jordan) to the government of France and is concurrently accredited to UNESCO, the Holy See and the government in Lisbon.

== List of representatives ==
Diplomatic accreditation	Ambassador	Observations	List of kings of Jordan	List of presidents of France	Term end
January 26, 1949	Omar Zaki el-Afyouni	(Note: Remise de lettres de créance, JORF n°26 du 30 janvier 1949, p.1074.)	Abdullah I of Jordan	Vincent Auriol	
March 30, 1950	Hussein Nacer	(Note: Remise de lettres de créance, JORF n°83 du 6 avril 1950, p.3707.)	Abdullah I of Jordan	Vincent Auriol	
March 13, 1951	Fawzi Al-Mulki	(Note: Remise de lettres de créance, JORF n°65 du 16 mars 1951, p.2754.)	Abdullah I of Jordan	Vincent Auriol	
November 27, 1951	Abdul Mejid Haidar	(Note: Remise de lettres de créance, JORF n°283 du 30 novembre 1951, p.11827.)	Talal of Jordan	Vincent Auriol	
December 18, 1952	Abdul Mejid Haidar	(Note: Remise de lettres de créance, JORF n°306 du 24 décembre 1952, p.11892.)	Hussein of Jordan	Vincent Auriol	
October 14, 1954	Ishan Hashim	(Note: Remise de lettres de créance, JORF n°245 du 20 octobre 1954, p.9855.)	Hussein of Jordan	René Coty	
May 15, 1956	Youssif Haykal	(Note: Remise de lettres de créance, JORF n°119 du 24 mai 1956, p.4767.)	Hussein of Jordan	René Coty	
November 22, 1962	Youssef Haikal	(Note: Remise de lettres de créance, JORF n°281 du 29 novembre 1962, p.11595.)	Hussein of Jordan	Charles de Gaulle	
October 24, 1964	Abdallah Salah	(Note: Remise de lettres de créance, JORF n°251 du 27 octobre 1964, p.9547.)	Hussein of Jordan	Charles de Gaulle	
April 26, 1971	Ali Abou Nouar	(Note: Remise de lettres de créance, JORF n°99 du 28 avril 1971, p.4099.)	Hussein of Jordan	Georges Pompidou	
February 20, 1975	Khalid El-Salem	(Note: Remise de lettres de créance, JORF n°45 du 22 février 1975, p.2139.)	Hussein of Jordan	Valéry Giscard d’Estaing	
November 16, 1978	Taher al-Masri	(Note: Remise de lettres de créance, JORF n°269 du 18 novembre 1978, p.3879.)	Hussein of Jordan	Valéry Giscard d’Estaing	
September 21, 1988	Awad Al-Khalidi	(Note: Remise de lettres de créance, JORF n°223 du 23 septembre 1988, p.12119, Système NOR MAEP8850021E.)	Hussein of Jordan	François Mitterrand	
February 1, 1993	Mutasim Bilbeisi	(Note: Remise de lettres de créance, JORF n°28 du 3 février 1993, p.1800, Système NOR MAEP9350002E.)	Hussein of Jordan	François Mitterrand	
November 8, 1995	Sherif Fawaz Sharaf	(Note: Remise de lettres de créance, JORF n°262 du 10 novembre 1995, p.16521, Système NOR MAEP9550029G.)	Hussein of Jordan	Jacques Chirac	
December 11, 1997	Adnan Bahjat Al-Talhouni	(Note: Remise de lettres de créance, JORF n°289 du 13 décembre 1997, p.18004, Système NOR MAEP9750092G.)	Hussein of Jordan	Jacques Chirac	
November 15, 2001	Dina Kawar	(Note: Remise de lettres de créance, JORF n°267 du 17 novembre 2001, p.18314, Système NOR MAEP0150065G.)	Abdullah II of Jordan	Jacques Chirac	
November 15, 2013	Makram Mustafa Queisi	(Note: Remise de lettres de créance, JORF n°270 du 21 novembre 2013, p.18856, texte n°1, Système NOR MAEP1350155G.)	Abdullah II of Jordan	François Hollande	

.
