= Permanent Representative of Jordan to the United Nations =

Coordinates: 40.752704°N 73.966369°W

Permanent Representative of Jordan to Headquarters of the United Nations
- Incumbent; Mahmoud Daifallah Hmoud since September 2, 2021
- Inaugural holder: Abdelmunim al-Rifai
- Formation: May 11, 1956

The Permanent Representative of Jordan to the United Nations is the representative of the government in Amman, Jordan, to the Headquarters of the United Nations in New York City.

== List of representatives ==
Diplomatic accreditation	Permanent representative	Observations	Ruling King of Jordan	Secretary-General of the United Nations	Term end
May 11, 1956	Abdelmunim al-Rifai		Hussein of Jordan	Dag Hammarskjöld	
August 21, 1957	Yousef Haikal		Hussein of Jordan	Dag Hammarskjöld	
March 11, 1958	Baha Toukan		Hussein of Jordan	Dag Hammarskjöld	
October 6, 1965	Muhammad Hussain El-Farra		Hussein of Jordan	U Thant	
April 5, 1971	Baha Toukan	His daughter married King Hussein in December 1972, a year after his death.	Hussein of Jordan	U Thant	
March 14, 1972	Abdelhamid Sharaf		Hussein of Jordan	Kurt Waldheim	
September 15, 1976	Hazem Nuseibeh		Hussein of Jordan	Kurt Waldheim	
February 11, 1983	Abdullah Amin Salah		Hussein of Jordan	Javier Pérez de Cuéllar	
May 4, 1992	Adnan Abu-Odeh		Hussein of Jordan	Boutros Boutros-Ghali	
September 22, 1995	Hasan Abu Nimah		Hussein of Jordan	Boutros Boutros-Ghali	
January 1, 2000	Prince Zeid bin Ra'ad		Abdullah II of Jordan	Kofi Annan	July 2007
July 1, 2007	Mohammed Al-Allaf		Abdullah II of Jordan	Ban Ki-moon	
September 1, 2010	Prince Zeid bin Ra'ad		Abdullah II of Jordan	Ban Ki-moon	
August 1, 2014	Dina Kawar		Abdullah II of Jordan	Ban Ki-moon	First female representative
September 2016	Sima Sami Bahous		Abdullah II of Jordan	Ban Ki-moon	
September 2021	Mahmoud Daifallah Hmoud		Abdullah II of Jordan	António Guterres	
