= Hassan Ibrahim (diplomat) =

Jordanian diplomat

Hassan Anees Qassem Ibrahim

Jordanian Ambassador to the Soviet Union of Jordan to Soviet Union
- In office 1969–1973
- Preceded by: Abdallah Salamé Zureikat
- Succeeded by: Kemal Mehmood Homoud

Jordanian he was Minister of the Occupied Territories Affairs
- In office 1980–1980

Personal details
- Born: 1928 (age 97–98)
- Spouse: . Married to Nuha Nahas on October 18, 1953
- Children: Rula, Reem, Rand and Luma
- Parents: Ansi Ibrahim (father); Latifah Ahmad (mother)
- Education: 1942-1946 Najah National College, Nablus.; 1946-1952 American University of Beirut.; 1957-1958 B.A. Political Science and Law of the New York University.; M.A. (History and Public Administration); 1958 Diploma General Administration, from UN.

Hassan Ibrahim (born 1928) is a retired Jordanian Ambassador.

== Career ==
- From 1952 to 1953 he was Teacher in Kuwait Schools.
- From 1953 to 1954 he was Clerk Ministry of Economy.
- From 1954 to 1955 he was Chief Clerk in the Ministry of Finance.
- From 1956 to 1959 he was employed from Civil Service commission.
- From 1959 to 1961 he was First Secretary in the Ministry of Foreign Affairs.
- From 1961 to 1963 he was Adviser in the Ministry of Foreign Affairs.
- From 1965 to 1968 he was Minister Plenipotentiary in Cairo (Egypt).
- From 1968 to 1969 he was ambassador to the Council of Arab Economic Unity.
- From 1969 to 1973 he was ambassador in Moscow (Soviet Union).
- In 1973 he was Ambassador, Head of Political Department in Ministry of Foreign Affairs.
- From 1973 to 1976 he was Secretary General of Ministry of Foreign Affairs.
- In 1976 he was Minister of State for Foreign Affairs and Minister of Reconstruction and Development.
- In 1979 he was Minister of State.
- In 1980 he was Minister of the Occupied Territories Affairs.
