= Nijmeddin Dajani =

Jordanian economist and ambassador (born 1928)

Jordanian Ambassador to Germany of Jordan to Germany
- In office 1972–1976
- Preceded by: Farhan Shubeilat
- Succeeded by: Ibrahim Youssouf Ibrahim Izziddin

Jordanian Minister of Trade and Industry
- In office 1976–1976
- Succeeded by: in 1991 and in 1995: Ali Abu Al-Ragheb; 1993;Abdullah Ensour; 1993-1995: Rima Khalaf; 2011: Hani Al-Mulki; 2016: Jawad Anani; Yarub Qudah

Personal details
- Born: 7 August 1928 Jerusalem
- Spouse: married 1965 Nawal Toukan
- Children: son Izzat (*6 November 1967), daughters Rula (*16 November 1966), Farah (*30 January 1972)
- Parent: Izzat (father)
- Education: 1950: Bachelor of Arts University of Wales.; 1957: Doctor of Philosophy, University of Wisconsin.

Nijmeddin Dajani (born 7 August 1928) is a Jordanian former economist and diplomat.

== Career ==
- From 1950 to 1952 he was employed at the Department of Statistics, Ministry of Economy, Damascus.
- From 1952 to 1955 he was Economic Analyst, UNRWA, Amman.
- In 1957 he graduated as Research Assistant.
- From 1957 to 1958 he was UNRWA economic analyst.
- From 1958 to 1962 he was Director of Economic Planning and Research.
- From 1964 to 1968 he was Secretary General and Vice President of the Jordan Development Board.
- From 1968 to 1976 he was Ambassador in Bonn (West Germany), Denmark, Sweden, Norway, Luxembourg and the European Economic Community.
- In 1976 he was Minister of Trade and Industry.

== Publications ==
- Yarmouk, Jordan Valley Project: an Economic Appraisal.

== Decorations ==
- Jordan Independence Medal
