= Elias Bandak =

Palestinian politician

Mayor of Bethlehem
- In office 1962–1972
- Preceded by: Ayyub Musallam
- Succeeded by: Elias Freij
- In office 1953–1957
- Preceded by: Afif Salm Batarseh
- Succeeded by: Ayyub Musallam
- In office 1951–1952
- Preceded by: Issa Basil Bandak
- Succeeded by: Afif Salm Batarseh

Personal details
- Born: Elias Issa Bandak c. 1911 Bethlehem
- Died: 26 April 1972 (aged 61) Jerusalem

Elias Issa Bandak (Arabic: إلياس بندك; c. 1911 – 26 April 1972) was a Palestinian politician who was the mayor of Bethlehem from 1951–1952, 1953–1957, and 1962–1972, serving three separate terms. He succeeded his cousin Issa Basil Bandak. Bandak was a Palestinian Christian.

Bandak died of cancer on 26 April 1972 at aged 61.

== See also ==
- Palestinian Christians

Political offices
| Preceded by Issa Basil Bandak | Mayor of Bethlehem; 1951–1952 | Succeeded by Afif Salm Batarseh |
| Preceded by Afif Salm Batarseh | Mayor of Bethlehem; 1953–1957 | Succeeded by Ayyub Musallam |
| Preceded by Ayyub Musallam | Mayor of Bethlehem; 1962–1972 | Succeeded by Elias Freij |
