= List of ambassadors of Jordan to the United States =

Coordinates: 38°56′28.5″N 77°03′59″W

Ambassadrice of Jordan to United States
- Incumbent; Dina Kawar since June 2016
- Inaugural holder: Abdelmunim al-Rifai
- Formation: December 14, 1953

The Jordanian Ambassador in Washington, D.C. is the representative of the government in Amman (Jordan) to the government of the United States.

== List of representatives ==
Below is a sortable list of individuals appointed as Ambassador Extraordinary and Plenipotentiary from the Hashemite Kingdom of Jordan to the United States of America.

Diplomatic agrément	Diplomatic accreditation	Ambassador	Observations
May 23, 1949	June 1, 1949	Yousef Haikal	
December 14, 1953			Legation was elevated to Embassy status
December 7, 1953	December 14, 1953	Abdelmunim al-Rifai	
June 22, 1957	August 2, 1957	Yousef Haikal	Dr.
October 27, 1958	November 18, 1958	Madhat Ibraheem Jumaa	
October 6, 1959	October 20, 1959	Yousef Haikal	Dr.
October 26, 1962	December 5, 1962	Saad Jumaa	
October 28, 1965	November 16, 1965	Farhan Shubeilat	
August 28, 1967	August 30, 1967	Abdelhamid Sharaf	
March 21, 1972	March 27, 1972	Zuhayr Mahmud Al-Mufti	
June 6, 1973	June 14, 1973	Abdullah Salah	
May 5, 1980	June 6, 1980	Sherif Fawaz Sharaf	
October 20, 1981	October 26, 1981	Abdul Hadi Majali	General, a younger brother of Abdelsalam al-Majali
May 30, 1983		Sultan Lufti	Charge d'Affaires
June 29, 1983	May 22, 1985	Ibrahim Youssouf Ibrahim Izziddin	
May 17, 1985	May 22, 1985	Mohammed Kamal	
August 29, 1988	September 19, 1988	Hussein Hammami	
February 4, 1993	April 14, 1993	Fayez Tarawneh	
September 8, 1997		Marwan al-Muasher	
July 1, 2002	January 15, 2007	Karim Kawar	
January 22, 2007	February 27, 2007	Prince Zeid bin Ra'ad	H.R.H.
September 14, 2010	September 16, 2010	Alia Hatough Bouran	
June 2016		Dina Kawar	

The Ambassador can be contacted through the Embassy of the Hashemite Kingdom of Jordan located at 3504 International Drive, N.W., North Cleveland Park, Washington, D.C. 20008.

== See also ==
- Jordan–United States relations
- Embassy of Jordan, Washington, D.C.
- United States Ambassador to Jordan
