= Hussein ibn Nasser =

Jordanian politician and diplomat (1902–1982)

Hussein ibn Nasser Sharif SMN GCVO
- حسين بن ناصر
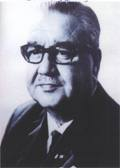

16th Prime Minister of Jordan
- In office April 21, 1963 – July 6, 1964
- Monarch: Hussein
- Preceded by: Samir al-Rifai
- Succeeded by: Bahjat Talhouni
- In office March 4, 1967 – April 23, 1967
- Monarch: Hussein
- Preceded by: Wasfi al-Tal
- Succeeded by: Saad Jumaa

Ambassador of Jordan to Turkey
- In office 1949–1950
- Succeeded by: 1971 and 1972: Hazem Nuseibeh; 2002: Marouf al-Bakhit; 2012: Amjad Adaileh

Ambassador of Jordan to Spain
- In office 1953–1960
- Preceded by: Issa Basil Bandak
- Succeeded by: Iklil Sati

Personal details
- Born: November 30, 1902 Ta'if, Ottoman Hejaz
- Died: May 1, 1982 (aged 79)
- Spouse(s): in 1943 married Princess Makbula, third daughter of Abdullah I of Jordan
- Children: Ferihan Debbas
- Parent: Sharif Nasser bin Ali Pasha 1863 brother of Hussein bin Ali, Sharif of Mecca (father)
- Relatives: Talal of Jordan and Ghazi of Iraq - nephews, Zein al-Sharaf bint Jamil - niece, Hussein of Jordan - grand nephew
- Education: studies in Hejaz schools

Hussein ibn Nasser Sharif GCVO (November 30, 1902 – May 1, 1982) was a Jordanian prince and statesman who served as the 16th Prime Minister of Jordan from 1963 to 1964, and again in 1967 during the reign of his grandnephew Hussein. He previously served as ambassador to Spain and Turkey.

== Career ==
- From 1929 to 1935 he was attached to the Royal Cabinet in Baghdad.
- From 1935 to 1937 he was Attaché at the Iraqi Legation to Turkey.
- From 1938 to 1942 he was Assistant Head of Royal Protocol in Baghdad.
- From 1944 to 1946 he was Assistant Head of Royal Protocol in Baghdad.
- From 1946 to 1948 he was Iraqi Consul-General in Jerusalem and Chargé d'affaires in Amman, (Jordan)
- From 1949 to 1950 he was Jordanian Minister Plenipotentiary to Turkey.
- From 1950 to 1951 he was Minister at the Legations to France and Spain.
- From 1953 to 1961 he was ambassador in Madrid.
- In 1961 he became Chief of the Royal Cabinet.
- In April 1963 Hussein of Jordan used his constitutional prerogatives, dissolved the Parliament, ordered his uncle Sharif Hussein ibn Nasser to form a government and curb Freedom of assembly of supporters of Gamal Abdel Nasser with Police, army and Bedouin contingents.
- From April 21, 1963 to July 6, 1964 he was Prime Minister of Jordan.
- From March 4, 1967 to October 7, 1967 he occupied again the position of Prime Minister of Jordan.
- In 1969 he was appointed member of the Senate.

== Honour ==
=== Foreign honour ===
- Malaysia : Honorary Grand Commander of the Order of the Defender of the Realm (S.M.N.) (1965)
