= Sherif Fawaz Sharaf =

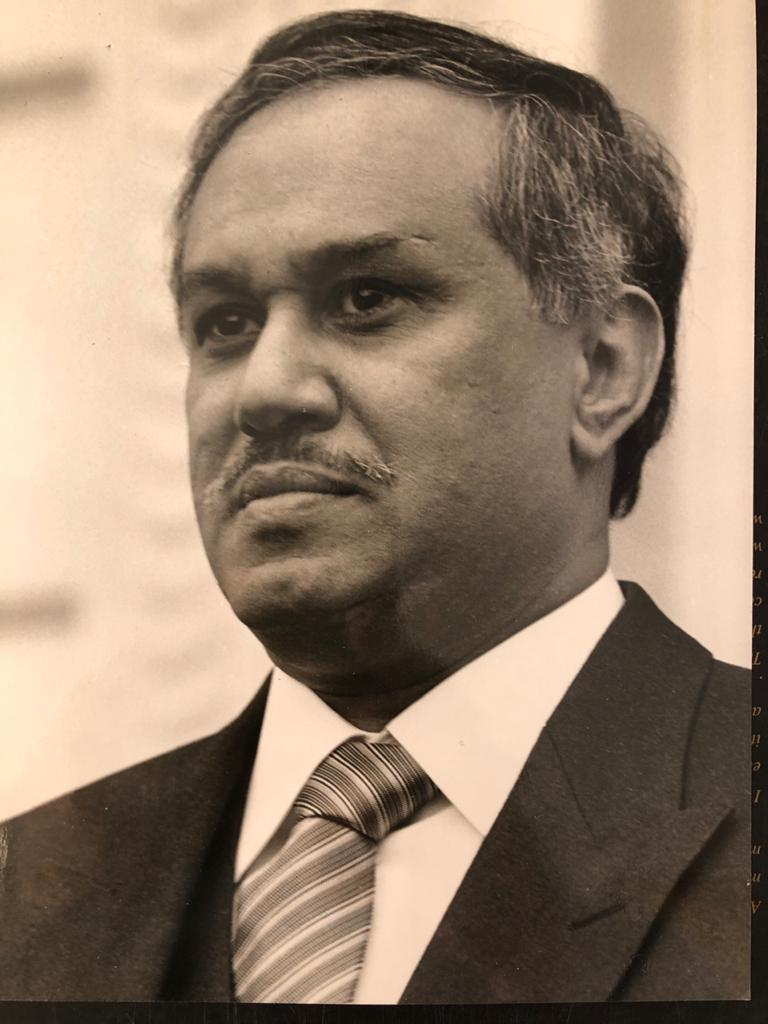

Jordanian Ambassador to France
- In office November 8, 1995 – December 11, 1997
- Preceded by: Mutasim Bilbeisi
- Succeeded by: Adnan Bahjat Al-Talhouni

Jordanian Ambassador to Germany
- In office November 26, 1981 – November 8, 1995
- Preceded by: Nahib Amr Al-Nimer
- Succeeded by: Hussein Ahmad Hammami

Jordanian Ambassador to the United States
- In office June 6, 1980 till – October 26, 1981.
- Preceded by: Abdullah Salah
- Succeeded by: Abdul Hadi Majali

Jordanian Minister of Culture
- In office November 1976 – June 6, 1980

Personal details
- Born: 1938 (age 87–88) Amman, Jordan
- Relatives: Abdul Hamid Sharaf (brother)
- Education: American University of Beirut

Sherif Fawaz Sharaf (born 1938) is a retired Jordanian minister and ambassador.
