= Abd al-Rauf al-Bitar =

Palestinian politician

- عبد الرؤوف البيطار

Mayor of Jaffa
- In office January 1939 – 17 June 1941
- Preceded by: Assam Bek As-Said
- Succeeded by: Omar al-Bitar

Personal details
- Born: Jaffa
- Died: 17 June 1941 Jerusalem, Mandatory Palestine

Abd al-Rauf al-Bitar (died 17 June 1941) was a Palestinian politician who served as the mayor of Jaffa from 1939 until his death in 1941.

== Biography ==
Bitar was born in Jaffa. He received his secondary education in the city, and later studied in Beirut. He then became a merchant, a military contractor and a tax collector. al-Bitar was married and had at the time of his death three sons and two daughters.

Bitar was first appointed Deputy Mayor of Jaffa by British Authorities in 1918, months after their occupation of the city from the Ottoman Empire. Bitar was elected to Jaffa's city council in 1927 and 1934.

In 1936, Bitar was elected head of the Jaffa Chamber of commerce. He also served as a member of the local Citrus control board.

On 5 January 1939, Mandatory authorities dissolved Jaffa's City Council, replacing it with a three-person committee headed by al-Bitar as Mayor.

Bitar survived an assassination attempt on 2 June 1939.

Bitar died in Jerusalem's Hadassah Medical Center on 17 June 1941 after a three-month illness. He was replaced as mayor by his brother, Omar al-Bitar.

A street in Tel Aviv-Yafo is named after Bitar.
