= Laith Shubeilat =

Jordanian politician (1942–2022)

Laith Shubeilat (Arabic: ليث شبيلات; 28 November 1942 – 18 December 2022) was a Jordanian Islamist politician. He was born in Amman, Jordan in 1942, a son of another Jordanian public figure, Farhan Shubeilat, from Tafila, a city within the southern district of Jordan.

Shubeilat was a graduate of civil engineering from the American University of Beirut in 1964, and gained his master's degree from George Washington University in 1968.

Shubeilat was elected for the first time as the head of Jordanian Engineers Association in 1982 as the first Islamist to win this seat. Later he was appointed for the National Advisory Council in Jordan where he started his political activities. In 1984 he was elected to parliament.

Thereafter, Shubeilat publicly opposed the Jordanian government and was imprisoned on several occasions.

Shubeilat died from a heart attack on 18 December 2022, at the age of 80.
