= Iklil Sati =

Jordanian Ambassador to Spain of Jordan to Spain
- In office 1967–1970
- Preceded by: Husayn al-Khalidi
- Succeeded by: Muhammad Hussain El-Farra

Personal details
- Born: 27 June 1926
- Spouse: Futun Sati
- Education: Studied law

Iklil Sati (born 27 June 1926) was a Jordanian ambassador.

== Career ==
From 1949 to 1950 he was private secretary of Abdullah I of Jordan, as well as Attaché in London, United Kingdom.

From 1952 to 1953, he was third secretary in Ankara, Turkey before returning to London and working as third secretary between 1953 and 1955.

From 1955 to 1956, he was second secretary in Damascus, Syria.

From 1956 to 1961 he was first secretary, counsellor and charge d'affaires in Madrid, Spain.

From 1963 to 1967 he was back in his homeland, where he was chief of protocol of the Royal Court, as well as the private secretary of Hussein of Jordan.

From 1967 to 1970 he returned to Madrid, where he served as ambassador.

From 1970 to 1972 he was once more back in Jordan, where he was secretary general of the Ministry of Foreign Affairs.

In 1972, he retired from royal service and became a businessman.
