= Assem Bey Said =

Mayor of Jaffa
- In office 1919–1939
- Preceded by: Office created Hassan Bey as Military Governor
- Succeeded by: Abd al-Rauf al-Bitar

Personal details
- Born: 1877 Jaffa
- Died: 1942 (aged 64–65) Jerusalem

Assam Bek As-Said (Arabic: عاصم بك السعيد) (31 - 1877 June 1942) was a Palestinian politician who served as mayor of Jaffa between 1919 and 1939.

== Biography ==
As-Said was born in Jaffa in 1877 to a notable Jaffan family. During the Ottoman Period, he served in several legal posts, first as a Notary Public, and later an assistant Chief Clerk in the District Court. He also served as a member of the Administrative Council of the Jaffa District for a 4-year period. In 1915, he was exiled by Ottoman authorities to Konya. He later returned and was appointed Mayor of Jaffa by British Authorities.

In 1938, As-Said fled to Cairo amid riots in Jaffa. In September, Hussein Shehad Eddin was appointed Acting Mayor in Said's stead. On 5 January 1939, Mandatory authorities dissolved Jaffa's City Council, replacing it with a three-person committee headed by Abd al-Rauf al-Bitar.

As-Said died on 31 June 1942 at the French Hospital in Jerusalem after a prolonged illness.
