= Omar Matar =

British chemical engineer

Omar Matar FREng, FIChemE
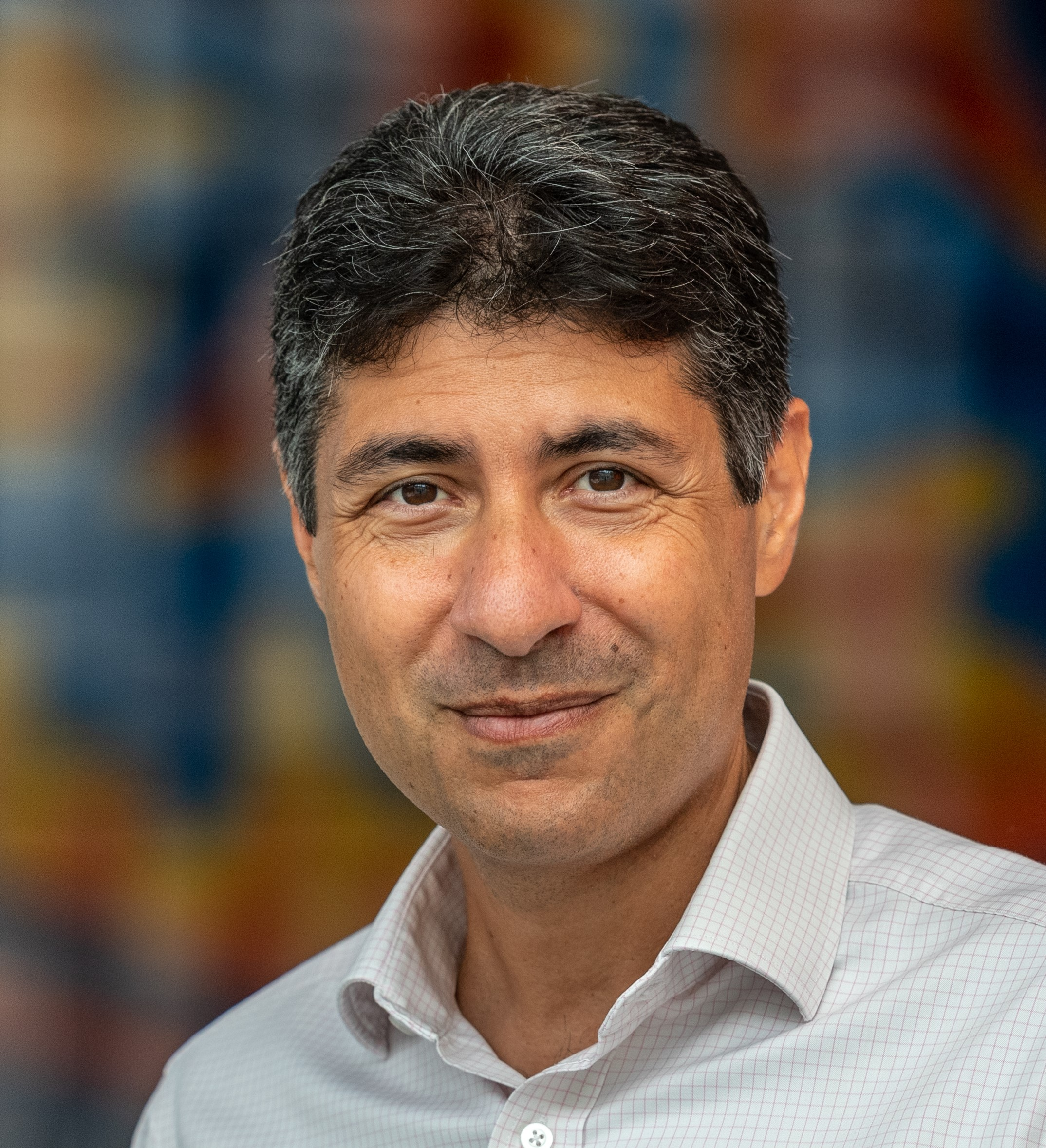
- Born: Omar K. Matar; Beirut, Lebanon
- Education: Imperial College London, Princeton University
- Known for: Fluid mechanics, Transient Multiphase Flows
- Awards: Fellow of the Royal Academy of Engineering (2020); Fellow of the Institution of Chemical Engineers (2019); Fellow of the American Physical Society (2015)
- Scientific career
- Fields: Chemical engineering, Fluid mechanics
- Workplaces: Imperial College London

Omar K. Matar is a Syrian-British chemical engineer specializing in fluid mechanics. He is a Professor of Fluid Mechanics in the Department of Chemical Engineering at Imperial College London.

== Education and career ==
Matar completed his undergraduate degree in chemical engineering at Imperial College London in 1993. He pursued his doctoral studies at Princeton University, earning his Ph.D. in 1998. That same year, he joined Imperial College London as a Lecturer in Chemical Engineering. He was promoted to Senior Lecturer in 2003 and became a full Professor in 2007.

He has had multiple leadership positions, including Head of the Department of Chemical Engineering since 2021, Vice-Dean (Education) for the Faculty of Engineering since 2017, and Director of Research from 2016 to 2021. Additionally, he has contributed to educational policy as Chair of the College e-Learning Strategic Committee since 2009 and Chair of the Engineering Studies Committee since 2011.

Since 2011, he has directed the Transient Multiphase Flows (TMF) consortium, a joint-industry research initiative focused on improving flow assurance strategies. In 2020, Matar co-founded Quaisr, an Imperial-Turing spin-off company, and is the CEO.

== Honors ==
- Fellow of the Royal Academy of Engineering (2020)
- Fellow of the Institution of Chemical Engineers (2019)
- Fellow of the American Physical Society (2015)
- Recipient of the 2014 Student Academic Choice Award for Best Teaching for Undergraduates
