= Yousef Haikal =

Jordanian politician, diplomat (1907–1989)

HE Dr. Yousef Haikal
- يوسف هيكل
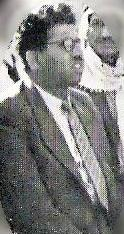

Mayor of Jaffa
- In office July 1945 – May 1948
- Preceded by: Omar al-Bitar
- Succeeded by: Office abolished Yitzhak Harpi as Military Governor

Jordanian Ambassador to the United States
- In office March 23, 1949 / June 1, 1949 – December 14, 1953
- Succeeded by: Abdelmunim al-Rifai

Jordanian Ambassador to the United Kingdom
- In office August 4, 1954 – May 18, 1956
- Preceded by: Sulayman al-Nabulsi
- Succeeded by: Baha Toukan

Jordanian Permanent Representative to the United Nations in New York City
- In office August 21, 1957 – June 5, 1962
- Preceded by: Abdelmunim al-Rifai
- Succeeded by: Abdelmunim al-Rifai

Jordanian Ambassador to India
- In office June 5, 1962 – May 10, 1964
- Succeeded by: October 3, 1964 – 1968 Kemal Mehmood Homoud

Jordanian Ambassador to China
- In office May 10, 1964 – March 10, 1969
- Preceded by: Azmi Nashachibi
- Succeeded by: Kamel Al-Sharif

Personal details
- Born: 1907 Jaffa, Ottoman Empire
- Died: 1989 (aged 81–82) Amman, Jordan
- Relatives: Hilmi Hanoun (nephew)
- Education: studied primary and secondary school in Jaffa
- Alma mater: Arab College (Jerusalem); University of London; University of Paris

Yousef Haikal (1907–1989) was a Palestinian-Jordanian Ambassador and the Mayor of Jaffa between 1945 and 1948.

== Biography ==
Haikal was born in 1907 in the city of Jaffa. After learning at the Arab College in Jerusalem, he sought degrees in Montpellier, Paris and the University of London, before returning to Mandatory Palestine in 1938. He served as the General Inspector of Awqaf (Muslim public properties in Palestine) for four years, and then as a District Judge in Nablus between 1943 and 1945. In 1945, Haikal was appointed a member of the Jaffa Municipal Commission by Mandatory Authorities. In July, he was appointed mayor, replacing Omar al-Bitar. 20 months later, Haikal was elected to a full term as Mayor.

In 1948, during the Israeli-Palestinian war, Haikal contacted David Ben-Gurion through a British intermediary trying to secure a peace agreement with nearby Tel Aviv. According to Ben-Gurion, the deal was blocked by the commander of the city's Arab militia, Abdul Wahab Ali Shihaini, in order to "secure the destruction" of Tel Aviv. By May, Haikal left the city for Amman in Jordan.

In 1949, Haikal was appointed Jordanian Minister to the United States, In 1952, he became Jordan's representative at the International Monetary Fund. He held both positions until 1953. He subsequently led the Jordanian Delegation with the Jordan–Israel Mixed Armistice Commission in Jerusalem between 1953 and 1954, and then served as Jordan's ambassador to the United Kingdom between 1954 and 1956, to France between 1956 and 1957, to the United States In 1957 and then again in 1959, to India between 1962 and 1964 and to the Republic of China between 1964 and 1969. Haikal also served as Jordan's Permanent Representative to the United Nations between 1957 and 1962.

After retiring from his diplomatic posts, Haikal moved to Lebanon and wrote a memoir. Hilmi Hanoun, who served as mayor of Tulkarm between 1963 and 1998, was a son of Haikal's sister, Asya. Haikal died in 1989 and was buried in Amman.
