= Sima Sami Bahous =

United Nations Diplomat

- سيما سامي بحوث
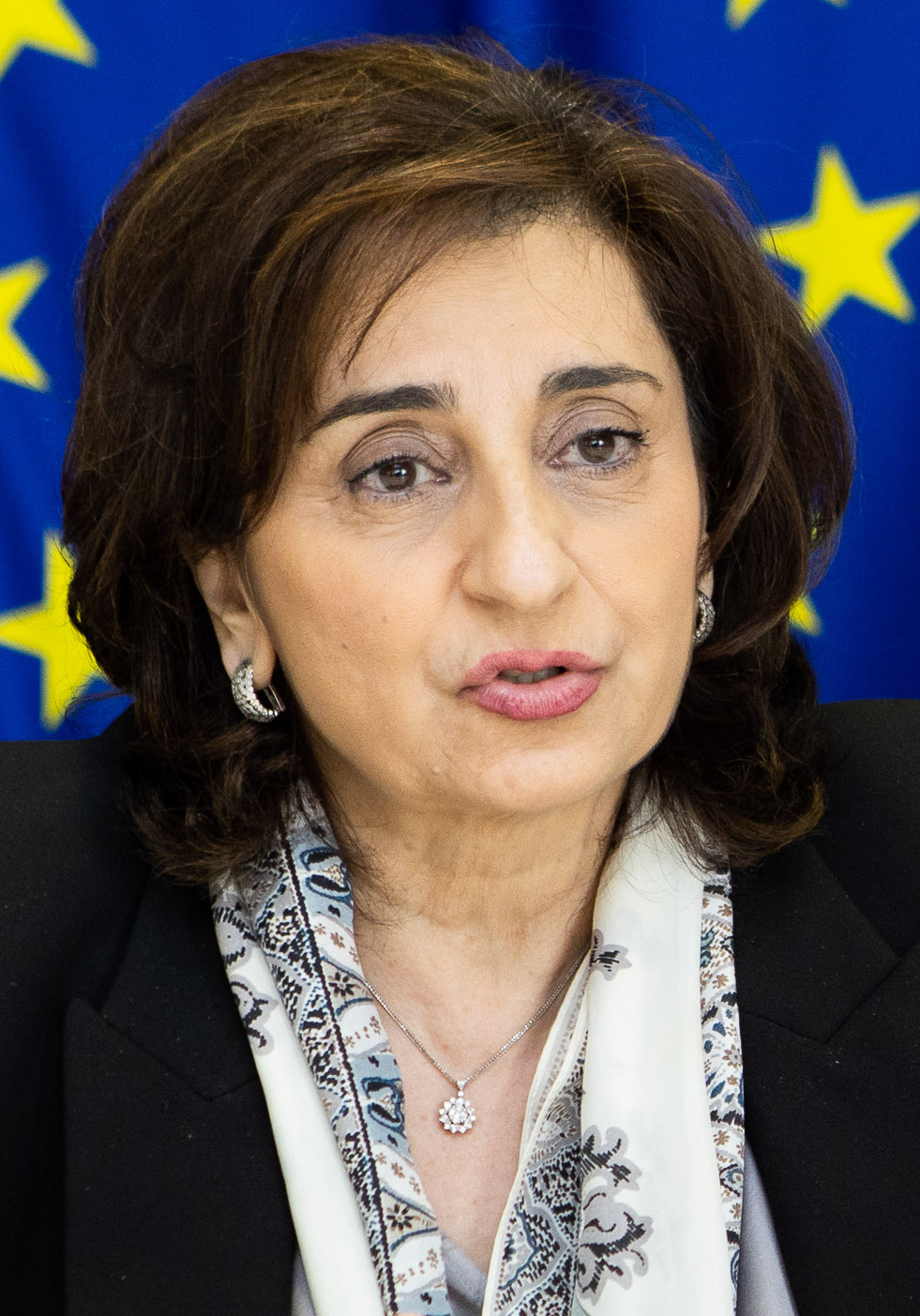
- Bahous in 2023

Executive Director of UN Women
- Incumbent
- Assumed office 2021

Permanent Representative of Jordan to the United Nations
- In office 2016–2021

UNDP Director for Arab States
- In office 2012–2016

Assistant Secretary-General of the Arab League
- In office 2008–2012

Personal details
- Born: June 26, 1956 (age 70)
- Citizenship: Jordanian

Sima Sami Bahous (Arabic: سيما سامي بحوث; born 26 June 1956) is a Jordanian diplomat and women's rights advocate, and has served as Executive Director of UN Women since 2021. She previously served as Jordan's Ambassador to the United Nations from 2016 to 2021. Earlier, she was Assistant Secretary-General of the Arab League in Cairo, Egypt.

== Early life and education ==
Bahous is Jordanian, and was born in June 1956. She has a bachelor's degree in English literature from the University of Jordan, a master's degree in literature and drama from the University of Essex, and a PhD in mass communications and development from Indiana University Bloomington. She is fluent in Arabic and English.

== Career ==
In Amman, Jordan, from 1994 to 1995 Bahous was head of communications at UNICEF. From 1996 to 1997 in Sanaa, Yemen, she was then a development advisor at the World Health Organization.

She returned to Jordan in 1997, and served from 1998 to 2001 as Executive Director of the Jordanian King Hussein and Noor Al Hussein Foundations. From 2001 to 2003 she was head of media and communication at the Jordanian Royal Hashemite Court, and from 2003 to 2005 an advisor to Jordanian King Abdullah. Bahous served as head of the Jordanian Higher Media Council from 2005 to 2008.

From 2008 to 2012, she was Assistant Secretary-General of the Arab League in Cairo, Egypt. In this role, she led a number of Arab League departments. From 2012 to 2016, Bahous served as Assistant Secretary-General for the United Nations Development Programme (UNDP) and Administrator and Director of the UNDP's Regional Bureau for Arab States. In this post, Bahous led UNDP's 18 Arab region programme offices.

In 2016, she was appointed the Permanent Representative of Jordan to the United Nations in New York.

In 2021, Jordanian King Abdullah II bestowed upon her the Order of The State Centennial in appreciation of her services to Jordan.

On 30 September 2021 she became UN Women's third Executive Director. She was described by the United Nations Secretary General as: "A champion for women and girls."

== Criticism ==
During Bahous's tenure as UN Women Executive Director, UN Women and Bahous were criticized for expressing concerns on the effects of war on Palestinian women, while remaining silent on Hamas' sexual and gender-based violence in the 7 October attack on Israeli civilian women and female minors. The organization under her leadership was criticized for the lengthy delay in its response, a response that followed the organization's alleged silence during the war.

As reported by The New York Times, at the United Nations, Gilad Erdan, Israel's Ambassador to the United Nations, said he sent two letters about the use of rape by Hamas militants, appended with photographs of victims' bodies, to Bahous. He said: "I got no response whatsoever. Not even, 'We received your letter.'" Israeli Foreign Minister Eli Cohen called on Bahous to resign. An analysis of her X posts and those of UN Women indicated that out of dozens of them, there were no condemnations of Hamas, and almost zero posts in the first week of the war.

Actress Natalie Portman posted on Instagram, and asked people to contact Bahous, providing her email address. She wrote, addressing Bahous:

"Women's organizations have neglected their role and abandoned the hostages in Gaza. They must take a stand now! The heinous sexual crimes committed against Israeli women on October 7th by Hamas are war crimes and crimes against humanity. Distance yourself from these crimes. You are committed to preserving women's rights without distinction of religion, race, or gender."

== Publications ==
- Bahous, Sima (31 March 2015). "New momentum in response to the Syria crisis: We must seize the moment". Ahram.
- Bahous, Sima (5 November 2015). "Saving lives, preserving dignity, and securing the future in Syria". UNDP.
- Bahous, Sima. "Water More Important Than Oil for the Future of the Arab World". The Huffington Post.
- Bahous, Sima (1 April 2014). "Creating Opportunities for Youth — The Way Forward for the Arab World". The Huffington Post.

== Personal life ==
Bahous is married to Ziad Rifai and has one daughter, Jahan.
