= List of ambassadors of Jordan to Spain =

Coordinates: 40.435352°N 3.691790°W

Ambassador of Jordan to Spain
- Incumbent; Areej Mahmoud Saleh Hawamdeh since January 31, 2018
- Inaugural holder: Issa Basil Bandak
- Formation: 1951

The Jordanian ambassador in Madrid is the representative of the government in Amman (Jordan) to the government of Spain.

== List of representatives ==
Diplomatic agrément/Diplomatic accreditation	Ambassador	Observations	List of kings of Jordan	List of prime ministers of Spain	Term end
1951	Issa Basil Bandak		Abdullah I of Jordan	Francisco Franco	1954
1953	Hussein ibn Nasser		Hussein of Jordan	Francisco Franco	1960
February 16, 1961	Iklil Sati	Chargé d'affaires	Hussein of Jordan	Francisco Franco	
October 26, 1962	Husayn al-Khalidi		Hussein of Jordan	Francisco Franco	1965
November 30, 1966			Hussein of Jordan	Francisco Franco	
September 4, 1967	Iklil Sati		Hussein of Jordan	Francisco Franco	1970
1970	Muhammad Hussain El-Farra		Hussein of Jordan	Francisco Franco	
1982	Taher al-Masri		Hussein of Jordan	Leopoldo Calvo-Sotelo	
1988	Suhail Khalaf El Tell		Hussein of Jordan	Felipe González	
1989	Muhammad Affash al-Adwan		Hussein of Jordan	Felipe González	
May 5, 1993	Shaher Husseen Bak		Hussein of Jordan	Felipe González	October 15, 1993
1994	Timoor Daghistani		Hussein of Jordan	Felipe González	1999
April 19, 2001	Abdullah Abdul Hamid Siraj		Abdullah II of Jordan	José María Aznar	2006
January 29, 2013	Ghassam Abdel Rahim Odeh Majali				
January 31, 2018	Areej Mahmoud Saleh Hawamdeh		Abdullah II of Jordan	Mariano Rajoy	

.
