= Issa Bandak =

Palestinian-Jordanian writer, politician and diplomat (1891–1984)

Issa Basil Bandak
- عيسى باسل البندك
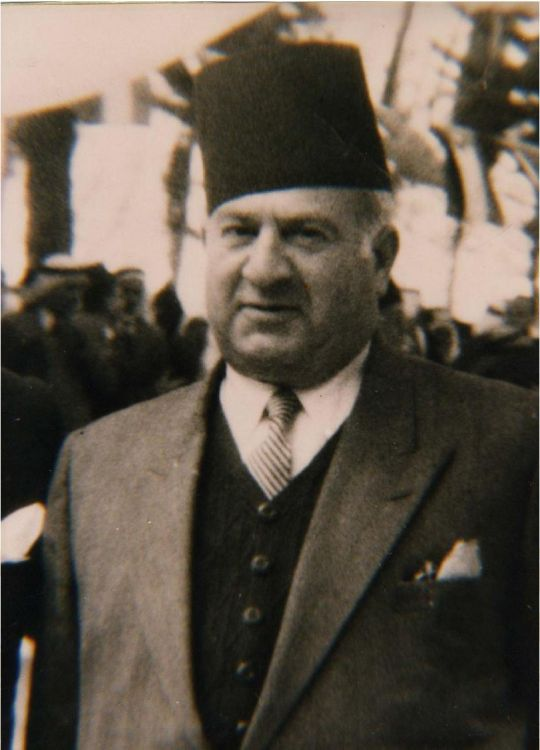

Mayor of Bethlehem
- In office 1946 – 18 October 1951
- Preceded by: Issa Hanna Kawas
- Succeeded by: Elias Bandak

Jordanian Ambassador to Spain of Jordan to Spain
- In office 1950–1953
- Succeeded by: Hussein ibn Nasser

Jordanian Ambassador to Chile of Jordan to Chile
- In office 1954–1956
- Succeeded by: Kemal Mehmood Homoud

Personal details
- Born: Issa Basil Bandak; 1891 Bethlehem, Ottoman Empire
- Died: 7 May 1984 (aged 92–93) Santiago, Chile
- Spouse: Zahiye

Issa Basil Bandak (Arabic: عيسى باسل البندك; 1891 – May 1984) was a Palestinian/Jordanian politician who served as Jordanian ambassador to Spain and commissioner to Chile after serving as Mayor of Bethlehem and appearing as part of the Jordanian delegation to the UN in 1950.

== Early life ==
Bandak was born in Bethlehem into a Christian family; he was educated in Bethlehem and Jerusalem. His plans to study medicine in Montpellier were stymied by the outbreak of World War I; instead, Bandak studied telegraph intelligence and became Director of the Telegraph Service in Syria, Jordan and Jerusalem during Ottoman rule until 1917.

Bandak taught in the Frères and Greek Orthodox Schools in Jerusalem. He produced the Bethlehem newspaper with Hanna Al-Issa in 1919 and the Sawt Ash-Sha'b magazine in 1922 (which continued to be published until 1957).

== Political career ==
Bandak became representative of the Bethlehem District for the Muslim-Christian Association, condemning plans for Zionist settlement in Palestine, and for the Arab Executive Committee (1921), establishing the Arab Youth Club in Bethlehem (1922). He became head of the 1st Youth Congress which convened in Jaffa in January 1932, which adopted a nationalist charter rejecting colonization and calling for a unified effort by all Arab countries to achieve Arab independence. Bandak was one of the co-founders of the Reform Party (initiated by Husayn al-Khalidi) in 1935; served as the thirteenth mayor of Bethlehem from 1933 to 1938. In 1943, he was nominated (together with Nicola Khouri and Yacoub Jmei'an) by the Arab Orthodox Committee to meet with Farouk of Egypt and Ibn Saud to explain the "Palestine Question" and was appointed again as mayor of Bethlehem from 1946 to 18 October 1951.

In 1950, Bandak was a member of the Jordanian delegation visiting the UN headquarters. He continued to serve Jordan overseas, serving as Ambassador of Jordan to Spain from 1951 to 1954 and as Jordanian commissioner in Chile from 1954 to 1957.

== Later life and death ==
Bandak was unable to return to Palestine after the 1967 war and died on 7 May 1984, in Chile. His last days were spent in the company of his wife Zahiye and his daughter Jihad.

Political offices
Preceded by Hanna Issa al-Qawwas	Mayor of Bethlehem; 1946–1951	Succeeded by Elias Bandak
