= Embassy of the United States, Amman =

Diplomatic mission of the United States to Jordan

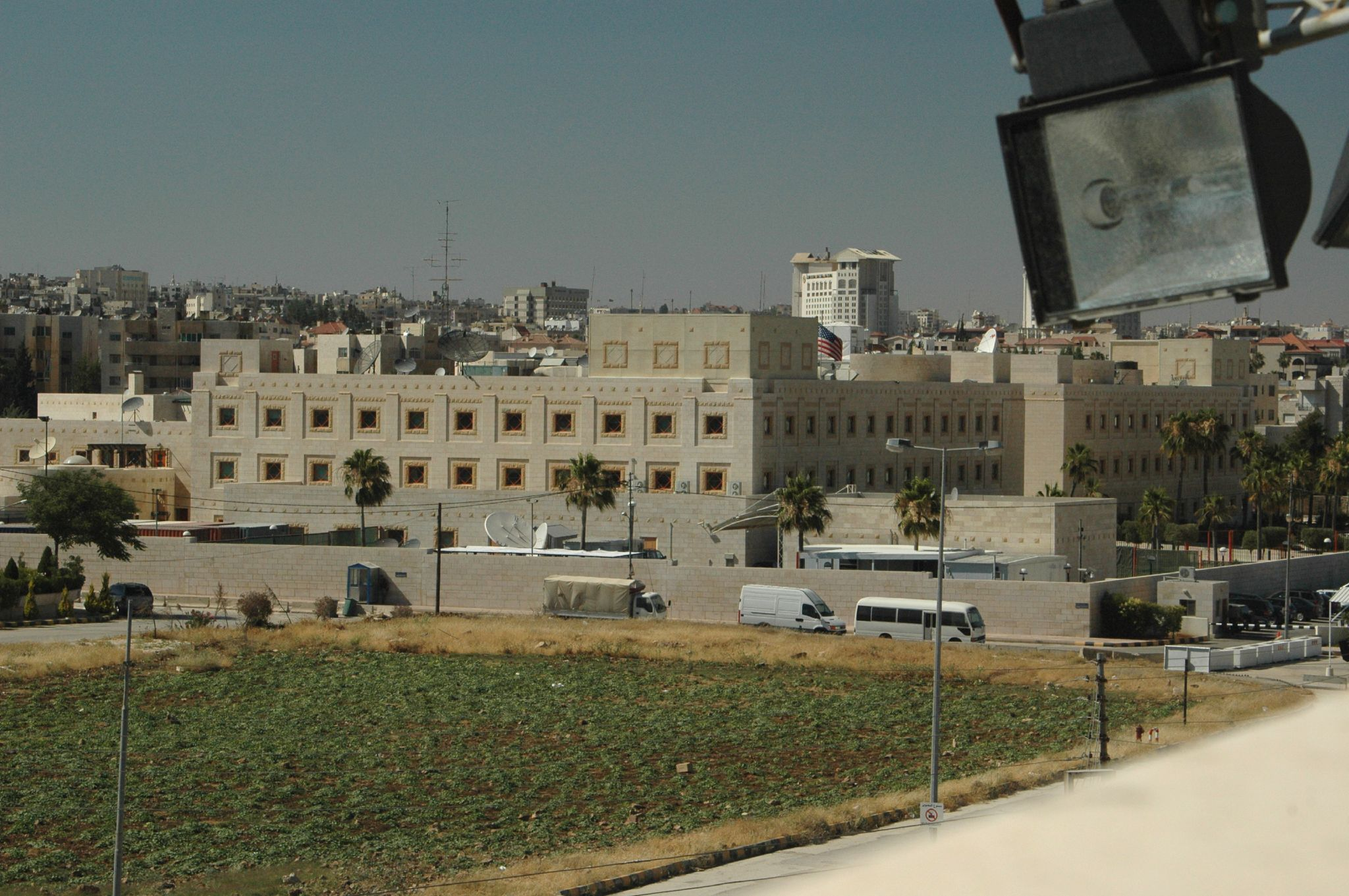
- The embassy in 2006
- Address: Al-Umawyeen Street, Amman
- Coordinates: 31.945437°N 35.880187°E
- Opened: July 4, 1992 (current building)
- Chargé d'affaires: Peter Shea
- Website: jo.usembassy.gov

The Embassy of the United States in Amman is the diplomatic mission of the United States to the Hashemite Kingdom of Jordan. It is located on Al-Umawyeen Street in Amman, the capital of Jordan.

The current Chargé d’Affaires of the Embassy is Peter Shea, serving since June 2025.

== History ==
=== Background ===
The United States and Jordan established bilateral relations on February 18, 1949. The first envoy was Wells Stabler, who served as Chargé d'Affaires ad interim until Gerald A. Drew was appointed as permanent Envoy Extraordinary and Minister Plenipotentiary on February 2, 1950. Following the raising of the Legation Amman, the original diplomatic office, to embassy status in 1952, subsequent envoys have held the title of Ambassador.

=== Chancery ===
In 1954, American architect Paul Rudolph was commissioned by the Department of State to design a new embassy in Amman. He worked on the design of the new embassy until 1956, but it was ultimately never built.

The current chancery began construction in 1988, at a cost of $50 million, and was opened on July 4, 1992, Independence Day in the United States. After the bombing of the U.S. Embassy in Beirut, Lebanon in 1983, retired Admiral Bobby Ray Inman requested the building be reinforced and heavily guarded. Due to this, it became known as Fort Apache among the diplomats there.

In 2020, the architecture magazine ENR gave an ENR award of merit to the architects, designers and engineers who worked on the new office annex (NOX), on the renovated chancery and on other upgrades to the embassy.
