= Saad Jumaa =

Jordanian politician, writer and poet

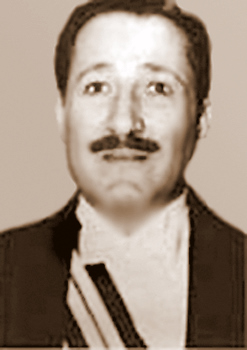
- Saad Jumaa as Prime Minister in 1967

17th Prime Minister of Jordan
- In office 23 April 1967 – 7 October 1967
- Monarch: Hussein
- Preceded by: Hussein ibn Nasser
- Succeeded by: Bahjat Talhouni

Personal details
- Born: Saad Mohammad Juma; 1916 Tafilah, Jordan
- Died: 19 August 1979 (aged 62–63) London, United Kingdom
- Party: Independent
- Education: Damascus University
- Profession: Writer, Thinker

Saad Mohammad Jumaa Alayoubi (Arabic: سعد محمد جمعة الأيوبي; 1916 – 19 August 1979) was a Jordanian politician, writer and poet who served as the 17th Prime Minister of Jordan in 1967.

== Biography ==
Saad Jumaa' was born in Tafilah, Ottoman Empire, in 1916 to the family of Alayoubi of Damascene origin.

Jumaa was a writer and intellectual. He completed his secondary education in Salt before pursuing a degree in law at Damascus University, from which he graduated in 1947.

Jumaa died on 19 August 1979 in London, United Kingdom.

== Career ==
Jumaa held the following positions and offices:

- Director General of Press and Publications (1948–1949)
- Head of the Political Division, Ministry of Foreign Affairs (1949–1950)
- Secretary to the Prime Minister (1950–1954)
- Vice-Minister of Interior (1954)
- Mayor of Amman (1954–1958)
- Vice-Minister of Foreign Affairs (1958–1959)
- Ambassador to Iran, then Syria (1959–1962)
- Ambassador to the United States of America (1962–1965)
- Chief of the Royal Hashemite Court (1965)
- Prime Minister and Defence Minister (1967)
- Member of the Senate (1967–1969)
- Ambassador at Ministry of Foreign Affairs (1969)
- Ambassador to the United Kingdom (1969–1970)

== Honours ==
- Malaysia: Honorary Commander of the Order of the Defender of the Realm (1965).
- Pahlavi dynasty:First class of the Order of Homayoun.
- China: Chinese First Class Medal.
- Italy: Order of Merit of the Italian Republic -1st Class / Knight Grand Cross.
- Jordan: Order of the Star of Jordan.

== Publications ==
- (Society of hatred), Arab Publisher House, Arabic, 1971.
- (God or destruction), Arabic.
- (The conspiracy and battle of fate), Arab Publisher House, Arabic, 1968.
- (The sons of snakes), Arabic.

== See also ==
- List of prime ministers of Jordan

Political offices
Preceded by Hussein ibn Nasser	Prime Minister of Jordan; 1967	Succeeded by Bahjat Talhouni
