= Muhammad Hussain El-Farra =

Jordanian Ambassador to Egypt of Jordan to Egypt
- In office 1963–1963
- Preceded by: 1951 to 1955: Awni Abd al-Hadi
- Succeeded by: 1967: Abdul Moneim Rifai; 1968 to 1971: Hazem Nuseibeh

Jordanian Ambassador to Spain of Jordan to Spain
- In office 1971–1972
- Preceded by: Iklil Sati
- Succeeded by: Taher al-Masri

Jordanian Permanent Representative to the United Nations in New York City of Jordan to United Nations
- In office November 1965 – March 1971
- Preceded by: Baha Ud-Din Toukan
- Succeeded by: Baha Ud-Din Toukan

Personal details
- Born: 20 April 1927 (age 99) Khan Yunis
- Parents: Hussain El-Farra (father); née Muftiya Yusuf (mother)
- Education: Suffolk University, Boston University and University of Pennsylvania.; 1950 Bachelor of Law.; 1951 Master's Degree of Law.; 1958 Doctor of Law Juridical Science Doctor

Muhammad Hussain El-Farra (born 20 April 1927) was a Jordanian diplomat.

== Career ==
- From 1955 to 1959 he was lecturer in the American University of Beirut.
- From 1952 to 1954 he was member of the Syrian delegation to the UN.
- From 1954 to 1955 he was vice-president of the Arab Students Organization to the US.
- From 1955 to 1959 he was Speaker of the League of Arab States.
- During 10 sessions he was member of the Jordan delegation to the UN General Assembly.
- In 1963 he was accredited minister plenipotentiary of Jordan in Cairo (Arab Republic of Egypt).
- From 1962 to 1964 he was deputy permanent representative of Jordan to the UN.
- From November 1965 to March 1971 he was permanent representative of Jordan to the UN.
- In March 1966 he was president of the United Nations Security Council.
- In 1971 he was ambassador in Madrid Spain.
- He was head or member of several delegations to the General Assembly to the UN, New York, and to the meeting in New York, Lebanon, Geneva and the League of Arab States in Cairo.
- He was Assistant Secretary General for Palestine Affairs at the League of Arab States.

== Publication ==
- Year of No Decision
