= Makram Mustafa Queisi =

His Excellency Makram Mustafa Queisi
- مكرم مصطفى القيسي
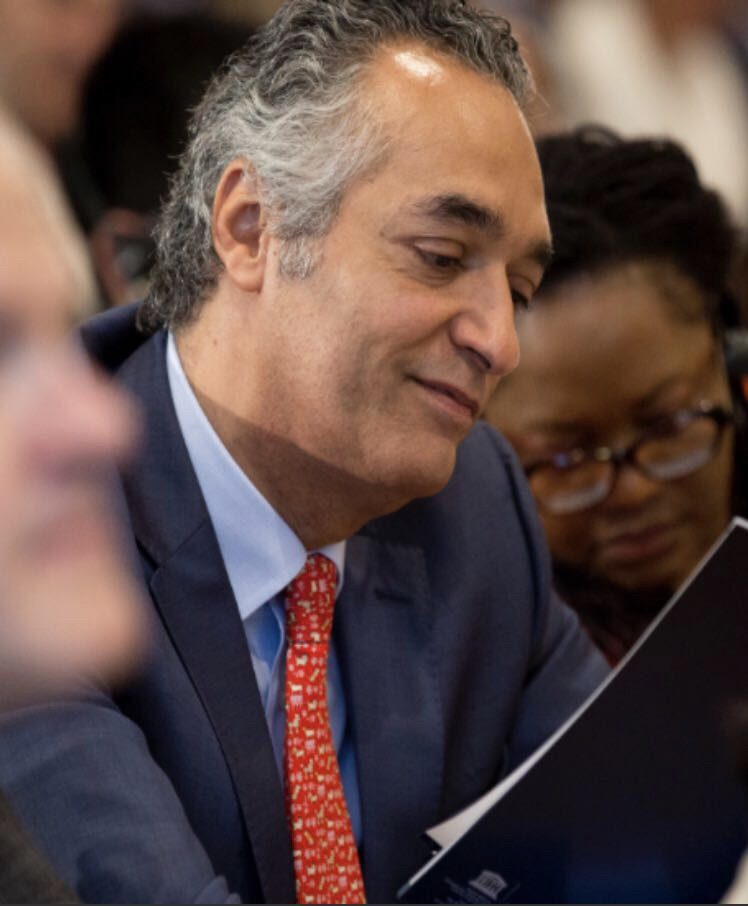
- Makram M. Queisi

Minister of Tourism and Antiquities
- Incumbent
- Assumed office 22 December 2022
- Prime Minister: Bisher Al-Khasawneh
- Preceded by: Nayef Al-Fayez

Jordanian Ambassador to France
- In office 2019–2022

Minister of Youth
- In office 2018–2018

Jordanian Ambassador to France
- In office 2013–2018

Jordanian Ambassador to Austria
- In office 2007–2012
- Preceded by: Shihab Madi
- Succeeded by: October 10, 2013: Hussam Abdullah Ghodayeh Al Husseini

Personal details
- Born: March 31, 1970 Amman, Jordan
- Spouse: Luna Abbadi
- Children: 3
- Parent: Mustafa al-Qaisi (father)
- Education: B.A. in Computer Science, University of Jordan, Amman (1992); Master of Arts in Diplomatic Studies, University of Westminster, UK (1999)

Makram Mustafa Queisi (born March 31, 1970 in Amman) is a Jordanian diplomat and politician, who is a former minister of youth of the Hashemite Kingdom of Jordan. He previously served as Jordan's ambassador to France, Portugal, the Holy See and the Permanent Delegation to UNESCO. Prior to his confirmation by King Abdullah II bin Al-Hussein as head of mission in Paris in 2013, he was serving as the Jordanian ambassador to the Republic of Austria from 2007 to 2012. He previously also served as the permanent representative of the Hashemite Kingdom of Jordan to the United Nations and other international organizations in Vienna, as well as non-resident ambassador to Hungary, Slovenia, the Czech Republic and the OSCE. Queisi was appointed as the ambassador of Jordan to France since October 2019, as well as the permanent delegate of Jordan to UNESCO, which is the post that he is holding.

Queisi is married to the Jordanian lawyer Luna Mamdouh Abbadi, with whom he has three children. He holds a B.A. in computer science from the University of Jordan as well as a Master of Arts degree in diplomatic studies from the University of Westminster/Diplomatic Academy of London in the United Kingdom.

== Career ==
Makram Mustafa Queisi started his career at the Royal Hashemite Court. He was first, the Coordination and Media Officer et the Office of the Chief of the Royal Hashemite Court (1993–1994), then Office Director at the Office of His Royal Highness the Prince Abdullah Bin Al Hussein.

Between 1996 and 2005 he occupied the position of Assistant Chief of Royal Protocol then the Chief of Protocol (2005–2007) at Royal Hashemite Court. At the same time, he was the coordinator at the World Economic Forum Annual Meeting (WEF), Dead Sea (2005); at the Ministry of Foreign Affairs.

While serving as the Jordanian ambassador and permanent representative of his country at the IAEA in Vienna, Ambassador Queisi became the governor from the Hashemite Kingdom of Jordan to the International Atomic Energy Agency IAEA between 2010 and 2012; he was then elected as the vice-chairman of the IAEA Board of Governors (2011–2012). And also became the dean of the Arab Diplomatic Crops (2012–2013).

In 2016, in parallel to his position as the Jordanian ambassador in France, Ambassador Queisi, acknowledging his experience in the International Nuclear Issues, was appointed as Jordanian's Sherpa to the Nuclear Security Summit. Then in 2017, Mr. Queisi was asked to chair the Nuclear Security Contact Group.

== Distinctions ==
- French National Order of Merit, Grand Officer, Awarded by President Macron, 2018
- Grand Decoration of Honour in Gold with Star for Services to the Republic of Austria, 2013
- First Order Medal of Independence granted by His Majesty King Abdullah II, 2007
- Second Order Medal of Independence by His Majesty King Abdullah II, 2004.
- Third Order Medal of Independence granted by His Majesty King Abdullah II, 2003.
- “Special Token” granted by His Majesty late King Hussein of Jordan for the efforts in the preparations of the Signing Ceremony of the Peace Treaty in Wadi Araba, between Jordan and Israel, 1994.
- British Medal by Queen Elizabeth II of Great Britain and Northern Ireland.
- Swedish Grand Officer Medal granted by His Majesty King Carl XVI Gustaf, 2003.
- Decoration from Austria, 2001
- Medals and Decorations from Spain, Norway, Italy, the Netherlands, and Ukraine.
