= Sa'ad Khair =

Jordanian military intelligence officer

Sa'ad Pasha Khair
- Died: December 9, 2009 (aged 57–58)
- Occupation: Head of the General Intelligence Directorate
- Title: Field Marshal, Pasha
- Relatives: Basheer Khair (Father} Saeed Pasha Khair (Grandfather) Akef Al-Fayez (Cousin) Trad Al-Fayez (Cousin)

Sa'ad Pasha Khair (c. 1951 – December 9, 2009) was the leading Jordanian Intelligence and Security official from 2000 until 2005 and one of only four who held the rank of Field Marshal in Jordanian history apart from the Kings of Jordan.

== Background ==
Sa'ad was born to an influential family in Amman in 1951. His grandfather Saeed Pasha was the Mayor of Amman between 1920 and 1925, and his paternal Aunt was married to and was the favorite wife of Mithqal Pasha Al-Fayez. His father Basheer was the Governor of Amman in 1951-1952.

Sa'ad died in Vienna in December 2009 from a heart attack.

== Career ==
Between 2000 and 2005, Sa'ad Khair was the head of the newly formed Jordanian National Security Agency, otherwise known as General Intelligence Directorate, and was a key U.S. ally in the war on terror. He participated in the CIA extraordinary rendition of people suspected by the US government of being terrorists.

Khair's work during this period is considered instrumental and extraordinary by the intelligence community generally and the CIA specifically. Head of the CIA at the time George Tenet described Khair as a "superstar" in global intelligence for his role. Another CIA operative who worked closely with Khair said that he (Khair) "set the standard for how we do it".

King Abdullah II mentioned in his book that Khair was the one who discovered and stopped an Iraqi plot to poison the water supply in Zarqa and nearby locations which would have killed thousands of innocent Jordanians.

== Suisse secrets ==
During the Suisse secrets investigation it became known that he had one Credit Suisse account of more than 28 million Swiss francs, even though he qualified as a politically exposed person. His brother and wife held accounts of 13 and 6 million francs, respectively.

== In popular culture ==
The character ‘Hani Salaam’ in the Sir Ridley Scott film Body of Lies is said to have been largely inspired by the six-year tenure of Sa’ad Khair as the GID chief. David Ignatius, author of the novel on which the film is based, has written about his encounter with Khair and modelling the character after him. Both the story and the film feature incidents directly inspired by Saad Khair’s experiences as the spy chief, as the author says, the part where Hani Salaam meets with a jihadist making him talk with his mother on phone and the fearsome spy headquarters’ being called the ‘fingernail factory’ are among a few. The first incident, in real life, took place in an 'Eastern European city where Khair with his team tracked down an undercover jihadist in an apartment and made him talk with his mother on phone in an attempt to force him emotionally in 'changing side' to the Jordanian government.

‘Hani Salaam’ was portrayed by British actor Mark Strong, whose performance in the film got particular critical acclaim because of its notable suavity and illusiveness, which according to the original author reflected the personality of Sa’ad Khair.

== See also ==
- Al-Fayez
- Mithqal Al-Fayez
- General Intelligence Directorate
- Suisse secrets
