= Royal Norwegian Order of Merit =

Norwegian knighthood order

Royal Norwegian Order of Merit Kongelige Norske Fortjenstorden
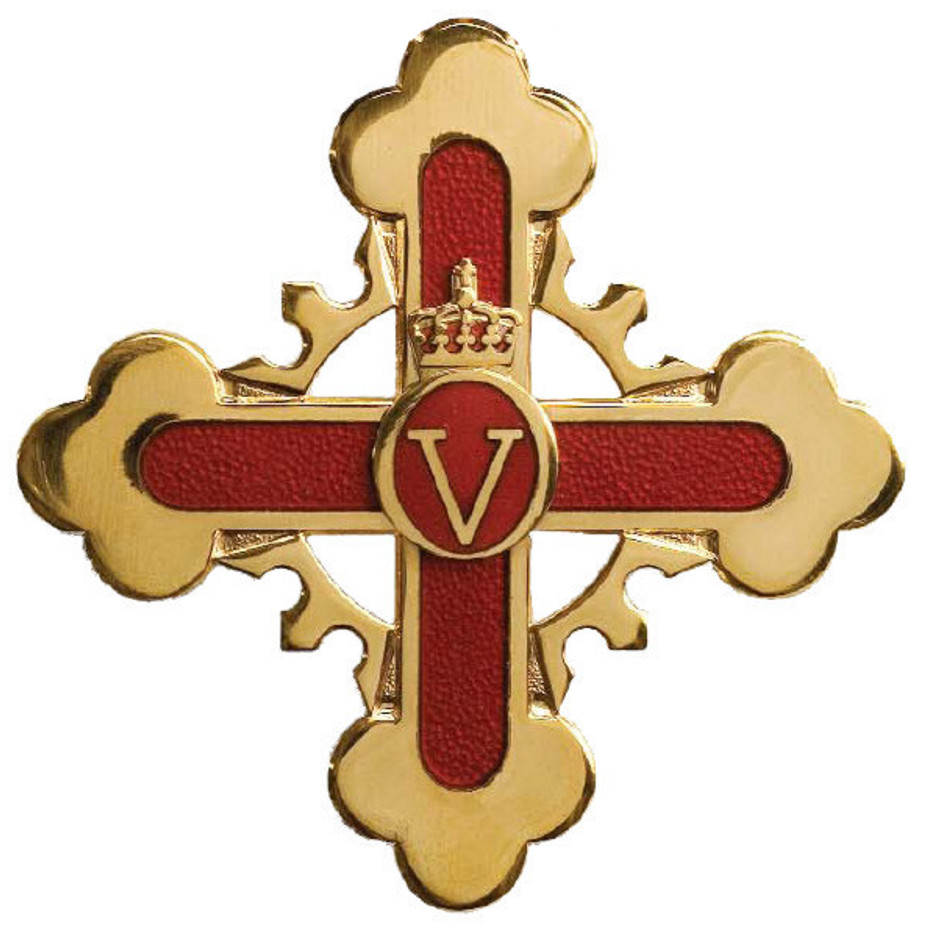
- Cross of the Order
- Type: Three class order with two sub-classes
- Country: Norway
- Grand Master: King Haakon VIII

Precedence
- Next (higher): Order of St. Olav
- Next (lower): King Haakon VII Freedom Cross
- Ribbon for Grand Cross Ribbon for Commander with Star Ribbon for Commander Ribbon for Knight 1st Class Ribbon for Knight

The Royal Norwegian Order of Merit (Bokmål: Den Kongelige Norske Fortjenstorden; Nynorsk: Den Kongelege Norske Fortenesteordenen) was instituted by King Olav V in 1985. It is awarded to foreigners, Norwegian citizens living abroad, Ministry of Foreign Affairs diplomats, foreign civil servants in Norway, and Norway's honorary consuls for "outstanding service in the interests of Norway". Its counterpart, the Royal Norwegian Order of St. Olav, is generally only awarded to Norwegian citizens living in Norway.

== Structure and insignia ==
The reigning monarch, King Haakon VIII, is the Grand Master of the Order. The order has five grades: Grand Cross, Commander (which is further subdivided into Commander with Star and Commander), and Knight (which is further subdivided into Knight 1st Class and Knight).

The Order is characterized by a ribbon of deep blue moiré. The Grand Cross is worn on a broad sash that hangs over the right shoulder. The Commander's Cross is worn around the neck on ribbon of the Order. The Knight's Cross is worn over the left breast on a ribbon. Women wear both the Commander's Cross and the Knight's Cross over the left breast on a ribbon of the Order that has been fashioned into a bow. Unlike the Order of St. Olav, the insignia of the Royal Norwegian Order of Merit are the property of the recipient.

== Conferment ==
Applications are submitted through the Protocol Department of the Royal Ministry of Foreign Affairs. The King receives the applications and confers the Order based on the council of the Lord Chamberlain of the Court, the Chief Protocol of the Royal Ministry of Foreign Affairs, and the Head of Chancery of the Royal Norwegian Order of St. Olav.

== Recipients ==
Grand Crosses

- HRH Princess Astrid of Belgium (2003)
- HRH Princess Claire of Belgium (2003
- HRH Prince Laurent of Belgium (2003)
- HRH Prince Lorenz of Belgium (2003)
- HRH Prince Ali bin Hussein (2000)
- HRH Princess Rym al-Ali (2020)
- HRH Princess Alia bint Hussein (2000)
- HRH Princess Zein bint Hussein (2000)
- HRH Prince Talal bin Muhammad (2000)
- HRH Princess Ghida Talal (2000)
- HRH Prince Ghazi bin Muhammad (2020)
- Faisal Al-Fayez (2020)
- Gabriele Albertini
- Juliana Awada
- Krister Bringéus
- Maria Cavaco Silva
- Armand De Decker
- Laurent Fabius
- Werner Fasslabend
- Jaime Gama
- Jenni Haukio
- Yousef Huneiti (2020)
- Toomas Hendrik Ilves
- Jean-Claude Juncker
- Kim Jung-sook
- Ben Knapen (2021)
- Vytautas Landsbergis
- Thomas A. Loftus
- Luiz Inácio Lula da Silva
- Marisa Letícia Lula da Silva
- Narendra Modi (2026)
- Sauli Niinistö
- John D. Ong
- Juan M. Ortiz de Rozas (2016)
- Christian Poncelet
- Omar Razzaz (2020)
- Eliza Reid
- Ayman Safadi (2020)
- Hide Sakaguchi (2024)
- Franz Schausberger
- Wolfgang Schüssel
- Yousef Shawarbeh (2020)
- Antonio Tajani (2023)
- Guy Verhofstadt
- Pieter van Vollenhoven

=== Commanders with Star ===
- Keith B. Alexander
- Vincas Babilius
- Edminas Bagdonas
- Grażyna Bernatowicz
- Micael Bydén
- Sverker Göranson
- Fred Kavli
- Retno Marsudi
- Franklin Miller
- Arnoldas Milukas
- Rasa Rastauskienė
- Riho Terras
- Volker Wieker

=== Commanders ===
- Amjad Adaileh
- Elżbieta Bieńkowska
- Bjørn Olav Blokhus
- Stéphane Braunschweig
- Marius Haas
- Kjell H. Halvorsen
- John Hamre
- Helga Hernes
- Haakon Baardsøn Hjelde
- Mariss Jansons
- Lars-Emil Johansen
- Krzysztof Krajewski
- Irena Lichnerowicz-Augustyn
- Erik Mose
- Klaus Naumann
- Fred H. Nomme
- Arild Retvedt Øyen
- Jan Paulsen
- Svein Sevje
- Ingebjørg Støfring
- Conrad Swan
- Yury Yevdokimov

=== Knights ===
- Brian Bell
- Jostein Helge Bernhardsen
- Martin Tore Bjørndal
- Sissel Birgitte Breie
- Lisa Campbell (1994)
- Tove Irene Dahl
- Finn Kristen Fostervoll
- Gary L. Gandrud
- Mišo Grundler
- Stephen E. Harding
- Thorir Hergeirsson
- Charles Letts
- Bernard Loew
- Odd S. Lovoll
- Sverre Lyngstad
- Tiina Nunnally (2013)
- Margaret Hayford O'Leary (2016)
- Knut Ødegård
- David Olson
- John Jason Pantages
- Ronald Stubbings (1999)
- Didrik Tønseth (diplomat)
- Sjur Torgersen
- Heiko Uecker
- Jarka Vrbová
- Jon Westborg

=== Unknown Classes ===
- Aqel Biltaji
- Dinna Bjørn
- Rut Brandt
- Ingvard Havnen
- Graham John Hills
- Wilhelmina Holladay
- Stanisław Koziej
- Carl Epting Mundy Jr.
- Kathie L. Olsen
- Oda Sletnes

== See also ==
- Orders, decorations, and medals of Norway
