= Didrik Tønseth =

Didrik Tønseth may refer to:

- Didrik Tønseth (diplomat) (born 1944), Norwegian diplomat and lawyer
- Didrik Tønseth (skier) (born 1991), Norwegian cross-country skier

== See also ==
- Diderik Iversen Tønseth, Norwegian politician
