= Tønseth =

Tønseth is a surname. Notable people with the surname include:

- Didrik Tønseth (diplomat) (born 1944), Norwegian diplomat and lawyer
- Didrik Tønseth (skier) (born 1991), Norwegian cross-country skier
- Erik Tønseth (born 1946), Norwegian jurist and industrialist
- Jan Jakob Tønseth (1947–2018), Norwegian author, poet and translator
- Per Tønseth (1914–1993), Norwegian judge
