= Saeed Pasha Khair =

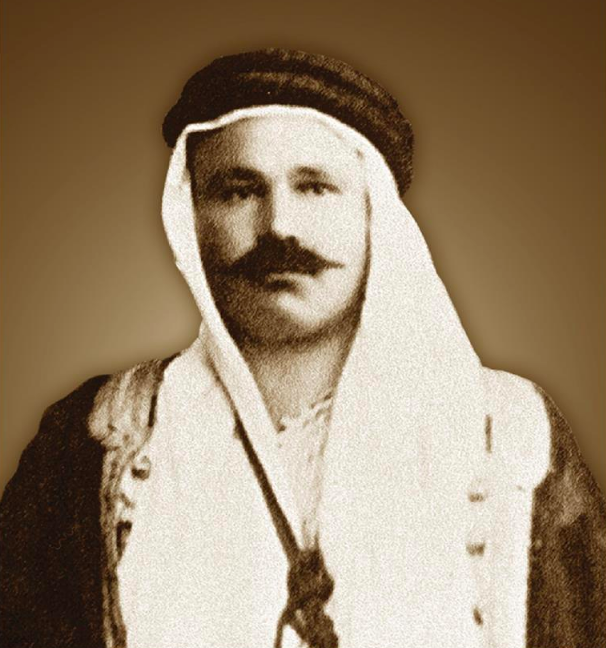
- Born: 1867; Al-Salt, Ottoman Empire
- Died: 28 January 1925 (aged 57–58)
- Resting place: Amman, Jordan
- Occupation: Mayor
- Years active: 1920-1925

ٍSaeed Pasha Khair (Arabic: سعيد باشا خير, Saeed Khayr; 1867 – 28 January 1925) was a Jordanian politician born in Al-Salt, Jordan. He was the fifth Mayor of Amman and the first during the Emirate of Transjordan. He played a key role in Amman becoming the Capital of Jordan.

== Origins and early life ==
Khair was born to a wealthy Damascene family known for trading in the Vilayet of Damascus. He became known as a businessman and would further establish routes in the then minor town of Amman through land purchases. In 1909, Ismael Babouk, alongside Saeed Khair and other Amman notables established the first municipal council in Amman.

== Mayor of Amman and Establishment of the Emirate ==
Khair became the fifth Mayor of Amman around the beginning of 1920, this, alongside his alliance with Mithqal Pasha of the Al-Fayez through the marriage of Khair's daughter Adul to the sheikh, made Khair a powerhouse in Amman and the greater Balqa region's politics. In November 11t, 1920, Khair, his son-in-law, and a group of Jordanian dignitaries met the then Sharif Abdullah Bin Husayn in the city of Ma'an and were the first party to do so. At first the Sharif was hesitant to move north but was persuaded by Khair and Al-Fayez. Khair suggested that Sharif Ali bin Hussein al-Harithi would first move north and gather support for Abdullah in Amman and its surrounding areas, to which Abdullah agreed. Khair personally drove the train carrying Al-Harithi and some of the Sharif's men to Amman. The first stop was at Al-Jizah, the stronghold of Al-Fayez, where Mithqal contributed a thousand rides to follow the party to Amman and establish the focal-point of the Hashemite movement in Jordan there. The Emirate was established soon in 1921, with its capital being Amman which Khair remained the mayor of. This didn't please the inhabitants of much more established towns of Ma'an and Al-Salt who argued that their cities were more appropriate for the Capital of the new Emirate. Khair died during his mayorship in the 28th of January, 1925.

== Legacy ==
Khair's legacy has lasting effects on Jordan. His son Hashem became mayor of Amman in 1939 till 1942. His first grandson, Akef Al-Fayez, is one of the most prominent political figures in Jordan's history. His grandson from his son Basheer, Sa'ad Khair, became a Field Marshal and head of the GID. Amman has major streets named after all of those figures including an Al-Khair street. His great-grandson Faisal Al-Fayez became Prime Minister of Jordan. King Abdullah I was famously quoted in reference to Khair saying "By God, if the religion allowed for the erection of a memorial statue for him, I would erect a statue for him in the largest square in Amman to immortalize his memory, and glorify his virtues, deeds, and noble services."

== See also ==
- Sa'ad Khair
- Mithqal Al Fayez
- Al-Fayez
