= Fostervoll =

Fostervoll is a surname. Notable people with the surname include:

- Alv Jakob Fostervoll (1932–2015), Norwegian politician
- Finn Kristen Fostervoll (born 1939), Norwegian diplomat
- Kaare Fostervoll (1891–1981), Norwegian educator and politician
