= Ahmad Malkawi =

Mayor of Amman, Jordan

Mayor of Amman
- Incumbent
- Assumed office 11 August 2026
- Preceded by: Yousef Shawarbeh

City Manager of Amman
- In office 2019–2026

Deputy City Manager for Public Works
- Incumbent
- Assumed office 2019
- Succeeded by: 2013

Ahmad Malkawi (born 1971) is a Jordanian politician, who serves as the 41st and current mayor of Amman, Jordan since 2026.

== Education ==
Malkawi earned a bachelor's degree in civil engineering from the University of Jordan in 1993.

== Career ==
Malkawi joined the Greater Amman Municipality in 1994 as a site engineer working on roadworks and maintenance. During his municipal career, he held various engineering and administrative positions involving road construction and maintenance, environmental services, solid waste management, parks, public works and transportation infrastructure.

In 2013, he was appointed Deputy City Manager for Public Works. In March 2019, he became City Manager of Amman, a position he held until his subsequent appointment as chairman of the Greater Amman Municipality committee.

His work has included involvement in the Amman Bus Rapid Transit (BRT) project, infrastructure development, street maintenance, environmental projects and the implementation of parks. His responsibilities have also included strategic planning, performance improvement, budgeting and the management of municipal resources.
