= Angola–Norway relations =

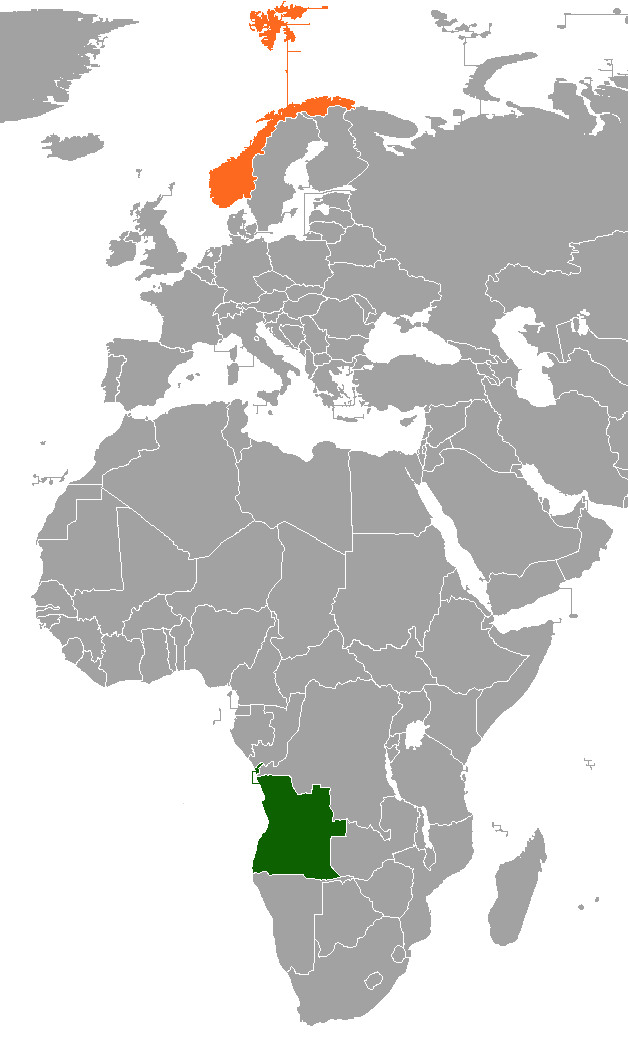
- Angola: Norway

Angola–Norway relations are the bilateral and diplomatic relations between Angola and Norway. Norway has an embassy in Luanda, whereas Angola has a non resident embassy in Stockholm.

Foremost, Angola has been described as "Norway's most important economic partner in Africa". Both petroleum-rich countries, the state-owned Norwegian petroleum company Statoil ventured into Angola in 1991. Angola became Statoil's largest petroleum operation outside of the Norwegian shelf.

Norway and Angola established diplomatic relations in 1977. The Norwegian embassy in Luanda opened in 1998.

Formerly, the embassy included an "embassy office" in Kinshasa, which was later upgraded to an embassy of its own. The Norwegian ambassador to Angola also has a side accreditation to São Tomé and Príncipe. Notable Norwegian ambassadors in Luanda include Arild Retvedt Øyen (2002–2008).

== High level visits ==
Prime Minister of Norway Erna Solberg visited Angola in December 2018. This was the first visit by a Norwegian Prime Minister to Angola.

== See also ==
- Foreign relations of Angola
- Foreign relations of Norway
