= Paul Ignatius =

American government official (1920–2025)

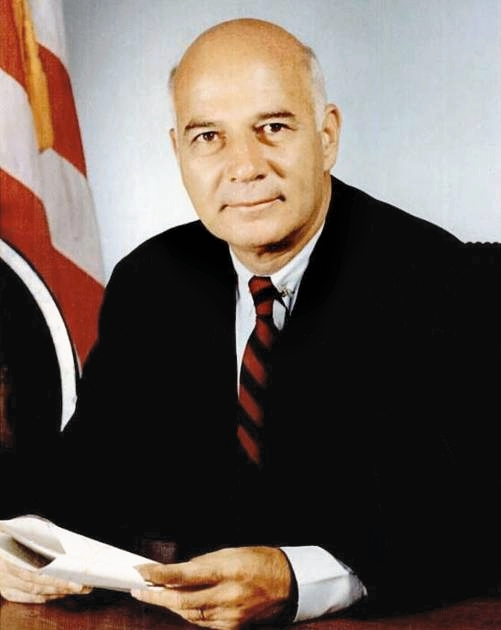
- Official portrait, c. 1967

59th United States Secretary of the Navy
- In office September 1, 1967 – January 24, 1969
- President: Lyndon B. Johnson; Richard Nixon
- Preceded by: Charles F. Baird (acting)
- Succeeded by: John Chafee

11th United States Under Secretary of the Army
- In office February 1964 – December 26, 1964
- President: Lyndon B. Johnson
- Preceded by: Stephen Ailes
- Succeeded by: Stanley Rogers Resor

Personal details
- Born: Paul Robert Ignatius; November 11, 1920 Glendale, California, U.S.
- Died: November 6, 2025 (aged 104) Washington, D.C., U.S.
- Spouse: Nancy Sharpless Weiser (m. 1947; died 2019)
- Children: 4, including David and Adi
- Education: University of Southern California (BA); Harvard University (MBA)

Military service
- Allegiance: United States
- Branch/service: United States Navy
- Years of service: 1943–1946
- Battles/wars: World War II

Paul Robert Ignatius (November 11, 1920 – November 6, 2025) was an American government official and businessman who served as the 59th United States Secretary of the Navy between 1967 and 1969 during the Lyndon B. Johnson administration. He had previously been the United States Under Secretary of the Army in 1964. During his time as Navy Secretary, Ignatius was the highest-ranking Armenian American in the United States government.

After government service, Ignatius served as president of The Washington Post newspaper and served as executive vice president of The Washington Post Company from 1969 until 1971. During his time with The Washington Post, Ignatius reluctantly oversaw the release of the Pentagon Papers, a decision that put him at odds with lead publisher Katharine Graham, who supported the release.

Ignatius also served as president and CEO of Air Transport Association and was a member of the board of trustees of the George C. Marshall Foundation and the Logistics Management Institute.

== Early life ==
Paul Robert Ignatius was born on November 11, 1920, in Glendale, California, the son of Armenian parents who migrated to the United States, Elisa (née Jamgochian; Armenian: Էլիզա Ջամգոչյան Իգնատոսյան) and Hovsep "Joseph" B. Ignatius (original last name – Ignatosian; Armenian: Հովսեփ Իգնատոսյան). Ignatius's ancestors came from the historic Armenian settlement of Ağın near Kharpert (present-day Elazığ, Turkey).

Ignatius received his bachelor's degree from the University of Southern California (Phi Beta Kappa and Phi Kappa Tau) and his MBA degree from Harvard Business School. During this time, he worked a temporary clerk at a U.S. Postal Office facility in Glendale.

Ignatius served as a commissioned lieutenant in the U.S. Navy in World War II, principally as an aviation ordnance officer aboard escort aircraft carrier USS Manila Bay (CVE-61) in the Pacific.

== Government career ==
In 1961, Ignatius began working at the Pentagon under U.S. Defense Secretary Robert S. McNamara. When he started his government career working with the John F. Kennedy administration, The New York Times noted in a 1967 article that both Ignatius and McNamara "demonstrate a certain coolness under fire, a grasp of small details in large, complicated problem areas, and an ability to organize and manage a staff effectively".

Ignatius began working as the Assistant Secretary for Installations and Logistics, a role he would hold from 1961 to 1967 under both Presidents Kennedy and Lyndon B. Johnson (under the Department of the Army from 1961 to February 1964, and then under the Department of Defense from December 26, 1964 to August 31, 1967). Ignatius briefly served as the Under Secretary of the Army from February 1964 to December 1964. He later worked exclusively for the U.S. Department of Defense from 1964 to 1967 during the Johnson administration. During this time, he focused on supply chains and preparing ports and bases for the Vietnam War.

=== U.S. Secretary of the Navy ===
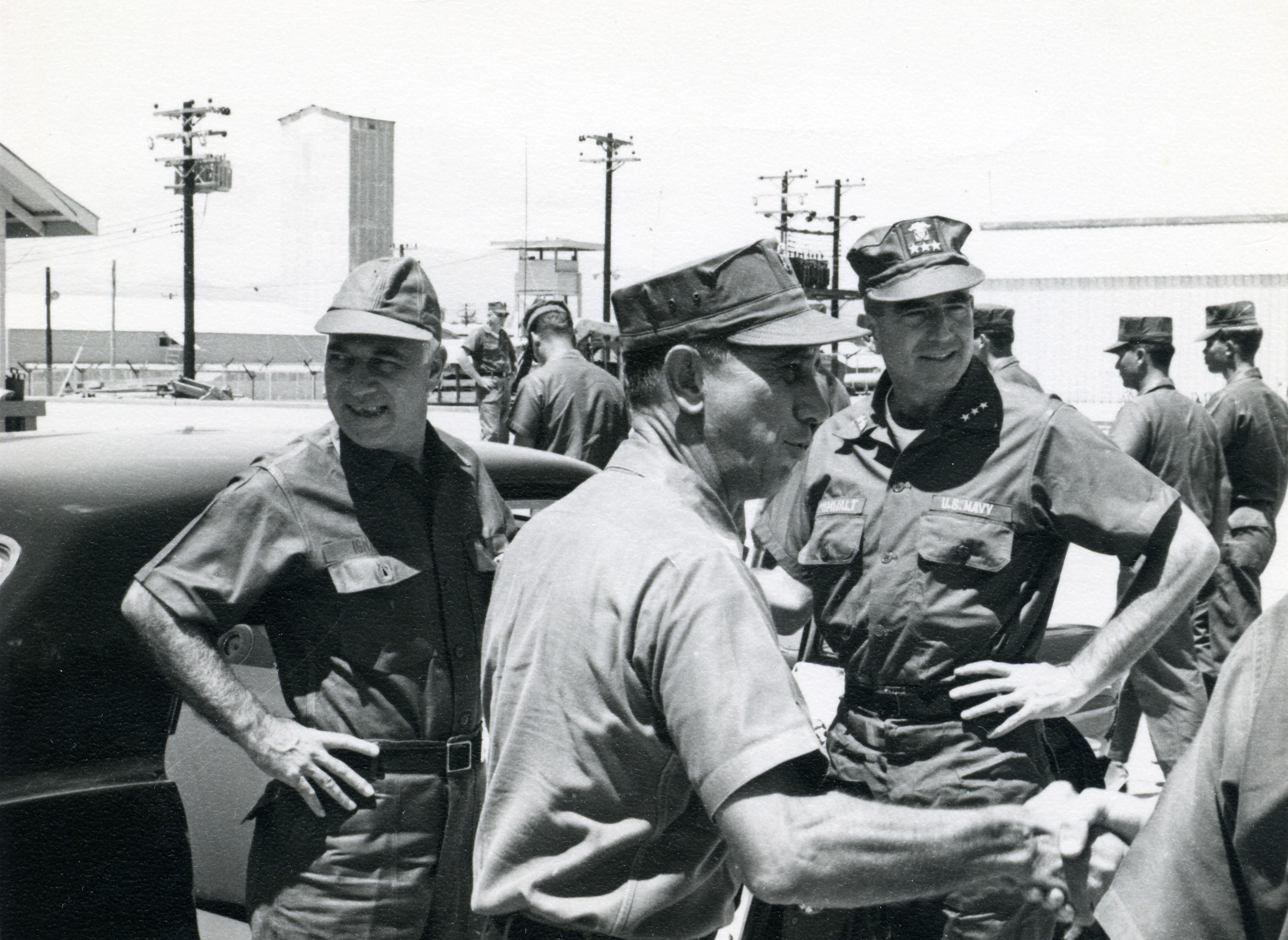
Ignatius (left) with Elmo Zumwalt and Meryl A. Liams at Cam Ranh Bay in 1968

In August 1967, President Johnson nominated Ignatius to serve as the United States Secretary of the Navy. Ignatius was nominated following the death of John McNaughton in an airplane crash. McNaughton was Johnson's original nominee to replace outgoing Secretary Paul Nitze. Ignatius was confirmed to the role by the U.S. Senate and sworn-in by Defense Secretary McNamara on September 1, 1967.

During his time as Navy secretary, Ignatius oversaw the military's actions during the Vietnam War. One of Ignatius's first acts as secretary was that he declined to formally reexamine the case of lieutenant commander Marcus Aurelius Arnheiter, who was relieved of his command during the Vietnam War. Ignatius supported the verdict in which Arnheiter was found to have violated Navy protocol and regulations by submitting false position reports and mishandling the navy engines.

Ignatius also oversaw the USS Pueblo incident in 1968, when a lightly armed U.S. Naval Intelligence vessel disguised as a research ship was captured off the coast of North Korea and resulted in the death of one crew member. The rest of the 83-person crew were tortured and held in a North Korean prison until the United States negotiated their release 11 months later.

Ignatius's tenure as Navy secretary ended in January 1969 shortly after Richard Nixon was inaugurated as president.

== President of The Washington Post ==
Shortly after leaving the Defense Department in 1969, Ignatius was named president of The Washington Post newspaper. He was executive vice president of The Washington Post Company. He was recommended to the role by former Defense Secretary McNamara, who was a friend of publisher Katharine Graham.

During his time with The Washington Post, Ignatius convinced Graham to expand their old offices rather than construct a new headquarters designed by I. M. Pei. Ignatius also led through a labor strike within the newspaper. Ignatius also unsuccessfully argued against the release of the Pentagon Papers. He joined with various lawyers of the Post not to publish the papers after receiving pushback from the Richard Nixon administration. Graham would eventually side with Benjamin C. Bradlee in releasing the papers.

After the Pentagon Papers were released, The Washington Post bought out his contract, ending Ignatius's tenure with the newspaper in 1971.

== Later career ==
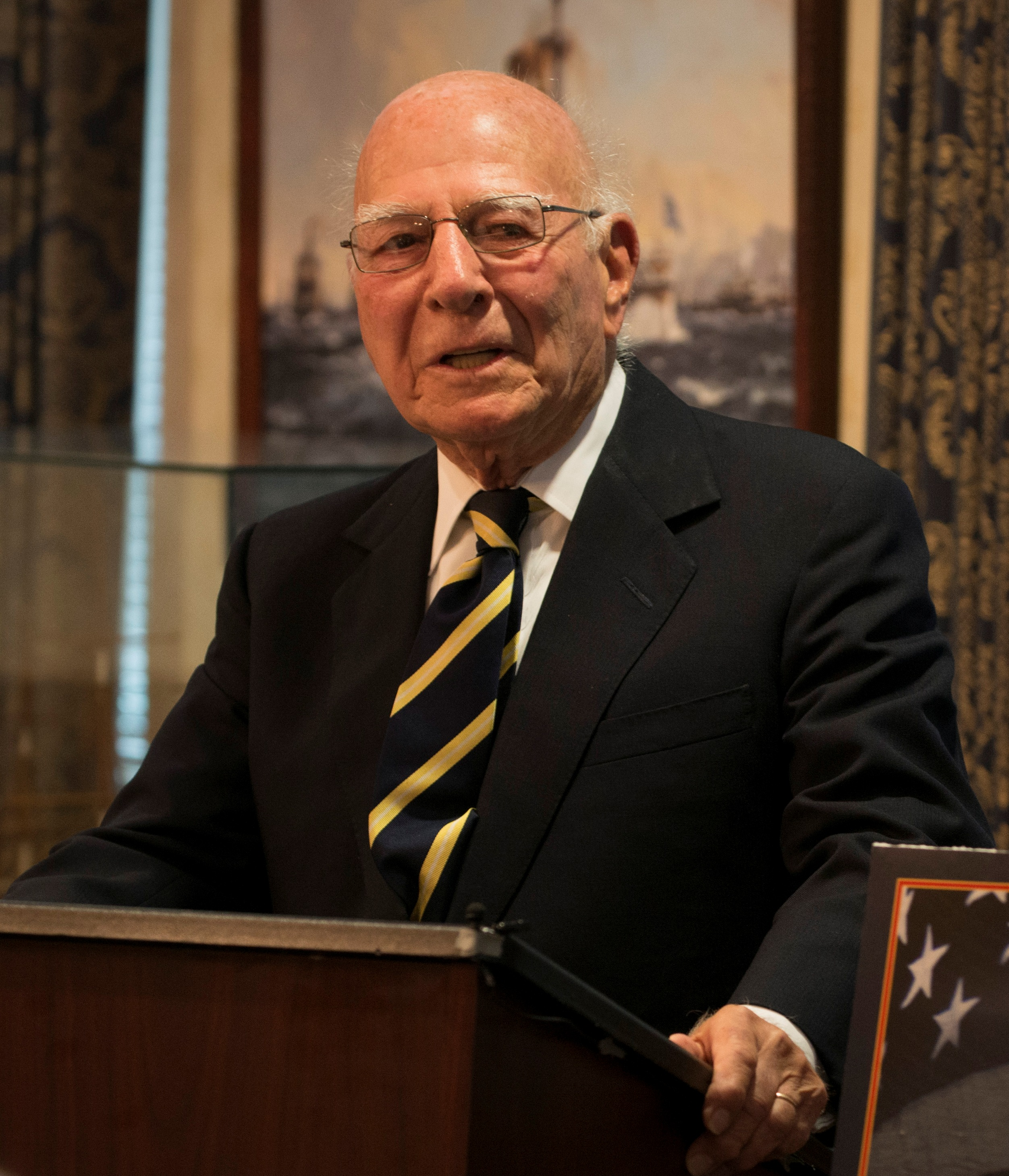
Ignatius in 2013

Ignatius was a trustee of the George C. Marshall Foundation and member of the Federal City Council. He also worked at the Washington Institute of Foreign Affairs. He was co-founder and chairman of the board of trustees for Logistics Management Institute.

Ignatius also served as chairman, president, and CEO of Air Transport Association. He founded Harbridge House, Inc., a Boston management consulting and research firm. He also authored two books: On Board: My Life in the Navy, Government, and Business and Now I Know in Part: Stories of My Growing Up.

Ignatius and his wife, Nancy, also served on the boards of charitable organizations and he was chairman of the St. Albans School of Public Service, which encouraged young people to consider careers in government.

== Personal life and death ==
Ignatius married Nancy Weiser Sharpless in 1947. Sharpless died in January 2019 from breast cancer. The couple lived in Washington, D.C.

He had two sons and two daughters. David Ignatius is a columnist for The Washington Post, and a novelist and Adi Ignatius is editor-in-chief of Harvard Business Review. Both daughters, Sarah and Amy, have practiced law. Amy Ignatius is a Superior Court Judge in New Hampshire. Sarah Ignatius is a non-profit executive director.

Ignatius turned 100 on November 11, 2020, and died at his home in Washington, D.C., on November 6, 2025, at the age of 104, five days from what would have been his 105th birthday.

== Legacy ==
On May 23, 2013, the Navy announced that an Arleigh Burke-class destroyer, USS Paul Ignatius (DDG-117) would be named for him. It was commissioned at Port Everglades, Florida, on July 27, 2019.

Ignatius was also inducted into the USC Hall of Fame and received honors at the Armenian American Museum and Cultural Center.

In July 2025, U.S. Senator Adam Schiff and U.S. Representative Laura Friedman introduced a bill to rename a U.S. Postal Service facility in Glendale after Ignatius.

Government offices
Preceded by Stephen Ailes	United States Under Secretary of the Army; 1964	Succeeded by Stanley Rogers Resor
Preceded by Charles F. Baird; Acting	United States Secretary of the Navy; 1967–1969	Succeeded by John Chafee
