= USS Paul Ignatius =

American guided missile destroyer

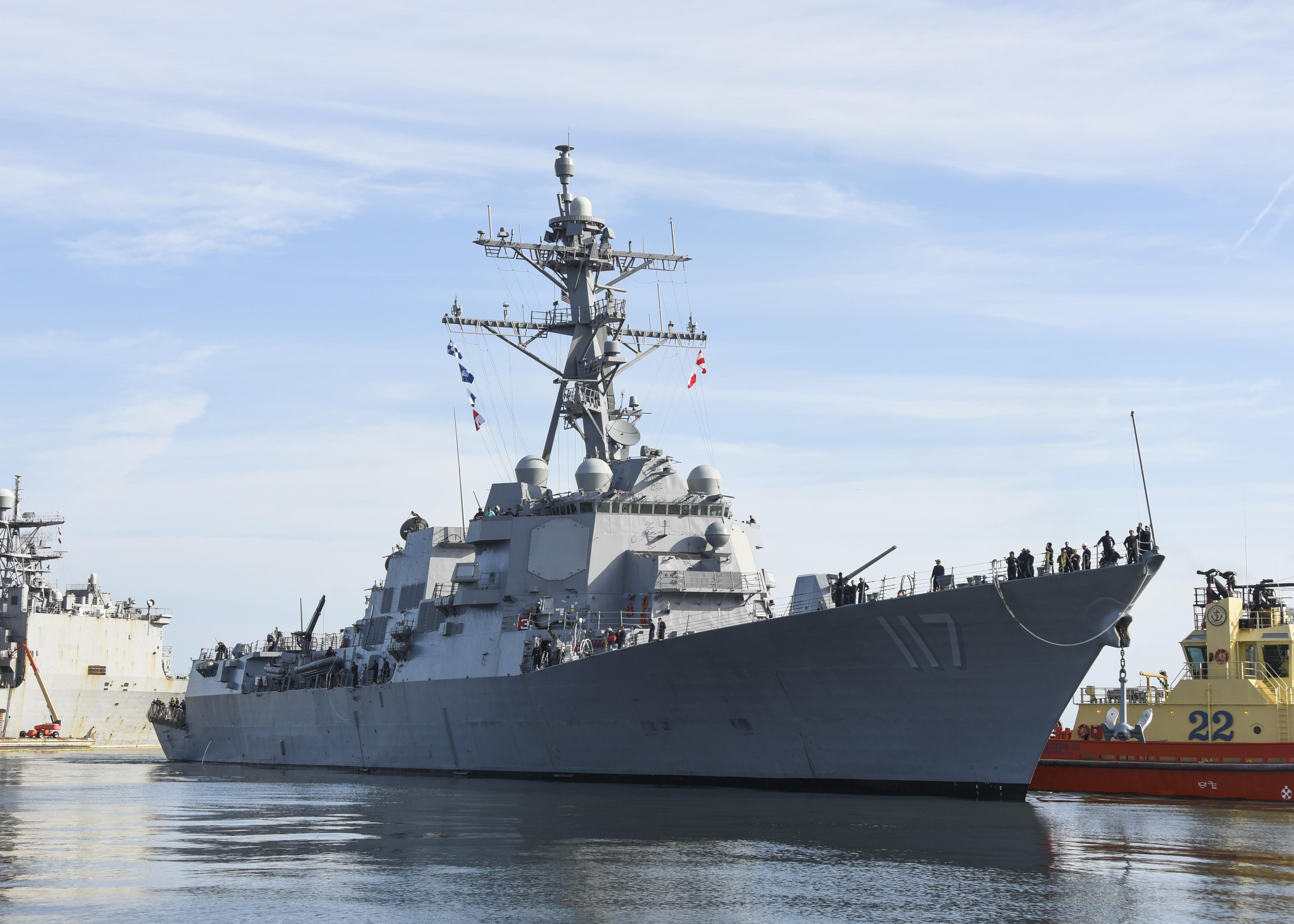
- USS Paul Ignatius on 31 July 2019

History

United States
- Name: Paul Ignatius
- Namesake: Paul Ignatius
- Builder: Ingalls Shipbuilding
- Laid down: 20 October 2015
- Launched: 12 November 2016
- Sponsored by: Nancy W. Ignatius
- Christened: 8 April 2017
- Acquired: 22 February 2019
- Commissioned: 27 July 2019
- Home port: Rota
- Identification: MMSI number: 368926407; Hull number: DDG-117
- Motto: Always ready, fight on
- Status: in active service
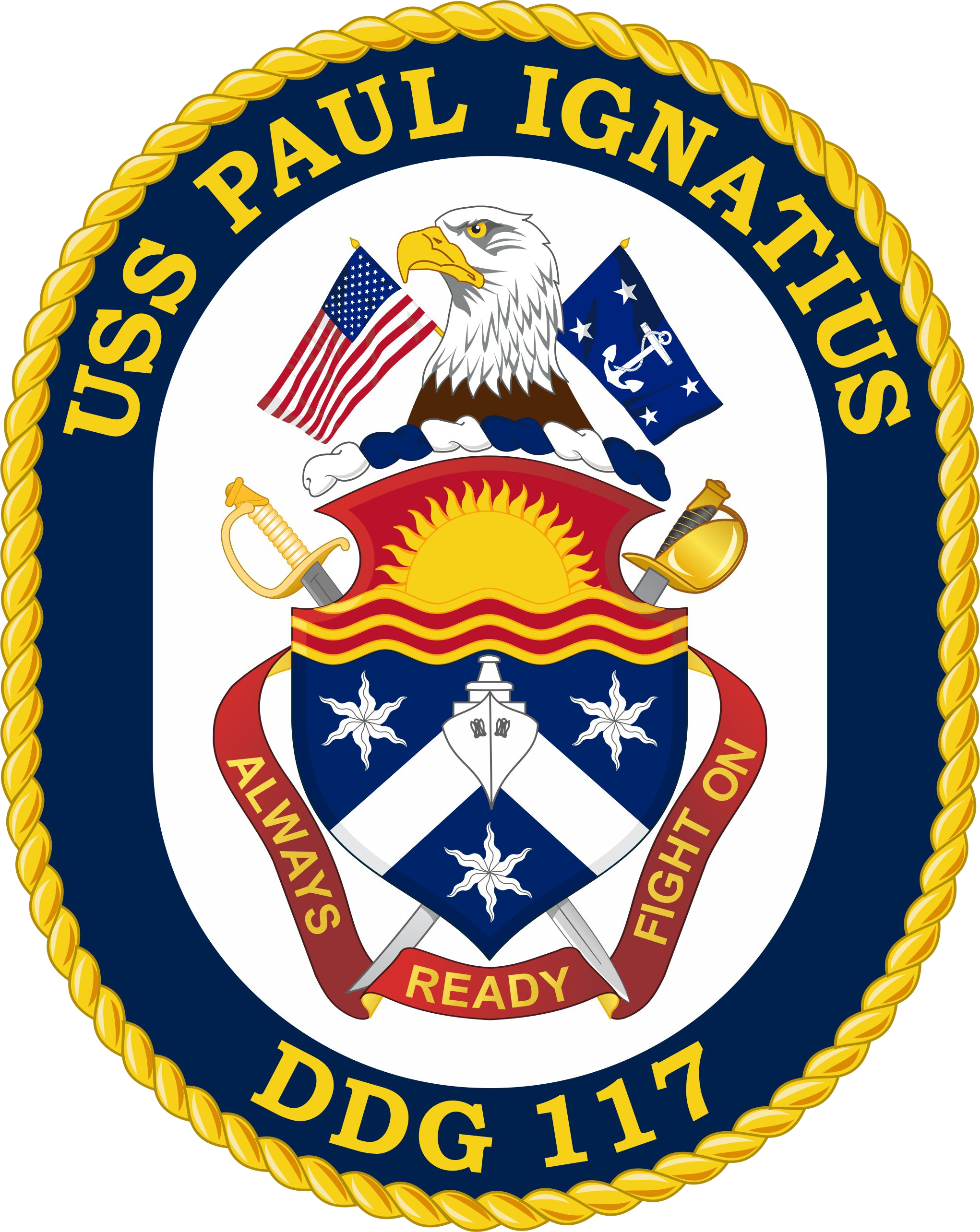
- Badge

General characteristics
- Class & type: Arleigh Burke-class destroyer, Flight IIA
- Displacement: 9,200 long tons (9,300 t)
- Length: 510 ft (160 m)
- Draft: 33 ft (10 m)
- Propulsion: 4 × General Electric LM2500 gas turbines 100,000 shp (75,000 kW)
- Speed: 30 kn (56 km/h; 35 mph)
- Complement: 380 officers and enlisted
- Armament: Guns: 1 × 5-inch (127 mm)/62 mk 45 mod 4 (lightweight gun); 1 × 20 mm (0.8 in) Phalanx CIWS; 2 × 25 mm (0.98 in) Mk 38 machine gun system; 4 × 0.50 inches (12.7 mm) caliber guns; Missiles: 1 × SeaRAM CIWS; 1 × 32-cell, 1 × 64-cell (96 total cells) Mk 41 vertical launching system (VLS): RIM-66M surface-to-airmissile; RIM-156 surface-to-air missile; RIM-174A standard ERAM; RIM-161 anti-ballistic missile; RIM-162 ESSM (quad-packed); BGM-109 Tomahawk cruise missile; RUM-139 vertical launch ASROC; Torpedoes: 2 × Mark 32 triple torpedo tubes: Mark 46 lightweight torpedo; Mark 50 lightweight torpedo; Mark 54 lightweight torpedo
- Aircraft carried: 2 × MH-60R Seahawk helicopters
- Aviation facilities: Double hangar and helipad

USS Paul Ignatius (DDG-117) is an Arleigh Burke-class (Flight IIA Technology Insertion) Aegis guided missile destroyer of the United States Navy. She is named for Paul Ignatius who served as United States Secretary of the Navy under President Lyndon Johnson from 1967 to 1969. Ignatius had previously served as a lieutenant in the Navy during World War II. Paul Ignatius is the second of eight planned Flight IIA "technology insertion" ships, which contain elements of the Flight III ships.

Paul Ignatius was launched on 12 November 2016, and was christened on 8 April 2017. She was commissioned on 27 July 2019 Port Everglades in Fort Lauderdale, Florida. The ship was sponsored by Ignatius's wife Nancy before her death and that role was taken over by their granddaughter, Dr. Elisa Ignatius. Paul Ignatius is homeported in Rota, Spain.

== Operational history ==
On 28 April 2022, Paul Ignatius departed Mayport, Florida, for a patrol in the US Sixth Fleet area of operations and a homeport shift to Naval Station Rota.

On 17 June 2022, Paul Ignatius arrived at her new homeport of in Rota, Spain. Her Phalanx CIWS was moved to the forward mount and she received the SeaRAM close-in weapon system on her aft mount.

In October 2022, Paul Ignatius conducted a routine patrol in the Baltic Sea, where she was accompanied by the support ship William McLean. After the 2022 Nord Stream pipeline sabotage the ship remained deployed there to safeguard regional energy interests and to guard the areas of the pipeline sabotage. During this period, she embarked personnel from diving, salvage, and explosive ordnance disposal (EOD) units to assist in security and assessment operations.

On December 25, 2025, Paul Ignatius participated in a military operation against Islamic State (ISIS) militants in northwest Nigeria, in collaboration with the Nigerian government and U.S. Africa Command (AFRICOM). The operation involved launching Tomahawk cruise missiles from the Paul Ignatius in the Gulf of Guinea, authorized by President Donald Trump.
