= Stephen E. Harding =

British biochemist

- Born: 2 August 1955 (age 71)

Academic background
- Education: Pembroke College, Oxford; University of Leicester
- Thesis: Modelling biological macromolecules in solution: The general tri-axial ellipsoid (1980)

Academic work
- Discipline: Biochemist
- Sub-discipline: Biomolecules; hydrodynamics; archaeological science
- Institutions: University of Bristol; University of Cambridge; University of Nottingham; University of Oslo

Stephen Ernest Harding (born 2 August 1955) is a British biochemist specialising in biomolecular hydrodynamics. Harding is currently Professor of Applied Biochemistry at the University of Nottingham, has been the Director of the National Centre of Macromolecular Hydrodynamics since its foundation in 1987 and is a member of the Centre for the Study of the Viking Age.

== Academic career ==
Harding studied at Pembroke College, Oxford, graduating with a Bachelor of Arts (BA) degree. He then undertook a Doctor of Philosophy (PhD) degree at the University of Leicester. His doctoral thesis was completed in 1980 and was titled "Modelling biological macromolecules in solution: The general tri-axial ellipsoid". After completing his doctorate, Harding was a Lister postdoctoral fellow at the University of Bristol and then an Oppenheimer postdoctoral fellow at the University of Cambridge. He was also a tutor in Biochemistry at Queens' College, Cambridge.

Besides developing and applying hydrodynamic methodology to biomolecules, Harding's notable work includes finding remarkable protein-like behaviour of carbohydrates and the discovery of high levels of Scandinavian genes in the ancestral population of coastal North West England. He is now part of the Saving Oseberg research team – finding natural polymer consolidants to replace the decayed cellulose and lignin in all the perilously fragile artefacts of the Oseberg Viking ship and in August 2017 appointed an adjunct Professor of the University of Oslo.

In 1991 he became a junior medallist of the Royal Society of Chemistry and in 2002 awarded a DSc from the University of Oxford. For his scientific and historical investigation of the Vikings in North West England, where he hails from, he was, in 2011, made a Knight of the 1st class of the Royal Norwegian Order of Merit by King Harald of Norway for his "outstanding service in the interests of Norway". He gave the 2016 Hakon Hakonsson Lecture at Largs, and the 2017 Svedberg lecture.

== Works ==
=== Papers ===
- Bowden, Georgina R.; Balaresque, Patricia; King, Turi E.; Hansen, Ziff; Lee, Andrew C.; Pergl-Wilson, Giles; Hurley, Emma; Roberts, Stephen J.; Waite, Patrick; Jesch, Judith; Jones, Abigail L.; Thomas, Mark G.; Harding, Stephen E.; Jobling, Mark A. (2008). "Excavating past population structures by surname-based sampling: the genetic legacy of the Vikings in Northwest England". Molecular Biology and Evolution. 25 (2): 301–309. doi:10.1093/molbev/msm255. PMC 2628767. PMID 18032405.
- Heinze, Thomas; Nikolajski, Melanie; Daus, Stephan, Besong, Tabot M.D., Michaelis, Nico; Berlin, Peter; Morris, Gordon A.; Rowe, Arthur J.; Harding, Stephen E. (2011) "Protein‐like Oligomerization of Carbohydrates", Angewandte Chemie International Edition. 50(37): 8602–8604.
- Harding, Stephen E. (2018) "The Svedberg Lecture 2017. From nano to micro: the huge dynamic range of the analytical ultracentrifuge for characterising the sizes, shapes and interactions of molecules and assemblies in Biochemistry and Polymer Science", European Biophysics Journal. 47(7): 697–707
- Wakefield, Jennifer M.K.; Gillis, Richard B.; Adams, Gary G.; McQueen, Caitlin, M.A.; Harding, Stephen E. (2018) "Controlled depolymerisation assessed by analytical ultracentrifugation of low molecular weight chitosan for use in archaeological conservation". European Biophysics Journal. 47(7): 769–775
- Full list of publications: Google Scholar

=== Books ===
- Harding, Stephen E.; Rowe, A.J.; Horton, J.C. (1992). Analytical ultracentrifugation in biochemistry and polymer science. Royal Society of Chemistry. ISBN 978-0851863450.
- Cavill, Paul; Harding, Stephen; Jesch, Judith (2000). Wirral and Its Viking Heritage. English Place-Name Society. ISBN 978-0-904889-59-8.
- Harding, Stephen (2002). Viking Mersey: Scandinavian Wirral, West Lancashire and Chester. Countyvise Limited. p. 240. ISBN 978-1-901231-3-42.
- Harding, Stephen; Jobling, Mark; King, Turi (2010). Viking DNA: The Wirral and West Lancashire Project. CRC Press. ISBN 978-1-466590-85-4.
- Harding, Stephen E. (2016). Ingimund's Saga : Viking Wirral. Chester University Press. ISBN 978-1908258304.
- Harding, Stephen (2017). Science and the Vikings. The Hakon Hakonsson Lecture, 2016. Largs & District Historical Society. ISBN 978-1-527207-0-66.
- Harding, Stephen; Tombs, Michael P.; Adams, Gary G.; Paulsen, Berit Smestad; Inngjerdingen, Kari Tvete; Barsett, Hilde (2017) An Introduction to Polysaccharide Biotechnology. 2nd Edition. CRC Press. ISBN 978-1482246971.
- Full list of books: Amazon.co.uk
