= Aqel Biltaji =

Jordanian civil servant (1941–2021)

Akel Biltaji
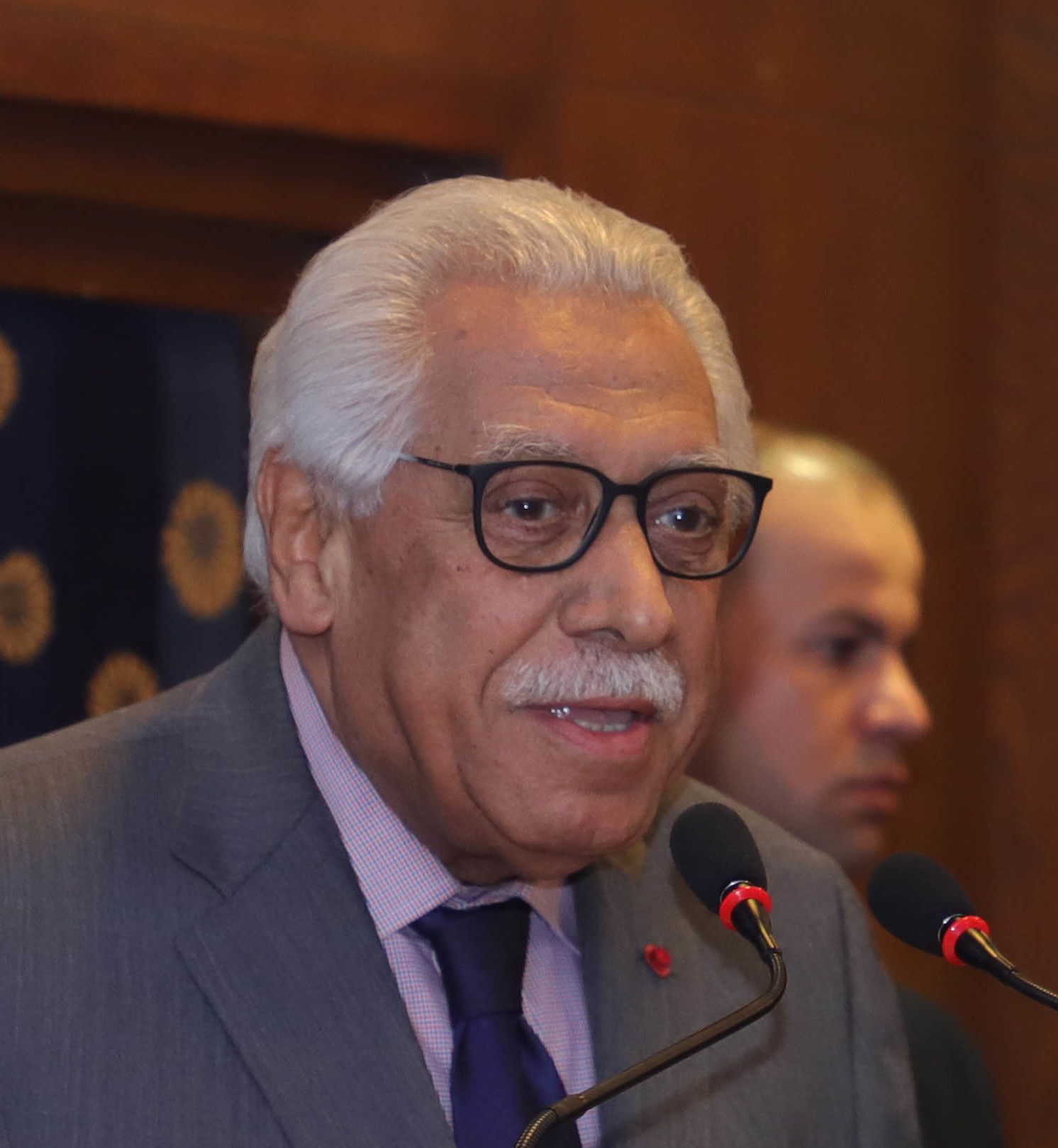
- Aqel Biltaji in December 2018

Mayor of Amman
- In office 8 September 2013 – 20 August 2017
- Preceded by: Abdul Halim Al-Kilani
- Succeeded by: Yousef Shawarbeh

Personal details
- Born: 10 February 1941 Gaza, Mandatory Palestine
- Died: 28 February 2021 (aged 80)

Aqel Biltaji (Arabic: عقل بلتاجي; 10 February 1941 – 28 February 2021) was a Jordanian, Palestinian politician who served as the mayor of Amman.

== Career ==
Biltaji was appointed by the government mayor of the Greater Amman Municipality in September 2013, from that date until August 2017. He occupied several positions over the course of his life, in Royal Jordanian Airlines and most famously as Minister of Tourism and tourism adviser to King Abdullah II and as chief of Aqaba's city council. From 2002 to 2004, he was the first Chief Commissioner of the newly created Aqaba Special Economic Zone.

== Death ==
On 28 February 2021, Biltaji died from complications related to COVID-19 during the COVID-19 pandemic in Jordan.

== Awards ==
- (Jordan) Highest Jordanian Orders
- (Austria) Austrian Grand Gold Merit
- (Norway) Royal Norwegian Order of Merit
- (Spain) Gran Cruz
- (France) French Commandeur de la Legion d'Honeur
- (France) French Grand Maitre de la Legion d'Honeur
- (France) Ordre National du Mérite
