= Kjell H. Halvorsen =

Norwegian diplomat

Kjell H. Halvorsen (4 May 1946 – 18 March 2006) was a Norwegian diplomat.

He graduated from the University of Oslo with a mag.art. degree (PhD equivalent) in political science in 1976, and worked at the University of Oslo from 1977 to 1983 before being hired in the Norwegian Agency for Development Cooperation in 1983 and the Ministry of Development Cooperation in 1984. He was promoted to assistant secretary, then sub-director, then deputy under-secretary of state in 1991, two years after the Ministry of Development Cooperation was incorporated into the Ministry of Foreign Affairs. From 1999 to 2003 he served as Norway's ambassador to Iceland. From 2003 to his death he served as leader of the Nordic Secretariat in the Ministry of Foreign Affairs. In 2000 he was decorated as a Commander of the Royal Norwegian Order of Merit. He was married and had one daughter, and died in March 2006 in Oslo.
