= Jon Westborg =

Norwegian diplomat

Jon Westborg (born 13 July 1946) is a Norwegian diplomat.

He holds a Master of Philosophy degree from the Cranfield School of Management. Before becoming a diplomat he worked in the Lutheran World Federation, Save the Children Norway, the Strømme Foundation (as secretary-general) and the Norwegian Agency for Development Cooperation. From 1996 to 2003 he served as the Norwegian ambassador to Sri Lanka, and from 2003 as the Norwegian ambassador to India. In 2007 Ann Ollestad took over.

In 1999 he was decorated as a Knight of the Royal Norwegian Order of Merit.

Diplomatic posts
Preceded by Truls Hanevold	Norwegian ambassador to India; 2003–2007	Succeeded by Ann Ollestad
