= Muhammed Bashir Ismail ash-Shishani =

Jordanian statesman and general (born 1933)

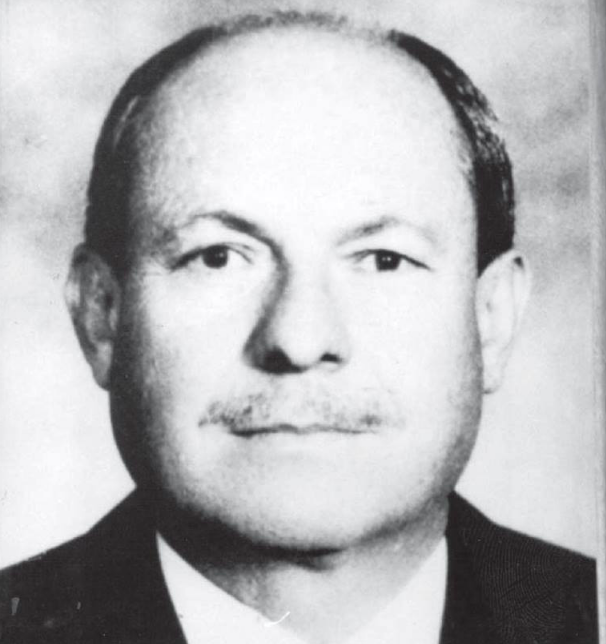
- Born: 1933 (age 91–92); Zarqa, Jordan
- Allegiance: Jordan
- Rank: General-Major
- Alma mater: Royal College of Defence Studies

Muhammad Bashir Ismail ash-Shishani (born 1933) is a Jordanian statesman and Major General of the Royal Jordanian Army, Bashir is also the former Minister of Agriculture of Jordan, and Mayor of Amman, he is of Chechen descent.

== Biography ==
Muhammed was born in the city of Zarqa, Jordan in 1933.

Muhammed studied military affairs in Pakistan. In 1963, he created the first Jordanian parachute unit. In 1964 he joined the united Arab command in Egypt. He was promoted to the command of an infantry brigade. In the mid-1960s, Bashir created the first military security unit, and later became the Director of Military Intelligence of Jordan.

In 1971, he was in command of Task Force (Special Forces). In the serine of the 1970s, he continued his military training at the Royal Defense College in London and a year later became Deputy Chief of Staff, after being appointed Brigadier General. In the same year he went on a leave, of his own free will.

Muhammad Bashir al-Shishani has held many important posts during his career. In addition to the posts of Minister of Agriculture and Mayor of Amman, he headed the military intelligence of Jordan, infantry troops, the union of military veterans among other posts.
