= Bjørn Olav Blokhus =

Norwegian diplomat (born 1947)

Bjørn Olav Blokhus (born 20 November 1947) is a Norwegian diplomat.

He is a cand.jur. by education, and started working for the Norwegian Ministry of Foreign Affairs in 1978. He was a press spokesman for the Ministry of Foreign Affairs from 1990 to 1992, embassy counsellor in Denmark from 1995 to 1999, head of department in the Ministry of Foreign Affairs from 1999 to 2003 before becoming ambassador. He was the Norwegian ambassador to Indonesia from 2003 to 2008 and Morocco from 2008 to 2009. During the Indonesia period he was also accredited as ambassador to Timor-Leste.

In 2009 he was decorated as Commander of the Royal Norwegian Order of Merit. He was a special adviser in the Ministry of Foreign Affairs from 2009 to 2010 and consul-general in Shanghai since 2010.
