= Jostein Helge Bernhardsen =

Norwegian diplomat

Jostein Helge Bernhardsen (18 June 1945 – 27 December 2023) was a Norwegian diplomat.

He started working for the Norwegian Ministry of Foreign Affairs in 1973 and was head of department in the ministry from 1995 to 2001. He was Norway's ambassador to Ukraine from 2001 to 2006 and to Belgium from 2006 to 2011.

Bernhardsen was appointed Knight 1st Class of the Royal Norwegian Order of Merit in 2002.
