= List of mayors of Amman =

List of mayors of the city of Amman

Mayor of Greater Amman Municipality
- أمين عمّان
- Incumbent; Ahmad Malkawi since 11 August 2026
- Style: His Excellency
- Appointer: The King of Jordan
- Inaugural holder: Ismael Babouk
- Formation: 1909
- Website: Office of the Mayor

The first municipal council in the capital city of Jordan, Amman, was established in 1909.

== List of Mayors ==
Authority		Mayor of Amman		Took office	Left office
Ottoman Empire	1		Ismael Babouk	1909	1911
Ottoman Empire	2		Ahmad Khatib	1911	1915
Ottoman Empire	3		As'ad Hamdokh	1915	1919
Ottoman Empire	4		Ayoub Fakhri Fakher	1919	1920
Arab Kingdom of Syria	5		Saeed Khair	1920	1925
Emirate of Transjordan	6		Yousef Asfour	1925	1931
Emirate of Transjordan	7		Taher Joqqa	1931	1933
Emirate of Transjordan	8		Alaeddin Touqan	1933	1937
Emirate of Transjordan	9		Sameh Hijazi (1st time)	1937	1938
Emirate of Transjordan	10		Saeed Mufti	1938	1939
Emirate of Transjordan	11		Hashem Khair	1939	1942
Emirate of Transjordan	12		Omar Hikmat	1942	1942
Emirate of Transjordan	13		Subhi Kahaleh	1942	1943
Emirate of Transjordan	14		Omar Zaki Afyouni	1943	1944
Emirate of Transjordan	15		Ra'fat Dajani	1944	1945
Emirate of Transjordan	16		Kamal Jayousi	1945	1945
EJ and HKJ	(9)		Sameh Hijazi (2nd time)	1945	1948
Hashemite Kingdom of Jordan	17		Abdulmajeed Adwan	1948	1948
Hashemite Kingdom of Jordan	18		Hazza' Majali	1948	1950
Hashemite Kingdom of Jordan	19		Abdulrahman Khalifa	1950	1952
Hashemite Kingdom of Jordan	20		Sadqi Qasem	1952	1952
Hashemite Kingdom of Jordan	21		Farhan Shubeilat (1st time)	1952	1953
Hashemite Kingdom of Jordan	22		Salman Sokkar	1953	1953
Hashemite Kingdom of Jordan	(21)		Farhan Shubeilat (2nd time)	1953	1955
Hashemite Kingdom of Jordan	23		Omar Matar	1955	1957
Hashemite Kingdom of Jordan	24		Deifallah Hmoud	1957	1960
Hashemite Kingdom of Jordan	25		Hassan Sido Kurdi	1960	1962
Hashemite Kingdom of Jordan	26		Basheer Shureiki	1962	1964
Hashemite Kingdom of Jordan	27		Ahmad Fawzi	1964	1973
Hashemite Kingdom of Jordan	28		Mohammed Touqan	1973	1976
Hashemite Kingdom of Jordan	29		Maen Abu Nowar	1976	1979
Hashemite Kingdom of Jordan	30		Issam Ajlouni	1980	1982
Hashemite Kingdom of Jordan	31		Abdelraouf Al-Rawabdeh	1983	1989
Hashemite Kingdom of Jordan	32		Ali Suheimat	1989	1991
Hashemite Kingdom of Jordan	33		Muhammed Bashir ash-Shishani	1991	1993
Hashemite Kingdom of Jordan	34		Mamdouh Abbadi	1993	1998
Hashemite Kingdom of Jordan	35		Nidal Hadid	1998	2006
Hashemite Kingdom of Jordan	36		Omar Maani	2006	2011
Hashemite Kingdom of Jordan	37		Ammar Gharaibeh (Acting mayor)	2011	2012
Hashemite Kingdom of Jordan	38		Abdulhaleem Al-Kailani (Acting mayor)	2012	2013
Hashemite Kingdom of Jordan	39		Aqel Biltaji	2013	2017
Hashemite Kingdom of Jordan	40		Yousef Shawarbeh	2017	2026
41		Ahmad Malkawi	2026	present	
