= Ann Ollestad =

Norwegian diplomat

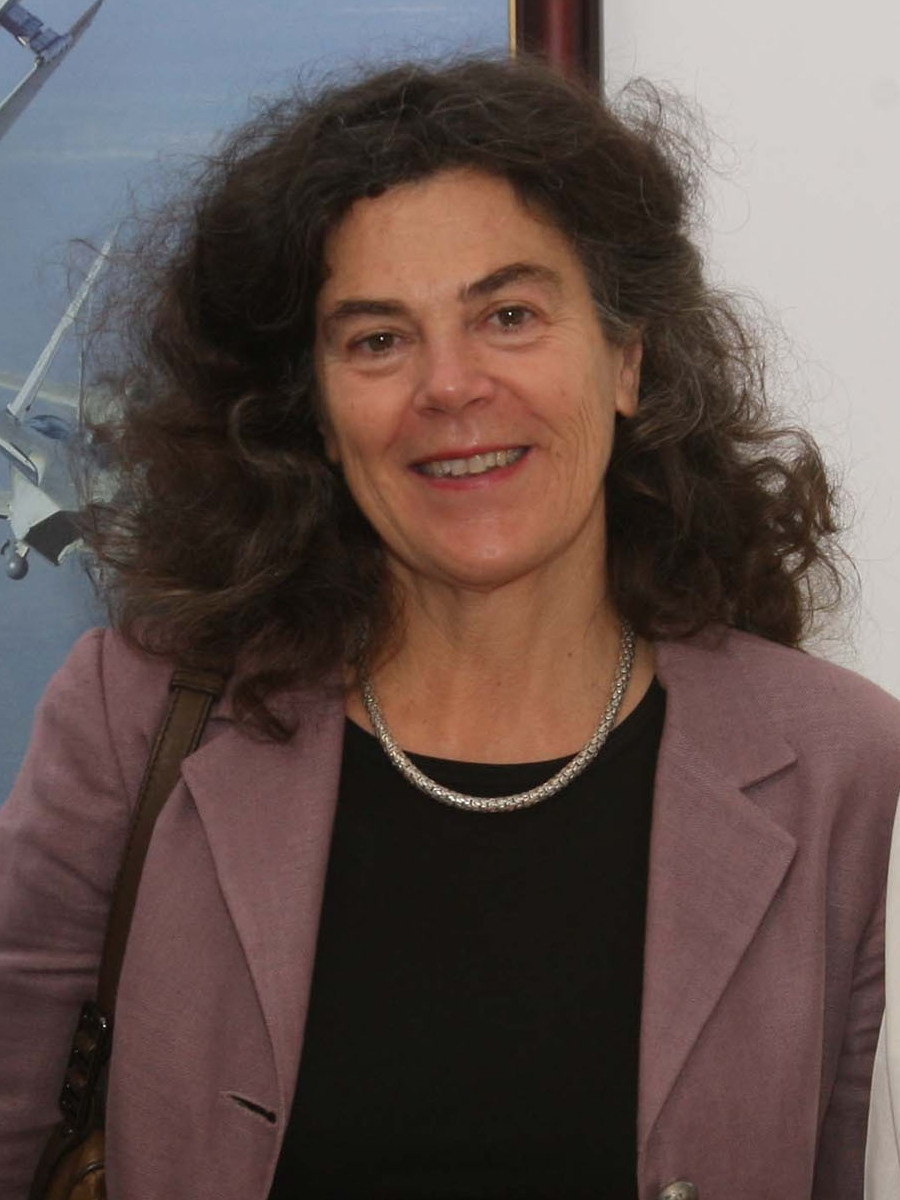
- Ann Ollestad in November 2011

Norwegian Ambassador to Myanmar
- In office 2013–2016

Norwegian Ambassador to India
- In office 2007–2012
- Preceded by: Jon Westborg
- Succeeded by: Eivind S. Homme

Norwegian Ambassador to Bhutan
- In office 2007–2012

Personal details
- Born: 3 August 1952 (age 74) Oslo, Norway

Ann Ollestad (born 3 August 1952) is a Norwegian diplomat and was the country's ambassador to Myanmar from 2013 to 2016.

Born in Oslo, she graduated as cand.polit. in 1983. She then mainly worked in the Ministry of Foreign Affairs, including posts in Paris, Bonn and Geneva.

In 2000, she was appointed deputy under-secretary of State in the Ministry of Foreign Affairs. She held this position until 2007, when she was appointed Norwegian ambassador to India. Before the year ended, her ambassadorship was extended to Bhutan.

In 2013, she was appointed ambassador of the newly opened Norwegian embassy in Yangon.

Diplomatic posts
Preceded by Jon Westborg	Norwegian ambassador to India; 2007–2012	Succeeded by Eivind S. Homme
