= Sjur Torgersen =

Norwegian diplomat and ambassador

Sjur Helge Torgersen (12 March 1946 – 7 September 2005) was a Norwegian diplomat and ambassador.

He was a cand.jur. (jurist) by education. After first serving as a local magistrate in Mandal, Norway, he joined the Norwegian Foreign Service in 1979, after establishing Norway's consular visa office in Islamabad, Pakistan, on behalf of the Norwegian Ministry of Justice in 1977. Before completing his admission to the diplomatic ranks he worked for the Norwegian Refugee Council providing emergency aid for arriving Afghan refugees in Pakistan after the Russian invasion of Afghanistan. His first posting for the Ministry of Foreign Affairs, from 1981 to 1984, was as Secretary of Embassy at the Norwegian embassy in Jakarta. He was then transferred to West Berlin where he served as military attaché in the allied occupational forces in West Berlin between 1984 and 1987. In 1989 he returned to Islamabad, Pakistan where he served as charge d'affairs until 1995. Between 1995 and 1998 he was assistant secretary and sub-director in the Ministry of Foreign Affairs. From 1998 to 2003 he served as Norway's ambassador to Indonesia. When East Timor became independent in 2002, he received responsibility for that country too, after being heavily involved in supporting the fledgling nation and developing deep personal relationships with East Timor's leaders, Ramos Horta and Xanana Gusmão.

In 1999 he was decorated as a Knight of the Royal Norwegian Order of Merit.

After the 2004 Indian Ocean earthquake, Torgersen was tasked with operating the Ministry of Foreign Affairs' crisis aid to Norwegian tourists in the area. Shortly thereafter he was diagnosed with cancer and died in September 2005.
