= Body of Lies (film) =

2008 film by Ridley Scott

- Theatrical release poster
- Directed by: Ridley Scott
- Screenplay by: William Monahan
- Based on: Body of Lies by David Ignatius
- Produced by: Ridley Scott; Donald De Line
- Starring: Leonardo DiCaprio; Russell Crowe; Mark Strong; Golshifteh Farahani; Oscar Isaac; Simon McBurney
- Cinematography: Alexander Witt
- Edited by: Pietro Scalia
- Music by: Marc Streitenfeld
- Production companies: Scott Free Productions; De Line Pictures
- Distributed by: Warner Bros. Pictures
- Release date: October 10, 2008
- Running time: 128 minutes
- Country: United States
- Language: English
- Budget: $67.5–70 million
- Box office: $119 million

Body of Lies is a 2008 American action thriller film directed and produced by Ridley Scott, written by William Monahan, and starring Leonardo DiCaprio, Russell Crowe and Golshifteh Farahani in the lead roles. The supporting cast features Mark Strong and Oscar Isaac. Set in the Middle East, it follows the attempts of the CIA and the GID of Jordan to catch terrorist Al-Saleem. Frustrated by their target's elusiveness, differences in their approaches strain relations between a CIA operative, his superior, and the head of Jordanian Intelligence.

The screenplay, based on the 2007 novel by David Ignatius, examines contemporary tension between Western and Arab societies, and the comparative effectiveness of technological and human counter-intelligence methods. Principal photography for the film began on September 5, 2007, and concluded in December 2007. The film was shot largely on location in the United States and Morocco, after authorities in Dubai refused permission to film there because of the script's political themes.

The film was released in the United States on October 10, 2008, by Warner Bros. Pictures. The film received mixed reviews from critics, who praised Scott's direction and visual style, as well as the performances of its two leads, but criticized his formulaic handling of the story and use of conventions from the spy genre, such as surveillance shots from high-altitude spy drones. The film grossed $119 million worldwide on a budget of $67.5–70 million.

== Plot ==
After bombings in Sheffield, UK, police raid an apartment in Manchester, but the terrorists inside trigger an explosion, destroying the building. In Samarra, Iraq, CIA officer Roger Ferris is tracking Al-Saleem, the elusive leader of the terrorist cell. Ferris and fellow operative Bassam meet Nizar, a member of Al-Saleem's organization offering information in return for asylum in the US.

Despite the objections of division chief Ed Hoffman, his supervisor in Langley, Ferris plans to use Nizar to draw out the cell; instead, Nizar is captured, forcing Ferris to shoot and kill him to protect his own cover. Ferris and Bassam search for a terrorist safe house identified by Nizar in Balad, where they see documents and DVDs being burned. A shootout ensues, and Ferris and Bassam flee with disks salvaged from the fire, but their vehicle is hit by a rocket-propelled grenade; Bassam is killed, and Ferris is rescued by helicopter.

The intelligence recovered from Balad indicates another Al-Saleem safe house in Amman, Jordan, where Hoffman installs Ferris as CIA station chief. Ferris earns the respect of Hani Salaam, head of the Jordanian General Intelligence Directorate, ignoring Hoffman's orders by sharing information. While Ferris, his subordinate Skip, and Jordanian agents surveil a suspected terrorist from the safe house, a local asset sent by Hoffman spooks the target, who flees. Ferris chases the target into an alley, stabbing him to death before he can warn the safe house. Bitten by nearby dogs, Ferris is treated by Aisha, a nurse from Iran.

Ferris lambastes Hoffman for interfering with his operation, while Salaam confirms that the terrorists believe the target was killed in a random robbery, and has Ferris watch his agents torture the local asset as a warning to Hoffman. Al-Saleem's network strikes again, carrying out a deadly bombing at an Amsterdam flower market. Recognizing petty criminal Mustaffa Karami from the safe house, Salaam brings Ferris to the desert where he coerces Karami into cooperating. Hoffman arrives in Amman, seeking access to Karami as an intelligence asset, but Salaam refuses. Unbeknownst to Ferris, Hoffman tasks Skip to abduct Karami, who escapes. Capturing Skip, Salaam shows Ferris that the terrorists have burned the safe house and disappeared; accusing Ferris of deceiving him, Salaam exiles him from Jordan.

Returning to Washington, D.C., Ferris devises a plan with Hoffman to find Al-Saleem. Assisted by Garland, a black ops technical expert, Ferris poses as a Dubai financier to incriminate Omar Sadiki, an innocent Jordanian architect, as a terrorist mastermind in hopes Al-Saleem will contact Sadiki. Invited back to Jordan by Salaam, Ferris feigns ignorance about Sadiki, successfully framing him as the instigator of a staged attack on Incirlik Air Base, and spends time with Aisha and her family. Ferris attempts to bring Sadiki in for his own safety, but Skip is nearly killed when Sadiki is captured by the real terrorists and brought to Al-Saleem. Sadiki denies any knowledge of the attack but reveals his connection to Ferris, and is killed.

Discovering Aisha has been kidnapped, Ferris admits to Salaam he fabricated Sadiki's terrorist ties, but Salaam refuses to help. Ferris offers himself to Al-Saleem in exchange, with Hoffman monitoring by drone, but the terrorists create a cloud of dust and escape with Ferris in separate vehicles. Taken across the border to Ba'athist Syria, he is interrogated by Al-Saleem, who breaks two of his fingers with a hammer and leaves him to be executed on camera. Before Ferris can be beheaded, he is rescued by Salaam’s agents, and Al-Saleem is arrested.

Salaam visits Ferris in the hospital, revealing he faked Aisha's abduction and used Karami as a double-agent, orchestrating Ferris's capture to lead him to Al-Saleem. Having lost the will to fight in this particular war, Ferris turns down a promotion from Hoffman and leaves the CIA, hoping to see Aisha again.

== Cast ==
- Leonardo DiCaprio as Roger Ferris, a field officer working in the CIA's Near East Division and later CIA Station Chief of Amman, Jordan.
- Russell Crowe as Ed Hoffman, chief of the CIA's Near East Division and Ferris's boss.
- Mark Strong as Hani Salaam, intelligence chief and director of the Jordanian General Intelligence Directorate.
- Golshifteh Farahani as Aisha, a nurse in Amman and Ferris' love interest.
- Oscar Isaac as Bassam, CIA field operative in Iraq and Ferris' associate.
- Ali Suliman as Omar Sadiki, a Jordanian architect with very low-profile contact with Al-Qaeda and CIA's mole to catch Al-Saleem.
- Alon Abutbul as Al-Saleem, head of an independent terrorist group based in Jordan, aligned with Al-Qaeda.
- Vince Colosimo as Skip, CIA field operative in Jordan.
- Simon McBurney as Garland, a computer geek employed by the CIA to instrument black ops.
- Mehdi Nebbou as Nizar, former linguist, Al-Qaeda operative and attempted defector.
- Michael Gaston as Holiday, Ferris's predecessor as CIA's Jordan station chief.
- Kais Nashef as Mustafa Karami, former petty criminal-turned-Al-Qaeda operative under Al-Saleem who later became Hani Salaam's informer.
- Jameel Khoury as Marwan Se-Kia, GID operative and security officer of Hani Salaam.
- Lubna Azabal as Cala, Aisha's sister.
- Annabelle Wallis as Hani's Girlfriend in Bar.
- Michael Stuhlbarg as Ferris's Attorney.
- Giannina Facio as Hoffman's wife.

Carice van Houten was cast as Roger's wife Gretchen Ferris, but her scenes were deleted and she does not appear in the final cut.

== Themes ==
Ridley Scott has made a previous film about the conflict between the Western and Arab civilizations, Kingdom of Heaven (2005), set during the Crusades. Body of Lies resumes this theme in the context of modern intelligence operations and terrorism.

The film puts two contrasting characters on the same side. Ferris, the CIA man on the ground, is a dedicated Arabist fluent in the language; he relies on trust, local knowledge and HUMINT. Hoffman, his superior, who is detached at home in Washington, D.C., and at the CIA in Virginia, is more Machiavellian: he authorizes deceit, double-crossing, and violence by telephone and without scruple. The New Yorker interpreted him as "a greedy, American domestic animal—an advanced-media freak, always eating".

Early in the film, Hoffman explains to his superiors that the terrorists' retreat to pre-tech age communication methods renders useless the high specification tools the CIA uses, which increases the worth of Ferris's human intelligence methods. The terrorists avoid mobile telephones and computers, preferring face-to-face communication and encoded written messages. By contrast, the Americans use sophisticated communication (Hoffman and Ferris regularly speak on the phone) and surveillance technology (high altitude spy planes offer a different point of view throughout).

David Denby of The New Yorker said this was Scott's suggestion that the CIA has the technology but not the human intelligence to properly fight terrorism in the Middle East. Despite Hoffman's distance, the force and unintended consequences of his schemes are often borne by Ferris. The difference is underlined when Ferris, suffering weakened credibility, injured colleagues and personal risk, is reminded by Hoffman that "we are a results-driven organization".

== Production ==
=== Development ===
It's about Islam, where we are and where we're not, and it's a very interesting, proactive, internalized view of that whole subject.

— Ridley Scott

In March 2006, Warner Bros. Pictures hired screenwriter William Monahan to adapt the novel Penetration by David Ignatius into a feature film, which would be directed by Ridley Scott. In April 2007, with the novel re-titled Body of Lies and the film similarly re-titled, actor Leonardo DiCaprio was cast in the lead role. DiCaprio chose to pursue the role because he considered it a throwback to political films in the 1970s such as The Parallax View (1974) and Three Days of the Condor (1975). DiCaprio dyed his hair brown, and wore brown contacts for the role. After DiCaprio was cast, Russell Crowe was courted for a supporting role, to which he formally committed after Monahan's script was revised by Steve Zaillian, who wrote Scott and Crowe's American Gangster.

Crowe gained 63 pounds to suit his role. The actor said as a result of the film's exploration of the American government and foreign policy, "I don't think it will be very popular, but that's never been part of my project choice process".

Mark Strong, who plays Hani Salaam, the head of the Jordanian General Intelligence Directorate (GID), ascribed his casting to his performances in the 2005 films Syriana and Oliver Twist. The character Haani Salaam was modeled after the 2000–2005 GID chief Sa'ad Khair (1953–2009), whose involvement, according to the original author David Ignatius, in sharply handled interrogations without the use of torture, an encounter with a jihadist with his mother on the phone and being called the "fingernail boss" were nearly accurate in the film. Indian filmmaker Anurag Kashyap revealed in an interview that Bollywood actor Nana Patekar was approached by Ridley Scott for the role of Hani Salaam after watching his performance in The Pool, but the former declined the offer, refusing to portray a terrorist.

=== Location and design ===
Scott sought to film in Dubai in the United Arab Emirates, but the federation's National Media Council denied the director permission due to the script's politically sensitive nature. As a result, scenes set in Jordan were filmed in Morocco. The shoot took place over sixty-five days from September to December 2007. It was filmed in the United States and Morocco, where scenes set in ten different countries were filmed.

Filming began on September 5, 2007, at the Eastern Market, Washington, D.C. Practical locations were used throughout; part of the Capitol Hill neighborhood was converted to resemble a wintry Amsterdam to film a ten- to fifteen-second car bomb explosion. Scenes set in the CIA headquarters in Langley, Virginia, were filmed at the National Geographic offices in Gaithersburg, Maryland. Both buildings were set in woodland, and "it was eerily similar in terms of architectural style", said production designer Arthur Max. "We were given several empty floors." Locations in Baltimore also stood in for Manchester, England, and Munich, Germany, although the final cut of the movie did not have scenes that took place in Munich.

Production moved to Morocco, where Scott, Max and cinematographer Alexander Witt had filmed several times before. Their previous experience meant they "knew every stone in the desert", and they were allowed access to many locations, including the Ministry of Finance, which was dressed as Jordan's secret service headquarters, Casablanca airport and a military airfield.

The basketball stadium in Rabat was used as the U.S. embassy in Jordan: a CIA office set was built inside the stadium, favored because its design allowed the cameras to shoot both interior and exterior vistas, thus showing the characters looking out at people and tanks passing in the streets. A nine-week shoot also took place at CLA Studios and in the desert near the city of Ouarzazate.

=== Cinematography ===
Body of Lies was Alexander Witt's first credit as a director of photography; he had previously collaborated with Ridley Scott on six feature films, beginning as a second unit camera operator on Black Rain (1989). He shot the film in the Super 35 format with spherical lenses, and explained that these lenses offer more flexibility for interior and night pictures than the anamorphic alternative. They used Kodak Vision2 500T 5218 instead of Technicolor's OZ process, which did not perform well in tests in the Moroccan desert.

Scott is known for his skill at filming with multiple camera set-ups, and Body of Lies used a simultaneous minimum of three. Witt explained the benefits: "Actors like multiple cameras because they're always on-camera, so they're always in character and not wasting time off-camera". One shot of DiCaprio alone in the desert, for example, still used three cameras: one hand-held above the actor, a second capturing a three-quarter back profile, and the third photographing a close-up through the first cameraman's legs. Richard Cronn, the gaffer, attributed the success of this difficult approach to Scott's filmmaking intelligence: "Ridley will stand at the monitors and tell you what's he's looking for – he'll look at four monitors and say, 'I'm cutting from this to this to this.' He knows exactly how he will cut it."

In line with the film's use of practical locations, the photography and design departments worked together to incorporate practical light sources such as "lots of bare bulbs, lots of primitive fixtures". In the climactic torture scene, filmed in an ancient, windowless prison cell outside of Rabat, they used only diegetic light: two strong torches carried by the actors playing the torturers. It was filmed with three cameras and bounce cards were used to reflect light onto the actors' faces. Just a little smoke was sprayed in to augment the atmosphere but not dull the contrast.

Scott has used many gradations of lens filter in the past, but declined to do so on Body of Lies. One obtains better finesse using the digital intermediate during post-production and does not risk losing light while selecting filters during expensive on-set time. The filmmakers strove for authenticity and realism in the images, and as such little colouration was added after, and the natural contrast of colours between the locations in Washington and Morocco were allowed to show through.

In the film, images from unmanned aerial drones show the viewer the point of view of CIA commanders in Washington. These were filmed by John Marzano (aerial director of photography) using a helicopter mounted with a Wescam 35 on the nose of a helicopter, and Cineflex's V14 surveillance system, hanging from the side. Its 1–40 zoom allowed the filmmakers to fly very high and then zoom out of Ferris strolling through a market-place, creating the film's final shot.

=== Music ===
The film score was composed by Marc Streitenfeld, who has composed music for Ridley Scott for three features. He recorded the orchestral portions of his score at the Eastwood Scoring Stage at Warner Bros. Studios Burbank.

Of note is the song "If the World", performed by Guns N' Roses, and taken from their album Chinese Democracy. The track plays during the end credits but is not included on the official film soundtrack album. Streitenfeld also collaborated with Mike Patton and Serj Tankian on the song "Bird's Eye", which was written specially for the musical score of the film. It is not included on the soundtrack album, but was released separately as a single.

== Release ==
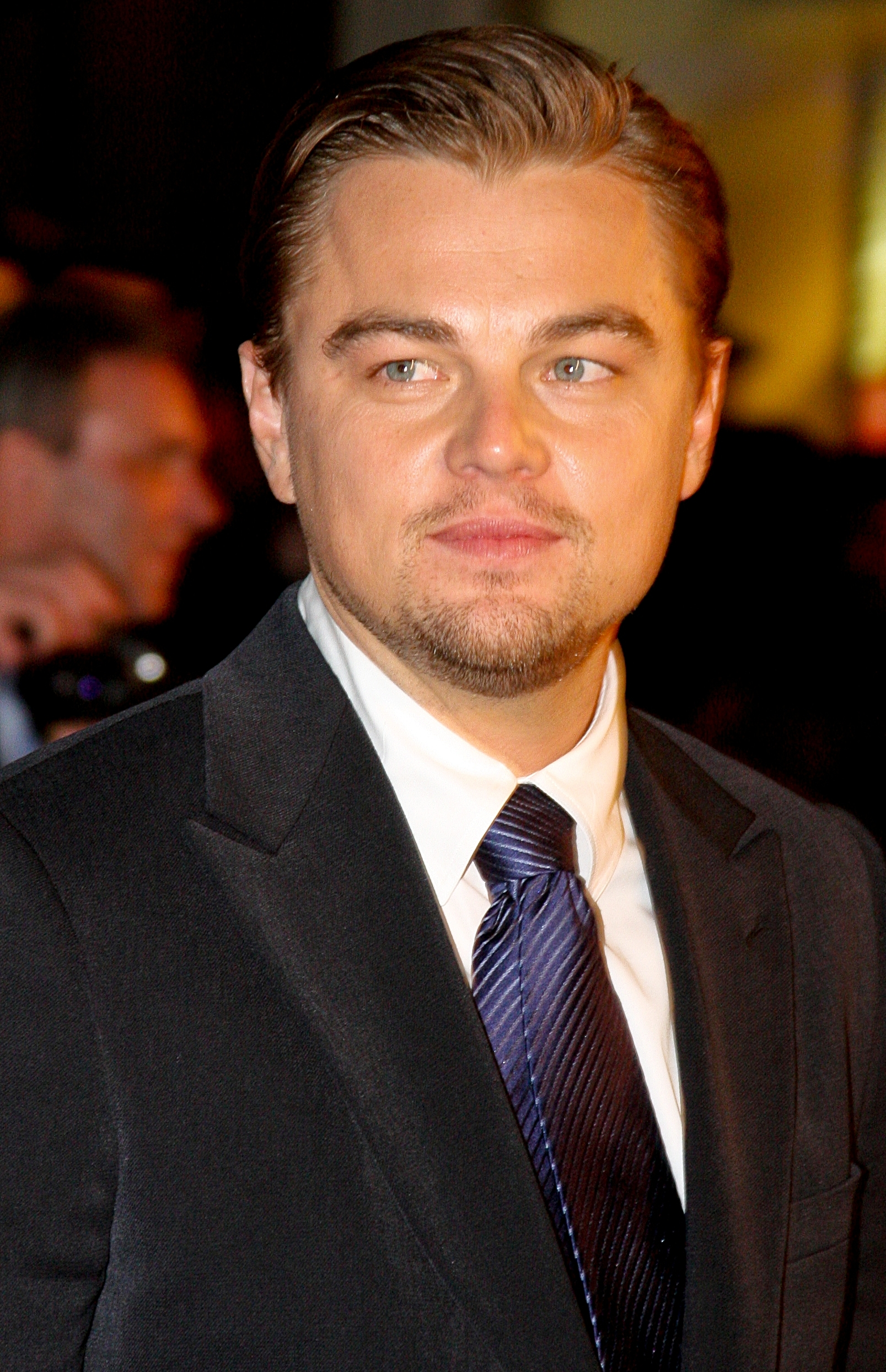
Leonardo DiCaprio at the London premiere of the film

The film was commercially released in the United States on October 10, 2008. The film has also been purchased by Turner Broadcasting System to screen on the television networks TBS and Turner Network Television.

The film was screened on September 30, 2008, at Michigan Technological University, and on October 2, 2008, at Duke University, New York Film Academy, University of Maryland and University of Virginia. It was also pre-screened on October 3 at Worcester Polytechnic Institute, at Michigan State University, at the University of Michigan, the University of Kansas, East Carolina University, and the University of Chicago on October 7 and at Carnegie Mellon University, Cornell University, Rensselaer Polytechnic Institute, The University at Buffalo, Columbia University, James Madison University, Syracuse University, the University of Colorado, the University of Washington, and Georgia Southern University on October 9.

Warner Home Video released Body of Lies on DVD on February 17, 2009. The single-disc Region-1 release includes Surround sound and subtitles in English, French and Spanish. The two-disc special edition includes commentaries by the director, screenwright and original novel author, and a behind-the-scenes documentary; the Blu-ray edition also includes additional commentary on the film's themes.

== Reception ==
=== Box office ===
Body of Lies earned $12.9 million on its first weekend in theaters in the United States and Canada, 40% less than expected. This made it the third-highest-earning film that weekend, behind Disney's Beverly Hills Chihuahua and Sony/Screen Gems's Quarantine. A Warner Bros. executive said he was disappointed with the film's opening, and attributed it to its controversial storyline. In a fourteen-week theatrical run in the United States and Canada, the film earned $39 million.

Outside North America, it fared reasonably well. In Australia, it was the highest-earning film in its opening weekend of October 9–12, 2008, with $2,104,319, ahead of Pixar Animation's WALL-E, which fell to second place, while Beverly Hills Chihuahua held third. In the United Kingdom, the film's earnings were the second-highest behind Quantum of Solace during November 21–23, its opening weekend. It earned £991,939 from 393 screens.

Overall, while the film grossed $40 million at the North American box office, it has grossed $115,097,286 worldwide. Analysts attribute this to the film's Middle East setting and exploration of terrorism. Brandon Gray pointed out that people read these themes in the news media already, and there is a perception that Hollywood films are biased.

Golshifteh Farahani's performance in the film resulted in trouble for Farahani from the Iranian government, being accused of being shown without a hijab.

=== Critical response ===
Body of Lies received mixed reviews from critics. On Rotten Tomatoes, the film has a rating of 55%, based on 216 reviews, with an average rating of 5.90/10. The critical consensus reads, "Body of Lies relies too heavily on the performances of DiCaprio and Crowe to lift it above a conventional espionage thriller." On Metacritic, the film has a score of 57 out of 100, based on 37 critics, indicating "mixed or average" reviews. Audiences polled by CinemaScore gave the film an average grade of "B-" on a scale of A+ to F.

Roger Ebert, writing in the Chicago Sun-Times, awarded the film three stars out of four. He praised the "convincing" acting and "realistic locations and terse dialogue", but questioned the verisimilitude of the story and concluded, "Body of Lies contains enough you can believe, or almost believe, that you wish so much of it weren't sensationally implausible".

Kenneth Turan reached the same conclusion in the Los Angeles Times: "The skill of top-flight director Ridley Scott and his veteran production team, not to mention the ability of stars Leonardo DiCaprio and Russell Crowe, ensure that this story of spies and terrorism in the Middle East is always crisp and watchable." He added, "But as the film's episodic story gradually reveals itself, it ends up too unconvincing and conventional to consistently hold our attention."

Lisa Kennedy in The Denver Post summarized, "Body of Lies is an A-list project with B-game results. The movie might be set in the Age of Jihad. But the rules of trust and mistrust are wholly familiar."

Critics observed the film's adherence to conventions of the spy thriller genre; Ebert called it "a James Bond plot", and David Denby in The New Yorker pointed out the "usual tropes of the genre—surveillance shots from drones, S.U.V.s tearing across the desert, explosions, scenes of torture", but praised Scott's superior management of space and timing. While Todd McCarthy in Variety praised the initial set-up and conceit of the plot device, he criticized the formulaic approach leading to a "cornball denouement".

A. O. Scott in The New York Times wrote that director Scott's "professionalism is, as ever, present in every frame and scene, but this time it seems singularly untethered from anything like zeal, conviction or even curiosity". He added that he would have preferred the psychological tensions linking the three leading men to be developed further.

Joe Neumaier wrote in the New York Daily News that the film "aims to be up-to-the-moment – yet feels same-old, same-old".

Lisa Kennedy called the love story between DiCaprio and Farahani contrived, saying that while DiCaprio seemed more at home in those scenes, it made the film seem "foolish". Ebert thought the cultural context of their relationship was well established, but it essentially existed as a convenience of the plot to set up the unlikely conclusion.

Mark Strong's performance was mentioned by several critics, with Scott calling it "a marvel of exotic suavity and cool insinuation", while Ebert "particularly admired" his aura of suave control.

== See also ==
- Leonardo DiCaprio filmography
- Russell Crowe filmography
- List of films featuring drones
- Brownface
- Sa'ad Khair
