= Fred H. Nomme =

Norwegian diplomat

Fred Harald Nomme (born 21 February 1946) is a Norwegian diplomat.

He was born in Sandefjord, and studied business administration at the University of Minnesota and San Francisco State College. He worked at the University of Bergen, University of Oslo, Norwegian Shipowners' Association and as pivate secretary to Her Royal Highness the Crown Princess of Norway (currently Queen Sonja). From 1991 to 1994 he was a section leader in the Lillehammer Olympic Organising Committee and Chief of Protocol at the Olympic Winter Games at Lillehammer in 1994.

He had positions as diplomat in Norwegian embassies in Saudi Arabia, Morocco, France and the United States. He was appointed as Norway's ambassador to Nigeria in 1995 and was also ambassador to Benin, Togo, Ghana and Cameroon. In November 1995 he was recalled from Nigeria, following the execution of Ken Saro-Wiwa and the Ogoni Nine. He returned to Nigeria in 1996. In September 1998 he was appointed as ambassador to Malaysia. In 1996 he was appointed ambassador to Brunei as well. He was Norway´s consul general in Shanghai from 2005 to 2011, and was Norway's ambassador to Morocco from 2011 to 2014. He retired from the Norwegian Foreign Service in 2014.

Nomme is Commander of the Royal Norwegian Order of Merit, awarded in 2000.
