= Adi Ignatius =

American journalist (born 1958)

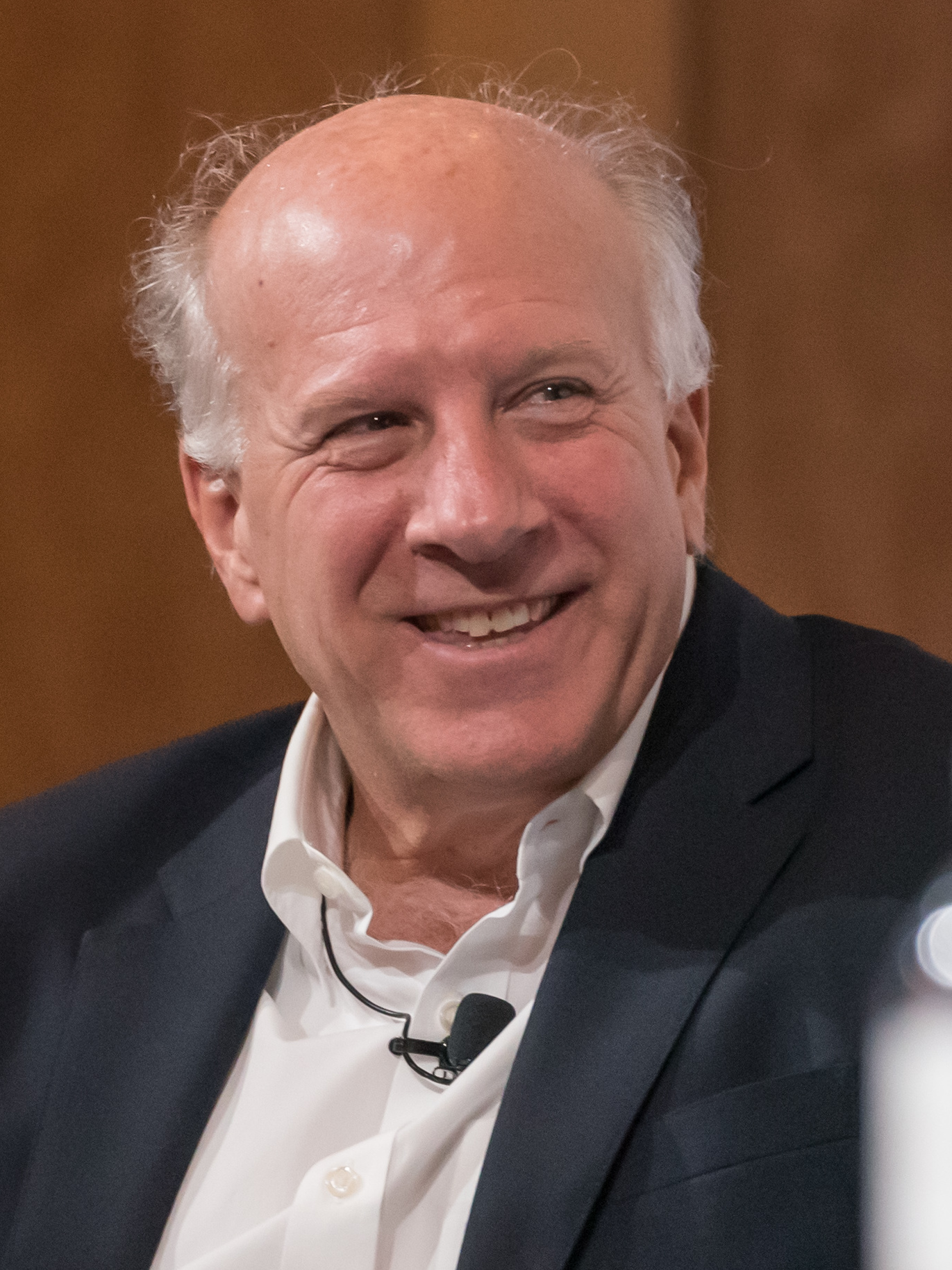
- Ignatius in 2019
- Born: 1958 (age 67–68); Burbank, California, U.S.
- Education: Haverford College (BA)
- Occupation: Journalist
- Spouse: Dorinda Elliott (m. 1985)
- Children: 3

Adi Ignatius (born 1958) is an American journalist. He previously served as the editor-in-chief of Harvard Business Review. He joined the magazine in January 2009.

== Early life and education ==
Ignatius was born in Burbank, California, to Paul Ignatius, a United States Secretary of the Navy from 1967 to 1969, and Nancy Ignatius. His elder brother, David Ignatius, became an editor and columnist for The Washington Post.

After graduating from St. Albans School, Igantius received a bachelor's degree in history in 1981 from Haverford College. He was awarded a Zuckerman Fellowship at Columbia University’s School of International and Public Affairs in 1990.

== Career ==
Ignatius started his career at the Wall Street Journal, eventually serving as the newspaper's bureau chief in Beijing and later in Moscow. He later served as managing editor of the Central European Economic Review and business editor of the Far Eastern Economic Review, publications owned by Dow Jones.

In 1996, Ignatius joined Time, as Deputy Editor of Time Asia in 1996, based in Hong Kong, and was named Editor of that edition in 2000. He became the magazine's executive editor starting in 2002, responsible for the magazine's business and international coverage. He wrote frequently for the magazine, including cover stories on Google and the 2007 Person of the Year profile of Russian leader Vladimir Putin. From 2007 to 2008, Ignatius served as Time's deputy managing editor, where he was responsible for many of its special editions, including the Person of the Year and Time 100 franchises.

In 2009, Ignatius was appointed as the editor-in-chief of Harvard Business Review. He stepped down in 2025, becoming the publication's editor-at-large.

He is a member of the Council on Foreign Relations and the Asia Society and sits on the advisory board of the journalism school at SUNY. He currently serves as the Board President of Historic Stonington, an organization dedicated to preserving and sharing the history of Stonington, Connecticut.

== Personal life ==
In 1985, Ignatius married Dorinda Elliott. They have three sons.

== Books ==
Ignatius is coeditor, of the book Prisoner of the State: The Secret Journal of Premier Zhao Ziyang. The book is based on audiotapes that Zhao Ziyang, the former Premier of the State Council of the People's Republic of China, recorded at home during 1999 and 2000.

In 2008, Ignatius was editor of the book President Obama: The Path to the White House, which was a New York Times Bestseller.
