= Ingebjørg Støfring =

Norwegian diplomat

Norwegian Ambassador to Zimbabwe
- In office 2010–2013

Norwegian Ambassador to Bangladesh
- In office 2006–2010

Personal details
- Born: 16 March 1945 (age 81)
- Education: University of Oslo; University of East Anglia
- Profession: Diplomat

Ingebjørg Støfring (born 16 March 1945) is a Norwegian diplomat who served as Norwegian Ambassador to Bangladesh and Zimbabwe.

She studied sociology at the University of Oslo, and graduated from the University of East Anglia with an MA in International Development in 1987. She was made a Knight 1st Classe of the Royal Norwegian Order of Merit in 2007, and promoted to Commander of the same order in 2011.
