= Arild Retvedt Øyen =

Norwegian veterinarian and diplomat

Arild Retvedt Øyen (born 19 March 1946) is a Norwegian veterinarian and diplomat. His most prominent positions include those of director of the World Food Programme in Madagascar and Norway's ambassador to nine African countries.

== Career ==
Øyen was born in Ski, finished his secondary education in 1965 and graduated from the Norwegian School of Veterinary Science with the cand.med.vet. degree in 1973. He was acting municipal veterinarian in Hitra Municipality, Frøya Municipality and Selbu Municipality from 1973 to 1974, only in Selbu from 1974 to 1975 and later district veterinarian based in Hammerfest from 1977 to 1978. He was involved in a project in Madagascar from 1978 to 1985; from 1981 this project had a connection to the Norwegian Agency for Development Cooperation. From 1986 to 1988 he was the director of the World Food Programme in Madagascar.

Øyen was then an inspector for the Norwegian Ministry of Agriculture from 1988 to 1989, and adviser in the Norwegian Agency for Development Cooperation from 1990 to 1991. He later worked as counsellor at the Norwegian embassy in Namibia, then in Tanzania, then in Uganda. In 1997 he became the Norwegian ambassador to Uganda; from 1998 he also had responsibility for the neighboring countries Burundi and Rwanda. In 2002 he became the Norwegian ambassador to Angola, from 2003 also with responsibility for Democratic Republic of the Congo and Republic of Congo, from 2004 also in São Tomé and Príncipe, and from 2005 in Gabon. He later returned to Norway, but in 2009 he was dispatched to the Congo to conciliate in the criminal case of Joshua French and Tjostolv Moland. In 2010 he became ambassador to Algeria.

He has been decorated with an Order by the Malagasy government, and in 1999 he became a Commander of the Royal Norwegian Order of Merit. He was later decorated with the Royal Norwegian Order of St. Olav.
