= Logistics Management Institute =

Company in Virginia, United States

LMI
- Type: Private company
- Industry: Technology Solutions
- Founded: October 3, 1961; 64 years ago
- Headquarters: Tysons Corner, Virginia, United States
- Key people: Josh Wilson (CEO)
- Owner: Declaration Partners, Capitol Meridian Partners, and 22C Capital
- Website: lmisolutions.com

LMI (formerly Logistics Management Institute) is a technology solutions company with focus on the defense sector. Established in 1961, LMI is headquartered in Tysons, Virginia, near McLean, in the Greater Washington, D.C. area, with satellite offices located throughout the United States. It was designated by the United States government as a federally funded research and development center during the 1970-2010s returning to a privately held company in 2022.

== History ==
In September, 1961, Secretary of Defense Robert McNamara sent a memorandum to President John F. Kennedy, recommending the creation of an independent organization that could provide logistics management services and related research to the federal government. With Kennedy's support, the Logistics Management Institute (LMI) was founded three weeks later on October 3, 1961. Initially based out of an office in The Pentagon; LMI consisted of fewer than a dozen employees at its formation.

During the following year, LMI grew considerably, more than doubling its staff and relocating to a new office. Despite congressional interest in de-funding the organization during the early 1970s, LMI managed to remain solvent by expanding its market to include other government agencies, though it remained primarily focused on the servicing the Department of Defense.

Steady growth continued throughout the late 1970s and into the following decade. In 1984, LMI moved its headquarters to Bethesda, Maryland. The following year, Deputy Secretary of Defense William Howard Taft IV designated LMI as a federally funded research and development center (FFRDC), precluding it from competing with profit-seeking firms. Significant growth, coupled with funding caps imposed by Congress on FFRDCs in the 1990s, proved burdensome, however, and in 1998 LMI was returned to its initial status as a not-for-profit.

In 2013, developers broke ground for Tysons Overlook, an 11-story office complex in Tysons, Virginia, adjacent to the headquarters of Gannett/USA Today. As of 2014, LMI occupies six floors within the facility, which houses its current headquarters.

In 2022, LMI sold its for-profit subsidiary to a consortium of investment firms. The remaining nonprofit entity was re-brand as NobleReach Foundation™.

== Acquisitions ==
In 2004, LMI acquired The Bureaucrat, Inc., a non-profit organization that publishes The Public Manager, a quarterly journal covering public management issues, and, the following year, formed the LMI Research Institute, which conducts research for the organization, both internally and through academic partnerships with several research universities in the United States. In 2008, LMI purchased Jasmah Consulting, which was reorganized as the Intelligence Programs group within the organization's existing infrastructure.

In 2019, LMI acquired two companies, The Tauri Group, a government contracting firm confronting national and homeland security challenges, and Clockwork Solutions, a firm based in Austin that offers a predictive analytics software platform. LMI established a wholly owned subsidiary, LMI Consulting, in April 2020. In 2021, LMI acquired Suntiva, a digitally based business transformation company focused on public health and defense and headquartered in Falls Church, VA.

In 2022, LMI acquired Synaptech, which creates digital engineering, modeling, and simulation software for the national security and space industries. In 2024, LMI acquired JJR Solutions, a business rooted in military service that is working to improve the nation’s health and security through user experience and technology solutions.

== See also ==
- Total Quality Logistics
