= Body of Lies (novel) =

2007 novel by David Ignatius

- First edition
- Author: David Ignatius
- Language: English
- Genre: Spy thriller
- Publisher: W. W. Norton & Company
- Publication date: April 16, 2007
- Publication place: United States
- Media type: Print (hardback)
- Pages: 320 pp
- ISBN: 0-393-06503-0
- OCLC: 77486002
- Dewey Decimal: 813/.54 22
- LC Class: PS3559.G54 B63 2007

Body of Lies is an American spy thriller novel by David Ignatius, a columnist for The Washington Post. It was published by W. W. Norton in 2007. It was originally titled Penetration but was renamed after Warner Bros. bought the rights in 2006. It was made into a film of the same name in 2008.

== Premise ==
Roger Ferris is a CIA officer who sets a trap for a terrorist responsible for car bombings throughout Europe.

Referencing the real (and highly successful) Operation Mincemeat, "Ferris's plan is inspired by a masterpiece of British intelligence during World War II: He prepares a body of lies, literally the corpse of an imaginary CIA officer who appears to have accomplished the impossible by recruiting an agent within the enemy's ranks.

== Reception ==
The Christian Science Monitor described the novel as "happily original" for its genre, applauding the espionage detail of America's intelligence missions. The newspaper however criticized the underdevelopment of female characters in the novel and the "painful" romantic scenes.

Adrian McKinty of The Washington Post described the character of Roger Ferris as "idealistic, passionate, wholly believable [and that] his adventures make for a story that is fast-paced and psychologically deep." McKinty highlights Ignatius's sensitive treatment of the Arab world.

== Film adaptation ==
Body of Lies is American feature film adaptation of the novel Body of Lies by David Ignatius about a CIA operative who goes to Jordan to track a high-ranking terrorist. The film is directed by Ridley Scott, written by William Monahan, and stars Leonardo DiCaprio, Russell Crowe and Mark Strong. Production took place in Washington D.C., Europe, Morocco and the Middle East. Body of Lies was released in the United States on October 10, 2008.
