= David Ignatius =

American journalist and novelist (born 1950)

- Ignatius at the Politics and Prose bookstore in Washington, D.C. (2026)
- Born: David Reynolds Ignatius; May 26, 1950 (age 76); Cambridge, Massachusetts, U.S.
- Education: Harvard University; King's College, Cambridge
- Occupations: Journalist; novelist
- Spouse: Eve Thornberg
- Children: 3
- Parent(s): Paul Ignatius (father); Nancy Weiser Sharpless (mother)
- Relatives: Adi Ignatius (brother)
- Writing career
- Genres: Suspense, espionage fiction, thriller
- Notable works: Body of Lies, Agents of Innocence, The Increment
- Website: davidignatius.com

David Reynolds Ignatius (born May 26, 1950) is an American journalist and novelist. He is an associate editor and columnist for The Washington Post. He has written eleven novels, including Body of Lies, which director Ridley Scott adapted into a film. He is a former adjunct lecturer at the Kennedy School of Government at Harvard University and was a Senior Fellow to the Future of Diplomacy Program from 2017 to 2022.

== Early life and education ==
Ignatius was born in Cambridge, Massachusetts, to Nancy Sharpless (née Weiser) and Paul Robert Ignatius, a former Secretary of the Navy (1967–69), president of The Washington Post, and former president of the Air Transport Association. He is of Armenian descent on his father's side, with ancestors from Harput, Elazığ, Turkey; his mother, a descendant of Puritan minister Cotton Mather, is of German and English descent.

Ignatius was raised in Washington, D.C., where he attended St. Albans School. He then attended Harvard College, where he studied political theory and graduated magna cum laude in 1972. While at Harvard he worked for The Harvard Crimson.

Ignatius was awarded a Frank Knox Fellowship from Harvard University and studied at King's College, Cambridge, where he received a diploma in economics.

== Career ==
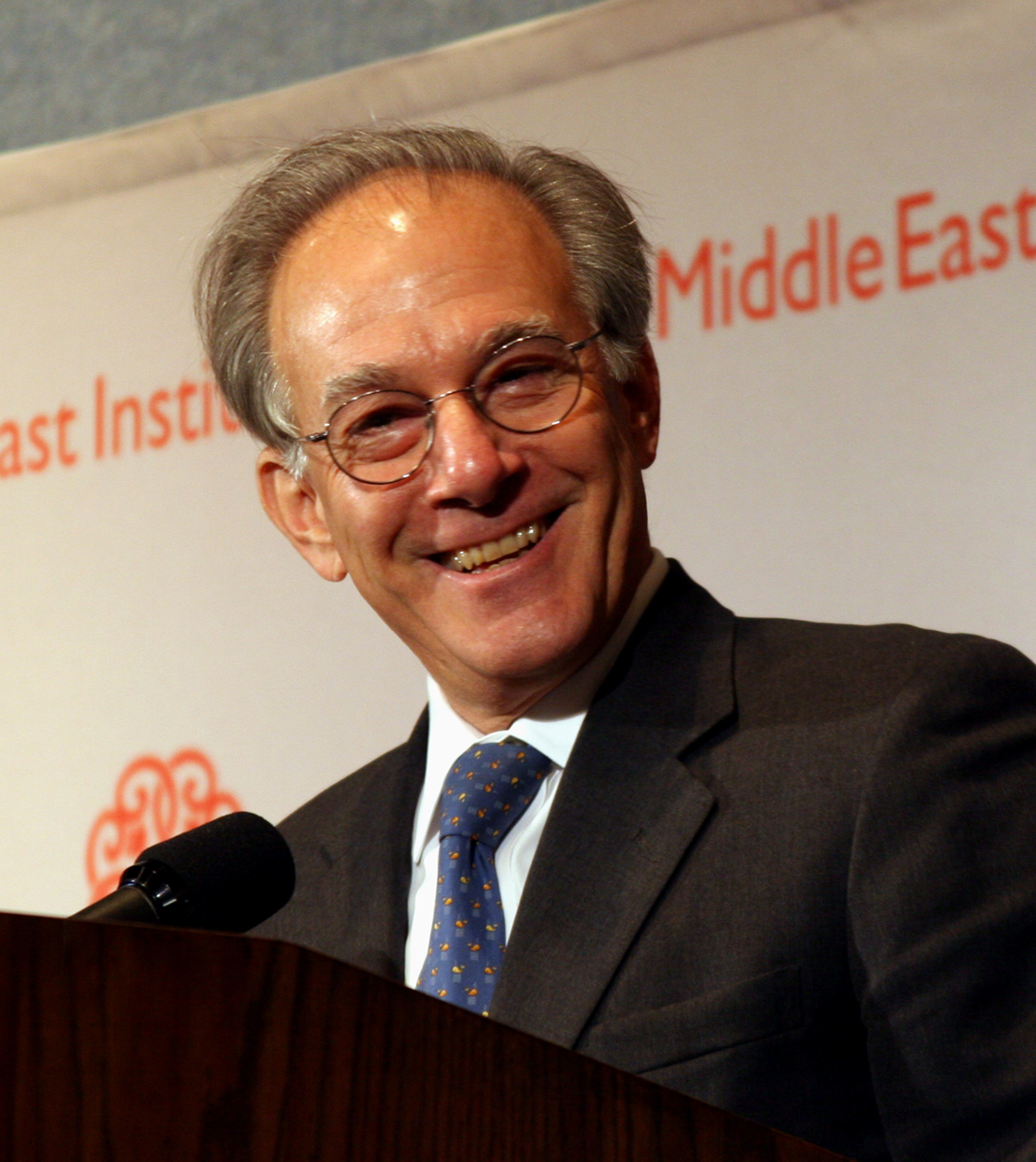
Ignatius in 2007

=== Journalism ===
After completing his education, Ignatius was an editor at the Washington Monthly before moving to The Wall Street Journal, where he spent ten years as a reporter. At the Journal, Ignatius first covered the steel industry in Pittsburgh. He then moved to Washington, where he covered the Justice Department, the CIA, and the Senate. Ignatius was the Journal's Middle East correspondent from 1980 through 1983, during which time he covered the wars in Lebanon and Iraq. He returned to Washington in 1984, becoming chief diplomatic correspondent. In 1985, he received the Edward Weintal Prize for diplomatic reporting.

In 1986, Ignatius left the Journal for The Washington Post. From 1986 to 1990, he was the editor of the "Outlook" section. From 1990 to 1992, he was foreign editor. From 1993 to 1999, he served as assistant managing editor in charge of business news. In 1999, he began writing a twice-weekly column on global politics, economics and international affairs.

In 2000, he became the executive editor of the International Herald Tribune in Paris. He returned to the Post in 2002 when the Post sold its interest in the Herald Tribune. Ignatius continued to write his column once a week during his tenure at the Herald Tribune, resuming twice-weekly columns after his return to the Post. His column is syndicated worldwide by The Washington Post Writers Group. The column won the 2000 Gerald Loeb Award for Commentary. In writing his column, Ignatius has travelled to the Middle East and interviewed Syrian president Bashar al-Assad and Hassan Nasrallah, the head of the Lebanese military organization Hezbollah.

Ignatius's writing has also appeared in the The New York Times Magazine, The Atlantic, Foreign Affairs, Foreign Policy, The New Republic, Talk, and The Washington Monthly.

Ignatius's coverage of the CIA has been criticized as being deferential and overly positive. Melvin A. Goodman, a 42-year CIA veteran, Johns Hopkins University professor, and senior fellow at the Center for International Policy, has called Ignatius "the mainstream media's apologist for the Central Intelligence Agency", citing as examples Ignatius's criticism of the Obama administration for investigating the CIA's role in the use of torture in interrogations during the Iraq War and his charitable defense of the agency's motivations for outsourcing such activities to private contractors. Journalist Glenn Greenwald has leveled similar criticism against Ignatius.

On March 12, 2014, he wrote a two-page descriptive opinion on Vladimir Putin's strengths and weaknesses that was published in the Journal and Courier soon after.

In September 2023, Ignatius wrote a column which appeared in The Washington Post, arguing that President Joe Biden and Vice President Kamala Harris should not run for re-election, despite what Ignatius described as Biden's numerous successes in his time in the Oval Office. The op-ed received widespread recognition from several news publications across the political spectrum.

=== Novels ===
In addition to being a journalist, Ignatius has written eleven novels in the suspense/spy genre that draw on his experience and interest in foreign affairs and his knowledge of intelligence operations. His first novel, Agents of Innocence, was at one point described by the CIA on its website as "a novel but not fiction".

His 2007 novel, Body of Lies, was adapted into a film by director Ridley Scott. It starred Leonardo DiCaprio and Russell Crowe. Disney and producer Jerry Bruckheimer have acquired the rights to Ignatius's seventh novel, The Increment.

His 2014 novel, The Director, was acquired by Columbia Pictures with Paul Greengrass attached to direct and write the screenplay.

The Quantum Spy, published in 2017, is an espionage thriller about the race between the United States and China to build the world's first hyper-fast quantum computer. His book, The Paladin: A Spy Novel, was published in 2020.

=== Opera ===
In May 2015, MSNBC's Morning Joe announced that Ignatius would be teaming up with composer Mohammed Fairouz to create a political opera titled The New Prince, based on the teachings of Niccolò Machiavelli. The opera was commissioned by the Dutch National Opera. Speaking with The Washington Post, Ignatius described the broad themes of the opera in terms of three chapters: "The first chapter is about revolution and disorder. Revolutions, like children, are lovable when young, and they become much less lovable as they age. The second lesson Machiavelli tells us is about sexual obsession, among leaders. And then the final chapter is basically the story of Dick Cheney [and] bin Laden, the way in which those two ideas of what we're obliged to do as leaders converged in such a destructive way."

=== Other ===
In 2006, Ignatius wrote a foreword to the American edition of Moazzam Begg's Enemy Combatant, a book about the author's experiences as a detainee at the Guantánamo Bay detention camp. In 2008, Zbigniew Brzezinski, Brent Scowcroft, and Ignatius published America and the World: Conversations on the Future of American Foreign Policy, a book that collected conversations, moderated by Ignatius, between Brzezinski and Scowcroft. Michiko Kakutani of The New York Times named it one of the ten best books of 2008.

Ignatius has been trustee of the German Marshall Fund since 2000. He has been a member of the Council on Foreign Relations since 1984. From 1984 to 1990, he was a member of the governing board of St. Albans School.

In 2011, Ignatius held a contest for The Washington Post readers to write a spy novel. Ignatius wrote the first chapter and challenged fans to continue the story. Over eight weeks, readers sent in their versions of what befalls CIA agents Alex Kassem and Sarah Mancini and voted for their favorite entries. Ignatius chose the winning entry for each round, resulting in a six-chapter Web serial. Winners of the subsequent chapters included Chapter 2, "Sweets for the Sweet", by Colin Flaherty; Chapter 3, "Abu Talib", by Jill Borak; Chapter 4, "Go Hard or Go Home", by Vineet Daga; Chapter 5, "Inside Out", by Colin Flaherty; and Chapter 6, "Onward!", by Gina 'Miel' Ard.

In early 2012, Ignatius served as an adjunct lecturer at the John F. Kennedy School of Government at Harvard University, teaching an international affairs course titled Understanding the Arab Spring from the Ground Up: Events in the Middle East, their Roots and Consequences for the United States. He served as a senior fellow at the Future of Diplomacy Program at Harvard University from 2017 to 2022.

In 2018, he won a George Polk Award for his coverage of the Jamal Khashoggi murder.

== Political views ==
Ignatius supported the 2003 invasion of Iraq. He later expressed regret, saying "I wish I had some of those columns back". On a number of occasions, Ignatius criticized the CIA and the U.S. government's approach on intelligence. He was also critical of the Bush administration's use, during the war on terror, of what the administration called "enhanced interrogation techniques", practices regarded by some as amounting to illegal torture of suspects.

On March 26, 2014, Ignatius wrote a piece in The Washington Post on the then-crisis in Ukraine and how the world would deal with Putin's actions. Ignatius's theory of history is that it is a chaos, and that "good" things are not preordained, "decisive turns in history can result from ruthless political leaders, from weak or confused adversaries, or sometimes just from historical accident. Might doesn't make right, but it does create 'facts on the ground' that are hard to reverse." His piece mentioned four-star USAF general Philip M. Breedlove, the current NATO Supreme Allied Commander Europe, and Ukrainian foreign minister Andriy Deshchytsya. Putin, says Ignatius, "leads what by most political and economic indicators is a weak nation—a declining power, not a rising one." He placed great hope in Angela Merkel.

== 2009 Davos incident ==
At the 2009 World Economic Forum in Davos, Switzerland, Ignatius moderated a discussion including Turkish prime minister Recep Tayyip Erdoğan, Israeli president Shimon Peres, UN secretary-general Ban Ki-moon, and Arab League secretary-general Amr Moussa. As the December 2008–January 2009 conflict in Gaza was still fresh in memory, the tone of the discussion was lively. Ignatius gave Erdoğan 12 minutes to speak and gave the Israeli president 25 minutes to respond. Erdoğan objected to Peres's tone and raised his voice during the Israeli president's impassioned defense of his nation's actions. Ignatius gave Erdoğan a minute to respond (Erdoğan repeatedly insisted "One minute", in English), and when Erdoğan went over his allocated minute, Ignatius repeatedly cut the Turkish prime minister off, telling him and the audience that they were out of time and that they had to adjourn to a dinner. Erdoğan seemed visibly frustrated as he said confrontationally to the Israeli president, "When it comes to killing, you know well how to kill." Ignatius put his arm on Erdoğan's shoulder and continued to tell him that his time was up. Erdoğan then gathered his papers and walked out, saying, "I do not think I will be coming back to Davos after this because you do not let me speak."

Writing about the incident later, Ignatius said that he found himself "in the middle of a fight where there was no longer a middle. [...] Because the Israel–Palestinian conflict provokes such heated emotions on both sides of the debate", Ignatius concluded, "it was impossible for anyone to be seen as an impartial mediator." Ignatius wrote that his experience elucidated a larger truth about failure of the United States' attempt to serve as an impartial mediator in the Israeli–Palestinian conflict. "American leaders must give up the notion that they can transform the Middle East and its culture through military force", he wrote, and instead "get out of the elusive middle, step across the threshold of anger, and sit down and talk" with the Middle Eastern leaders.

== Personal life ==
Ignatius married Dr. Eve Thornberg in 1980. The couple has three daughters. Ignatius and his wife live in the Cleveland Park neighborhood of Washington, DC. His brother, Adi Ignatius, is editor-in-chief of Harvard Business Review.

== Works ==
=== Novels ===
- Agents of Innocence. W. W. Norton & Company. 1987. ISBN 0-393-02486-5.
- Siro. Farrar, Straus and Giroux. 1991. ISBN 0-374-26506-2.
- The Bank of Fear. Avon Books. 1995. ISBN 0-380-72280-1.
- A Firing Offense. Random House. 1997. ISBN 0-517-36839-0.
- The Sun King. Random House. 2000. ISBN 0-8129-9243-1.
- Body of Lies. W. W. Norton & Company. 2007. ISBN 978-0-393-33158-5.
- The Increment. W. W. Norton & Company. 2009. ISBN 978-0-393-33831-7.
- Bloodmoney. W. W. Norton & Company. 2011. ISBN 978-0-393-34179-9.
- The Director. W. W. Norton & Company. 2014. ISBN 978-0-393-07814-5.
- The Quantum Spy. W. W. Norton & Company. 2017. ISBN 978-0-393-25415-0.
- The Paladin. W. W. Norton & Company. 2020. ISBN 978-0-393-25417-4.
- Phantom Orbit: A Thriller. W. W. Norton & Company. 2024. ISBN 978-1324050919.

=== Non-fiction ===
- America and the World: Conversations on the Future of American Foreign Policy. Basic Books; First Trade Paper Edition. 2009. ISBN 978-0-465-01801-7.
