= Finn Kristen Fostervoll =

Norwegian diplomat

- Born: 26 December 1939

Finn Kristen Fostervoll (born 26 December 1939) is a Norwegian diplomat.

He was a journalist from 1962 to 1969, and later studied political science, with his MA degree taken at Carleton University in 1972. He started working for the Norwegian Ministry of Foreign Affairs in 1972, and was promoted to assistant secretary in 1976, a position he held until 1983. He later spent much time working with nuclear disarmament and non-proliferation, and had diplomatic assignments in Germany, Portugal and at NATO in Brussels. From 1997 he served as the Norwegian ambassador to Turkey and Greece, and from 2005 to Cyprus as well. He retired in 2006.

In 1999 he was decorated as a Knight of the Royal Norwegian Order of Merit. He resides in Oslo.
