= Ismael Babouk =

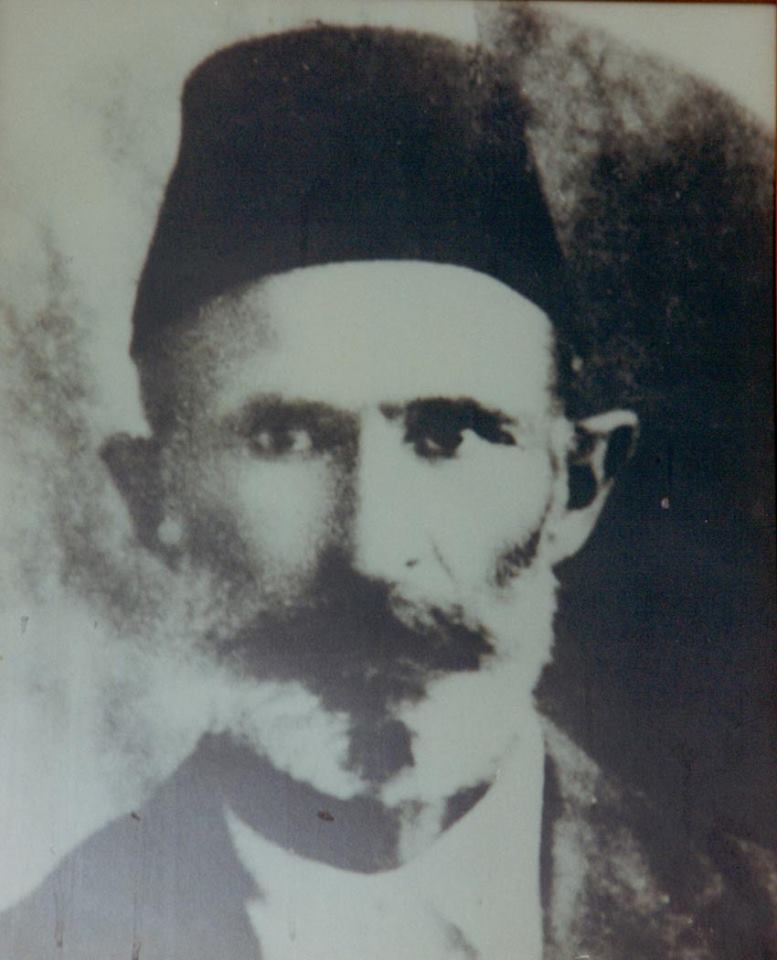

1st Mayor of Amman
- In office 1 January 1909 – 1 January 1911
- Preceded by: Office established
- Succeeded by: Ahmad Khatib

Personal details
- Born: 1841 Circassia
- Died: 1920 (aged 78–79) Amman, Kingdom of Syria

Ismael Babouk (Adyghe: Бабук Исмаил, romanized: Babuk İsmail; Arabic: إسماعيل بابوق; 1841–1920) was a Circassian aristocrat who established the first mayoral council and held office as the first Mayor of Amman between 1909 and 1911.

== Early life ==
Ismael Babouk was part of the first generation of Kabardian Circassians that resettled in Amman's ancient Roman ruins after being forced to leave from their homeland Circassia. The resettlement was the result of the Russo-Circassian War that took place in historical Circassia between 1763 and 1864, which roughly encompassed the major part of the North Caucasus and the northeast shore of the Black Sea.

Ismael Babouk, after whom one of Amman's downtown streets was named, resided with siblings Kamel Babouk, Maher Babouk and Sawrat-Khan Babouk in 1885 on the Italian Hospital Street.

== Career ==
=== Career in agriculture & livestock trading ===
Ismael Babouk started his career in agriculture and raw agricultural land upon arriving in Jordan. He later expanded his work to include livestock trading between Syria, Palestine and Lebanon.

=== Career in politics ===
Ismael Babouk's career in politics started when he established Amman's first mayoral council that helped transform the city from a village to a town.

Being one of the elders of his people, and being fluent in reading and writing Arabic, Turkish, and Circassian helped get him elected by the residents of the city of Amman as Mayor in 1909 where he held office till 1911.

His mayoral election helped increase the interaction between Amman and As Salt.
