= Didrik Tønseth (diplomat) =

Norwegian diplomat and lawyer

Didrik Tønseth (born 8 October 1944) is a Norwegian diplomat and lawyer. He served as the Ambassador of the Kingdom of Norway to South Korea from 2006 to 2011, and to North Korea from 2007 to 2011. He was succeeded by Torbjørn Holthe in 2011. He became a Knight of the Royal Norwegian Order of Merit in 2007.

He holds a cand.jur. degree from the University of Oslo and an LL.M. in European law from the College of Europe.
