= Yousef Shawarbeh =

Mayor of Amman, Jordan

Mayor of Amman
- In office 21 August 2017 – 11 August 2026
- Preceded by: Aqel Biltaji

Deputy Mayor of Amman
- In office 2013–2016

Minister of Political Development and Parliamentary Affairs
- In office 2016–2016

Chairman of Amman Municipal Committee
- In office March 2017 – 21 August 2017

Yousef Shawarbeh (born 1968) is a Jordanian politician, who served as the 40th mayor of Amman, Jordan between 2017 and 2026.

== Early life and education ==
Shawarbeh holds a master's degree in law.

== Career ==
Shawarbeh was a member of the Greater Amman Municipality (GAM) and headed Tareq neighbourhood's local committee. He was appointed deputy mayor of the GAM in September 2013 and mayor Amman in August 2017. In March 2022, the Cabinet renewed his mayoral mandate.

In 2023, United Nations Secretary-General António Guterres appointed Shawarbeh to his Advisory Group on Local and Regional Governments, co-chaired by Pilar Cancela Rodríguez and Fatimatou Abdel Malick.
