= 2026 Iran war =

Ongoing armed conflict in West Asia

- Part of the Middle Eastern crisis
- Locations struck by: United States, Israel, and allies; Iran, Hezbollah, Houthis, and PMF
Date	28 February 2026 – present (8 months, 3 weeks and 4 days)
Location	West Asia (Note: Primarily the Persian Gulf, South Arabia and the Levant, as well as Cyprus (Akrotiri and Dhekelia), Egypt (Damietta) and the South Caucasus (Nakhchivan).)
Status	Ongoing: Strait of Hormuz crisis; Resumption of the Hezbollah-Israel conflict; US-led economic isolation campaign against Iran; Escalation of the Yemeni civil war and Bab al-Mandab Strait crisis

Belligerents
United States; Israel (Note: Israel had initially conducted bombings against Iran and its allies since the beginning of the war but later refrained from attacks on Iran since July.); Saudi Arabia (Note: On 29 July 2026, Saudi Arabia publicly participated in joint strikes with the United States against Iran-backed Iraqi militias. Earlier, according to Reuters, citing Western and Iranian officials, the Saudi Air Force launched numerous unpublicized "tit-for-tat" strikes on Iranian soil in late March 2026, in retaliation for Iranian attacks on Saudi Arabia. The New York Times, citing US officials, corroborated reports of Saudi strikes on Iran. Reuters also reported that the Saudi Air Force struck Iran-backed Iraqi militias near the Iraqi–Saudi border around the time of the 7 April ceasefire.); United Arab Emirates (Note: According to The Wall Street Journal and Bloomberg, citing "people familiar with the matter", and The New York Times, citing current and former US officials, the UAE discreetly carried out retaliatory attacks against Iran, including a strike on an oil refinery at Lavan Island on 8 April.); Kuwait (Note: According to The Wall Street Journal, Kuwait launched attacks on Iran-backed Iraqi militias from its own territory. Iraqi officials reported at least two rocket attacks from Kuwaiti territory in April; according to Reuters, it was unclear whether they were launched by the Kuwaiti Armed Forces or the US military. On 1 May, Kuwait said its soldiers exchanged fire with six members of Iran's Islamic Revolutionary Guards Corps, and arrested four, during an Iranian raid on Bubiyan Island. In July, The Wall Street Journal reported that Kuwait launched airstrikes inside Iran. Kuwait denied the reports and said it had not taken part in any military operations against Iran and had not allowed the use of its territory to launch offensive operations against any neighbouring country.); Bahrain (Note: According to The Wall Street Journal, Bahrain launched airstrikes inside Iran in July 2026.); Yemen (PLC) (Note: See 2026 Sanaa airport strike and 2026 Yemen offensives.); Iranian separatist groups; CPFIK (Note: For further information, see 2026 Kurdish–Iranian crisis and Western Iran clashes (2026–present).); People's Fighters Front (Note: For further information, see Insurgency in Sistan and Balochistan and Sistan and Balochistan clashes (2026–present).)	Iran; Axis of Resistance; Houthis (Note: Since 28 March; for further information, see Houthis in the 2026 Iran war.); Hezbollah (Note: Since 2 March; for further information, see 2026 Lebanon war.); Popular Mobilization Forces (Note: For further information, see 2026 United States–Israeli strikes on Iraq.); Islamic Resistance in Iraq

Commanders and leaders
Donald Trump; Pete Hegseth; Dan Caine; Brad Cooper; Marco Rubio; Benjamin Netanyahu; Israel Katz; Eyal Zamir	Ali Khamenei X; Mojtaba Khamenei (WIA); Masoud Pezeshkian; Mohammad Bagher Ghalibaf; Ali Larijani X; Ahmad Vahidi; Amir Hatami

Units involved
- See order of battle

Casualties and losses
- For deaths and injuries, see casualties.; For naval losses, see this list.; For aviation losses, see this list.

Since 28 February 2026, the United States and Israel have been at war with Iran and its regional allies, following the Twelve-Day War in June 2025 and sporadic fighting during the Middle Eastern crisis sparked by the Gaza war, which began in 2023. Amid ongoing US–Iran negotiations regarding Iran's nuclear program, the war began when the US and Israel conducted hundreds of air strikes on targets across Iran, including strikes that assassinated Supreme Leader Ali Khamenei alongside several other Iranian officials. Iran responded by blocking trade through the Strait of Hormuz, resulting in an unprecedented global fuel crisis, high inflation and a surge in the cost of living worldwide.

American rationale for initiating the war included regime change, preventing Iran from obtaining a nuclear weapon, a response to the massacre of thousands of anti-government protesters in Iran, and taking Iran's oil and gas resources. Critics have rejected these justifications, stating that the attack initiated a war of aggression in violation of international law. Later US war goals focused on nuclear negotiations and reopening the Strait of Hormuz. Public opinion is opposed to the war in the United States and in many other countries, leading to widespread disapproval for Donald Trump and declining views of the US and Israel around the world.

The war was preceded in January–February 2026 by the largest US military buildup in the region since the 2003 invasion of Iraq. Following a decentralized strategy, Iran responded with missile and drone attacks against Israel and US military bases in the Middle East, attacked US allies in the Middle East and blocked the Strait of Hormuz, subsequently claiming sovereignty over it. Responding to strikes on their territory, the United Arab Emirates, Saudi Arabia, Kuwait, and Bahrain attacked Iran and skirmished with its Iraqi non-state allies. In March, fighting resumed between Hezbollah and Israel, and Israel began occupying southern Lebanon. After Khamenei's assassination, his son, Mojtaba Khamenei, was elected supreme leader of Iran.

The secretary-general of the United Nations and many countries condemned the US–Israeli strikes, while the United Nations Security Council passed a resolution also condemning Iran's retaliatory strikes on Gulf states. An initial two-week ceasefire beginning on 8 April came under strain when Israel launched massive airstrikes across Lebanon on the same day. Iran resumed its blockade, and after the failure of the Islamabad Talks on 12–13 April, the US imposed a naval blockade on Iran. On 21 April, the US announced an indefinite ceasefire, and on 17 June the US and Iran signed a memorandum to end the war, lifting the dual blockade. Tensions briefly escalated, but the US and Iran agreed on 28 June to resume the ceasefire. On 8 July, the ceasefire collapsed after Iran initiated attacks on commercial vessels in the Strait of Hormuz. In September, Iran's Houthi allies launched an offensive, escalating the Yemeni civil war and launching a wave of drone and missile attacks on Saudi Arabia in October.

The war has resulted in thousands of civilian and military casualties. The US Department of Defense estimated that the war has cost the US $48.3 billion in military spending as of November 2026. Economic impacts of the war include the largest ever supply disruption to the global oil market, volatility in financial markets, and disruptions to the natural gas, fertilizer, aviation, tourism and shipping industries. High fuel and energy prices have caused inflation, lower economic growth, higher borrowing costs and a global cost of living crisis, sparking protests in Europe and elsewhere. In late October, the Netanyahu government lost its governing majority in the 2026 Israeli legislative election. One week later, the Republican Party lost control of Congress in a landslide defeat that was widely attributed to the war's economic effects and unpopularity.

== Names ==
The initial strikes on Iran were codenamed Operation Epic Fury by the United States government, and Operation Roaring Lion (Note: Hebrew: מִבְצַע שְׁאָגַת הָאֲרִי, romanized: Mivtsá She'agát Ha'arí, lit. 'Operation Lion's Roar', pronounced [mivˈt͡sä ʃe̞.äˈɡätʰ hä.ʔäˈʁi]) by the Israeli government, in line with their codename of Operation Rising Lion for their strikes on Iran during the Twelve-Day War in June 2025. Iran codenamed its response Operation True Promise IV (Persian: عملیات وعده صادق ۴, romanized: Amaliyat-e Va'deh-ye Sadegh 4). (Note: Previously, Iran had launched I, II, and III on a more limited scale.)

American media outlets have generally referred to the conflict as the Iran war. The war has also been referred to by some outlets as the "Third Gulf War" (Gulf War III), following the Gulf War (1990–1991), and the Iraq War / Second Gulf War (Gulf War II) (2003–2011). (Note: Multiple sources:) Iranian state media has referred to the conflict as the "Third Imposed War", with the Iran–Iraq War (1980–1988) and the Twelve-Day War respectively as the "First" and "Second". Due to the war starting during the month of Ramadan, it has sometimes been called the "Ramadan War". (Note: Persian: جنگ رمضان, romanized: Jang-e Ramazān) (Note: Multiple sources:) The start of the war a month after the release of the Epstein files led to speculation that the war was launched to distract from Trump's association with Epstein. The nickname "Operation Epstein Fury" became popularized across many social media platforms. A Washington Post investigation later found that pro-Iran social media accounts also promoted the nickname. Additionally, netizens coined the term "Operation AIPAC Fury" to criticize Israel's lobbying influence over U.S. politicians, highlighting how heavily funded pro-Israel lobbying groups like the American Israel Public Affairs Committee (AIPAC) successfully pressured lawmakers to block the War Powers Resolution and secure ongoing support for the conflict.

== Background ==
=== Iran's relations with the United States and Israel ===
A US- and UK-backed coup d'état in 1953 deposed the democratically-elected Iranian prime minister Mohammad Mosaddegh due to his nationalization of the oil industry, strengthening the rule of Shah Mohammad Reza Pahlavi. Israel maintained ties with Iran as part of its alliance of the periphery strategy, as Pahlavi Iran was the second Muslim-majority country after Turkey to recognize Israel's sovereignty despite the Arab–Israeli conflict. Resentment of the Shah's autocratic rule led to the 1979 revolution in which Pahlavi was overthrown and replaced by an Islamic republic. Iran severed diplomatic ties with the US and Israel and held the American embassy staff hostage, releasing them after signing the 1981 Algiers Accords, in which, among other things, the US agreed not to intervene in Iranian affairs anymore.

During the Iran–Iraq War, the US supported Iraq. In 1988, a US warship struck an Iranian mine, and the US responded by attacking Iran's navy. A few months later, the US mistakenly shot down a civilian Iranian flight. Iran started a ballistic missile program to deter Iraqi missile attacks on Iranian cities during the 1980–88 Iran–Iraq War and to compensate for its lack of a modern air force due to sanctions.

Starting in 1985, Iran began engaging in proxy conflicts throughout the Middle East. These proxy groups became part of the informal 'Axis of Resistance' committed primarily to countering American, Israeli, Saudi, Emirati, and sometimes Turkish influence in the region.

In 2002, Iran's covert nuclear program was first revealed, and Iran denied seeking a weapon. In 2003, Iran's AMAD Project was suspended following Supreme Leader Ali Khamenei's fatwa against nuclear weapons. In 2005, the US began imposing sanctions targeting Iran's nuclear program, and in 2006 the United Nations Security Council (UNSC) imposed a series of sanctions against Iran. The US and Israel conducted a campaign of cyberwarfare against Iranian nuclear facilities to disrupt their operations, while Israel assassinated several top Iranian nuclear scientists. The UNSC concerns about Iran's nuclear program from 2006 (Note: The problems indicated by the UNSC during 2006 in their first resolution were specifically "uranium enrichment and reprocessing" in the second resolution of that year; additionally use or attempted use of "heavy water".) led to the multilateral Joint Comprehensive Plan of Action (JCPOA) between Iran and the P5+1 and the EU in 2015.

In January 2020, US president Donald Trump ordered the assassination of Qasem Soleimani, the commander of the Iranian Quds Force. Following the October 7 attacks on Israel and the start of the Gaza war, tensions further escalated with Israel fighting Iran-backed militias across the Middle East, including Hamas, (Note: Sometimes included in the "Axis of Resistance".) Hezbollah, and the Houthis. Israeli strikes on the Iranian consulate in Damascus and the assassinations of Ismail Haniyeh and Hassan Nasrallah in 2024 were met with Iranian strikes on Israel in April and October. In June 2025, Israel launched the Twelve-Day War by attacking Iranian military and nuclear facilities, provoking Iranian counter-strikes. The United States also joined in support by striking Iranian nuclear facilities during the Twelve-Day War, which ended in a ceasefire.

In early 2026, Israeli prime minister Benjamin Netanyahu lobbied President Donald Trump for a joint military strike on Iran, specifically targeting its leadership. Following high-level meetings in February, Trump authorized "Operation Epic Fury", with reports citing Israeli intelligence provided by Netanyahu as a decisive factor in the decision.

=== Nuclear activity in the Middle East ===
==== Iranian nuclear program ====
Nuclear enrichment has been considered a component of Iranian national development plans since the Shah's regime, when the first nuclear program was developed. Iran retained its nuclear program after the 1979 revolution, and has long denied seeking nuclear weapons, saying its enrichment efforts were to generate nuclear power for civilian use. Despite Iran's compliance with the JCPOA, Trump withdrew the US from the deal in 2018, re-imposed sanctions, and adopted a "maximum pressure" strategy. The Biden administration kept most of these sanctions, further damaging Iran's economy. Trump continued the "maximum pressure" approach in his second term.

In September 2025, the UN reimposed sanctions on Iran using the "snapback" mechanism, causing the currency to weaken, resulting in price increases for food supplies such as meat, rice, and other staples, freezing Iranian assets abroad, suspending arms transactions, and imposing penalties related to the country's ballistic-missile programme. Treasury Secretary Scott Bessent labeled the collapse of the Iranian currency in December 2025 as the strategy's "grand culmination". At his State of the Union Address in February 2026, Trump remarked that Iran had restarted its nuclear program and was developing missiles capable of striking the US. Trump's remark contradicted his previous statements that Iran's nuclear program was "obliterated" and US intelligence reports that Iran did not pose any threat towards the US, and needed until 2035 to build such missiles to do so.

On 12 June 2025, the International Atomic Energy Agency (IAEA) found Iran non-compliant with its NPT safeguards agreement for the first time since 2005. A few days later, it was reported that Iran had stored highly enriched uranium in an underground facility that was undamaged by US bombings in 2025. Subsequently, Iran denied the IAEA access to nuclear facilities that had been bombed, but did provide access to all unaffected facilities. Mohammad Eslami, the head of the Atomic Energy Organization of Iran, said Iran would not permit inspections of facilities struck by the US until the IAEA established rules for the post-war situation, insisting on codified protocols for internationally protected facilities subjected to military attacks, and that the IAEA condemn the attacks.

In February 2026, Iran informed the IAEA that normal safeguards were "legally untenable and materially impracticable" as a result of threats and "acts of aggression", leaving the IAEA unable to verify that Iran had suspended enrichment or confirm the status of its stockpile, though it found no evidence Iran was weaponizing. Analysts in the UK and US characterized Iran's strategy as nuclear hedging. The Bulletin of the Atomic Scientists said that Iran was using its enrichment program and uranium stockpiles for leverage in international negotiations, and was willing to dilute or export its higher-level enriched uranium in exchange for sanctions relief and prevention of attacks.

==== Israel and nuclear weapons ====
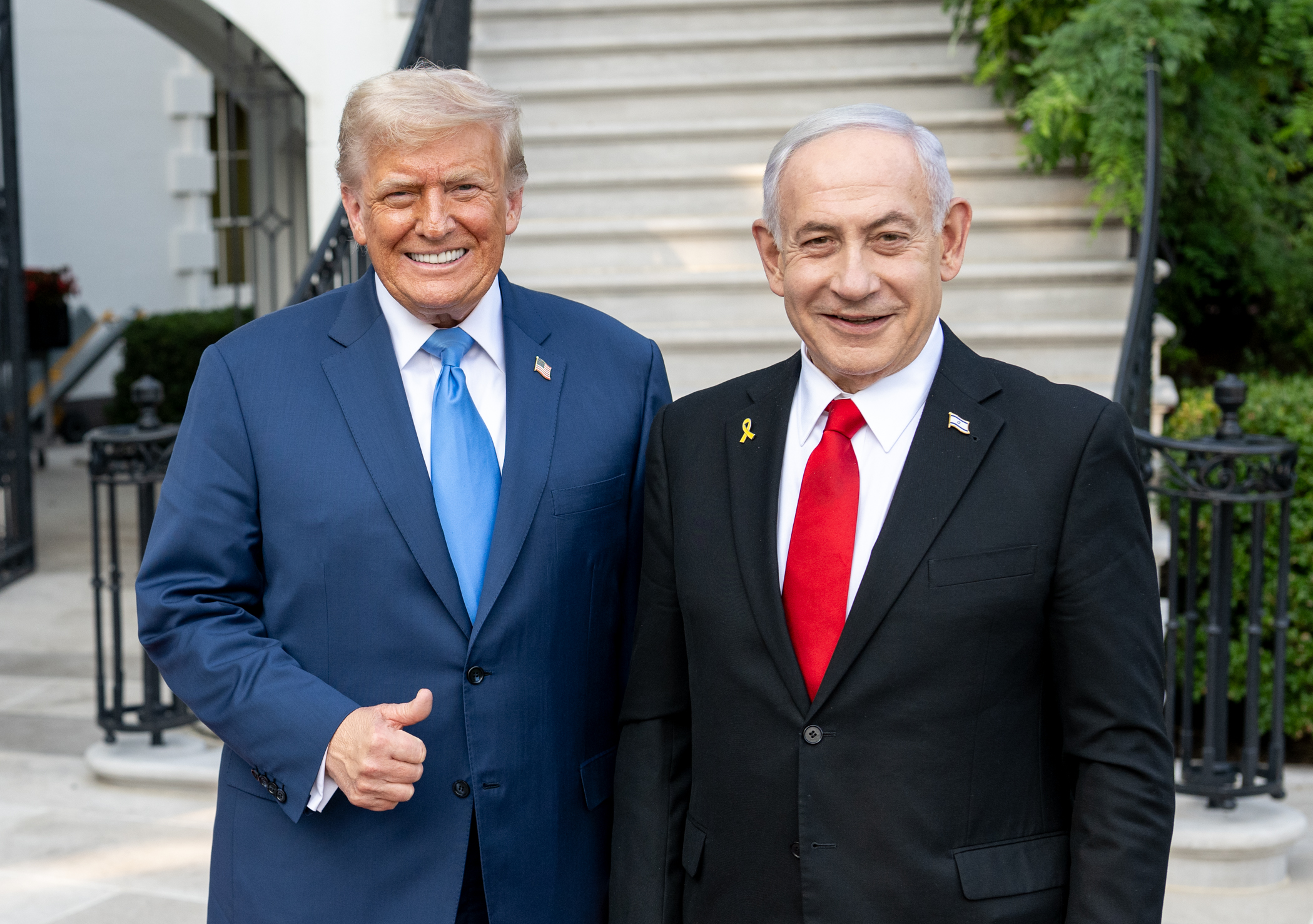
Israeli prime minister Benjamin Netanyahu successfully lobbied the Trump administration for military intervention. Pictured in July 2025, during Netanyahu's third visit to the White House.

Israel is widely believed to possess nuclear weapons, with an estimated stockpile of between 90 and 400 nuclear warheads. (Note: There are a wide range of estimates as to the size of the Israeli nuclear arsenal. For a compiled list of estimates, see Avner Cohen (2010). The Worst-Kept Secret: Israel's bargain with the Bomb. Columbia University Press. Table 1, p. xxvii and p. 82.) Israel is the only nuclear-armed country that does not officially acknowledge its nuclear weapons capability. Some scholars have argued that Israel's nuclear weapons have incentivized Iran to develop its own nuclear program, seen as maintaining a balance of nuclear deterrence, or causing a regional nuclear arms race. Citing security threats, Israel rejects international calls to accede to the Treaty on the Non-Proliferation of Nuclear Weapons or to participate in negotiations of a Middle East nuclear weapon free zone. This has frustrated both US and UK diplomatic efforts towards such a zone. Scholars also suggest US tacit acceptance of the Israeli nuclear weapons capability is seen as a double standard that undermines its diplomatic credibility in Middle East nonproliferation negotiations.

=== Prelude ===
Tension between Iran and the United States during negotiations over Iran's nuclear program intensified in January 2026 when Iranian security forces violently suppressed anti-government protesters.

The US began its greatest buildup of military assets in the region since the Iraq War in 2003. The US accused Iran of building up its nuclear and missile programs to threaten the United States and its allies. Iran accused the US of disinformation. Gulf states like Qatar predicted that escalations could severely harm the region. Negotiations regarding the Iranian nuclear program were held in February until the US and Israel commenced military strikes in Iran on 28 February 2026.

== Hostilities ==
=== First three days of war (27 February – 1 March) ===
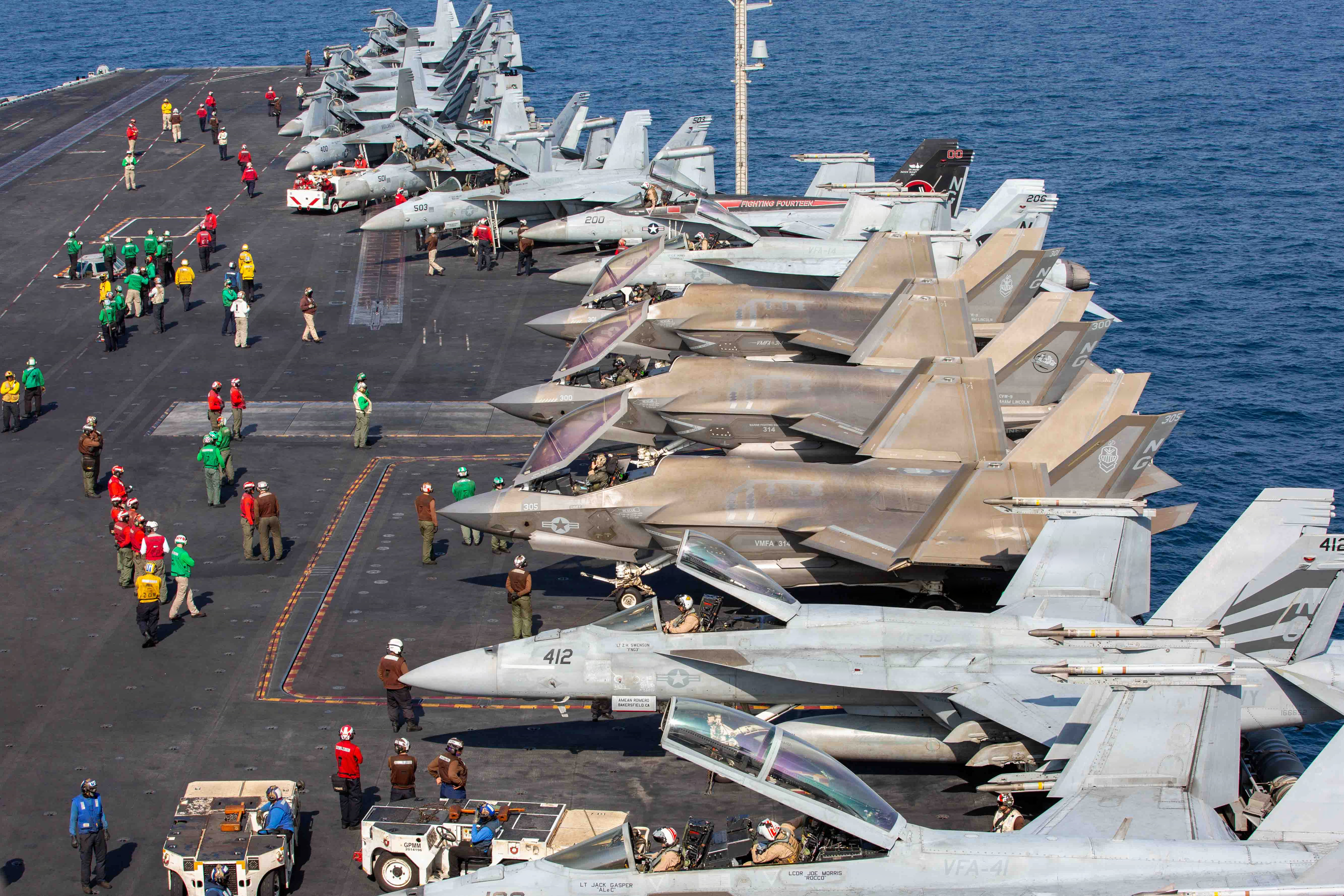
27 February: US aircraft sit on the flight deck of USS Abraham Lincoln

On 27 February at 3:38 p.m. EST (11:08 p.m. IRST), Trump, traveling on Air Force One to Texas, authorized Operation Epic Fury. US missiles, drones, and Israeli fighter jets began striking Iran the next day, around 9:45 am. IRST (1:15 am. EST). The strikes took place during negotiations over Iran's nuclear program, and coincided with the holy month of Ramadan. The operation was codenamed Operation Roaring Lion (Note: Hebrew: מִבְצַע שְׁאָגַת הָאֲרִי, romanized: Mivtsá She'agát Ha'arí, pronounced [mivˈt͡sä ʃe̞.äˈɡätʰ hä.ʔäˈʁi]) by Israel. The Israeli Air Force (IAF) said it struck 500 military targets in Iran in the largest combat sortie in its history. Iranian naval vessels were also targeted. Israel said it used over 1,200 bombs in 24 hours. US strikes were carried out by planes based around the Middle East and from aircraft carriers.

28 February: Trump addresses the nation about the strikes

Initial strikes killed Iran's supreme leader Ali Khamenei and other top Iranian officials, and hundreds of Iranians were killed or injured. The Iranian Red Crescent said 24 provinces were affected. The strikes were coupled with cyberattacks on Iranian infrastructure, media, and phone apps, with messages calling on Iranians to rise up against their government. The cyberattacks resulted in a near-total internet blackout in Iran, lasting over 60 hours with connectivity dropping to as low as 1% of normal levels, disrupting government communications, state media, and public services.

Iran restricted internet access, allowing access only to government-approved users until 26 May. On 28 February, Trump released a statement saying the purpose of the strikes was regime change, citing Iran's support for non-state actors such as Hamas and Hezbollah, killings of protesters, chants of "Death to America", and alleged history of attacking US civilians and soldiers, as well as the Iran hostage crisis. Trump and Benjamin Netanyahu warned of the potential threat of nuclear weapons in Iran and called on Iranians to overthrow their government. Israeli defense minister Israel Katz labeled the strikes a "pre-emptive attack" intended to "remove threats to...Israel". Iran denied that it intended to attack the US.

A map of major US military bases and installations in the Middle East, including bases used during the strikes

1 March: Trump delivers an update about the strikes.

Iranian units reacted within hours by launching missiles and drones. Iran codenamed its response Operation True Promise IV, (Note: Previously, Iran had launched I, II, and III on a more limited scale.) (Note: Persian: عملیات وعده صادق ۴, romanized: Amaliyat-e Va'deh-ye Sadegh 4) and state media dubbed the events the Ramadan War. (Note: Persian: جنگ رمضان, romanized: Jang-e Ramazān) Among the first targets were American radars in the Middle East which degraded missile-warning capability in the region. Iran struck Israeli targets in Tel Aviv and Haifa as well as countries throughout the Persian Gulf. Targets included Bahrain's capital Manama, Kuwait International Airport, the United Arab Emirates' capital Abu Dhabi, Riyadh and Eastern Province in Saudi Arabia, and Erbil International Airport and the US Consulate General in Erbil in Iraq.

Multiple American strategic sites were locally targeted and attacked by Iran. On 1 or 2 March, Iran struck the radar bases for US THAAD missile defense systems in Jordan, the UAE and Saudi Arabia, destroying at least one. On 1 March, Iran launched more strikes, including missiles and drones on Bahrain, Israel, Jordan, Kuwait, Qatar, Saudi Arabia, and the UAE. The UK reported "missiles fired in the direction of Cyprus", but "don't believe they were targeted at Cyprus". The presidents of Cyprus and Northern Cyprus denied any missiles were fired at Cyprus. The Palau-flagged Skylight and Marshall Islands-flagged MKD VYOM tankers were targeted off Oman's coast. Shipping through the Strait of Hormuz slowed to a standstill, with 150 freight ships, including oil tankers, stalled.

British prime minister Keir Starmer said the US could use British bases for "defensive" strikes on Iran and disclosed that Ukrainian and other specialists would aid Gulf efforts to foil Iranian drone strikes. Saudi crown prince Mohammed bin Salman, with US backing, vowed to employ military force against Iranian incursions, calling Iranian strikes "cowardly" due to Saudi airspace being closed to US and Israeli attackers. Trump announced that the US had accepted an Iranian proposal to negotiations. However, Ali Larijani ruled out talks.

=== End of first week (2–6 March) ===
2 March: A montage of US Central Command strikes

On 2 March, the US embassy in Kuwait was struck and closed indefinitely. The US-flagged tanker Stena Imperative and the Honduras-flagged tanker Athe Nova were struck. An advisor to an IRGC commander said he would set fire to any ship coming through the Strait of Hormuz, and added that no oil would leave the area. Qatari air defenses shot down two Iranian Su-24 bombers. (Note: Iran confirmed the Qatari claim on 15 August 2026. One Iranian fighter jet pilot was killed in the strike. Iran accused Qatar Armed Forces of capturing three Iranian fighter jet pilots.) The Qatari Ministry of Defense announced that Ras Laffan Industrial City, the main Qatari gas facility, and Mesaieed Industrial Area were struck by Iranian drones. According to satellite imagery analysis by the Energy Economics and Society Research Institute, Ras Laffan appeared to not have been damaged before the "unprecedented shutdown" which sent fuel prices higher.

The US and Israel attacked the Natanz Nuclear Facility and the Iranian media reported damage to the Khatam-al-Anbia and Gandhi hospitals. In a friendly fire incident, the pilot of an F/A-18 of the Kuwait Air Force shot down three US F-15E fighters. Israel and Hezbollah exchanged strikes. Hezbollah began firing rockets and missiles on Israel in retaliation for the killing of Khamenei. Hezbollah stated that the attack was a "defensive act" after more than a year of Israeli attacks despite a 2024 truce. It added that it restarted fighting to force Israel to stop its aggression and evacuate from seized Lebanese territories, emphasizing that the move was unrelated to the war.

Lebanon banned military activities by Hezbollah after the attacks. An IDF spokesperson stated the attack was "an official declaration of war by Hezbollah" and vowed to "neutralize" the threat. Israel struck southern Lebanon, Beirut, and the Beqaa Valley, with the IDF saying it had killed the head of Hezbollah's intelligence Hussein Makled and Adham Adnan al-Othman, the head of Palestinian Islamic Jihad's armed wing, the Al-Quds Brigades. The Royal Air Force station at Akrotiri, Cyprus, was targeted by a drone strike causing damage to a runway.

Another strike on Cyprus led to Greece announcing that it would deploy frigates and F-16s to defend Cyprus from strikes by Iran. The pro-Iran militant group Iraqi Guardians of Blood Brigades claimed responsibility for attacks on the US Victory Base near Baghdad International Airport and Erbil in the Kurdistan Region of Iraq. The Islamic Resistance in Iraq claimed responsibility for 23 drone strikes on US assets in Erbil.

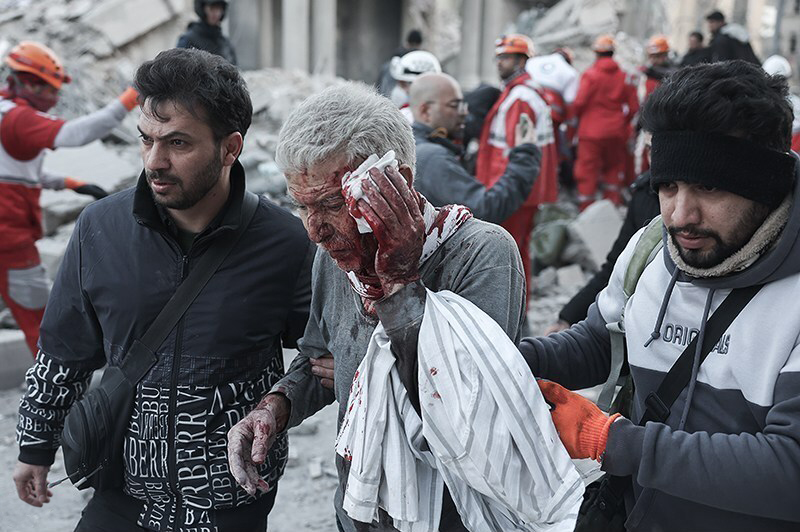
3 March: Enghelab Square, Tehran

On 3 March, US and Israeli strikes destroyed the SNSC headquarters, the Expediency Discernment Council building in Tehran, and what Israeli officials described as an alleged underground nuclear weapons facility called Min Zadai. The proximity of these strikes to the Bushehr Nuclear Power Plant (about 12 km (7.5 mi) away) prompted the Russian agency Rosatom to suspend construction on new units and evacuate non-essential staff. A CIA site in the US embassy in Riyadh was hit by Iranian drones. US officials said its forces had severely damaged Iran's naval capabilities, mainly in the Gulf of Oman, where several Iranian warships were destroyed and key bases hit.

Debris from an airstrike damaged Golestan Palace, a UNESCO World Heritage Site, causing UNESCO to issue a statement that damaging UNESCO sites is against international law. Israel Katz authorized a ground invasion of Lebanon on 3 March with forces from the 91st Division, with the stated goal to establish a "security layer" against Hezbollah. The Lebanese government reported that Israeli attacks reached Kfarkela and Qouzah, leading the Lebanese army to redeploy from newly established border posts. Israel reported that it killed Daoud Alizadeh, the commander of the Quds Force's Lebanon branch, in Tehran.

Western diplomats said Qatar had struck Iran after Iran had attempted to strike Doha's airport and Qatar shot down two Iranian Su-24 bombers. Qatar denied the accusation that it had joined the "campaign targeting Iran". Iran warned it would hit all economic hubs in the Middle East, and any defensive European military involvement would be considered an act of war. On 4 March, US secretary of state Marco Rubio announced that the US-Israeli attacks on Iran would increase in intensity. Israel attacks hit the Basij headquarters.

The IDF announced that an F-35I "Adir" shot down a Russian-made Iranian Yak-130 fighter jet over Tehran, the first time that an F-35 shot down a crewed fighter jet in air-to-air combat, and the first time the IAF shot down an aircraft since 1985. Iran launched strikes against the Al Udeid Air Base, and Aramco's Ras Tanura oil refining facility. The US ordered the evacuation of non-essential workers in Cyprus in anticipation of Iranian strikes. A ballistic missile launched from Iran was intercepted by NATO air defense systems as it entered Turkish airspace, marking an escalation in the conflict. Turkey asserted its right to self-defense after the missile landed in Dörtyol, Hatay Province, and NATO secretary general Mark Rutte stated that the alliance was committed to defending Turkey.

4 March: USS Charlotte torpedoed IRIS Dena

An Iranian frigate, IRIS Dena, was sunk in the Indian Ocean by United States Navy submarine USS Charlotte, about 40 nautical miles (74 km; 46 mi) south of Galle, Sri Lanka. The vessel was returning to Iran following its participation in the International Fleet Review 2026 and the multilateral Exercise MILAN at Visakhapatnam, India. The exercise required ships not to carry ammunition, and the US likely knew the Dena was defenseless, since it sent a maritime patrol aircraft to participate. It was the first ship sunk by a submarine in active combat since the Falklands War, and the first by an American submarine since World War II. (Note: In 2010, South Korean corvette ROKS Cheonan was sunk near the border with North Korea. An investigation into the incident by a group of countries concluded that it was sunk by a torpedo launched by a North Korean Yeono-class midget submarine, though North Korea denied any responsibility.) 104 Iranians were killed.

The government of Azerbaijan said on 5 March that drones from Iran struck Azerbaijan's Nakhchivan exclave damaging an airport and injuring two civilians. Keir Starmer confirmed UK's bases on Cyprus would be used to defend the airspace of Jordan from Iranian drones, while Italy, the Netherlands and Spain confirmed they would send warships to defend Cyprus. The IDF killed Hamas official Wassim Attallah al-Ali in Beddawi, Lebanon. Trump said on 6 March that there were "no time limits" for how long the war could continue. The Iranian tanker IRIS Bushehr was interned by the Sri Lanka Navy, marking the first instance of a warship being interned in a neutral country since World War II.

=== Second week (7–13 March) ===
On 7 March, the US sent a third aircraft carrier, USS George H. W. Bush, to the Middle East. The British aircraft carrier HMS Prince of Wales was placed on advanced readiness to defend British interests in the region. On 7 March, Iranian president Masoud Pezeshkian apologized for strikes on neighboring countries, citing miscommunication in the ranks. He stated those countries would not be targeted unless the US launched attacks from them; however, Iranian attacks continued, highlighting limited control over the IRGC chief Ahmad Vahidi. On 8 March, Khamenei's second son, Mojtaba, was designated as Iran's new supreme leader. US Central Command posted a message on X which urged "civilians in Iran to stay at home" and alleged that "[t]he Iranian regime is knowingly endangering innocent lives".

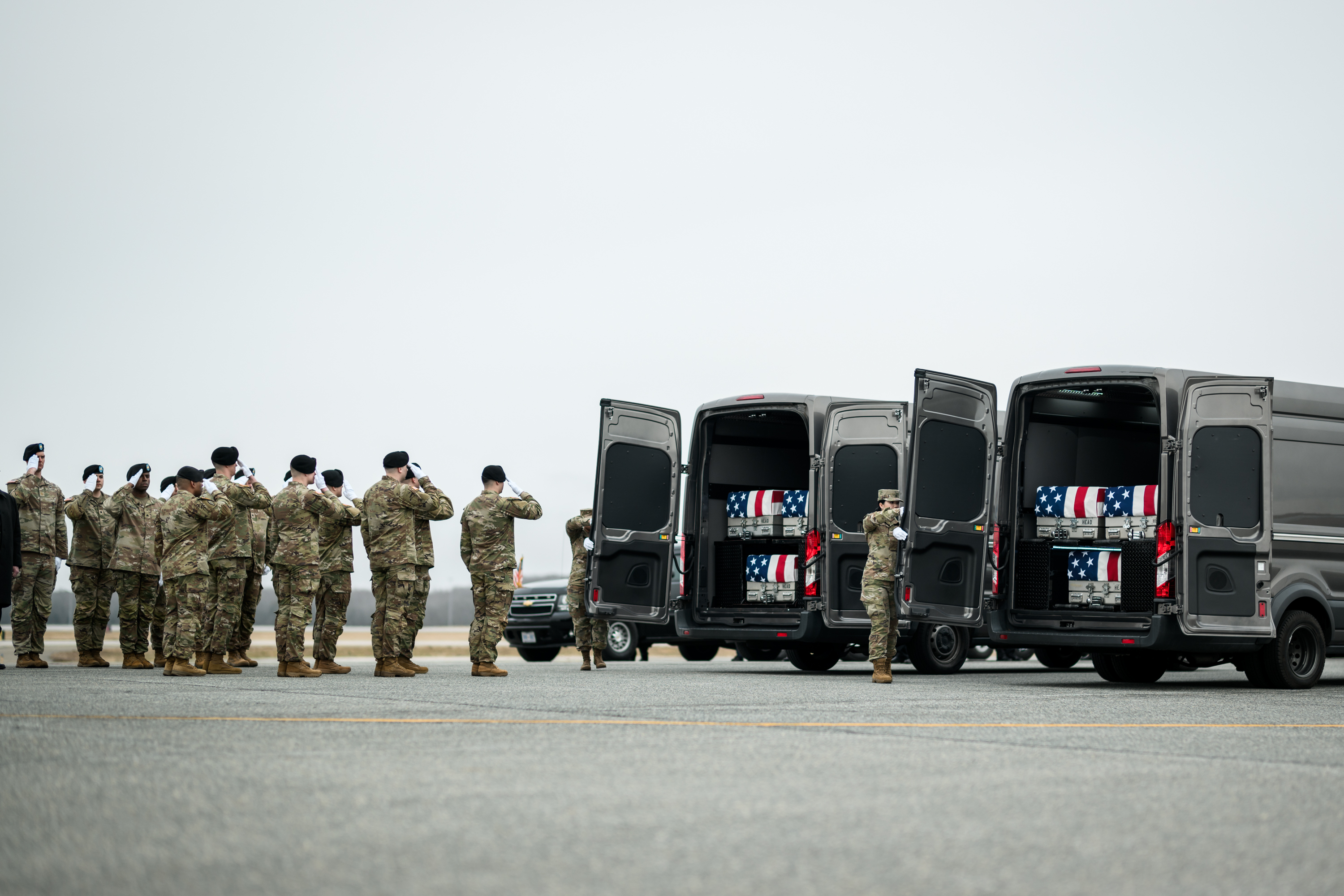
Six dead US soldiers from the 2026 Port Shuaiba drone attack are transferred to the US on 7 March 2026

Israeli airstrikes hit Iranian oil storage facilities, killing four people. Strikes on fuel depots near Tehran caused a "river of fire" to pour out along the streets, and the city became engulfed in thick black smoke, causing toxic acidic rain to fall in the surrounding area. US Central Command announced the death of a seventh US service member from an Iranian attack. The UK confirmed its forces had intercepted an Iranian drone headed towards Iraq, and declared its intention to send a Merlin helicopter to the region to detect aerial threats. According to the Iranian Red Crescent Society, 65 schools and 32 medical facilities had been targeted, and more than 10,000 civilian sites damaged.

On 9 March, NATO confirmed the interception of a second ballistic missile in Turkish airspace. Turkey deployed six F-16s and air defense systems to Northern Cyprus. Trump stated that "the war is very complete, pretty much", after speaking with Russian president Putin, and said "we already won the war in many ways". Following Syrian president Ahmed al-Sharaa's support for Lebanon's objective to disarm Hezbollah, the group targeted the city of Inkhil in Syria. About a dozen B-1B bombers arrived at bases in Europe.

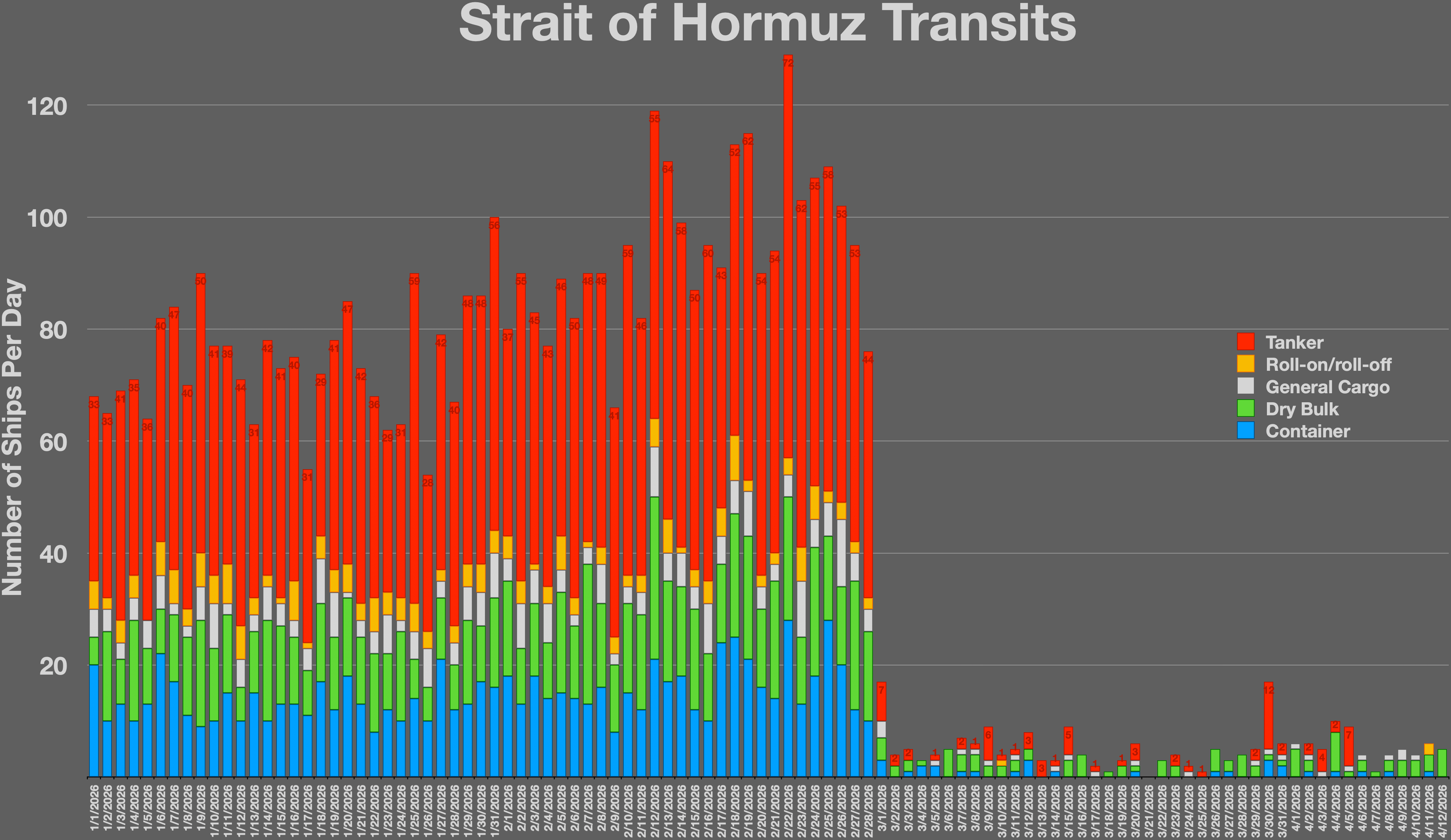
Strait of Hormuz transits dropped significantly since the start of the war.

GPS jamming of uncertain origin disrupted navigation of ships near the Strait of Hormuz. The United States Department of State designated the Muslim Brotherhood branch in Sudan as a terrorist organization. On 10 March, an IRGC commander stated that Iran was only firing missiles with payloads of 1,000 kg or more. AFP reported that Iran's attacks were the "most intense and heaviest" since the start of the war. This showed a shift in tactics from saturating air defenses to high-impact penetration strikes. American general Dan Caine acknowledged that Iran was fighting back, but not harder than the US expected. Following the Syrian president's support for the disarmament of Hezbollah and a campaign of mobilization by the Syrian army on the Lebanese border, shells from Lebanon landed in Serghaya, 20 km (12 mi) from Damascus where the Syrian Armed Forces forces presided. Israel issued an urgent evacuation notice to southern suburbs of Beirut.

Defense analyst AJ Jaff reported that Iran's ballistic missile launch rate fell 92% from day one of the war (480 to 40) and the drone launch rate fell 92% (720 to 60). On 11 March 14 US bombers were deployed to RAF Fairford in the UK, where bombs were being prepared for loading. This followed US defense secretary Hegseth's statement that it was the "most intense day of strikes inside Iran". Israel reportedly struck the Parchin military complex. A branch of Bank Sepah in Tehran was hit by a strike, prompting the IRGC to warn that they could retaliate by striking US or Israeli banks in the region. Iran hit Stryker, a US-based medical supply company with a cyberattack. On 12 March, UNICEF reported that 300 children had been killed, thousands injured, hundreds of thousands displaced, and millions unable to attend schools due to the war.

Iranian deputy intelligence minister Akbar Ghaffari was killed in an airstrike. An Iranian attack set two tankers on fire off the Iraqi coast, killing one person. The historical Safavid-era building of Rashk-e Jenan, was destroyed by US-Israeli strikes. Other buildings damaged included the Chehel Sotoun pavilion, Rakib Khaneh Mansion, Timurid Hall, Ashraf Hall and the Ali Qapu palace. Many affected buildings and monuments were legally protected by the Blue Shield International, which called damaging them a war crime. French soldiers were injured in a drone strike at a base in Iraqi Kurdistan. French president Emmanuel Macron announced on 13 March that a soldier was killed in the attack.

On 13 March, to alleviate the economic costs of the war, the US temporarily lifted restrictions on the sale of Russian oil. Iran announced a coordinated offensive by its navy, army, and Hezbollah against Israel and US bases. Israel reported that 58 people have been hospitalized due to injuries following a missile strike. Kuwait authorities stated that defense equipment and the country's main airport were attacked, and power lines gone out of service. Missiles entered Turkish air space and were intercepted, with explosions heard near Adana. Israel struck IRGC checkpoints after receiving tip-offs by informants on the ground. Reuters reported Israel had struck positions of the Basij used to suppress Iranian protests.

=== Third week (14–20 March) ===
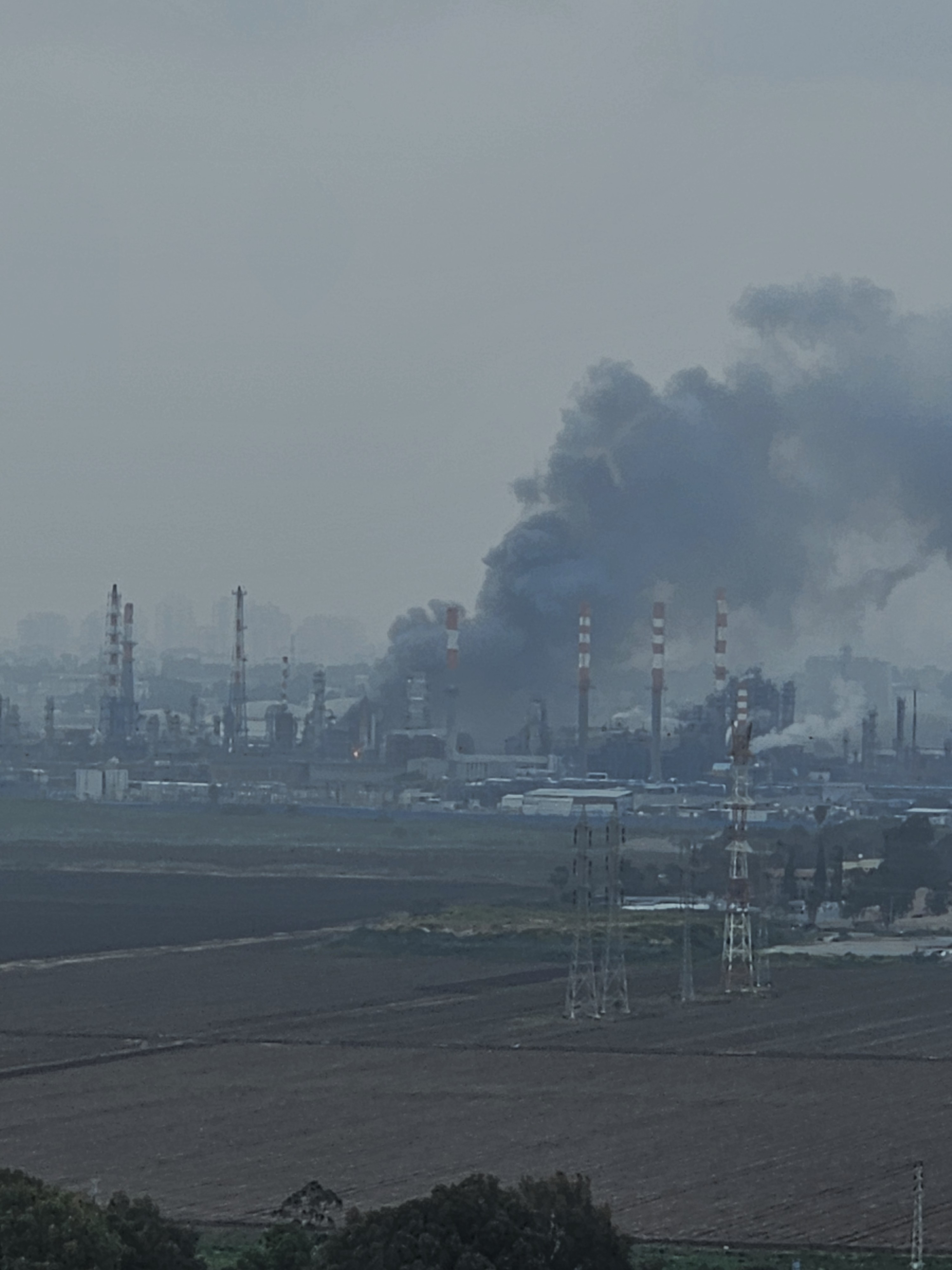
An Iranian missile hit Haifa oil refineries in Haifa Bay, 19 March

During the third week, analysts found little evidence of significant defections in the Iranian military, (Note: Multiple sources:) which have been considered a necessary condition for regime change. The US conducted an attack on Kharg Island, a key oil export hub home to 90 percent of Iran's oil exports. Over 90 military sites were targeted; oil infrastructure was not targeted "for reasons of decency", according to Trump. On 14 March, Kata'ib Hezbollah security commander Abu Ali al-Askari was killed in an airstrike in Baghdad. The Royal Tulip Al Rasheed Hotel in Baghdad's Green Zone was hit by a drone whilst hosting an EU and Saudi Arabian delegation. The attack was not claimed by anyone; however, due to the proximity of a similar attack 48 hours earlier on the US embassy in Baghdad, there were suspicions it was an Iranian attack.

On 16 March, China and US-aligned NATO nations in Europe rejected Trump's call to provide military support to reopen the Strait of Hormuz. Trump rebuked his NATO allies, calling their decision a "very foolish mistake". On the same day, White House press secretary Karoline Leavitt stated that the Trump administration will not rule out a military draft. She clarified that a draft was not "part of the current plan" but that the president was open to any suggestions.

On 17 March, Trump made a statement on Truth Social renouncing NATO's assistance, and unexpectedly, criticizing US allies in the Indo-Pacific (namely Japan, South Korea, and Australia) for refusing to join US-led attacks on Iran. Trump declared that the United States "[does] not need the help of anyone" regarding the war. In the morning of 17 March, senior Iranian officials, including Ali Larijani and Basij chief Gholamreza Soleimani were targeted by Israeli airstrikes. Both their deaths were later confirmed by Iranian state media. In response, Iran launched a missile barrage that killed two Israeli civilians in Ramat Gan. The same day, Israel launched a ground invasion of southern Lebanon.

Video of suspected Iranian strike on a USAF F-35, released by Tasnim News Agency, 19 March 2026, the first case of a damaged stealth fighter in combat

On 18 March, Israel struck the South Pars natural gas field in the Persian Gulf and its neighboring refineries in Iran with US coordination. In retaliation, Iran attacked the world's largest LNG production facility in Qatar, while Trump denied knowledge of the South Pars attack. Israel said it had killed Iranian intelligence minister Esmaeil Khatib in an overnight airstrike. Pezeshkian confirmed Khatib's killing. A hair salon in Beit Awwa was struck by a projectile, killing four women, with Israeli authorities stating that it was most likely cluster munitions and Palestinian authorities saying it was an errant Israeli interceptor.

On 19 March, a US F-35 made an emergency landing after a suspected hit by Iranian forces. A BAZAN Group refinery in Haifa was hit during a broader Iranian missile attack on the area as a retaliation for Israeli attacks on South Pars gas facilities. Netanyahu insisted that "You can't make a revolution from the air" and that "there must be a ground component—I won't share with you all the options", implying that there was a potential for limited assault operations involving soldiers on the ground in Iran. The US began an aerial campaign against Iranian vessels and drones in the Strait of Hormuz in an effort to reopen it to international shipping.

=== Fourth week (21–27 March) ===
Admiral Brad Cooper said that the US military had struck more than 8,000 Iranian military targets, including 130 vessels. On 21 March, the US conducted strikes on the Natanz Nuclear Facility using bunker buster bombs to target the site. Russia condemned the strikes on Natanz as a "blatant violation of international law" while the IAEA urged military restraint "to avoid any risk of a nuclear accident". In response, Iran struck the southern Israeli town of Dimona, injuring at least 78 people. Iran said that it targeted the Shimon Peres Negev Nuclear Research Center.

Citing unnamed US officials, CNN and The Wall Street Journal reported that Iran unsuccessfully attempted to strike the joint US–UK military base at Diego Garcia on the Chagos Islands in the British Indian Ocean Territory. The report said one of the missiles broke apart mid-flight, while another was intercepted by a SM-3 air defense missile launched by a US warship. Israel said that Iran used a two-stage intercontinental ballistic missile to target the island. Iran denied launching missiles towards Diego Garcia, saying that it was an Israeli false flag attack. In response the UK foreign secretary confirmed and denounced the Iranian attack on their end, and additionally expanded permission for the United States to bomb certain targets using their bases. No evidence has been presented that the alleged Iranian missiles neared Diego Garcia or that one was intercepted.

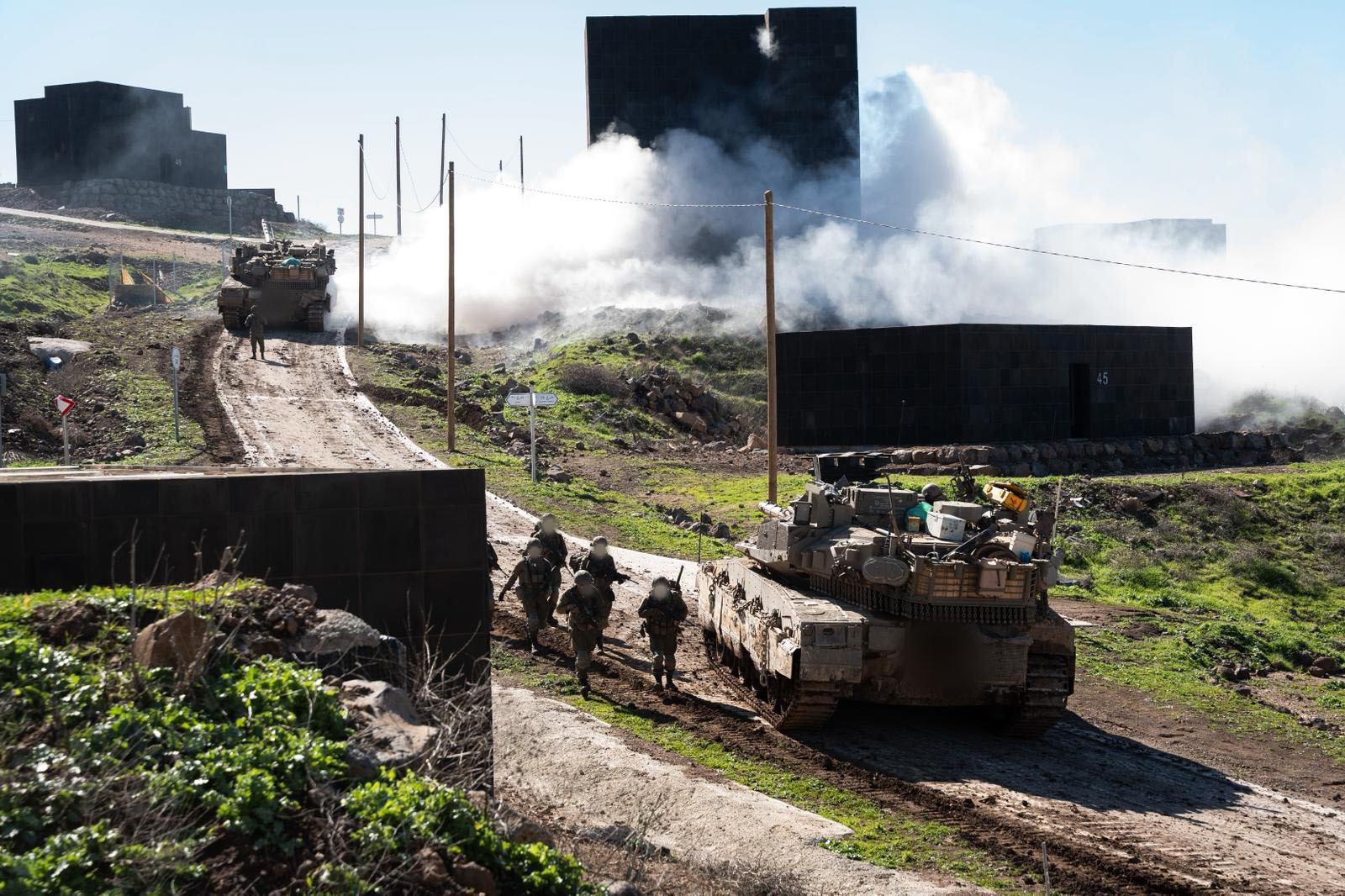
Israeli troops near the Lebanese border on 21 March 2026

The Houthi movement in Yemen warned that it would respond to any escalation against Iran, including efforts to reopen the Strait of Hormuz. It specifically warned the two Arab countries offering to join the Strait of Hormuz campaign—Bahrain and the UAE—that they "will be the first to lose in this battle". The Houthis further threatened to join the war in the event that US allies joined the attack on Iran or if the US and Israel used the Red Sea to carry out operations. Lebanon's government expelled the Iranian ambassador.

Trump issued an ultimatum to Iran, threatening to strike its power plants unless it opened the strait within 48 hours. Iran doubled down, threatening to "completely" close the strait and strike vital infrastructure across the region such as energy and desalination facilities critical for drinking water. Iranian opposition figure and former crown prince Reza Pahlavi called on Trump and Netanyahu to target the military while sparing civilian infrastructure which "Iranians will need to rebuild our country". Halfway through the deadline, Trump announced that he was postponing strikes against Iranian power plants for five days, and said the US was negotiating with Iran to end the war. Iran denied the talks ever took place or were taking place, calling him "deceitful". Iran rejected the 15-point peace plan presented by the US. Iran asserted that Lebanon must be included as part of a ceasefire deal, thereby making a ceasefire conditional on an end to the 2026 Lebanon war against Hezbollah.

On 24 March, Israel or its allies shot down an Iranian missile crossing above Lebanon at high altitude, according to the Lebanese army, which also confirmed that the missile was not targeting Lebanon. This was the first time during the current conflict when a shootdown of an Iranian missile took place over Lebanese territory. A US strike on the Habbaniya military base—which hosts units from the Popular Mobilization Forces—in Al Anbar Governorate killed seven members of the Iraqi Armed Forces and injured 13 others. In response, Iraqi prime minister Mohammed Shia' al-Sudani summoned the US embassy's chargé d'affaires in Baghdad.

Iranian state media threatened that Iran could seize Bahraini and Emirati territory if the US "makes any mistakes", while signaling its readiness to open a new front in Yemen by closing the Bab al-Mandab Strait together with the Houthis. Israel said it killed Iran's top naval commander, Alireza Tangsiri, purportedly as part of an effort to reopen the Strait of Hormuz, which Katz said Tangsiri was "directly responsible" for the closure of.

On 27 March, a day after Trump and Hegseth announced the "neutralization" of Iran's military, an Iranian missile and drone strike on Prince Sultan Air Base damaged several US refueling aircraft and injured at least 15 US soldiers. An E-3 Sentry was also damaged by the strike. Military analyst Cedric Leighton described the attack as a "a serious blow to [US] surveillance capabilities". The same day, Iran blocked two Chinese ships from entering the strait and sought to formalize fees for ships passing through it. Despite pushes for talks, Israeli defense minister Israel Katz publicly vowed to "intensify and expand" Israeli attacks in Iran. The same day, the Shahid Khondab Heavy Water Complex in Arak—which has in the past been used to test uranium enrichment—and the Ardakan yellowcake production plant in Yazd Province were confirmed to have been damaged in Israeli airstrikes.

=== Fifth week (28 March – 3 April) ===
The Houthis joined the war on 28 March launching a ballistic missile towards Israel while stating that they had launched ballistic missiles targeting "sensitive" military sites in Israel; the missile was intercepted and no casualties were reported. The Houthis subsequently launched a second missile at Eilat. In response, the internationally recognized Yemeni government condemned Iran's "frequent attempts to drag Yemen" into conflict "through its terrorist militias". On the same day, 2,500 US marines from the 31st Marine Expeditionary Unit arrived in the Middle East, expected to be part of US efforts to open the Strait of Hormuz.

US Central Command (CENTCOM) stated that it had struck over 11,000 targets in Iran since the beginning of the war. On 28 March, joint US–Israeli airstrikes severely damaged several residential and civilian facilities, including the Iran University of Science and Technology. In response, Iran threatened to attack Israeli and American colleges across the Middle East. Airstrikes also struck a 10,000-cubic-metre (350,000 cu ft) water reservoir in Haftkel, in Khuzestan province. An Iranian missile struck a chemical plant in the Ne'ot Hovav industrial zone, injuring one person and causing fears of a hazardous leak.

A convoy of the Iraqi Popular Mobilization Forces was seen entering Khorramshahr in southwestern Iran. Eleven-year-old child soldier Alireza Jafari was killed in an Israeli drone strike "while serving" at a checkpoint on a Tehran highway; Amnesty International called the organized Iranian recruitment of children as young as Jafari a war crime. On 29 March, Trump stated that he would prefer to "take the oil in Iran". He proposed taking Iran's oil export center, Kharg Island, remarking that the United States could capture the territory "very easily", and implying that the US could occupy it for some time.

On 30 March, Trump said that if a deal were not reached soon and the Strait of Hormuz reopened, the US would strike all of Iran's power plants, oil wells, Kharg Island, and possibly all its desalinization plants, although the feasibility and strategic value of some of Trump's threats were contested. On the same day Turkey and NATO intercepted the fourth missile directed towards Turkish territory. Iran denied firing a missile at Turkey, alleging that it was a false flag attack. The US began flying B-52 bombers over Iranian territory for the first time, indicating its confidence of air supremacy over Iran. The US used bombers to target an ammunition depot and air base in Isfahan, causing large explosions. U.S-allied Gulf states such as Saudi Arabia, the UAE, Kuwait, and Bahrain reportedly pushed Trump to continue the war until there are significant changes in Iran's leadership. American journalist Shelly Kittleson was kidnapped in Baghdad by Kata'ib Hezbollah—the strongest faction within the PMF—who demanded that the Iraqi government release several detained members of the group.

On 1 April, Mehr News Agency, a semi-official Iranian government news outlet, reported that policy expert and former foreign minister Kamal Kharazi was seriously injured and his wife was killed in an airstrike which hit his home. Iranian officials described the attack as an attempt to derail diplomacy, noting that Kharazi was overseeing a possible meeting between Iranian officials and US vice president JD Vance. Airstrikes on the strategically important Hengam Island in the Strait of Hormuz caused seven injuries. Netanyahu stated that the US–Israeli strikes have eliminated Iran's ability to produce nuclear weapons and ballistic missiles, thereby removing "two existential threats" to Israel.

Late in the day on 1 April, Trump made a speech addressing the nation, in which he said that the strikes have "dramatically curtailed" Iranian missile and drone systems, and added that the attacks on Iran will escalate over the next two to three weeks to "bring them back to the Stone Ages, where they belong". On 2 April, two US strikes on the B1 bridge between Tehran and Karaj, which was described as the highest bridge in the Middle East, reportedly killed eight people and wounded 95 others, causing it to collapse. Experts assessed the attack as a possible war crime; it was celebrated by Trump. At the time of the attack, many Iranian families had been gathered in the parks below the bridge to celebrate Sizdah Be-dar.

Iran revealed major damage to the century-old medical center Pasteur Institute of Iran. US defense secretary Hegseth boasted of "death and destruction from the sky all day long". The IDF also announced that one of its strikes in the Kermanshah area of Iran killed Iranian ballistics missile chief Makram Atimi and several battalion commanders from Atimi's central Iranian ballistic missile unit. An Iranian ballistic missile strike damaged an Israeli drone factory in Petah Tikva. On the same day, Iran's army chief, Amir Hatami, stated that if US forces invade the country, "not a single person" among the invaders will survive.

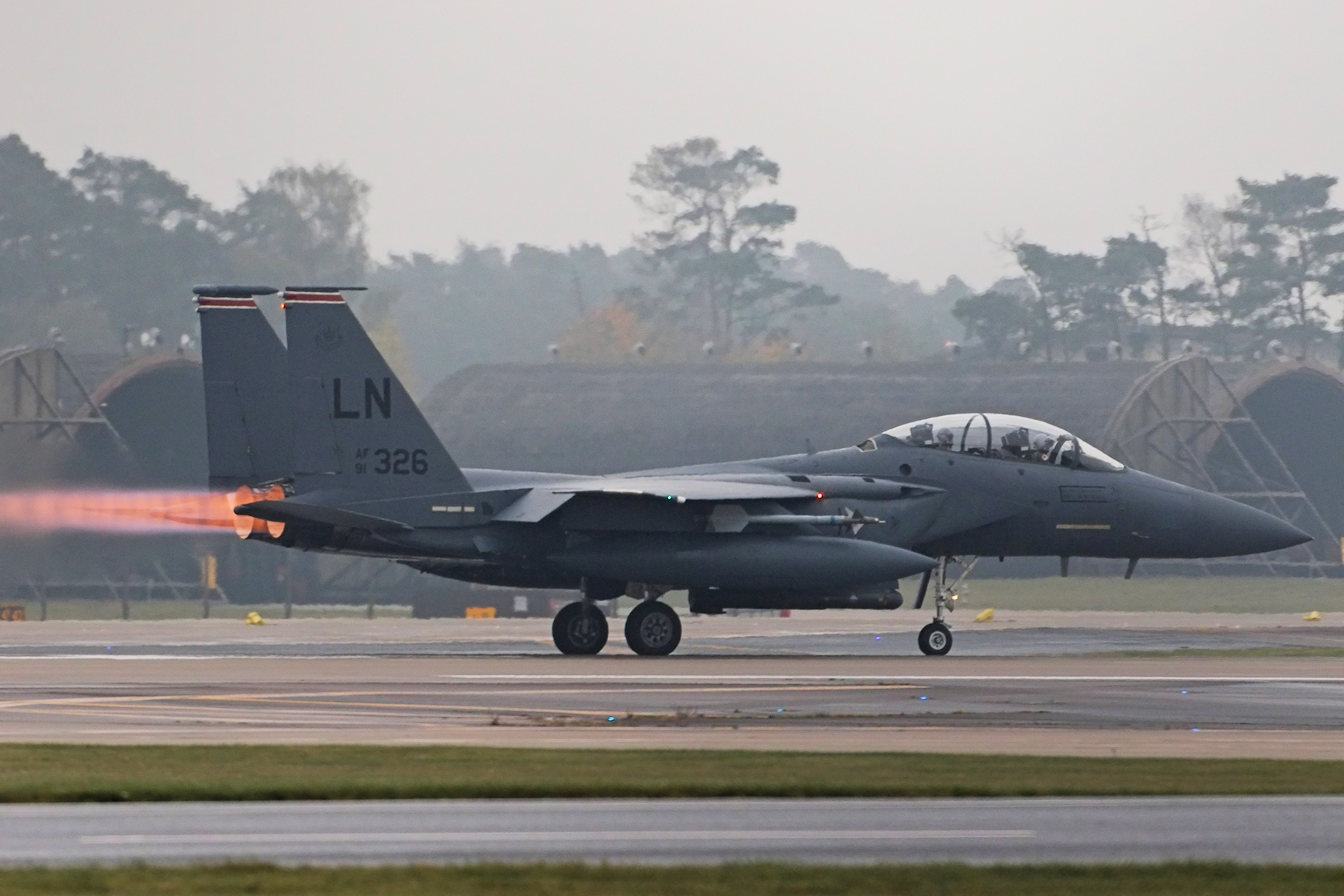
An F-15E Strike Eagle of the 494th Fighter Squadron, similar to the American aircraft shot down

On 3 April, Iranian forces shot down a US Air Force F-15E Strike Eagle fighter jet over the country, with the wreckage falling in the Kohgiluyeh and Boyer-Ahmad province of Iran, the first incident of its kind in more than 20 years. The pilot was rescued that same day, but the WSO remained missing and was rescued alive 48 hours later in a "high-stake" operation involving US special forces supported by 155 aircraft. A US A-10 "Warthog" aircraft was downed and its single crew member ejected near the Strait of Hormuz and was rescued. Iran released a video that, according to Iran, showed the downing of the aircraft using a surface-to-air missile. On the same day, Tehran's Shahid Beheshti University was hit by airstrikes, making the total number of universities hit to more than 30, according to the Iranian Minister of Science.

=== Sixth week (4–7 April) ===
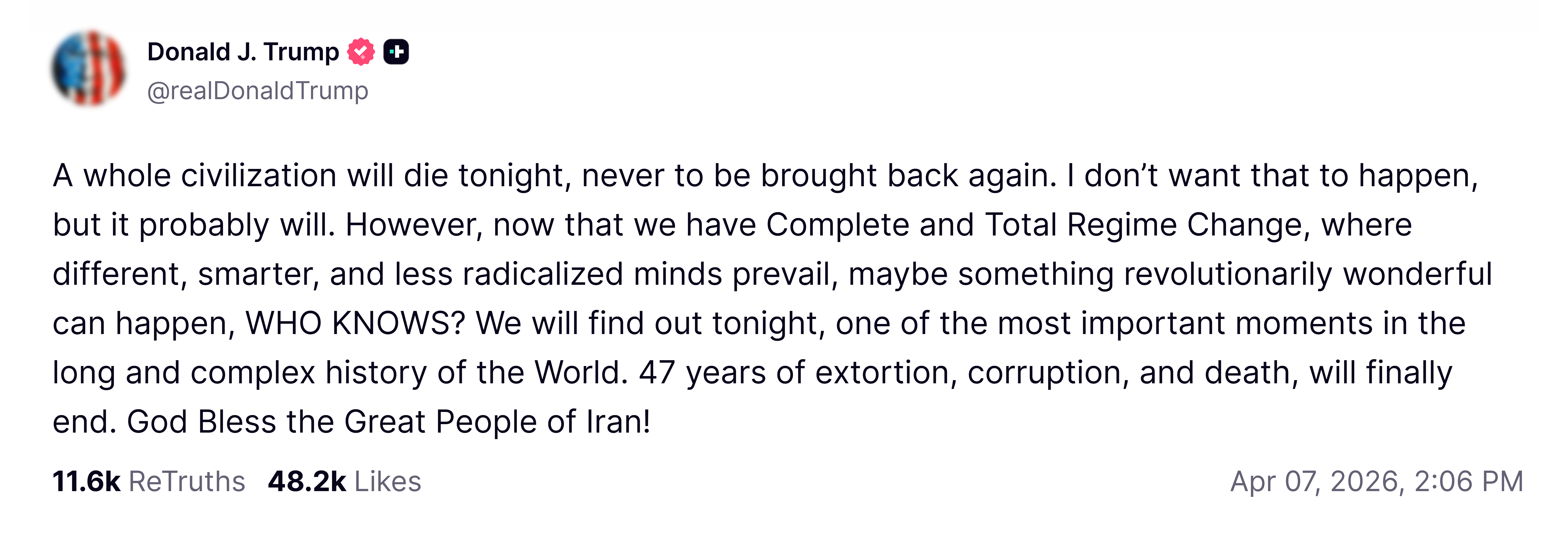
7 April: Truth Social post in which Trump threatened, "[a] whole civilization will die tonight, never to be brought back again"

On 4 April, explosions were reported at an auxiliary building of the Bushehr Nuclear Power Plant as well as the Mahshahr Special Petrochemical Zone in Mahshahr, Iran. The airstrikes in Mahshahr killed at least five and injured 170 others. An Iranian missile strike hit in the vicinity of the IDF's HaKirya headquarters in Tel Aviv. On 5 April, after heavy fighting, the second stranded crew member from the F-15E downed on 3 April was recovered by US forces in a rescue operation, which resulted in damage to helicopters, the shooting down of an A-10 Thunderbolt II, and the destruction of two C-130 Hercules, three IRGC members killed, and several American service members injured.

On 6 April, the IRGC announced that the head of the IRGC's intelligence organization, Major General Majid Khademi, had been killed in a joint US-Israeli airstrike. Their statement said that Khademi had "played a major role in Iran's intelligence and security apparatus over nearly five decades". Israel said that Yazdan Mir, a high-ranking commander of the IRGC Quds Force, had also been killed in the attacks. On the same day, before Trump's deadline for targeting Iranian infrastructure, Israel carried out strikes on the South Pars Petrochemical facility in Asaluyeh, Iran. The IAF said that "85% of Iran's petrochemical exports" had been taken offline by now. At least 34 people, including six children, were killed in US-Israeli airstrikes across Iran, including against Sharif University of Technology and residential areas. Iranian vice president and reformist politician Mohammad Reza Aref, who is also an alumnus of the university, described the alleged use of a bunker-buster bomb as a "symbol of Trump's madness and ignorance".

Members of the Tehran Jewish community navigating the site where the Rafi'-Nia synagogue was destroyed

On 7 April, The Rafi'-Nia synagogue in central Tehran was destroyed in an airstrike. Israel said that the building was destroyed due to collateral damage and that it was never meant to be the direct target of the airstrike. The same day, US forces began strikes on Kharg Island. In response, Iran said its restraint in targeting oil infrastructure in the region would no longer apply. Trump posted to Truth Social that "a whole civilization will die tonight, never to be brought back again", causing international concern that Trump would use nuclear weapons. The Secretary General of Amnesty International said that Trump's statement "may constitute a threat to commit genocide".

Multiple right-wing commentators and many Democrats condemned the post, and some called for him to be removed through the 25th Amendment. The White House denied considering using nuclear weapons and later said that "only the president knows" what he would do on Iran. A leaked US intelligence report concluded that Iran retained 70% of missiles and launchers at this point, despite Trump claims regarding "destruction" of Iran's military.

In the United Nations Security Council, China and Russia vetoed a Bahraini-led draft resolution calling on member states to coordinate efforts to protect commercial shipping in the Strait of Hormuz, with Chinese representative Fu Cong stating that adopting such a draft when the U.S. was threatening the survival of a civilization would send the wrong message. The vetoes were condemned by Trump administration's UN representative Mike Waltz, who accused them of siding with a regime seeking to intimidate the Persian Gulf Arab states into submission.

=== Ceasefire, dual blockade and Islamabad Memorandum (8 April – 19 June) ===
On 7 April, Trump announced that the US and Iran had reached an agreement based on the 10-point proposal mediated by Pakistani prime minister Shehbaz Sharif and Field Marshal Asim Munir. The US, Israel, and Iran agreed to a two-week ceasefire, under which Iran would re-open the Strait of Hormuz. After the announcement, Iran's Lavan Island oil refinery and Sirri Island crude export facilities were struck; no party claimed responsibility. In response, Iran continued missile and drone strikes on Gulf Arab states. The refinery attack was later revealed to have been done secretly by the UAE.

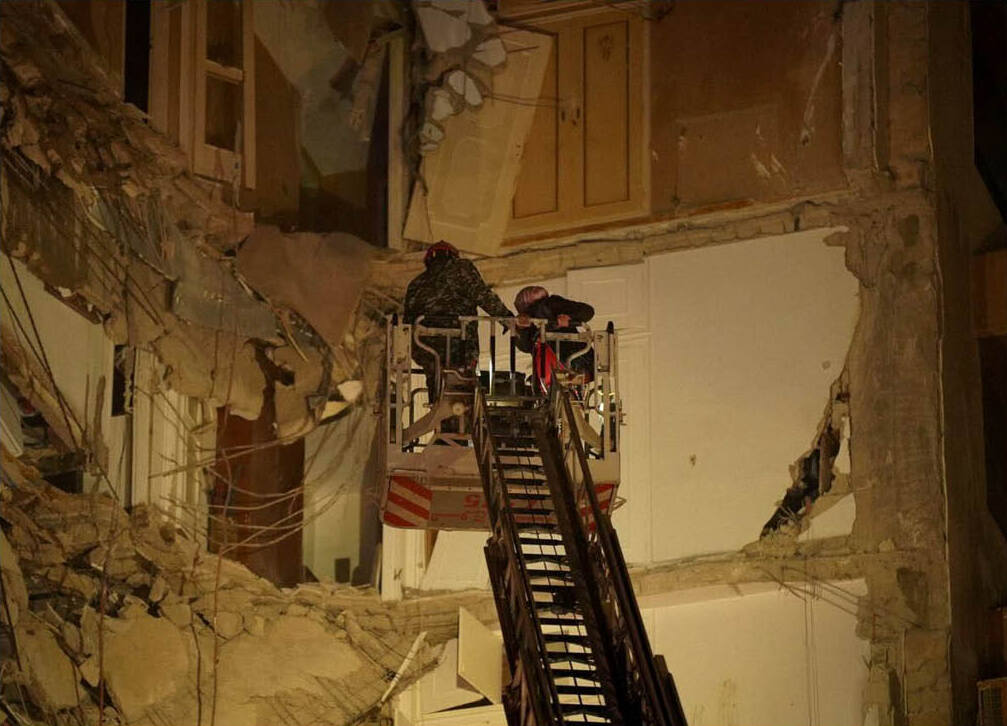
The aftermath of 8 April 2026 Israeli attacks on Beirut, Lebanon

Israel and the US asserted that the ceasefire did not include Lebanon, contradicting the Pakistani mediators and Iran. Hezbollah said it had halted attacks on Israel and on Israeli soldiers in Lebanon. Despite the ceasefire, Israel launched "Operation Eternal Darkness", which, according to Israeli forces, included targeting all Hezbollah's command and control centers in southern Lebanon, Beirut and the Beqaa Valley. Local observers disputed this, saying the attacks were not targeted.

These were the largest attacks since the start of the war, killing at least 357 people and injuring more than 1,200. In Beirut alone, 92 people were killed and at least 740 injured. In response, Iran threatened to attack Israel "if the aggressions against dear Lebanon are not brought to an immediate end". Iran paused Strait of Hormuz traffic over Israeli attacks in Lebanon. Hezbollah claimed responsibility for launching rockets towards northern Israel as a response to "ceasefire violations".

On 11 April, Trump said that American forces had started "clearing" the Strait of Hormuz. Iran stated that an American ship on its way to the strait turned back after being warned. The Wall Street Journal reported US Navy destroyers entered the strait for the first time since the war began. The Iranian government reportedly threatened to attack the ships, accusing the US of a ceasefire violation. US Central Command said the ships were minesweeping. On the same day, the talks between the US and Iran—the highest-level discussions between the two since the 1979 Islamic Revolution—were held in Islamabad, Pakistan, lasting 21 hours. JD Vance announced no agreement was reached and Iran had refused "to accept our terms". Trump stated he no longer cared about negotiations.

Trump declared that the US Navy would begin its blockade of "all Ships trying to enter, or leave, the Strait of Hormuz" from 13 April. He said the US Navy would stop any ships that paid tolls to Iran. United States Central Command clarified that the blockade would only be enforced on ships traveling to or from Iranian ports. The IRGC Navy said any military vessel approaching the strait would be considered a ceasefire violation and meet a "severe response". Trump threatened to strike fast-attack ships of the IRGC Navy, similar to US strikes on drug traffickers during Operation Southern Spear. Iran had 13 days of oil storage capacity, forcing it to shut down its oil fields and potentially damaging them. An analyst estimated loss of import and export capacity would be US$435 million per day.

On 16 April, Trump announced that Israel and Lebanon agreed to a ten-day truce. Iran announced that passage of commercial vessels through the strait would be allowed during the truce, however, Trump said that the blockade would continue, with Iran reimposing restrictions on the strait. The US stated that its blockade had intercepted 23 ships. Despite Iran's seizure of two cargo ships, Trump asserted total control over the strait. The Guardian described the situation as a "dual blockade", saying that while the US Navy could blockade Iranian ports, it had been unable to stop Iran's blockade and open the strait to allies.

Israel and Lebanon agreed a three-week extension of their ceasefire. On 7 June, Iran fired ballistic missiles at northern Israel in response to an Israeli strike near Beirut. The IDF responded by striking air defenses and a petrochemical plant in Iran, leading to a retaliatory Iranian attack on Haifa. Two Iranian soldiers were killed in an Israeli attack. A day later, Iran said it had ceased military actions against Israel. Israel stopped strikes at Trump's request.

On 9 June, The New York Times reported that American crew was rescued after a helicopter went down near the strait. CENTCOM said they were rescued by a US Navy drone boat for the first time. Trump said Iranians had shot down the helicopter and pledged to respond. A US official said a Shahed one-way attack drone downed the helicopter. Iran said it did not deliberately target the helicopter. CENTCOM later said that it launched "self-defense" strikes in retaliation. One attack damaged water reservoir tanks in Sirik; Iran stated that 20,000 people had lost access to drinking water.

On 14 June, Iran said that the draft US deal included Tehran agreeing not to produce or acquire nuclear weapons, and the US agreeing to allow Tehran to dilute its highly enriched uranium stockpile in Iran. Trump and Iran announced they had reached an agreement to end the war and reopen the strait. Trump said he had authorized the lifting of the US blockade. On 15 June, US vice president JD Vance announced that the memorandum was digitally signed by both countries the previous day. On 17 June, Trump and Iranian president Masoud Pezeshkian signed the Islamabad Memorandum to end the war, with Trump signing it during dinner with French president Emmanuel Macron at the Palace of Versailles after the G7 summit.

On 18 June, Pakistan stated that the signing of the memorandum implies Tehran will reopen the Strait of Hormuz "instantly" and the American blockade will end "immediately". CENTCOM announced that it had removed the naval blockade. On 19 June, Trump announced a renewed ceasefire between Israel and Hezbollah in the 2026 Lebanon war, facilitated by the US, Qatar, and Iran. However, on 20 June, Hezbollah announced an attack on Israeli forces trying to capture Ali al-Taher in Nabatieh, while Israel continued to strike southern Lebanon.

=== Collapse of the June ceasefire (July) ===
Army Pvt. Isabella Gonzalez, 19, who was killed during the attack on Muwaffaq Salti Air Base on 17 July.

The ceasefire collapsed on 8 July 2026, after a brief period of reduced tension under a 14-point memorandum of understanding (MoU) signed on 14 June 2026. Trump declared the agreement "over" after Iran attacked three commercial vessels passing through the Strait of Hormuz.

The United States Central Command retaliated by launching airstrikes against 80 targets throughout Iran, including Darkhovin Nuclear Power Plant. Following that, the Islamic Revolutionary Guard Corps carried out 85 counterattacks against US and allied military installations throughout the region, including those in Bahrain and Kuwait. Three US service members—1st Lt. Tyler James Feehan, Pvt. Isabella Gonzales, and Sgt. Angel S. Rampersad—were killed in one of those attacks on Muwaffaq Salti Air Base in Jordan that housed US personnel. The US then reinstated its naval blockade of Iranian ports and withdrew its temporary sanctions waivers.

=== Military lull (August) ===
Active hostilities slowed in August 2026, when the formal 60-day deadline set by the June MoU officially expired. The Strait of Hormuz remained disrupted during this period and mediators Oman and Qatar were involved in backdoor diplomacy, slowing world energy shipping to a fraction of its pre-war volume.

=== Renewed hostilities (September 2026–present) ===
In early September 2026, the US and Iran resumed trading attacks.

On 22 September, indirect "shuttle talks" between Iranian foreign minister Abbas Araghchi and US envoys Jared Kushner and Steve Witkoff through international mediators briefly resumed on the sidelines of the United Nations General Assembly in New York City. Iran reiterated its demands for permanent peace through communications sent through a Qatari mediator, including the complete lifting of the naval blockade, the immediate release of frozen Iranian financial assets, the end of the war on all fronts, and the halt to US military actions.

On 26 September, Trump rejected Iran's seven-day ceasefire proposal and expressed doubt that Tehran would eventually comply with his administration's nuclear demands.

The US military started sending about 9,000 soldiers to the Middle East on naval ships, such as the USS Makin Island amphibious readiness group and the USS Theodore Roosevelt carrier strike group, on 1 October.

As worries about Iranian retaliation grew, the US military sent two more Patriot missile batteries to Saudi Arabia and Qatar in September 2026 to safeguard vital energy infrastructure. A vital Saudi oil facility was protected by one battery, and a natural gas facility in Qatar was protected by the other.

On 4 October, the U.S. military evacuated twelve B-1 bombers from RAF Fairford airbase in the UK due to intelligence indicating a possible Iranian drone attack. The evacuation occurred shortly after British security forces arrested several individuals suspected of planning an attack, although it's unclear if they were connected to the drone threat.

The Strait of Hormuz maritime conflict intensified significantly in late September and early October. At least 12 attacks by the IRGC on oil, liquefied natural gas (LNG), and liquefied petroleum gas (LPG) tankers traveling through the strait were documented between 28 September and 5 October. This was the highest number of shipping attacks in a single week since the start of the war, according to maritime security tracking sources. Alongside the IRGC's increase in hostilities, which included drone overflights and vessel encounters, Gulf producers pushed for a return to pre-war levels of oil exports.

On 6 October, Qatar confirmed that negotiations between the US and Iran were occurring, with Doha and regional partners acting as intermediaries. After safely evacuating its crew, US forces destroyed an Iranian-affiliated dhow in the Gulf of Oman. CENTCOM reported on 14 October that the vessel had been targeting US Navy ships and conducting surveillance.

On 8 October, Trump announced that the US military will not resume military strikes on Iran before the 3 November midterm elections, mentioning "productive discussions" with Iran.

An IRGC projectile struck the Panamanian-flagged crude oil tanker Gem No. 2 off the coast of the UAE on 9 October. The UAE was forced to close beaches and stop fishing in Umm Al Quwain, Ras Al Khaimah, and Sharjah due to structural damage that resulted in a hydrocarbon leak that quadrupled in size to cover over 750 square kilometers (290 sq mi), a leak that was only contained on 30 October.

Admiral Brad Cooper, the commander of CENTCOM, declared on 16 October, that a US naval blockade had stopped Iran from exporting $25 billion worth of crude oil, severely straining the IRGC's finances and interfering with salary payments to its regional proxies. Cooper added that CENTCOM and the US Department of Treasury had worked together to freeze about $350 million in Iranian cryptocurrency holdings.

Iran targeted at least 12 commercial ships near the Strait of Hormuz from 11 to 16 October.

The Iranian government was accused by US Secretary of State Marco Rubio on 20 October, of using World War II era U-boat tactics. Rubio stated that this was the first time a nation-state had openly targeted civilian sailors and commercial vessels since 1945. Rubio reaffirmed Washington's commitment to applying "extraordinary economic pressure" to prevent Tehran from funding regional proxies.

According to an 23 October memo to Secretary of State Marco Rubio obtained by Axios, Iranian assassination plots against United States' officials have reached "advanced stages".

CENTCOM reported on 25 October, that since June 2026, the US Navy had successfully circumvented the IRGC's maritime blockade by escorting over 1.5 billion barrels of crude oil through the Strait of Hormuz.

Iran rejected a new peace plan put forth by Qatari mediators on 28 October, saying that it was unacceptable and reiterating that its nuclear policy was unchangeable. In an attempt to resume peace talks, US Vice President J. D. Vance sent a letter to Secretary of Iran's Supreme National Security Council Mohsen Rezaei that same day at Trump's directive.

On 29 October, two limpet mines attached to the hull of a small craft disabled the Panamanian-flagged crude oil tanker Louise 1, which was manned by 27 Indian seafarers, 25 nautical miles northeast of Khasab, Oman. After an unsuccessful attempt using unexploded devices in September, the strike was the first successful use of adhesive limpet explosives in the Strait of Hormuz since the war began. The explosions caused an engine room fire but did not result in any casualties or oil leaks.

On 31 October, Iranian Foreign Minister Abbas Araghchi called US Vice President J.D. Vance's letter a "positive step" toward possible talks, while Mohsen Rezaei cautioned that nuclear talks and the reopening of Hormuz remain dependent on the United States satisfying Iran's demands.

On 2 November, small-scale strikes were carried out by the US against Iranian positions on Qeshm Island in the Strait of Hormuz. According to a US official, who framed the strikes as "defensive", the operation was directed at Iranians who were using surface-to-air missiles against American aircraft. The next day, diplomatic attempts to end the conflict came to a standstill, when Mohsen Rezaei publicly rejected a US counterproposal. Rezaei described the US response as "not convincing," stating that until Washington met Iran's seven foundational demands, including lifting the naval blockade and paying war reparations, the Strait of Hormuz would remain closed to adversarial shipping.

Iranian state media reported two missile strikes near Suza on Qeshm Island in the Strait of Hormuz on 6 November, while Trump declared that US forces had carried out "minor" strikes against an Iranian air defense system.

On 7 November, the IRGC declared that it lifted a self-proclaimed restriction of 2,000 km (1,200 mi) in the range of its ballistic missiles. CENTCOM expanded its interdiction efforts beyond its existing naval blockade by establishing Task Force Iron Gate under Admiral Brad Cooper to obstruct what it described as illicit Iranian shipments and weapons transit across land borders and the Caspian Sea. Iranian state media claimed that US forces fired projectiles at Qeshm Island in the Strait of Hormuz overnight on 8–9 November. However, deputy governor of Hormozgan province Ahmad Nafisi said that the strikes were outside of residential and commercial areas and did not damage any critical infrastructure.

On 10 November, Iranian state media reported that the IRGC had attacked navigation systems on Oman's Didamar Island in the Strait of Hormuz, claiming that the equipment was being used to facilitate oil smuggling by Iran's adversaries. The announcement came amid a series of US strikes on Qeshm Island in recent weeks. On 11 November, Reuters reported, citing three sources familiar with the matter, that Iranian forces had attacked maritime navigation systems on Didamar, although it could not independently verify whether the equipment had been damaged.

Following US aircraft relocations from RAF Mildenhall and RAF Fairford in the United Kingdom due to Iranian security threats, Mohsen Rezaei warned in an interview with Al Mayadeen on 11 November, that Iran would strike US military bases in Europe and other distant regions if they were used as launch points for renewed attacks against the country.

An "enemy" attack on Bandar Sirik was reported by the Islamic Republic News Agency on 12 November. The next day, the IRGC claimed to have destroyed a US early-warning radar in Bahrain in retaliation for an air strike against a telecommunications tower in Sirik. CENTCOM denied any damage and claimed that US forces had intercepted two IRGC drones.

By mid-November 2026, commercial shipping through the Strait of Hormuz remained roughly 65 percent below pre-war levels, with 136 maritime security incidents recorded in the region since the conflict began. US intelligence detected potential Iranian plans for dirty bomb or chemical attacks against senior Trump administration officials in Washington, D.C., prompting the relocation of Treasury Secretary Scott Bessent to military housing. Although U.S. officials questioned Iran's capability to carry out the attacks, the White House stated there were "no credible threats to the homeland," and Iran dismissed the allegation.

On 15 November, the IRGC reported a six-drone strike on a US air defense radar at Riffa Air Base. Following two public shelter-in-place alerts, the Bahrain Defence Force intercepted multiple incoming Iranian aerial attacks, its first since September. The Iranian Army Air Defence also reported the shoot down of an Israeli Orbiter 4 drone over Nahavand on the same day.

In the Strait of Hormuz off Khasab, Oman, on 16 November, the Panamanian-flagged liquefied petroleum gas tanker MT Tara Gas was hit and set on fire. Two of the 24 Indian crew members on board were hospitalized and one went missing.

On 17 November, the IRGC conducted a third drone attack on a US radar installation in Bahrain in retaliation for alleged US airspace violations, ending a two-month lull in strikes against Persian Gulf targets. Hours after the attack, there were reports of smoke and explosions on Qeshm Island. US forces then carried out attacks on Qeshm Island without causing casualties or damage.

On 18 November, Kuwaiti air defenses engaged and intercepted drone attacks in national airspace, alerting locals to interception blasts. A second round of Iranian aerial attacks was intercepted by Bahrain's air defenses. The Islamic Republic of Iran Army claimed responsibility for launching drones at US missile and drone installations at Ali Al Salem Air Base in Kuwait.

On 21 November, Bahrain reported that an Iranian strike caused a fire at a civilian industrial facility without casualties. Later that day, the IRGC launched a combined missile and drone attack on US positions in Riffa and Awali in retaliation for alleged US violations of Iranian airspace, though Bahraini air defenses intercepted most of the projectiles, resulting in minor shrapnel damage. Bahrain's Interior Ministry confirmed that the attacks injured two people, leaving one in critical condition.

== Casualties and damages ==
The aftermath of US-Israeli airstrikes in Tehran, 6 March 2026

The US and Israel killed many Iranian commanders and leaders on the war's first day by leading Iran to believe that strikes were not imminent. Thus, groups of senior Iranian officials continued gathering in person. These gatherings were targeted in initial strikes. One part of the deception was information about a US F-22 deployment leaked to hide that preparations were more advanced at other bases. Calls between Trump and Netanyahu before the war were not made public to reduce the risk of an Iranian first strike.

IDF spokesperson Effie Defrin stated that months of joint US and Israeli "strategic and operational deception" of satellite imagery led up to the war. This encompassed planes and other facilities. The night of the initial strike he and IDF chief of staff Eyal Zamir took their official cars home from IDF Headquarters. They came back without them so that satellite imagery would show that their base did not appear full nor warplanes appear armed and ready. Three separate gatherings of Iranian officials were hit within half a minute of each other in the opening strike. War sources revealed that the American-Israeli strikes targeted IRGC bases, border guard posts, and other security facilities to attempt to allow for potential ground incursions from both Kurdish separatists to the northwest and Baloch separatists to the southeast. There were no reports of cross-border operations from either of the ethnic militant groups, although Iran had engaged in attacks against both of them, reportedly killing both Kurdish fighters of the Coalition of Political Forces of Iranian Kurdistan and Baloch fighters of the People's Fighters Front originating from outside Iran.

Analysis of satellite images by The Washington Post revealed damage to at least 228 structures or pieces of equipment at US bases across the Persian Gulf, far more than the Trump administration has admitted to. On 1 March, six US soldiers were killed amid more than 30 injured in an Iranian drone attack near Camp Arifjan in Port Shuaiba, Kuwait. Those killed were soldiers of the United States Army Reserve assigned to the 103rd Expeditionary Sustainment Command, headquartered in Des Moines, Iowa. On 8 March, CENTCOM reported that a National Guard soldier died during a medical emergency. A soldier of the 1st Space Brigade was wounded in an attack against Prince Sultan Air Base on 1 March and died from his injuries on 9 March.

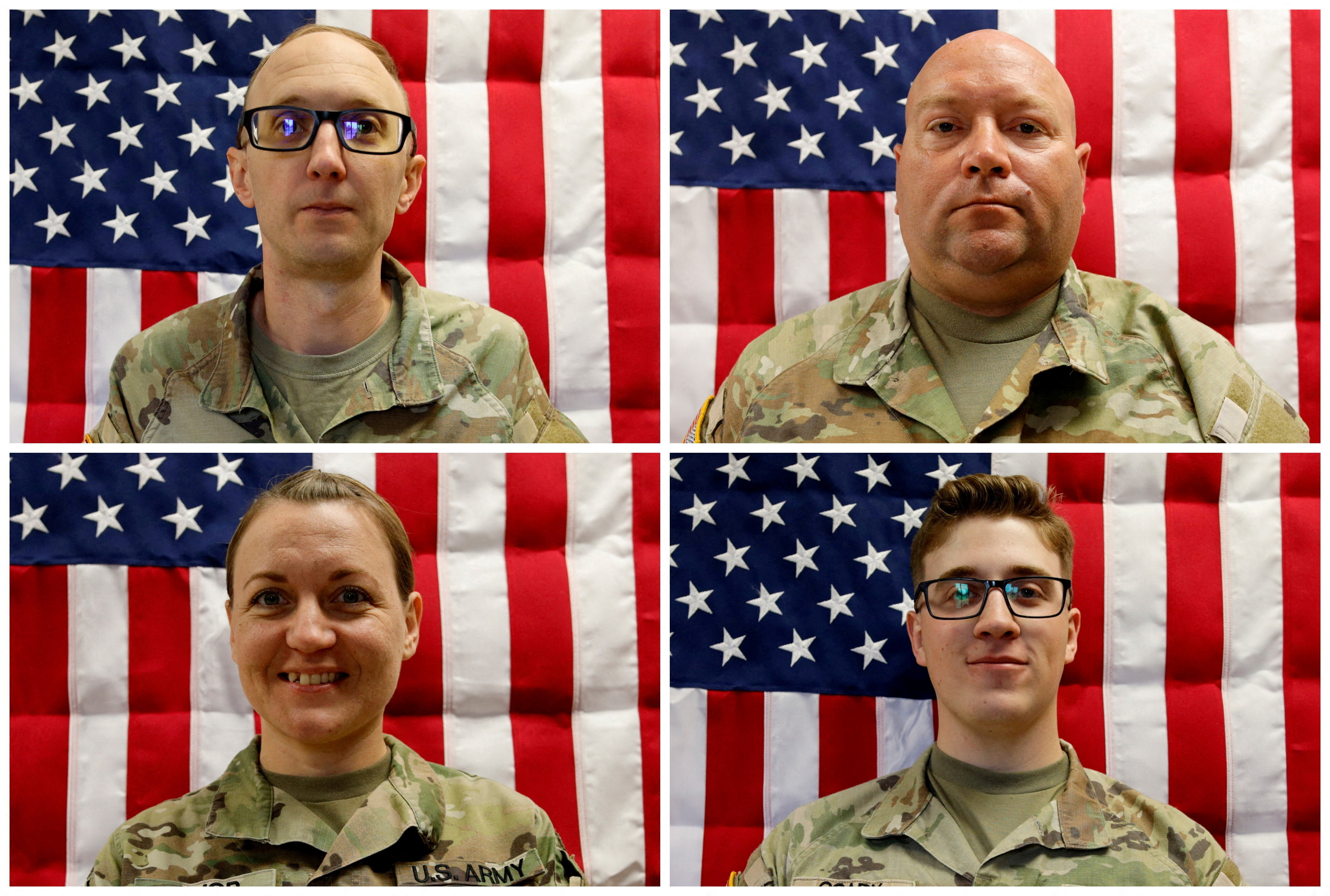
The first four US soldiers killed during the war: Capt. Cody Khork of Winter Haven, Florida; Sgt. 1st Class Noah Tietjens of Bellevue, Nebraska; Sgt. 1st Class Nicole Amor of White Bear Lake, Minnesota; and Sgt. Declan Coady of West Des Moines, Iowa

According to a May report by the Congressional Research Service, 42 U.S. military aircraft were destroyed or damaged during the Iran-U.S. conflict. Data from the Center for Strategic and International Studies (CSIS) indicates that about 65 percent of the 2,330 US Patriot interceptor missiles available at the beginning of the conflict with Iran were used between February and July, leaving less than 850 missiles remaining.

In a report in October 2026, the U.S. Congressional Research Service announced that since the start of the U.S. military offensive against Iran on 28 February 2026, a total of 81 U.S. fixed-wing aircraft, helicopters, and drones have been lost or damaged.

Senator Chris Murphy reported being blocked by the Pentagon from visiting a major US base in Qatar. He described the damage he saw at the US embassy in Saudi Arabia as "extraordinary" and far worse than reported, warning that an Iranian drone attack could have resulted in numerous American deaths had it occurred during the day. He criticized the Pentagon for attempting to keep Congress unaware of the war's costs, accusing Defense Secretary Pete Hegseth of hiding information from the public.

In October 2026, MeidasTouch, citing American military personnel and their families, reported that the damage from Iranian attacks on US bases was much more extensive than the Pentagon had announced, and that the Pentagon had concealed this information from the American people. "It's so much worse than people realize," The sources told the outlet that they had been threatened with disciplinary action if they disclosed information. The photos and videos published by this media outlet also show damage to US military installations in Saudi Arabia, Jordan, Kuwait, the United Arab Emirates, and Bahrain. According to the Associated Press, Iran's attacks on US bases in the Middle East focused on expensive early warning systems in order to clear the way for further attacks on aircraft and buildings, causing billions of dollars in damage to this equipment. Raphael Cohen, national security director at RAND Corporation, pointed out that while strikes against Iran were much heavier, modern war dynamics make all militaries vulnerable to "large-scale, cheap drone attacks," making the United States' reliance on legacy, fixed regional infrastructure unsustainable.

In October 2026, the Pentagon revised its casualty figures for the conflict with Iran, acknowledging a total of 21 fatalities and 865 injuries. This update follows prior assessments that had understated the death toll. In late October, the Pentagon officially acknowledged 23 U.S. military fatalities.

According to a report by the Wall Street Journal on October 30, 2026, the newspaper examined tens of thousands of satellite images, NASA data and other sources and found that 274 structures at 24 US military installations across the Middle East were damaged in the first six months of the war.

Since the start of the US-Israeli war on Iran, at least 25 seafarers had been killed in the vicinity of the Strait of Hormuz by 11 November, according to the UN.

== Direct impacts ==
=== United States ===
==== Reserves ====
The United States' Strategic Petroleum Reserve has dropped to its lowest level in four decades, with possibility of permanent damage to the caverns if the withdrawals continue.

==== Military ====
According to military historian Max Boot, the war calls into question the long-standing foundation of U.S. military strategy of reliance on bases within the enemy's strike range, with the assumption that the U.S. air superiority would keep them safe.

Early attacks on US bases caused logistics issues in the US aircraft carrier USS Abraham Lincoln.

On October 30, The Wall Street Journal reported that the United States was negotiating with allied countries to share the costs of repairing military installations damaged by Iranian attacks during the war. It identified damage to 274 structures at 24 military installations in the Middle East. U.S. officials estimated the damage at a minimum of $5 billion, while a separate estimate put the figure as high as $15 billion. These costs were not included in the Pentagon's $47.1 billion estimate for the war through October 16. The US Congress had been informed by the Department of Defense in November 2026 that the war had cost at least $48.3 billion.

===== Munition shortage =====
The war exposed shortages in the US' weapons stockpiles, calling into question years of defense investment after the September 11 attacks. After less than five months of the war, US was already running out of ammunition against a middle-tier adversary. This could limit US ability to deter other adversaries, including Russia and China. Former secretary of defense Leon Panetta described this as a "dangerous moment". The US no longer has the capacity to deter a future conflict in the South China Sea and elsewhere.

The United States consumed more than half of its Patriot missiles used to intercept Iranian missiles and drones. The stockpiles limitation has reportedly turned into a key determinant for continuation or expansion of the conflict. (Note: Since late 2023, the US military has deployed reserves across multiple fronts, including countering Houthi attacks in the Red Sea, defending Israel from Iranian missiles, assisting Ukraine, and protecting US troops in the Middle East. This extensive deployment has led to rapid consumption of advanced interceptor missiles, raising concerns among experts about the ability of defense companies to replenish stocks. Replacing critical munitions will take time, as will increasing supplies for potential future conflicts, such as with China in the Taiwan Strait.) As of 5 August 2026, the US had reportedly used roughly 80% of its THAAD missiles in the war.

The United States burned through "virtually all" of its PrSM and ATACMS munitions, and "a little less than half" of its global Tomahawk supply, according to a Reuters report on 4 August.

On 6 August, Trump and Hegseth clashed at Camp David over "extreme missile shortages", according to Washington Post. Trump said he felt misled while Hegseth put the blame on his deputy, Stephen Feinberg. Trump denied the aforementioned report, and threatened long prison sentences for anyone leaking information about military supplies. As of 14 August, the US had reportedly lost around 25% of their Reaper drones in the war. The Trump administration took the unusual step of subjecting approximately 50 members of the US military's Joint Chiefs of Staff to polygraph tests over leaks to journalists, including information about how the war has resulted in a shortage of critical munitions.

The Pentagon has transferred weapons stored in Asia and Europe to replenish stockpiles in the Middle East. Still, missile interceptors shortage reportedly persuaded Trump to call off a planned major attack on Iran. The Trump administration blames the shortage on Joe Biden giving too many weapons to Ukraine.

On 17 September, Lockheed Martin received the first batch of Patriot interceptor parts from General Motors less than a month after the two companies signed a manufacturing agreement, in a success for the Pentagon's push for faster weapon production, particularly the Patriot missile defense system, as it remained one of the world's most sought-after weapons for the war and Russia's war in Ukraine.

Acting US Navy Secretary Hung Cao said during his Senate confirmation hearing on November 18, 2026, that the United States had used expired Tomahawk missiles in the Middle East due to a shortage of ammunition.

==== Allegations of war crimes ====
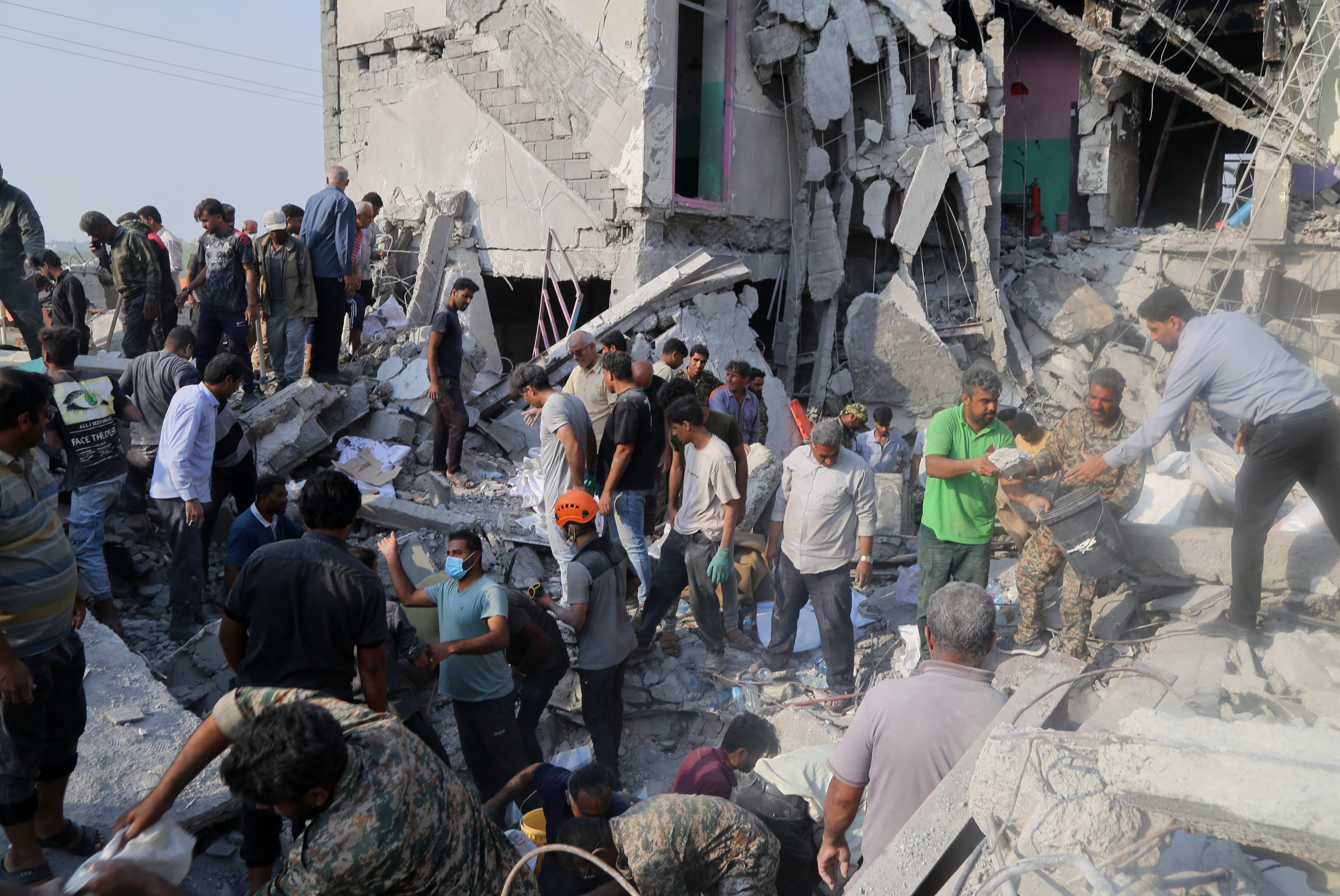
Rescuers and residents searching through the rubble of the Minab girls' elementary school, destroyed by the United States

In September 2026, a UN-commissioned fact-finding mission panel found "reasonable grounds" to believe that the United States had committed war crimes during military strikes in Iran during the 2026 Iran war. The report highlighted two 28 February strikes that killed at least 178 civilians.

U.S. president Donald Trump's threats to completely destroy Iranian power plants and other essential infrastructure during the 2026 Iran war have been widely condemned by human rights organizations, legal experts, and lawmakers as potential war crimes.

The report published by the Independent International Fact-Finding Mission on Iran detailed two specific U.S. military operations on the first day of the 2026 Iran war that it determined constituted indiscriminate attacks on civilian infrastructure, the Minab School Bombing, where a U.S. Tomahawk missile strike targeted the Shajareh Tayyebeh Primary School in the southern city of Minab. The attack killed more than 150 people, including approximately 120 children. The UN mission concluded that the school was the intended point of impact rather than collateral damage, as well as the Lamerd Sports Complex Strike, where a separate U.S. airstrike utilized precision strike missiles to disperse tungsten pellets over a clearly identifiable sports complex and residential area in Lamerd. The attack resulted in the deaths of 22 civilian men and women.

The Trump administration firmly rejected the allegations. White House spokeswoman Anna Kelly dismissed the findings as "unserious nonsense", stating that the U.S. does not give credibility to the report, and maintained that the Iranian regime is the only party committing war crimes in the conflict. The U.S. Central Command (CENTCOM) previously denied responsibility for the strike in Lamerd and stated it was investigating the incident in Minab.

==== Political ====
Under the legislative leadership of Republican House speaker Mike Johnson, Trump had previously not gained congressional approval for the war in Iran, bringing into question Johnson's abdication of powers under his responsibility to Trump. In May 2026, Johnson deliberately canceled a voting session on ending the war, drawing backlash among Democratic politicians and analysts.

In the November 2026 midterm elections, the Democratic Party won a majority in congress in both the Senate and the House of Representatives, as well as flipping six Republican-held state governorships, giving them a majority of governorships for the first time since 2010. In the House of Representatives elections, Democrats won 56% of the vote and Republicans 42%, the largest House victory since 1974. The scale of the Democratic victory was widely dubbed a "blue tsunami". The economy and the Iran war were cited in public polling as the main factors behind the result, as well as healthcare and the state of democracy.

According to political and policy experts such as the Brookings Institution's William Galston, the administration's unauthorized war ultimately cost them control of Congress. Driven by massive military spending, rising energy costs, and domestic inflation, the conflict had severely damaged Donald Trump's approval ratings and drove a significant number of 2024 Republican voters to defect to the Democrats. The BBC cited a poll in which 63% said the US had made the wrong decision to start the war, and the NBC exit poll that found the war was a crucial or major factor for 74% of voters. Reuters noted that Trump had campaigned in 2024 on a promise of not starting any new wars, and the BBC stated many Republicans saw the war as a broken promise.

=== Iran ===
==== Leadership ====
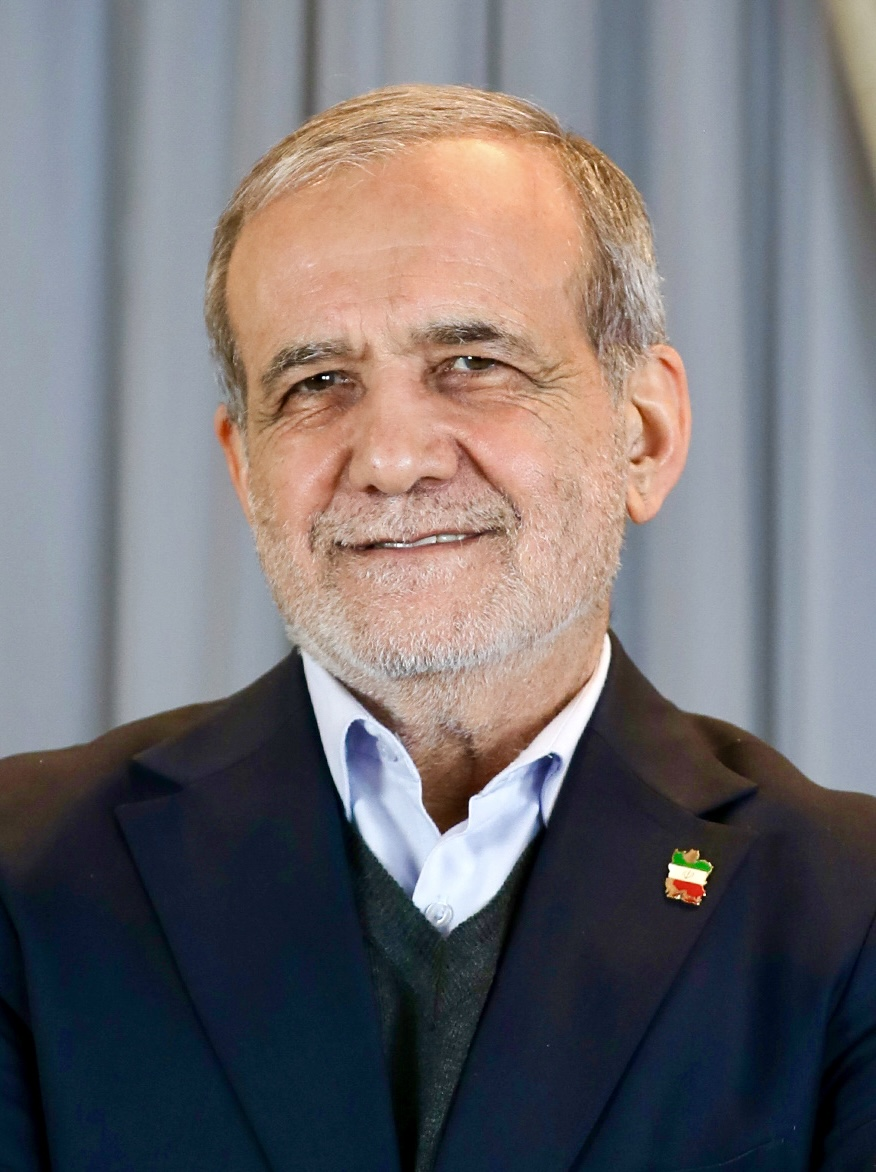
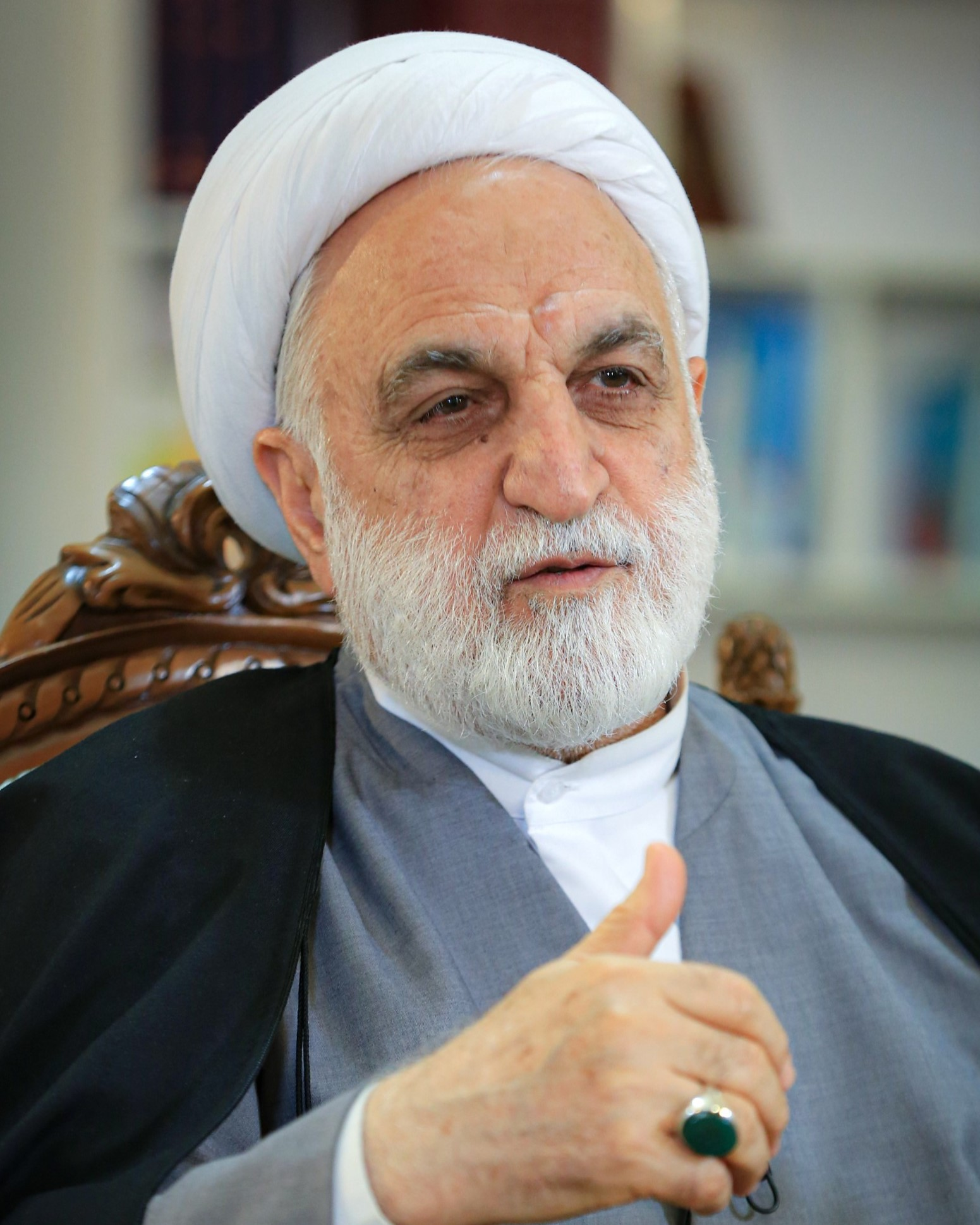
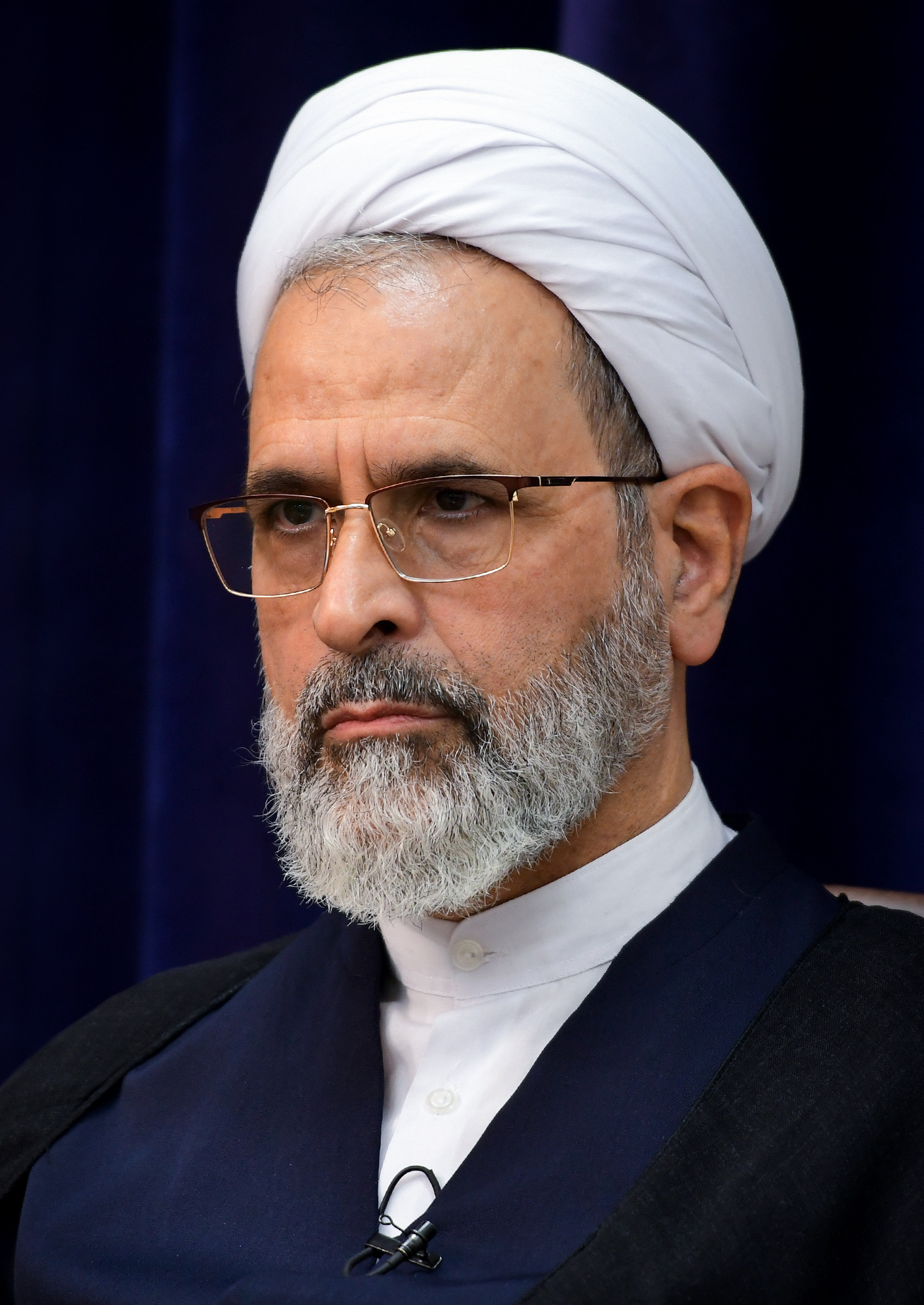
The three members of the Interim Leadership Council – President Masoud Pezeshkian, Chief Justice Gholam-Hossein Mohseni-Eje'i and Ayatollah Alireza Arafi

The death of Ali Khamenei triggered an election for a new supreme leader. Under the terms of Iran's constitution, the Interim Leadership Council was established on 1 March to exercise the functions of Iran's head of state until a new supreme leader is elected.

Mojtaba Khamenei was elected on 8 March 2026 to replace his father as supreme leader, and the IRGC, as well as Iran's top leaders, including Mohammad Bagher Ghalibaf, Ali Larijani, and Masoud Pezeshkian, pledged their allegiance to him.

In late March, the NYT described Iran's leadership as paralyzed with severely disrupted decision-making process. It also reported that the damage to communications infrastructure caused paranoia and internal power struggles.

As of 21 May, Khamenei remains in hiding and the de facto ruler is uncertain. The IRGC is currently under command of the hardliner general Ahmad Vahidi, who is cited as the formulator of Iran's military and negotiation stance. The Telegraph has revealed a shadowy partnership with the retired IRGC commander-in-chief Mohammad Ali Jafari.

==== Civilian life ====
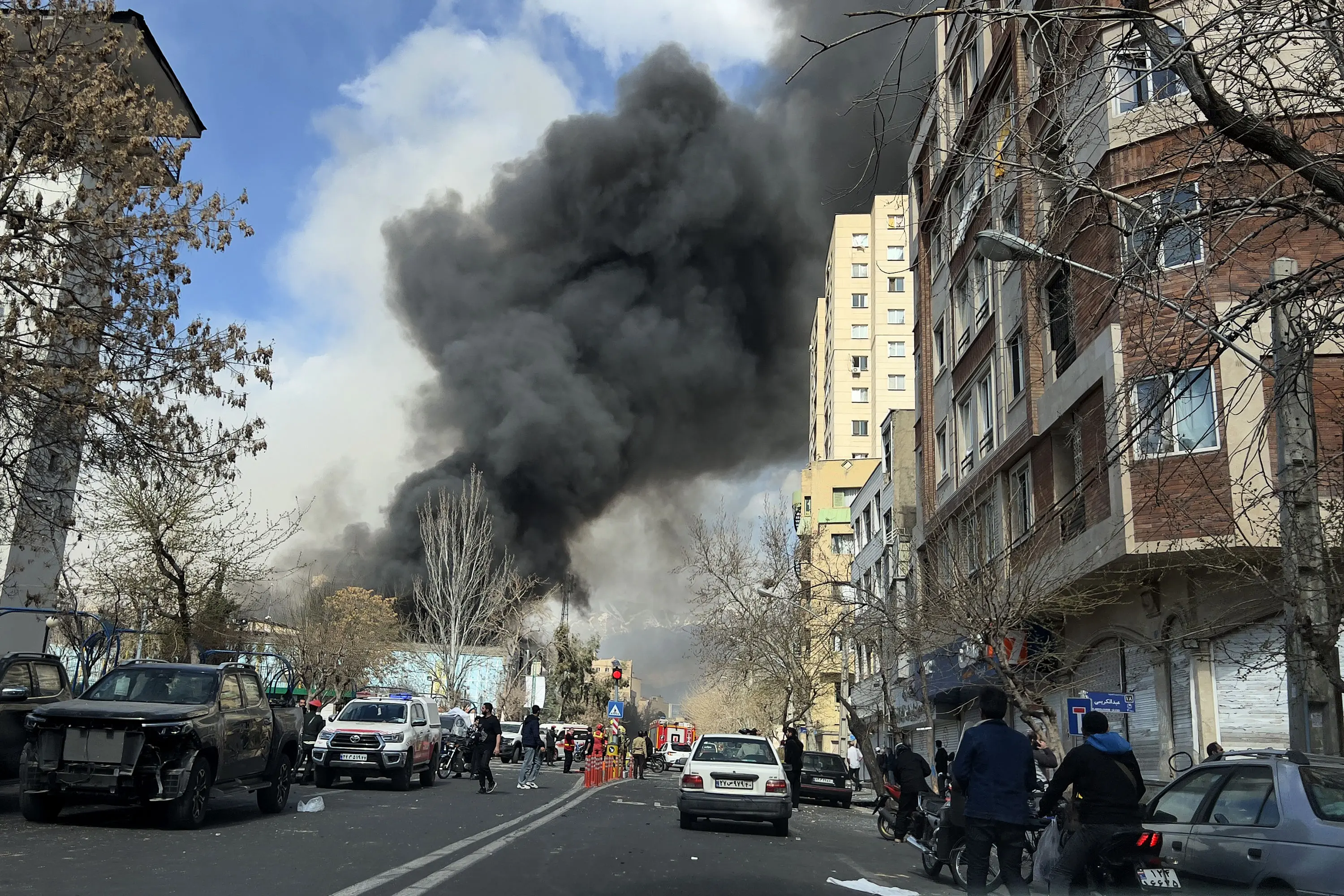
Residents in Tehran on the third day of US-Israeli airstrikes, 3 March 2026

According to UN Human Rights Chief Volker Türk, the "reckless" war disproportionately impacted civilians in the Middle East and beyond. By April 2026, 138,000 civilian sites in Iran had been damaged during the conflict, with reconstruction estimated to take two to five years.

As the US and Israel executed joint strikes targeting Iranian military and institutional targets, Iran's capital reportedly became a ghost town, as civilians feared going outside or to their daily jobs. Reports have emerged that prisoners in Evin Prison have been receiving limited bread and water since the onset of the war. After the strikes, schools were ordered closed while banks and government offices remained in operation at reduced capacity. Local media reported that subway and bus services would remain operational.

During the "near total" internet blackout in Iran, NetBlocks reported that internet connectivity dropped to 4% of ordinary levels. As the internet blackout exceeded 240 hours, making it the second longest ever, the government started handing out "white sim cards", which bypass filters, to government supporters, to allow them to promote its messaging. As news of Khamenei's death broke, security forces were deployed to prevent an uprising, with footage showing them opening fire on celebrants in the streets and shooting at people chanting behind the windows of their homes.

During the first two weeks of March 2026, over 70,000 Afghan refugees returned to Afghanistan, frequently under forced circumstances, exacerbating the country's severe humanitarian crisis. Arafat Jamal, the UNHCR Representative in Afghanistan, noted that they faced limited options amid the military confrontations between Afghanistan and Pakistan.

According to The Guardian, the war has overshadowed the executions of political prisoners in Iran, including those involved in the mass protests of January 2026, allowing Iran to continue carrying out death sentences and other severe punishments with little international scrutiny. According to several Iran-focused human rights groups, the rate of sentencing and executions by hanging surged amidst the war. The groups state that in most of these cases, executed prisoners did not receive due process.

==== Military ====
On 26 March, it was reported that children as young as 12 years of age may join Iran's war support, leading to concerns of the use of child soldiers. Days later, rights groups stated an 11-year-old was killed while on duty at a Tehran checkpoint.

On 29 March, footage showed Iraq's Popular Mobilization Forces deployed in Iran.

A leaked US intelligence report concluded in May that Iran retained 70% of missile and launchers relative to pre-war status.

Iran has become more skilled as the war progressed, learning how to evade American air defenses. Iran managed to extend the conflict to include most of the Middle East and enlisted allied militia in Iraq and Yemen.

==== Cultural heritage sites ====
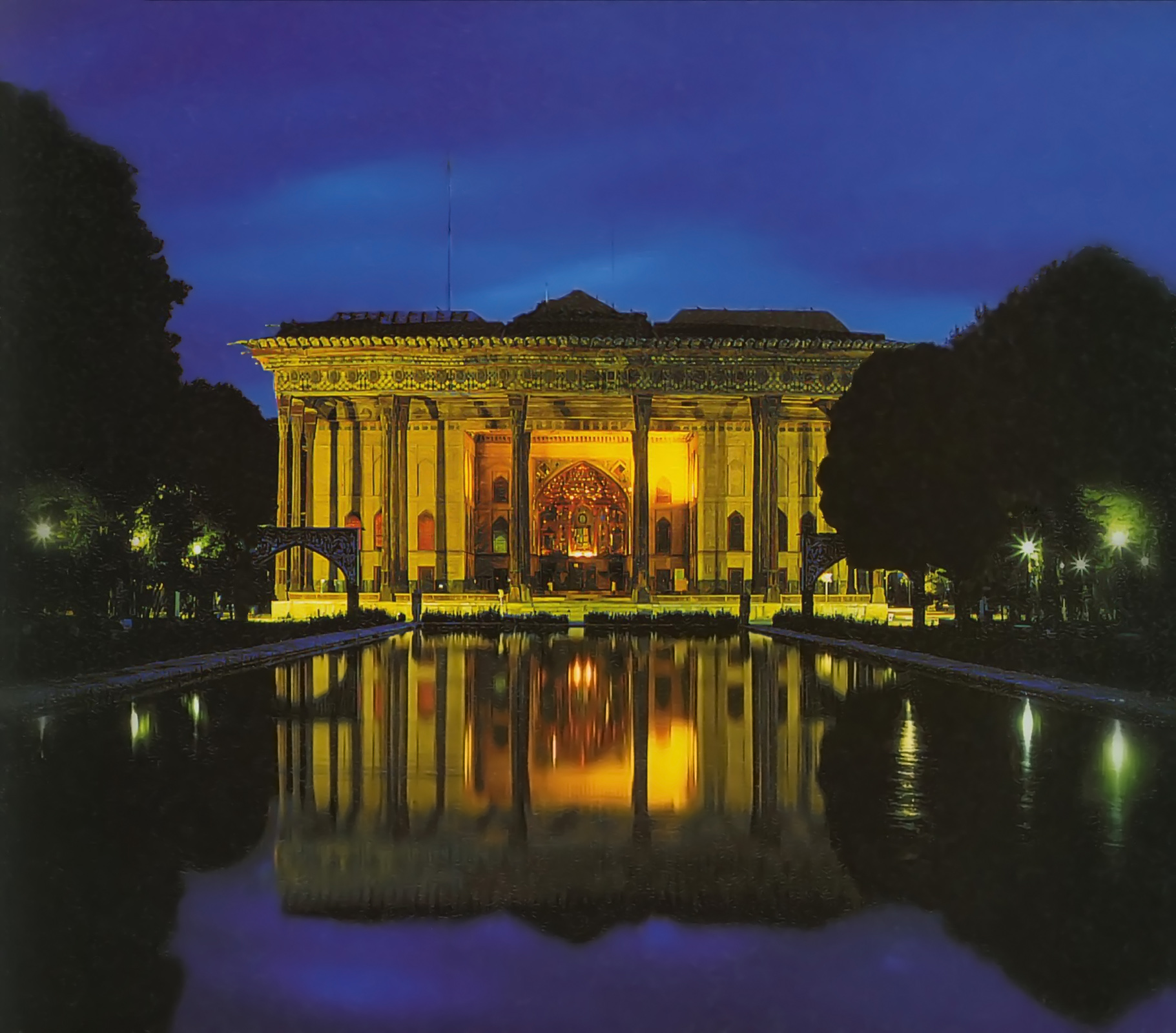
Chehel Sotoun palace and its rich ayeneh-kari decorations was assessed to be the most affected.

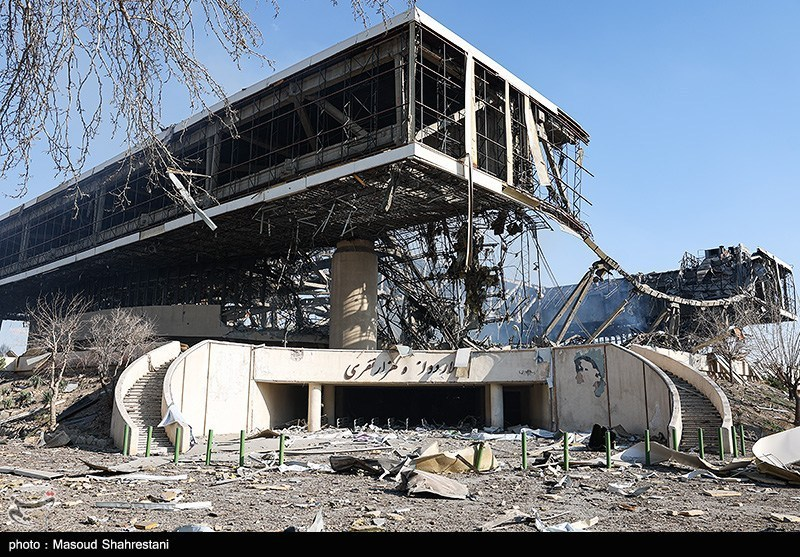
The aftermath of bombing of the Azadi Indoor Stadium

Multiple historic and cultural sites, including UNESCO World Heritage Sites, were damaged. The most affected was Chehel Sotoun and its rich ayeneh-kari. On 2 March, a strike on Arg Square damaged nearby Golestan Palace, prompting UNESCO to issue a statement of concern. On 5 March, the Azadi Sport Complex was bombed. An 8 March strike on Falak-ol-Aflak, which was marked with a blue shield emblem, damaged several sections of the site. Strikes on Isfahan on 9 March damaged Naqsh-e Jahan Square, Chehel Sotoun, Ali Qapu, the Shah Mosque, Jameh Mosque, and Teymouri Hall.

On 11 March, UNESCO urged protection for Iran's heritage sites and World Heritage Sites that have been damaged or are under high risk due to the war, alongside other historic sites in Israel, Lebanon, and the rest of West Asia. On 17 March, blast waves and shrapnel damaged multiple palaces at Sa'dabad Complex in northern Tehran. Russia's Ministry of Foreign Affairs reported that strikes in Tehran on 1 April damaged the St. Nicholas Orthodox Church and its auxiliary buildings. On 7 April, the Rafi'-Nia synagogue was fully destroyed by the IAF.

=== Israel ===
Israel declared a nationwide state of emergency, saying that the strikes on Iran were the largest that it had ever launched. Israeli schools and workspaces were closed and public gatherings were canceled.

In the 40 days from the start of the war through the 8 April ceasefire, there were a total of 650 missile attacks from Iran to Israel, the majority of which carried cluster munitions. About 16 of the missiles that made it past Israeli missile defenses carried conventional warheads, while 50 had cluster munitions. The attacks killed a total of 24 people, all of them civilians, and resulted in more than 7,000 injuries. Of the 24 civilians killed, 14 were struck by conventional explosive warheads and 10 by cluster submunitions. Two of the deaths were inside a sheltered space, with the other fatalities being people in unprotected areas.

==== Political ====
After the publishing of the Islamabad Memorandum of Understanding, a 16–22 June poll by the Institute for National Security Studies (INSS) found that 40% of Israelis believed that Iran had won the war, 15% that Israel had won the war, and 43% that there had not been a decisive outcome. In October, The New York Times reported that Netanyahu was portraying the upcoming election in "increasingly apocalyptic" terms, including an AI-generated image of a nuclear mushroom cloud over Israel, and that he had pushed Israeli defense officials for an escalation in the war with Iran, which he later denied.

In the 2026 Israeli legislative election, the Netanyahu bloc lost its governing majority, while the opposition bloc led by Gadi Eisenkot failed to overtake its seat count and the Arab-majority parties almost doubled their seats, resulting in uncertainty regarding the formation of the next government. According to Raz Zimmt, director of the Iran program at the INSS, it was not clear whether the results of the Israeli election and the 2026 US midterms would alter Israel and the United States' approach in the Iran war.

=== Palestine ===
The Israeli Coordinator of Government Activities in the Territories (COGAT) closed multiple aid crossings in the Gaza Strip, specifically interrupting free circulation on the Egypt–Gaza border. Israeli forces suspended United Nations humanitarian movements and postponed planned rotations of international humanitarian staff, including medical evacuations and the return of people into Gaza, which the United Nations Office for the Coordination of Humanitarian Affairs condemned.

Israeli settler violence against Palestinians in occupied West Bank has increased; settlers have taken advantage of curbs on movement imposed during the renewed Israeli state of emergency. The renewed blocking of West Bank roads in the context of the 2026 Lebanon war has delayed medics from assisting injured Palestinians. The EU stated on 10 March that the Israeli actions were unacceptable and urged the Israeli authorities to make immediate efforts to prevent the violence against Palestinian civilians under international law, warning that "impunity for such acts risks provoking further violence".

=== Lebanese displacements ===
Lebanon stated in March that over one million people, one-sixth of the population, had been displaced.

=== Persian Gulf Arab states ===
The Arab states of the Persian Gulf started a campaign of prosecution against civilians and foreign citizens that shared or reposted rumors from unverified sources about the Iranian attacks, with the stated main goal to curb misinformation that could harm public order. Bahrain's Cyber Crime Directorate also started a campaign of arresting civilians in the country, which has a large Shiite minority, who allegedly expressed "their support for the Iranian shelling targeting the Kingdom of Bahrain", describing such activities as treason and as promotion of hostile acts against the state. Trump said "Even if we knew Gulf countries would be hit, big deal we did what we have to do".

Saudi Arabia invoked its Strategic Mutual Defence Agreement with Pakistan. Pakistan deployed some 8,000 troops, a squadron of 16 aircraft, and two squadrons of drones. There was a pledge to send more if required.

On 28 May, the US president Donald Trump threatened to "blow up" Oman if it failed to "behave" in a casual aside during a cabinet meeting after reports of talks between Iran and Oman about jointly charging a toll for ships passing through the Strait of Hormuz.

== Economic impacts ==
A map of emergency evacuation of persons to Europe

The war had global economic consequences: oil and gas prices surged, aviation and tourism were disrupted, and financial markets shuddered. The World Food Programme and analysts warned that disruptions to fertilizer supplies caused by the closure of the Strait of Hormuz could raise global food prices, threatening a scenario similar to the 2022 food crisis. In September 2026, daily charter rates for very large crude carriers (VLCCs) carrying up to 2 million barrels of crude from the Persian Gulf to China rose above $1.2 million, according to the Financial Times. The surge followed disruptions to oil shipping routes that forced tankers onto longer voyages and reduced the number of vessels available for hire, increasing freight costs and putting pressure on refiners' margins. During the summer of 2026, the conflict in the Middle East increased the European Union's gas import bill by an estimated €18–33 billion to the European Union's gas import bill for the same volume of gas, according to the European Union Agency for the Cooperation of Energy Regulators (ACER). This estimate varies depending on whether day-ahead or monthly Title Transfer Facility (TTF) prices are used. On 28 October, the Dutch TTF front-month natural gas futures contract briefly reached €100 per megawatt-hour—approximately three times its pre-war level—amid disruptions to liquefied natural gas (LNG) supplies ahead of winter.

International Energy Agency (IEA) head Fatih Birol described the situation as the "greatest global energy security challenge in history". The Iranian government's spokesperson, Fatemeh Mohajerani, estimated the direct and indirect cost of 40 days of war by $270 billion, or 90% of the estimated Iranian GDP in 2026. Citing Mohajerani, the Foundation for Defense of Democracies, a neoconservative think tank, estimates damages of up to $300 billion, with a middle estimation range of $144 billion.

According to the Center for American Progress, as of 14 July, Americans had paid more than $68 billion in extra costs for gas and diesel since the beginning of the war, in addition to the direct war costs. The U.S. war with Iran had cost the U.S. government approximately $40 billion by July. Defense Priorities's Middle East director Rosemary Kelanic pointed out that Trump continually jawboned oil markets to suppress oil prices by calling off his military threats in quick responses to negative financial reactions. In correlation with Trump's Truth Social posts, billions of dollars of oil contracts fell and stock markets rose in what appeared to be insider trading patterns; the United States Commodity Futures Trading Commission (CFTC) was later forced by the Trump administration to retract investigations into the trading patterns.

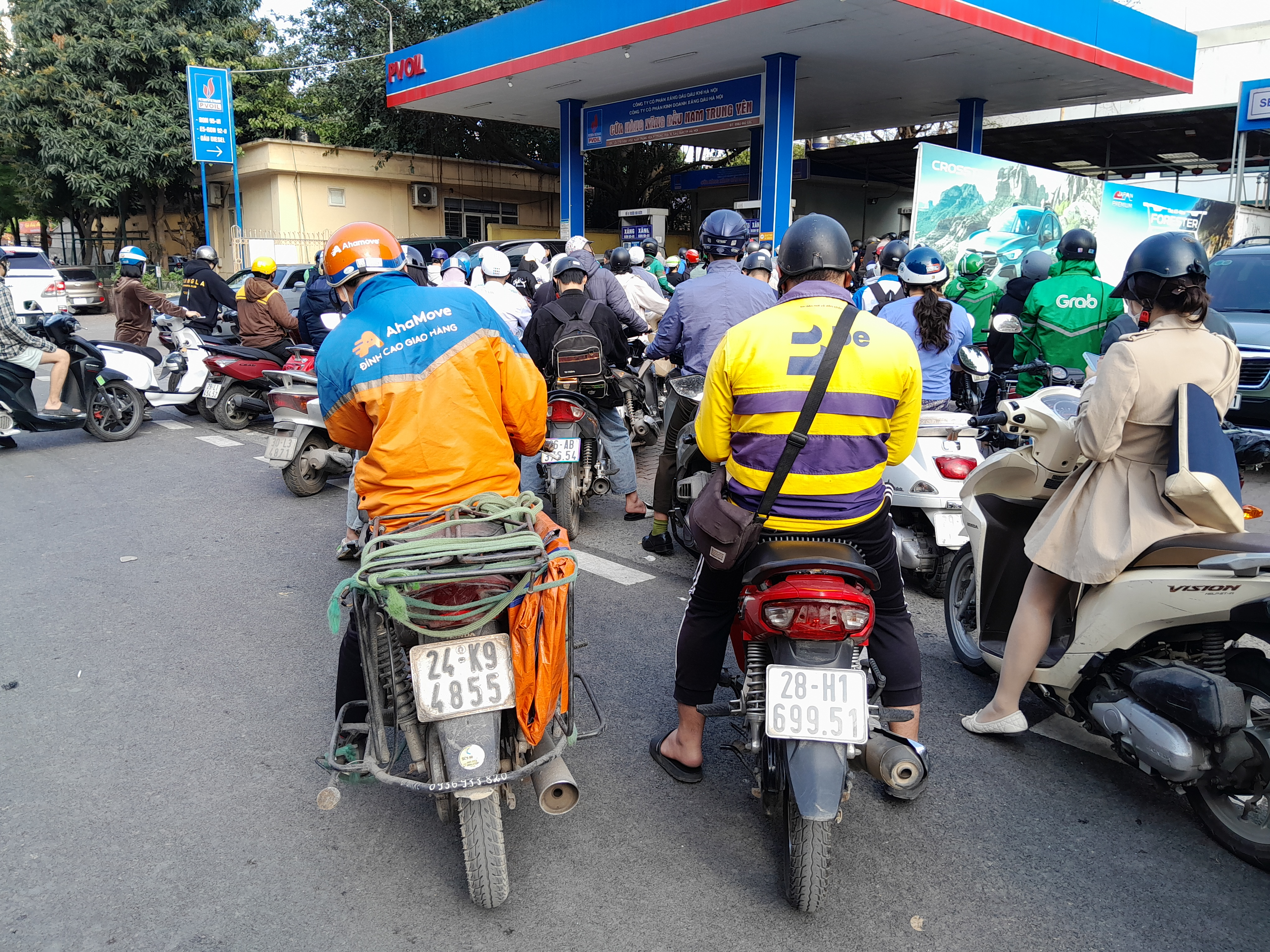
A queue of motorcyclists at a PV Oil petrol station in Hanoi, Vietnam on 10 March 2026.

Houthi-controlled Yemen threatened shipping in the Gulf of Aden and Red Sea. Its threats had been suspended since 10 October 2025. March threats by Houthi leader Abdul-Malik al-Houthi had not stopped Red Sea traffic as of mid-April, although traffic remained under historic levels after crashing in 2024 as a result of Houthi attacks. On 15 March, the Associated Press reported that the weapons stockpile of the Houthis was running low from repeated attacks on Israel, while Iran had not been able to resupply them, because of the war.

Three Amazon Web Services data centers in the United Arab Emirates were struck and damaged as a result of drone strikes, leading to outages of web infrastructure within the Middle East, causing "sparks and fire" as well as "major structural damage" for 2 of the centers, with internal water levels reaching up to 4 cm, worsened by the failure of cooling and air systems. Fundamental web infrastructure including S3 storage, EC2 compute and DynamoDB databases suffered complete outages in early March. Iran shut down Internet access for its people throughout the war.

In mid September, the US House of Representatives voted for a third time, to end the war, shortly after a CBO report warned the conflict had already cost at least $38 billion, was depleting defensive missile stockpiles to the point of a five-year rebuild, and would add roughly $3 billion per month while fueling inflation. According to a report by The Hill, the costs of the war with Iran had risen to $47 billion by late October 2026. Mark Zandi, an economist at Moody's Analytics, estimates that the war has added $2,000 to each American family.

In October 2026, to offset revenue losses from the March Iranian missile strikes on Ras Laffan and the closure of the Strait of Hormuz, QatarEnergy announced a structural pivot to purchase massive long-term US LNG supplies through 2054, marking the first time a Middle Eastern exporter leverages North American supply and global arbitrage to circumvent wartime chokepoint blockades.

== Environmental impacts ==
Airstrikes on industrial and fuel hubs have released a chronic toxic cocktail of benzene, heavy metals, and persistent 'forever chemicals' (PFAS), triggering 'black rain' in major cities and causing long-term health degradation for civilians.

The high oil prices driven by wars in the Middle East, including Iran, created a surge in profits of oil companies, pushing them to increase production as opposed to targets set by the Paris climate agreement. The planned expansion is projected to exceed the International Energy Agency's regular scenario – a 5.9% increase in oil and gas production in the 2020s, leading to a 2.9 °C (5.2 °F) global temperature increase.

In October 2026, Shina Ansari, head of Iran's Department of Environment, reported that recent US-Israeli attacks on fuel storage in Asaluyeh led to significant air pollution. These attacks released 904 tonnes of particulate matter and over 1.5 million tonnes of carbon dioxide.

== Reactions ==
Government reactions to the 2026 Iran war: Iran Israel and the United States Countries that supported the Israeli-American attacks Countries that condemned the Iranian attacks Countries that condemned both attacks Countries that condemned the Israeli-American attacks Countries that expressed mixed reactions or made calls for peace No government reaction

Internationally, the war elicited reactions from governments, faith leaders and global governance bodies, as well as protests, unrest, and coverage from global media. Most countries did not take a definitive side in the conflict, but more countries opposed the US-Israeli attacks than supported them. Some US allies and partners, such as Canada, Saudi Arabia, Ukraine and Argentina, supported the attack, while others, such as France, Italy, Brazil and Turkey, expressed opposition. In the Middle East, most countries criticized the Iranian attacks. In Europe and Latin America, many countries condemned the US-Israeli attacks, and most condemned the Iranian retaliation. In Asia, many condemned the attacks or called for peace. The war provoked protests against it, as well as others in support of the Iranian opposition.

The war was unpopular in the United States, and increasingly so as it continued. A majority of Americans thought the decision to start the war was wrong, that the war had hurt US interests, and that it should end as soon as possible. By July, 58% of Americans opposed the war, and approval for Donald Trump had declined to an all-time low. The March 2026 No Kings protests were the largest civilian protests in American history, and The Economist named the war "America's least popular since polls began". Congress was divided on the issue of a War Powers Resolution, with the House in favor and the Senate opposed. More Americans thought the war was illegal under US and international law than legal.

Public opinion was opposed to the war in 30 countries across Europe, Asia and the Americas (including the US). Opposition to the war was 81% on average. The war led to a worldwide decline in the reputation of the United States and Israel, with the US reputation falling behind that of China in most countries. Israel was the only surveyed country where public opinion supported the war.

Opinion on the attacks was divided within Iran, with many Iranians mourning casualties and attending large public rallies in support of the government. Millions of Iranians and Iraqis and many international leaders and dignitaries attended the state funeral of Ali Khamenei. Others celebrated the attacks and expressed hope for regime change, particularly those within or affiliated with the exiled opposition. An anti-government uprising hoped for by the United States and Israel did not materialize, with some analysts saying that the attacks had bolstered the government's domestic popularity.

The share of each country opposed to involvement in the war. Majorities opposed in shades of red and majorities in support in blue.

Iran's allies' reactions during the conflict differed significantly, even though Western analysts grouped the four countries under the informal CRINK alignment. While Russia supplied targeting intelligence on US forces in addition to defense industry agreements for missile launchers, and China provided diplomatic support, commercial satellite imagery and shipments of dual-use components to Iran, North Korea made brief statements denouncing the Israeli and American strikes but refrained from offering material or weaponry support.

According to Reuters, the conflict involving Iran has resulted in increased oil prices, elevated inflation rates, and a subsequent rise in the cost of living within the United States. A majority of voters in 2025 report experiencing a decline in their economic well-being under the administration of President Trump.

Agreement that their country should avoid involvement in the Iran war, Ipsos March–April 2026
Country	Total agree	Strongly agree	Somewhat agree	Total disagree	Somewhat disagree	Strongly disagree
31-country average	81	48	33	19	13	6
Hungary	93	71	22	7	5	2
Indonesia	90	53	37	10	9	1
Thailand	90	39	51	10	9	1
Germany	89	55	34	12	9	3
South Africa	88	58	30	12	8	4
Poland	88	57	31	12	7	5
New Zealand	87	58	29	13	9	4
Sweden	87	51	36	14	11	3
India	87	46	41	14	10	4
Singapore	87	42	45	12	10	2
Italy	85	65	20	16	12	4
Australia	85	52	33	15	10	5
Malaysia	84	34	50	16	13	3
Ireland	83	54	29	17	11	6
Netherlands	83	50	33	18	13	5
United Kingdom	83	47	36	18	12	6
France	82	41	41	18	14	4
South Korea	81	32	49	18	15	3
Argentina	80	58	22	21	11	10
Chile	80	55	25	20	9	11
Mexico	80	51	29	21	11	10
Colombia	80	48	32	20	12	8
Canada	80	46	34	20	14	6
Brazil	79	56	23	20	13	7
Japan	79	41	38	21	18	3
Belgium	77	43	34	23	16	7
Turkey	76	50	26	24	16	8
Peru	76	46	30	25	14	11
Spain	73	44	29	28	18	10
United States	71	44	27	29	20	9
Israel	43	13	30	58	36	22

== US political rhetoric ==
=== Trump's rally in Grand Island ===
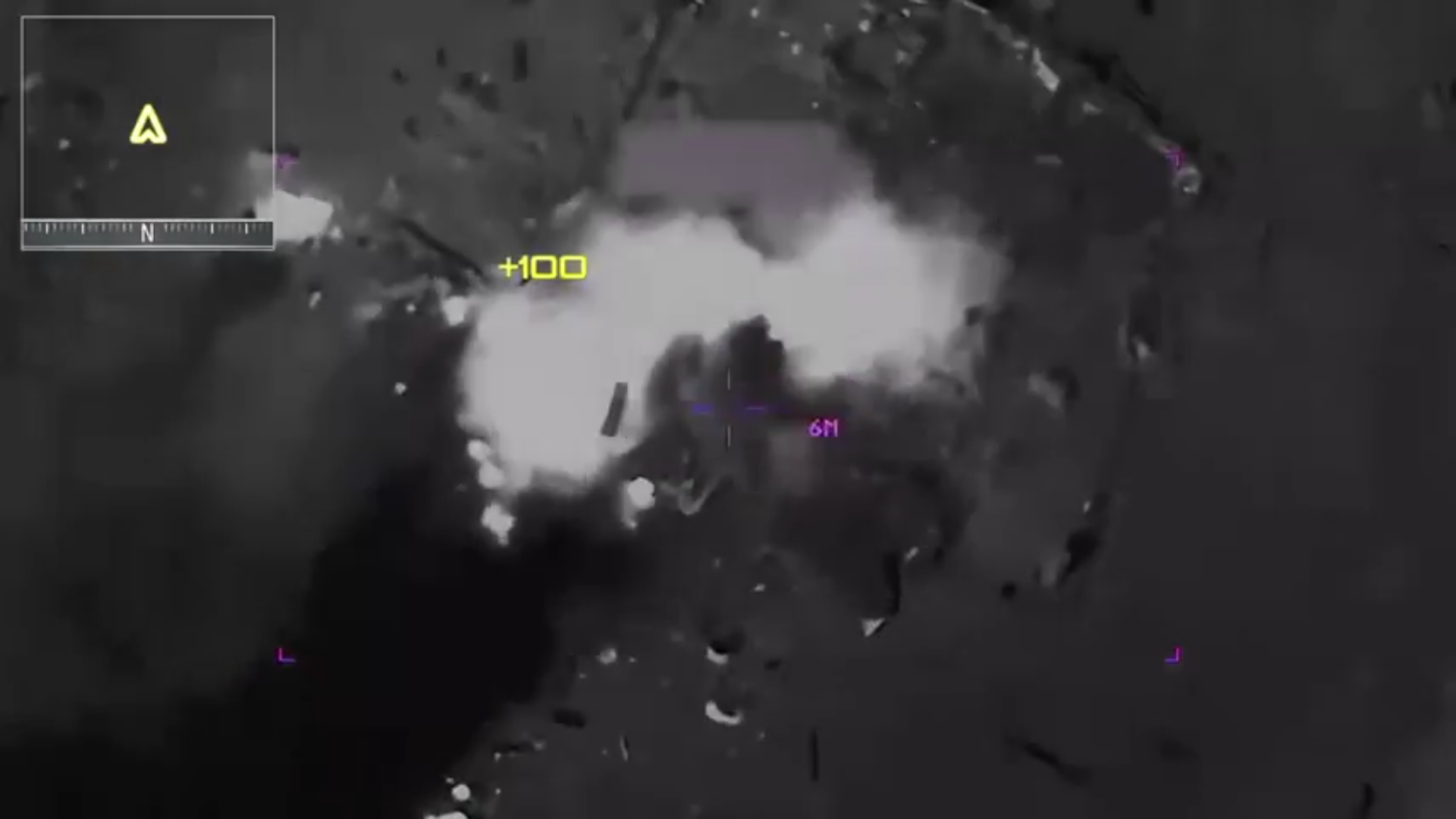
Strike footage with points and video game interface added by the White House

On 5 October 2026, Trump caused intense domestic controversy, when he brought up wartime inflation and fuel prices at a midterm election campaign rally in Grand Island, Nebraska. Trump defended the war's economic effects as a "small price to pay for keeping the world safe", saying, "[t]hey can take out a city. Let them take out Los Angeles. Let them take out San Diego." California officials swiftly and bipartisanly denounced the comments. Gavin Newsom, the governor of California, called the president "deranged and dangerous", accusing him of encouraging a foreign adversary to attack more than 10 million Americans.

San Diego Mayor Todd Gloria and Los Angeles Mayor Karen Bass both denounced the remarks, pointing out that both cities are home to vital US military facilities, such as Naval Base San Diego and Los Angeles Air Force Base. The White House strongly refuted the criticism, with Communications Director Steven Cheung describing the outcry as a "media freakout" with no basis in fact. The administration clarified that Trump was not endorsing an attack, but rather making the clear argument that, had his administration not initiated the military intervention earlier in the year, Iran would have posed a nuclear threat to American cities. On 8 October 2026, Trump said that his statement that Iran may "take out" Los Angeles or San Diego was misunderstood.

=== Rubio's civilizational rhetoric ===
During a visit to the Acropolis in Athens, Greece, on 7 October 2026, US Secretary of State Marco Rubio delivered a speech invoking the Greco-Persian Wars and the Achaemenid destruction of Athens in 480 BC to argue that the US and Europe belong to a common Western civilization that must defend itself against foreign adversaries such as the Persians. He portrayed the United States as the inheritor of ancient Western civilization and called on Western states to build up their militaries and "awaken from [their] long slumber", arguing that "the threats we face today are every bit as real as they were on the dramatic stage of antiquity". The speech prompted pushback from Iranian officials such as Esmail Baghaei and Ghalibaf, who respectively called the comments "anachronism" and said "anyone who brings history into this must be prepared for its repetition".

On 24 October, former president Barack Obama criticized the Trump administration’s handling of the 2026 Iran war at a campaign rally in Cleveland, Ohio. He defended the 2015 Iran nuclear deal, saying it had kept Iran from obtaining nuclear weapons through diplomacy, and criticized Trump for withdrawing from the agreement before starting the war. Obama challenged the administration’s claims of victory, saying that US allies and military bases had been attacked, Americans had been killed and hundreds of Americans had been wounded. He also said that the United States had run down its missile stocks while Iran had gained “veto power” over the Strait of Hormuz, through which oil reaches world markets. He linked the war to rising oil and diesel prices, citing the disruption of oil shipments through the strait. Obama also mocked Defense Secretary Pete Hegseth over his focus on troops’ jawlines and testosterone levels, as well as the Pentagon’s plans to livestream an execution. “These are not serious people,” Obama said.

== Diplomatic efforts ==
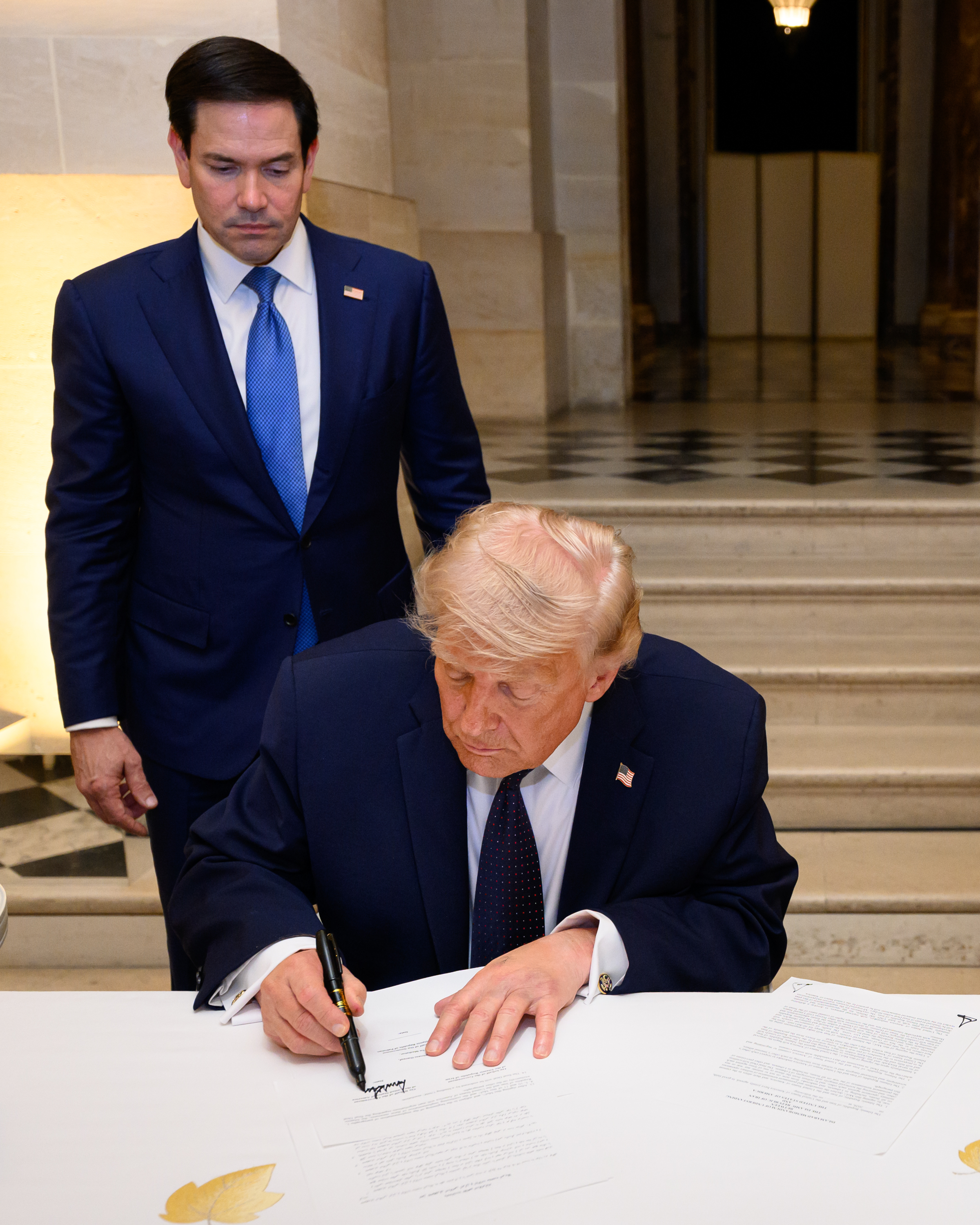
President Donald Trump at Versailles, France signing the Islamabad Memorandum

In 2025 and 2026, Iran and the United States began a series of negotiations aimed at reaching a nuclear peace agreement, following a letter from US president Donald Trump to Iranian supreme leader Ali Khamenei, setting a 60-day deadline for Iran to reach an agreement. After the deadline passed without an agreement in June 2025, Israel launched airstrikes against Iran, starting the Twelve-Day War. As of June 28, 2026, there were three rounds of talks before the Islamabad talks that led to the Islamabad Memorandum, and two rounds of technical talks.

The first round was held in Oman on April 12, 2025, led by US special envoy Steve Witkoff and Iranian foreign minister Abbas Araghchi. A second round of Omani-mediated talks took place in Rome on April 19, 2025, again between Witkoff and Araghchi. This was followed by a third round in Muscat around a week later; an expert-level meeting to develop a framework for a possible nuclear agreement was led by Michael Anton for the US and by Majid Takht-Ravanchi for Iran.

In an interview with Al Jazeera on 19 September, Mohsen Rezaei stated that they had conveyed three conditions to Washington via Qatar—including an end to the war on all fronts, the unfreezing of their assets, and the lifting of the naval blockade—and were awaiting a response from President Trump.

According to an Axios report on November 2, 2026, CIA Director John Ratcliffe, Scott Besant, and Marco Rubio advised Trump to maintain the status of “no war, no deal” and allow the economic pressure campaign against Iran to continue. According to a knowledgeable source, Ratcliffe believes that continued economic pressure would force Iran to make more concessions or may even cause domestic instability and a popular rebellion.

=== June 2026 Memorandum of Understanding ===
After concluding that continued hostilities would risk economic calamity, Donald Trump signed a memorandum of understanding (MOU) on behalf of the United States during a ceremony at the Palace of Versailles on 17 June 2026. The signing followed an earlier, digital signing of the MOU by the foreign ministers of the two principal belligerents. In the MOU, the United States and Iran agreed to suspend hostilities for 60 days and to establish a framework for a permanent peace under which the US would make major financial and political concessions to the Islamic Republic of Iran.

The memorandum began to collapse on 7 July 2026, when Iranian forces attacked three commercial vessels in the Strait of Hormuz, including a Qatari LNG tanker, setting it ablaze and damaging other ships. Iranian officials told The New York Times that internal inquiries traced the decision to Hossein Taeb, head of the Basij and former Revolutionary Guards' intelligence agency chief. The United States responded with airstrikes on Iranian territory within a day of the ship attacks, effectively ending the ceasefire and resuming hostilities between the two countries.

== Analysis ==
In the early months of the war, some analysts argued that Iran's ability to preserve the Islamic Republic, strike American bases, and disrupt the Strait of Hormuz showed the limits of American military power. Other analysts cautioned against treating the Islamic Republic's survival as a strategic victory. The US and Israel inflicted severe losses on Iran's conventional capabilities despite Iran's ability to impose costs on American allies. Michael Froman, president of the Council on Foreign Relations, argued after the first ceasefire that it was "simply too soon to tell" whether the war had advanced American interests, citing both American military achievements and Iran's use of the Strait as leverage.

Since hostilities resumed in July, analysts have considered the war outcome unresolved. In August, Reuters' columnist Ron Bousso described the conflict as a stalemate in which neither side had shown a convincing strategy for breaking the deadlock.

Donald Trump's threats to destroy Iranian infrastructure have drawn warnings from international law experts that such actions could constitute war crimes under the Rome Statute, and be actionable under universal jurisdiction.

== See also ==
- Censorship during the 2026 Iran war
- Impact of the 2026 Iran war on the 2026 FIFA World Cup
- Misinformation during the 2026 Iran war
- Antisemitism during the 2026 Iran war
- Operation Project Freedom
- Alleged Iranian attempts to assassinate Donald Trump
- Economic impact of the 2026 Iran war
- Operation Economic Fury

=== Related events ===
- American expansionism under Donald Trump
- 1979 oil crisis
- March–May 2025 United States attacks in Yemen
- 2026 United States intervention in Venezuela
- Iranian economic crisis
- List of wars involving Iran
