= Reactions to the 2026 Iran war =

Government reactions to the 2026 Iran war: Iran Israel and the United States Countries that supported the Israeli-American attacks Countries that condemned the Iranian attacks Countries that condemned both attacks Countries that condemned the Israeli-American attacks Countries that expressed mixed reactions or made calls for peace No government reaction

On 28 February 2026, the United States and Israel launched joint airstrikes on Iran, starting the 2026 Iran war. The strikes targeted Iranian officials, military commanders, and military assets, assassinating Ali Khamenei, the supreme leader of Iran. Iran responded with missile and drone strikes against Israel, U.S. bases, and Arab countries in the Middle East, as well as closing the Strait of Hormuz.

Internationally, the war elicited reactions from governments, faith leaders and global governance bodies, as well as protests, unrest, and coverage from global media. Most countries did not take a definitive side in the conflict, but more countries opposed the US-Israeli attacks than supported them. Some US allies and partners, such as Canada, Saudi Arabia, Ukraine and Argentina, supported the attack, while others, such as France, Italy, Brazil and Turkey, expressed opposition. In the Middle East, most countries criticized the Iranian attacks. In Europe and Latin America, many countries condemned the US-Israeli attacks, and most condemned the Iranian retaliation. In Asia, many condemned the attacks or called for peace. The war provoked protests against it, as well as others in support of the Iranian opposition.

The war was unpopular in the United States, and increasingly so as it continued. A majority of Americans thought the decision to start the war was wrong, that the war had hurt US interests, and that it should end as soon as possible. By July, 58% of Americans opposed the war, and approval for Donald Trump had declined to an all-time low. The March 2026 No Kings protests were the largest civilian protests in American history, and The Economist named the war "America's least popular since polls began". Congress was divided on the issue of a War Powers Resolution, with the House in favor and the Senate opposed. More Americans thought the war was illegal under US and international law than legal.

Public opinion was opposed to the war in 30 countries across Europe, Asia and the Americas (including the US). Opposition to the war was 81% on average. The war led to a worldwide decline in the reputation of the United States and Israel, with the US reputation falling behind that of China in most countries. Israel was the only surveyed country where public opinion supported the war.

Opinion on the attacks was divided within Iran, with many Iranians mourning casualties and attending large public rallies in support of the government. Millions of Iranians and Iraqis and many international leaders and dignitaries attended the state funeral of Ali Khamenei. Others celebrated the attacks and expressed hope for regime change, particularly those within or affiliated with the exiled opposition. An anti-government uprising hoped for by the United States and Israel did not materialize, with some analysts saying that the attacks had bolstered the government's domestic popularity.

== Public opinion ==
=== United States ===
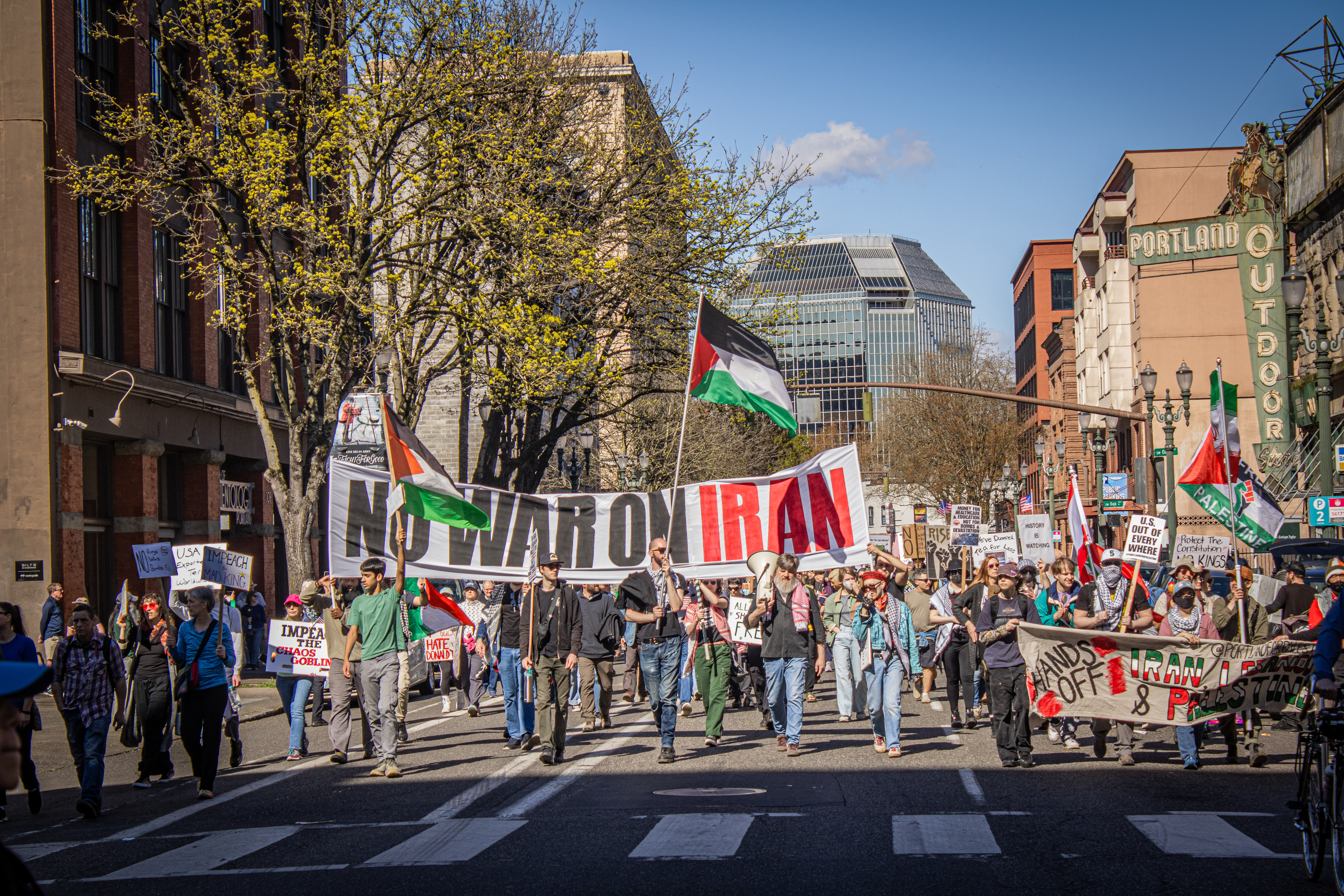
Protestors speak out against the US government's involvement in the war in Portland, Oregon, during No Kings 3. 28 March 2026

Opinion polls showed that most Americans opposed the war from the outset. Support for the war declined from 40% on March 3 to 34% by July 18, according to polling aggregates, with the share of Americans opposed to the war increasing from 48% to 58% over the same period. Majorities of Americans thought that it was important to prevent Iran obtaining a nuclear weapon, but said that it was the wrong decision to start the war, that the war was not worth fighting, that the war had hurt US interests, that the US should end its attacks, and that the war should end as soon as possible. A plurality of Americans said that the war was illegal under both US and international law.

In part a reaction to the war, the March 2026 No Kings protests were the largest civilian protests in American history. In July, The Economist named the Iran war "America's least popular since polls began". Approval for Donald Trump declined to a record low in July, with 37% approval and 60% disapproval by the end of September. Trump's foreign affairs approval declined from 39% in January to 29% in September, with approval for his handling of Iran at 26%. Opposition to the war remained high, with net support declining from -8% on March 3 to an all-time low of -27% on September 22.

A March 1 Reuters/Ipsos poll found that 43% of Americans opposed the war, 27% were supportive and 29% were uncertain. An NBC poll found 52% of registered voters were against military action, while 41% supported it. Polls showed splits along political and demographic lines. Most Republicans supported the action, while most Democrats and independents opposed it. A CNN poll on 2 March showed that 59% of Americans opposed the U.S. military action against Iran while 41% supported it. A Reuters/Ipsos poll found that 47% disapprove of the strikes while 27% approve of them.

Most Americans believed that Trump had not properly explained the war's goals. A 22 March CBS poll of 3,335 American adults reported that 92% believed it was important for the conflict to end as quickly as possible, four in five said it was important to make sure the Iranian people were safe and free, 73% said it was important for the US to permanently end the Iranian nuclear program, 68% said it was important to stop Iran from posing a threat to other countries, and 53% said it would be unacceptable to end the war with the Islamic Republic still in power. A Reuters/Ipsos poll conducted from 17 to 19 March 2026, found that 65% thought Trump would order a large-scale ground war in Iran, while only 7% supported such a move.

In an April 17–20 Economist-YouGov poll, more Americans agreed with Pope Leo XIV's comments against the war, by 48% to 28%, than with Trump and Vance. Atheists and agnostics were twice as likely to agree with him (80%) as Catholics or Protestants (42% and 39%, respectively).

In a July 8–13 Washington Post-Ipsos poll, 68% of Americans said the war had not been worth fighting, while 28% said it had. This assessment was worse than any Post poll during the 2003–2011 Iraq War, and equalling the worst on Afghanistan in July 2013. According to Post polling, strong approval for Trump dropped from 27% in February to 15% in July, and net approval from 45% to 37%, the first time across both Trump terms that a majority of approvers support him only "somewhat" rather than "strongly".

A July 12–15 Politico poll showed declining support for the war among Republican and MAGA voters. Between May and July, Republicans in favor of continuing the war even if it increases costs for Americans declined from 46% to 32%, while those in favor only if it does not increased from 28% to 37%, and those against the war under all circumstances increased from 14% to 21%. Among MAGA voters, the shares were 37%, 37% and 19%, respectively.

According to a July 10–13 Economist-YouGov poll, 55% think the US should not continue attacking Iran, and 27% think it should. 65% against 15% wanted to end the war "as quickly as possible", including 82% of Democrats (against 5%), 66% of independents (against 11%), and 47% of Republicans (against 29%).

In a July 17–19 University of Maryland poll, a majority of Americans (58% to 12%) thought the war had a more negative than positive impact on American interests. Pluralities of Americans believed the US and Israel had initiated the war illegally under international law (by 39% to 19%) and under US law (40% to 25%). 22% said the US should focus on making the Middle East entirely nuclear-free (including both Israel, which has already acquired nuclear weapons, and Iran), 21% on preventing Iran acquiring nuclear weapons by force if necessary, and 19% on preventing it without military force, while 10% said that a nuclear-armed Israel and Iran could deter each other.

In a July 20–24 CBS News/YouGov poll, 76% of Americans believed the war had been more challenging than the Trump administration anticipated.

An Associated Press-NORC poll conducted in July 2026 found that 64% of Americans did not see the war with Iran as worth fighting while 33% did.

The Center on Conscience & War reported that hotline callers opposed the Minab school attack and "dying for Israel". A recent Reuters/Ipsos poll of 4,505 Americans, taken five months into the U.S. war with Iran, shows that only 35% support the conflict, while 58% expect gasoline prices to rise compared to just 15% who anticipate improvement.

After the 2026 United States elections, a November 6–9 Reuters-Ipsos poll found that 71% versus 24% agreed that ending the Iran war should be a priority of the new US Congress, including 93% of Democrats, 70% of independents and 51% of Republicans. A November 4–6 YouGov poll found that 42% of registered voters supported impeaching Defence Secretary Pete Hegseth, versus 35% that did not.

==== Iranian Americans ====
A poll conducted by the National Iranian American Council, regarded as the Islamic Republic's lobby, found that 49.3% of Iranian-American respondents opposed the US-Israeli attack on Iran, while 48.9% supported it. A total of 61.6% supported diplomacy, while 35.4% opposed. A Zogby poll conducted from 24 to 27 March 2026 found that 66.1% of Iranian Americans opposed the war.

=== Iran ===
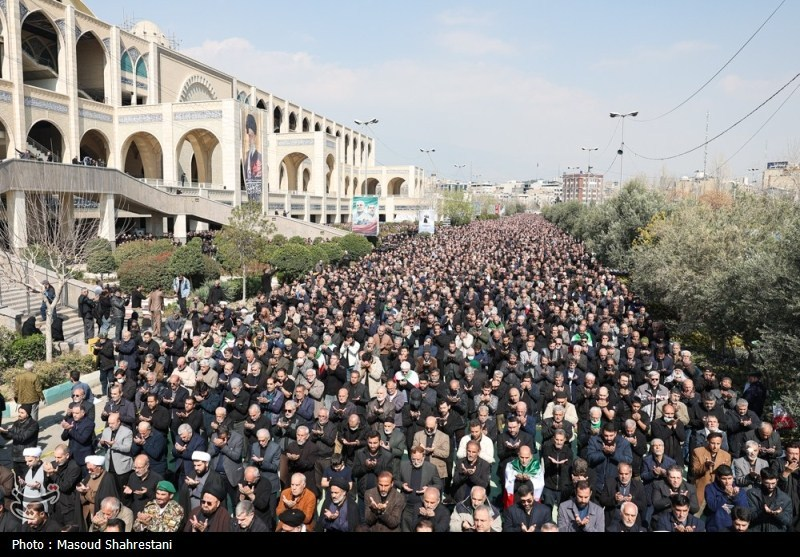
Worshippers gather at the Grand Mosalla for the first Friday prayer after the 2026 airstrikes on Tehran.

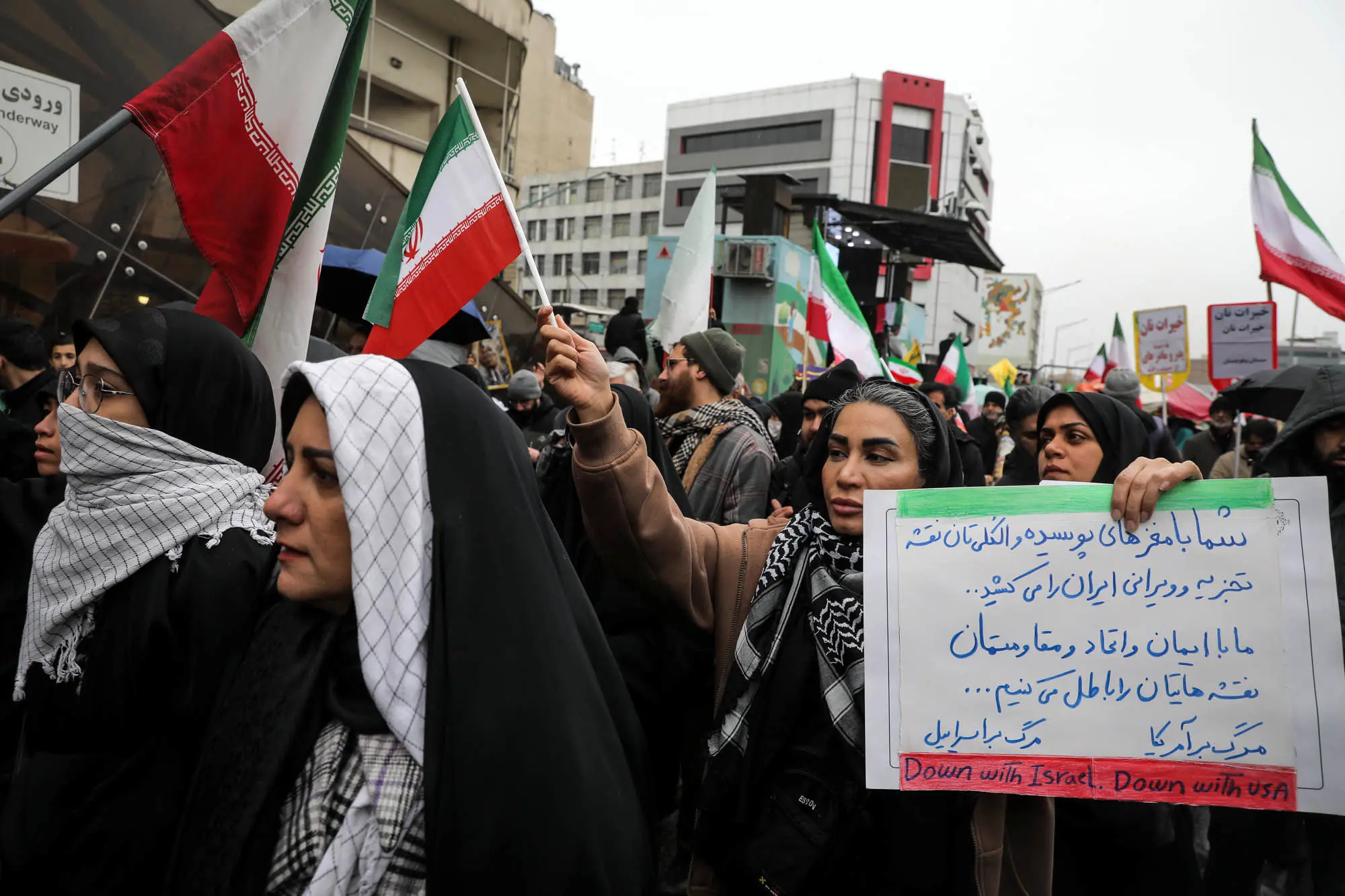
Demonstrators gather in Tehran for the annual International Quds Day rally on 13 March 2026

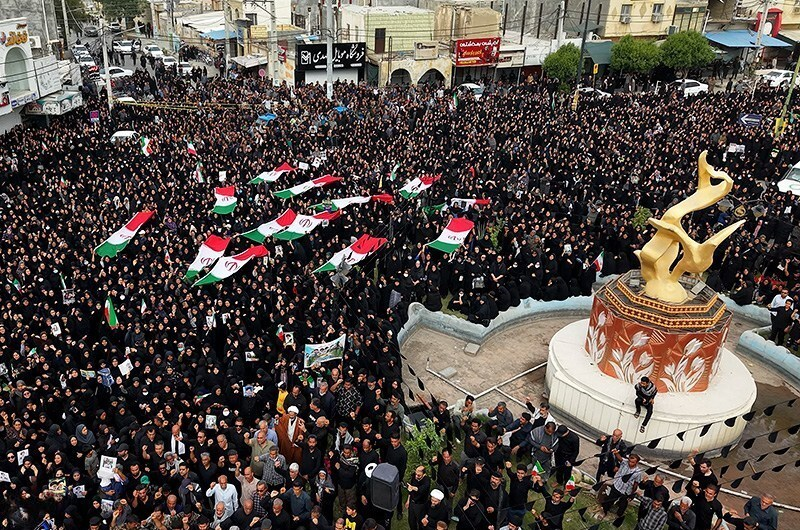
Funeral procession for victims of the airstrike on the Minab girls' school, Iran, 3 March 2026

A holistic picture of civilian reactions in Iran is difficult to obtain due to the government's control over the circulation of information, the renewed internet blackout, and the ongoing heated nature of the war. After the initial strikes, both celebration and mourning at the killing of Iranian leaders was reported. No anti-government uprising followed.

Civilians expressed fear, grief and anger at the US–Israeli strikes, and at ensuing civilian casualties. BBC reported that most Iranians consider attacking civilian infrastructure unacceptable. Some civilians who had opposed the Islamic Republic and supported regime change later recoiled at the prolonged and violent nature of the war. A sociologist inside Iran said that the war was causing a rally around the flag effect.

Early pro-government rallies occurred in Yasuj, where crowds mourned Khamenei, and in Enqelab Square on 1 March. Others celebrated the attacks, expressing the hope that the events might weaken or topple the regime. Some celebrated the death of Khamenei. A 1 March 2026 video showed a crowd toppling a monument dedicated to Ruhollah Khomeini.

After Mojtaba Khamenei was named the next supreme leader, some Iranians chanted "Death to Mojtaba" from their windows in Tehran.

As of 15 March, only pro-government rallies appeared in Tehran's major squares. Many pro-government rallies followed, encouraged by authorities. According to BBC, no mass anti-government rallies took place, in part due to police warnings of consequences for "tak[-ing] action in the cities at the behest of the enemy".

During the 17 March Chaharshanbe Suri festivities ahead of the Nowruz holiday, many Iranians defied orders from the authorities and celebrated in the streets. Footage showed security forces firing gunshots to disperse crowds.

On the last Friday of Ramadan, thousands of Iranians took to the streets of Tehran in support of Palestinians and condemning the attacks as part of Quds Day day. Many Iranian government figures were seen at the demonstrations, including Pezeshkian and Ali Larijani. Israel threatened to attack the area, but demonstrations still took place.

On 18 March, thousands of civilians joined a funeral procession for Larijani. Residents also cheered from their homes and celebrated with fireworks after Larijani's death.

Iran closed historic sites during Nowruz on 20 March, stating that ceremonies would not be held in these locations. During Nowruz celebrations, activists affiliated with the People's Mojahedin Organization of Iran (PMOI) Resistance Units conducted a campaign in Zahedan, expressing support for the National Council of Resistance of Iran (NCRI) and its proposed provisional government.

On 29 March, a resident was filmed saying "Thank you Trump" outside a police station in the Chitgar destroyed by American airstrikes. Trump's 1 April post threatening to send Iran "back to the Stone Age", received negative reactions from Iranians. The same day, NPR reported that most Iranians fleeing to Turkey supported the US-Israeli strikes.

=== Israel ===
A March 2026 survey by the Israel Democracy Institute (IDI) found that 82% of the Israeli public supported ongoing military operations, including 93% of Jewish Israelis and 26% of Arab Israelis.

In a March 20–April 3 Ipsos survey, 40% of Israelis believed the war would end within the next month, a further 40% within three months, 14% by the end of the year, and 6% thought it would continue beyond the end of the year.

After the publishing of the Islamabad Memorandum of Understanding, a 16–22 June poll by the Institute for National Security Studies found that 40% of Israelis believed that Iran had won the war, 15% that Israel had won the war, and 43% that there had not been a decisive outcome. A 17-20 June survey by the Hebrew University of Jerusalem and Agam Institute found that 93.1% of Israelis believed that Iran had won the war, 82.9% believed it weakened Israel's long-term security, and 86% had a negative opinion of the Islamabad Memorandum.

=== International ===
Share of each country opposed to involvement in the war. Majorities opposed in shades of red and majorities in support in blue.

In a 20 March–3 April Ipsos survey of 31 countries, a majority in 30 countries said that their country should avoid becoming involved in the Iran war, including large majorities in France, Germany, the UK, Australia, Canada, Argentina, South Korea and Japan, and in the US itself. Israel was the only country where a majority supported involvement in the war. On average, 81% of people opposed involvement.

The average share that believe that the US will have a positive impact on world affairs over the next decade fell in 27 out of 29 countries surveyed by Ipsos since October 2025. At 38% across 30 countries, the average share was lower than for China at 50%. The average was 40% in the Asia-Pacific region, 28% in Europe, 56% in Latin America, and 42% in North America, and was lower than for China in all four regions. This continued a decline seen during both Trump terms. Across 30 countries, the average share with a positive view of the US fell from 66% in October 2016 to 38% in April 2026, having recovered to 64% in October 2022 under President Joe Biden.

A Spring 2026 global study by Pew Research Center found that the United States was viewed less positively than China in 25 out of 36 surveyed countries, the first time in roughly 20 years of tracking that a majority of countries viewed China more positively. Laura Silver, associate director of Pew's Global Attitudes Research, attributed the decline in trust to the war with Iran, as well as to the Trump administration's threats to Greenland, the intervention in Venezuela, and the US role in the Gaza war. These countries included traditional American allies such as France, Germany, the UK and Canada, and five out of six Latin American countries. Only six countries viewed the US more positively. (Note: Of 36 countries, only Poland, the Philippines, South Korea, India, Japan and Israel viewed the US more positively than China.)

The Pew study found that since 2025, opinions of Israel had declined in 13 out of 24 countries, improving in only one (Greece). The largest declines were in South Korea, Italy, Germany, Argentina and Nigeria. Views of Benjamin Netanyahu also declined in 13 out of 24 countries.

Agreement that their country should avoid involvement in the Iran war, Ipsos March–April 2026
Country	Total agree	Strongly agree	Somewhat agree	Total disagree	Somewhat disagree	Strongly disagree
31-country average	81	48	33	19	13	6
Hungary	93	71	22	7	5	2
Indonesia	90	53	37	10	9	1
Thailand	90	39	51	10	9	1
Germany	89	55	34	12	9	3
South Africa	88	58	30	12	8	4
Poland	88	57	31	12	7	5
New Zealand	87	58	29	13	9	4
Sweden	87	51	36	14	11	3
India	87	46	41	14	10	4
Singapore	87	42	45	12	10	2
Italy	85	65	20	16	12	4
Australia	85	52	33	15	10	5
Malaysia	84	34	50	16	13	3
Ireland	83	54	29	17	11	6
Netherlands	83	50	33	18	13	5
United Kingdom	83	47	36	18	12	6
France	82	41	41	18	14	4
South Korea	81	32	49	18	15	3
Argentina	80	58	22	21	11	10
Chile	80	55	25	20	9	11
Mexico	80	51	29	21	11	10
Colombia	80	48	32	20	12	8
Canada	80	46	34	20	14	6
Brazil	79	56	23	20	13	7
Japan	79	41	38	21	18	3
Belgium	77	43	34	23	16	7
Turkey	76	50	26	24	16	8
Peru	76	46	30	25	14	11
Spain	73	44	29	28	18	10
United States	71	44	27	29	20	9
Israel	43	13	30	58	36	22

==== Argentina ====
A March 2026 survey by Zuban Córdoba, an agency in Argentina, showed that 7 out of 10 Argentines disapproved of the country's support for the US and Israel, with 66.4% of those surveyed responding that President Milei's alignment with those two countries is not representative of the Argentine people. Another poll conducted by Zuban Córdoba in August 2026 about generalities of Milei's foreign policy found a similar result, with only 26% of voters supporting the alignment with the United States, mostly from hardcore libertarians.

==== Australia ====
A March 2026 poll found that the majority of Australians (61%) wanted their country to "stay out of the conflict entirely" and only 13% wanted Australia to become involved. 39% of respondents opposed US-Israeli military actions in Iran while 28% supported them. At the same time, 47% supported regime change in Tehran, compared to 9% wanting the current government to stay in power.

==== Canada ====
A March Angus Reid 2026 poll found that 48% of Canadians opposed the air strikes against Iran, while 34% supported them.

==== Croatia ====
An April "HRejting" poll found that 38% of respondents blamed US, while 24.5% blamed Israel for the war; 64% of respondents believed that "there are no winners in this war", and 76% agreed with the opinion that the attacks on Iran were "unilateral aggression by the United States of America and Israel and a violation of international law".

==== Germany ====
A March 2026 Infratest-dimap poll found that 58% of Germans said US attacks on Iran were not justified.

==== Italy ====
A poll found that 56% opposed the US and Israel's attacks against Iran.

==== Japan ====
A poll published by the Jiji Press on 12 March found that only 7% of Japanese supported the US-Israeli attacks on Iran, while 75% did not support them. Broken down by party, those who opposed were measured at 69.9% by Liberal Democratic Party supporters, 71.4% by Japan Innovation Party supporters, 83.3% by Centrist Reform Alliance supporters, 75.0% by Democratic Party for the People supporters, and 71.3% for supporters of Sanae Takaichi's Cabinet. According to an ANN opinion poll conducted on 21 and 22 March, 7% supported the US and Israel's attacks while 86% did not support them, and 52% opposed dispatching the Japan Self-Defense Forces to ensure security in the region.

A Kyodo News poll released on 8 March found that 50% of Japanese supported their government's response to the US-Israeli attack while 42.9% did not support it. According to a Kyodo News poll conducted on 4 and 5 April, 80.3% said the US-Israeli attack on Iran was a "mistaken decision". At the same time, 50.1% supported the response of their government in the war while 42.2% did not support it.

==== Saudi Arabia ====
A June 2026 poll found that 49% of respondents supported Saudi strikes on Iranian missile launch sites.

==== Spain ====
A poll found that 68% of respondents rejected the US and Israel's attacks on Iran.

==== United Kingdom ====
A 2 March 2026 YouGov poll found that Britons opposed the attacks by 49% to 28%. A 10 March 2026 poll found that 59% opposed.

==== Philippine ====
Hundreds of people in the Philippines were arrested during demonstrations against Trump's visit to the country. The US-Israeli war on Iran, which has increased the cost of living in the country, was among the protesters' main concerns.

== Protests and unrest ==
=== North America ===
Anti-war protestors in Washington D.C.

Iranian diaspora members protesting in Washington, D.C., following the military strikes on Iran on 28 February 2026

Several "Hands Off Iran" protests were organized in the United States. Approximately 100 people attended a rally at Federal Plaza in Chicago. In Columbus, Ohio, a protest was held in Goodale Park. In Indianapolis, a protest was held at Military Park. Indivisible Jax organized a protest in Jacksonville, Florida. Hundreds of people gathered at Times Square in New York City. Approximately 100 people gathered at Pioneer Courthouse Square in downtown Portland, Oregon. In Seattle, anti-war protesters gathered at Pike Place Market.

On 1 March, a shooting at a bar in Austin, Texas, was carried out by an American man of Senegalese descent wearing a shirt that read "Property of Allah" and an undershirt bearing the flag of the Islamic Republic of Iran. The same day, a local gym owned by an Iranian-Canadian anti-regime activist located outside Toronto was shot with 17 bullets, hours after Khamenei's death. On 10 March, two suspects fired multiple shots at the U.S. Consulate in Toronto, an act the Royal Canadian Mounted Police designated a "national security incident." Prime Minister Mark Carney condemned the shooting as "reprehensible violence," while Ontario Premier Doug Ford called the attack "absolutely unacceptable." In response, the RCMP heightened security at U.S. and Israeli diplomatic missions in Toronto and Ottawa.

=== Asia ===
Gulf Arab businessmen, like Emirati billionaire Khalaf al-Habtoor, sent protests to Donald Trump for dragging the region into war with Iran without any consultation and questioning if the US calculated the risks for the Arab countries security and if their military activity was an initiative from the Trump administration or by pressures from the State of Israel and its own agenda in the context of Arab–Israeli conflict.

In March, Japanese organization Nihon Hidankyo issued a statement calling for a cease-fire and accusing the United States and Israel of carrying out "preemptive strikes on Iran that disregard international law."

In Baghdad, demonstrators reacting to Khamenei's assassination confronted security forces near the Green Zone, and protesters attempted to storm the US embassy and block roads leading to it. Protesters were seen waving flags and shouting slogans while mourning Khamenei.

Riots broke out near the US consulate in Karachi in response to the assassination, with demonstrators burning and smearing the building's windows and attempting to storm it. As protests escalated, U.S. Marine Security Guard personnel at the consulate in Karachi opened fire, killing at least 10 protesters and injuring over 60 people. Demonstrators also vandalized several other buildings in Pakistan, including a regional office affiliated with the UNMOGIP in Skardu, Gilgit-Baltistan.

There have also been protests and violent unrest in Bahrain by the Shiite majority, directed against the ruling Sunni Al-Khalifa dynasty and the United States. Bahraini authorities have arrested people for celebrating Iranian strikes on sites in Bahrain or posting footage of Iranian strikes online.

=== Europe ===
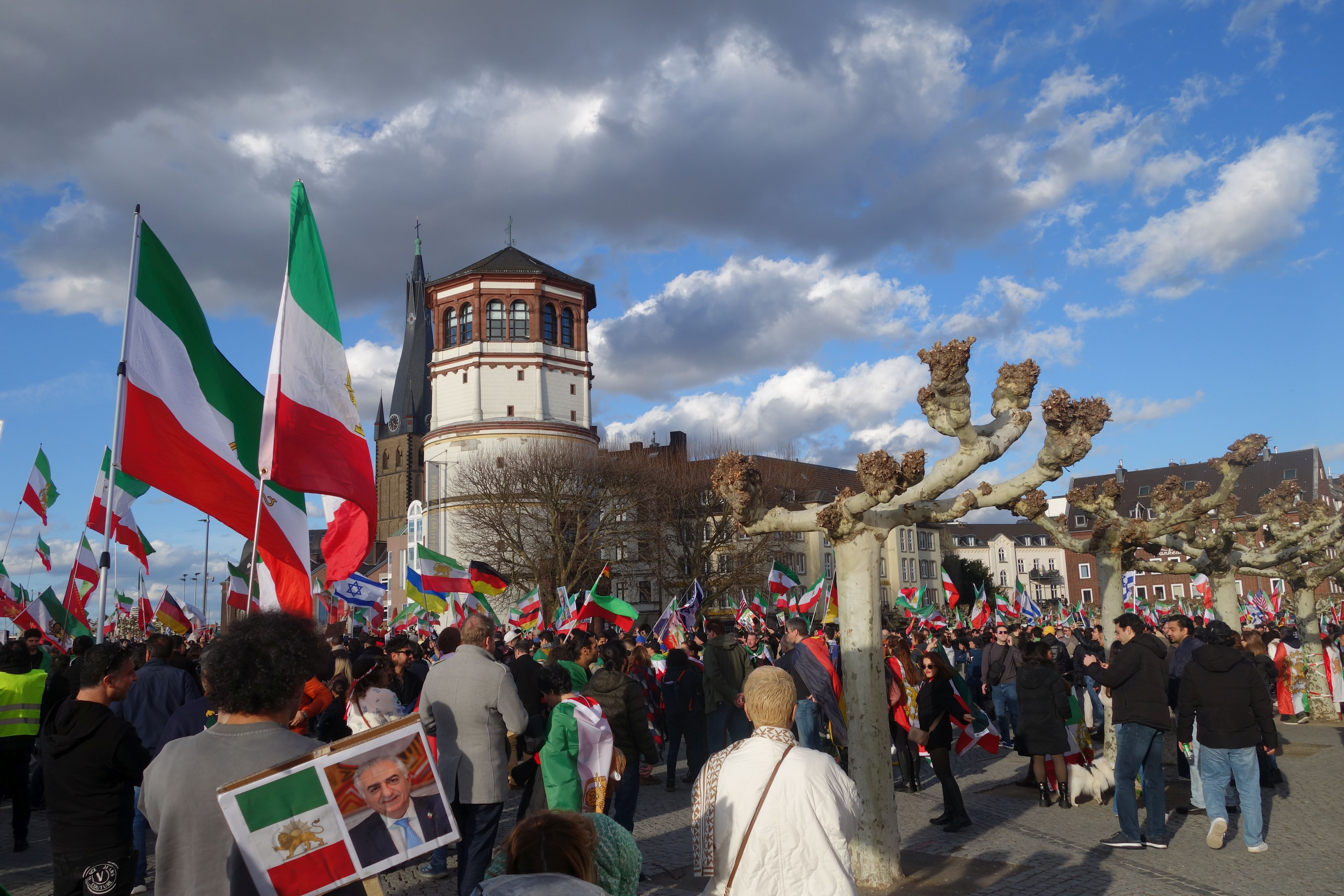
Protesters at Burgplatz, Düsseldorf, on 1 March 2026

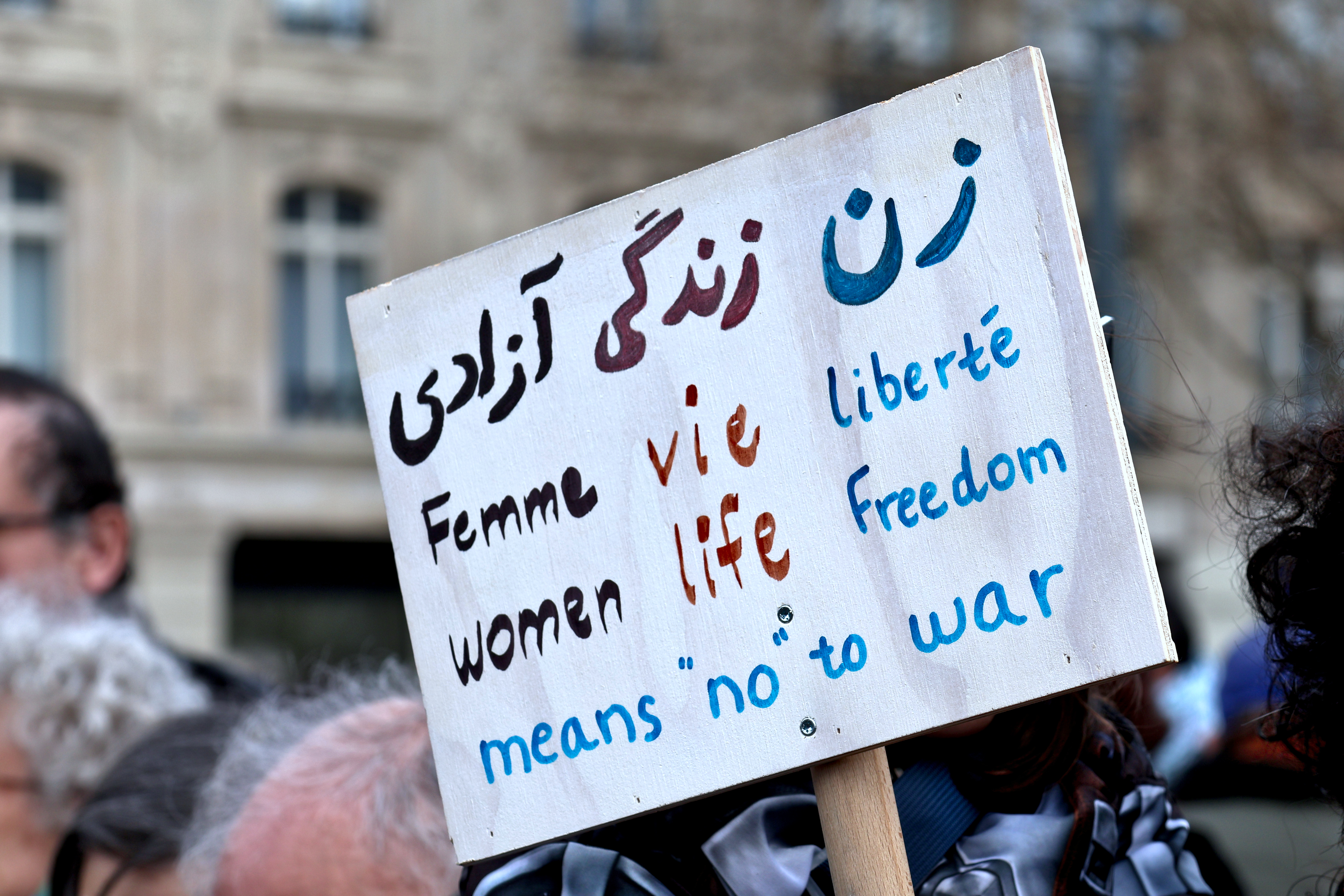
Placard in Paris reading "Women Life Freedom means no to war" in Persian, French and English

On 8 March, an explosion was reported at the Embassy of the United States in Oslo, Norway. On 9 March, an explosion was reported in Liège, Belgium, where it caused damage to a synagogue.

=== Betting ===
There has been betting on events and the outcome of the war, prompting US politicians to call for a ban on such speculation, raising questions about whether the bets were based on insider information and what betting markets should be allowed. Notably, Polymarket has been used extensively, with betters making large winnings on various activities during the early days of the war.

== Iran ==
Government and military leaders uniformly decried the attacks. The public divided into supporters and opponents of attacks, although security forces quickly suppressed the former. Religious leaders also opposed the attacks, defending the regime. The Iranian diaspora generally supported the attacks, anticipating regime change.

=== Government ===
Iran's Foreign Ministry vowed a response as Iranian forces struck US bases across the Persian Gulf. The Supreme National Security Council said Iran was targeted by a "brutal air operation" carried out by the US and Israel, saying: "This occurred once again during negotiations, and the enemy imagines that the resilient Iranian nation will surrender to their petty demands through these cowardly actions." Iranian foreign minister Abbas Araghchi called the attacks "wholly unprovoked, illegal, and illegitimate" and said attacks by Iran will continue until as long as they are defending. Vice President Aref stated that the path to social justice will not be resisted or stopped by any missile attack. Iranian president Masoud Pezeshkian said that if the US and Israel are not held accountable for their actions "global order will be shaken". Pezeshkian said that US should take their unconditional surrender demand "to their grave". He initially apologized for the attacks on neighboring nations, blaming "miscommunication in the ranks". Later he said that Iran had to target countries whose territory was used to attack Iran. Iranian officials rejected Trump's attempt to insert himself into the government's succession plans.

On 19 March, Iranian Foreign Ministry spokesperson Esmail Baghaei accused the US and Israel of "terrorist acts" over the deaths of top figures, calling the attacks an "illegal war". He said that Australia's military assets were legitimate targets, over the deployment of a surveillance aircraft along with personnel to the UAE. On 20 March, Abolfazl Shekarchi warned US and Israeli personnel that Iran was tracking the movements of "officials, commanders, and pilots" beyond active conflict zones and warned that public and recreational locations would no longer be safe for them. Iran denied targeting Azerbaijan, Turkey and Oman, blaming "Israeli false flag" attacks.

Vice President Mohammad Reza Aref described the alleged use of a bunker-buster bomb in an attack on the university as a "symbol of Trump’s madness and ignorance". Deputy foreign minister Kazem Gharibabadi condemned what he called the repeated targeting of historical and cultural sites in Iran as "an assault on part of Iran's civilizational identity". Araghchi labeled the strike on a Tehran fuel depot as "ecocide". The Iranian government declared it had lifted import/export rules and restrictions, and announced that fuel and medicine were readily available. The national post temporarily paused parcel delivery. All sporting events were canceled. Iranian hajj pilgrims returned by land. On 13 June, Iranian hardliners chanted against Araghchi and Parliament Speaker and chief negotiator Mohammad Bagher Ghalibaf as they protested the deal with the United States outside the Iran Foreign Ministry office.

Tehran alleged that the United Arab Emirates (UAE) played an active role in the war from its inception, stating that the UAE had acted in addition to hosting US facilities. Iranian ambassador to the UN Amir-Saeid Iravani demanded compensation from Bahrain, Jordan, Qatar, Saudi Arabia, and the UAE for allegedly violating their obligations towards Iran.

The SNSC ordered people to evacuate Tehran, but not Chabahar, Bandar Abbas, Mahshahr, and Bushehr. Schools closed and students switched to offline home Shaadapp. The government also renewed a "near total" internet blackout in Iran, as NetBlocks reported internet activity dropping to 4% of ordinary levels. Iranians abroad reported that they were unable to reach family in Iran. On 19 March, Iran promised more attacks on energy sites in the region. They also threatened that if the US would attack their power grid, they would attack the US electricity infrastructure. Iranian foreign minister Abbas Araghchi also condemned the attacks on Iranian nuclear facilities and asked compensation.

On 29 March 2026, parliament speaker Mohammad Bagher Ghalibaf rejected negotiations with the United States. Ghalibaf said that entities that hold US bonds are legitimate targets. The IRGC threatened American and Israeli universities. On 15 April, Ali Nikzad said that Iran would avenge the killing of Ali Khamenei and other top commanders.

Iran has sued the US in the Hague Tribunal over the 2026 war, invoking the Algiers Accords.

==== State funeral of Ali Khamenei ====
The state funeral of Ali Khamenei, the second supreme leader of Iran, took place from 3 to 9 July 2026, following his assassination in a US-Israeli attack on 28 February 2026. Several ceremonies were held in Tehran and Qom, alongside separate events in Iraq (Najaf and Karbala), before his burial at the Imam Reza shrine in Mashhad.

Major processions began on 3 July, with large rallies and foreign participants arriving. Hundreds of thousands of followers attended the first day of the funeral, and the Iranian government facilitated the event. The funeral procession in Tehran was attended by millions coming from all over Iran. The absence of Mojtaba Khamenei, Iran's new supreme leader and Ali Khamenei's son, from the funeral received global coverage, raising questions about his health and as to who is leading the country.

Crowds carried banners of the slogan of the funeral, "We must rise" (Persian: باید برخاست, romanized: Bâyad barxâst), alongside a red clenched fist, symbolizing Iran's resistance against the United States and Israel. Mourners called for revenge, carrying banners threatening violence against Donald Trump and Benjamin Netanyahu, and chanting "Death to America" and "Death to Israel".

=== Religious leaders ===
Ayatollahs Naser Makarem Shirazi and Hossein Noori Hamedani issued a fatwa for jihad against America for Muslims to avenge Khamenei's death, saying vengeance was "the religious duty of all Muslims".

=== Diaspora ===
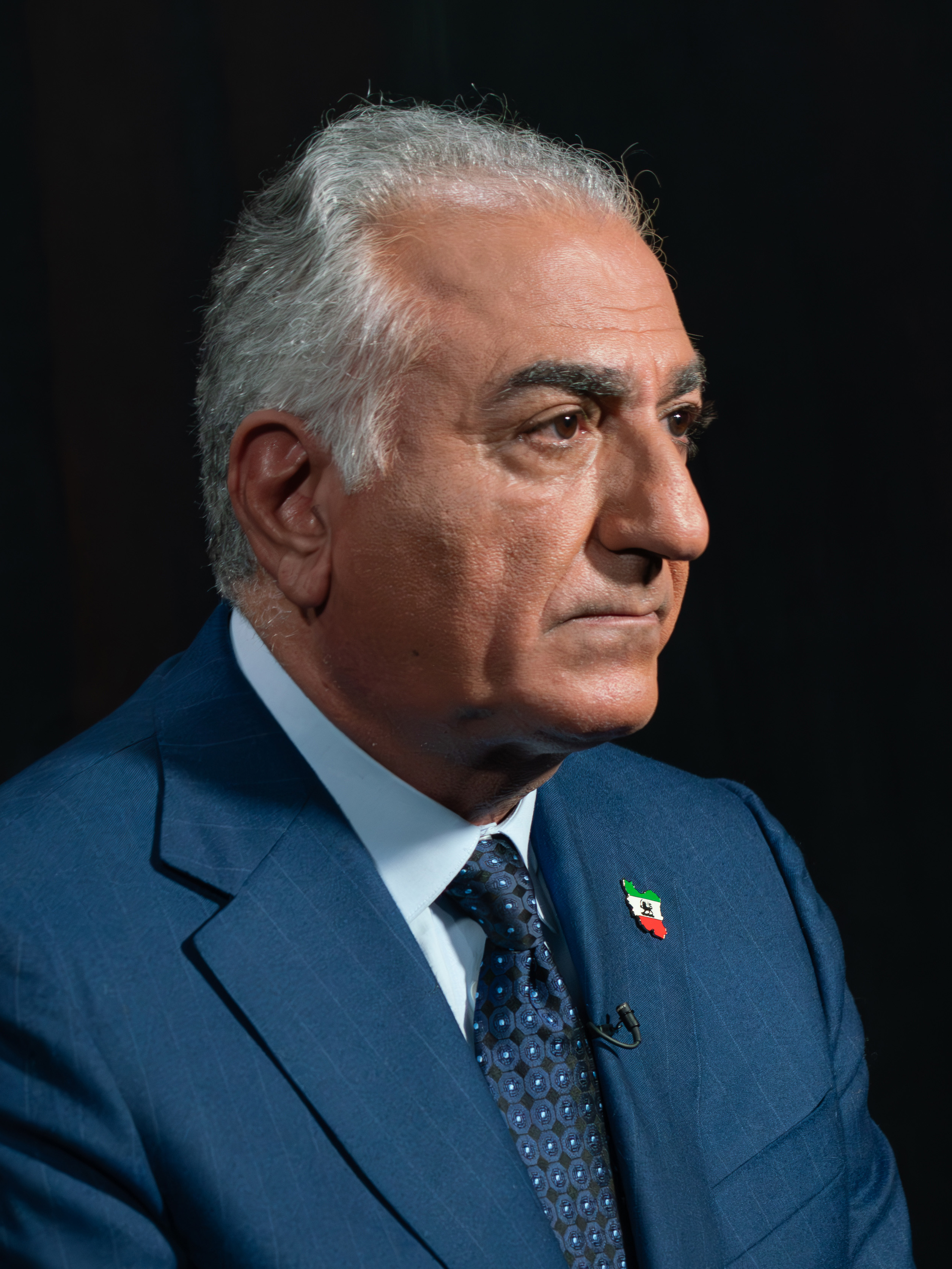
Exiled Iranian opposition leader Reza Pahlavi is aligned with Israel and the United States and has prepared a transitional government that he says is ready to take over should the Islamic Republic be overthrown.

Celebratory rallies were held worldwide by the Iranian opposition, especially in Europe and North America. Many Iranians residing in Japan expressed support for regime change in public rallies or interviews with local media. Maryam Rajavi, leader of the France–Albania based National Council of Resistance of Iran, the political wing of People's Mojahedin Organization of Iran, announced the formation of a rival transitional government and rejected both the Islamic Republic and the Iran Prosperity Project.

Reza Pahlavi, the US-based exiled son of the former Shah of Iran, urged Iranians inside Iran to prepare to resume protests as the Islamic Republic "colapses", called on military and security forces to side with the public over the government, and described US action against Iran as a "humanitarian intervention" while urging Trump to avoid civilian harm. Pahlavi stated that he did not intend to seek political office or restore the monarchy, but aimed instead to help guide Iran through a peaceful transition to a democratic system.

== United States ==
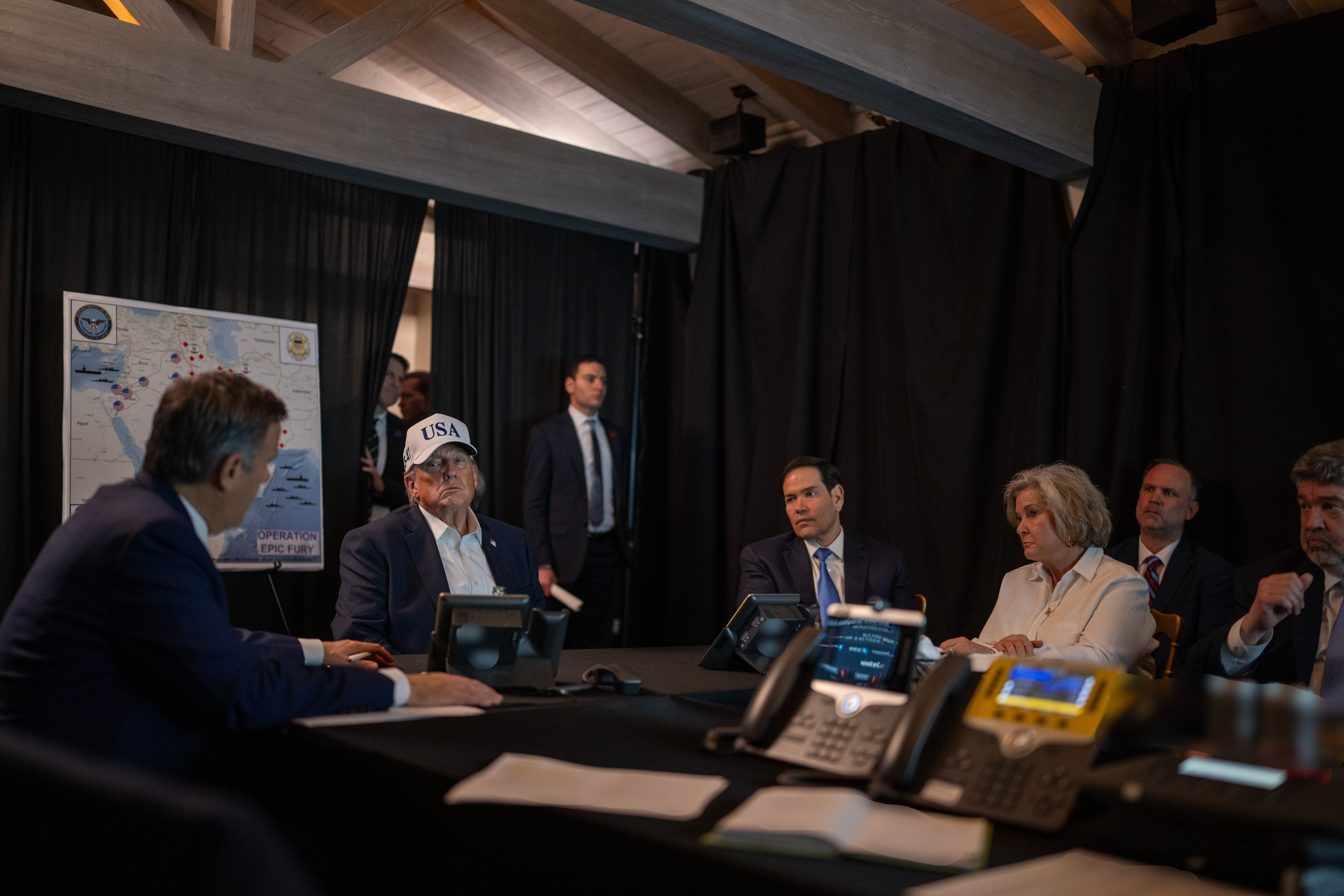
US president Trump overseeing the start of "Operation Epic Fury"

Reactions inside the US were overall negative but split along party lines, with the majority of Republicans supporting the war and the majority of Democratic and independent voters opposing it. Pundits split similarly, although some notable right-wing pundits such as Matt Walsh opposed it.

=== Government reactions to developments in the war ===
Trump wrote on 6 March: "There will be no deal with Iran except UNCONDITIONAL SURRENDER!" On 9 March, Trump said that "the war is very complete, pretty much", and falsely claimed the Iranian military had been destroyed and the Strait of Hormuz had re-opened. Five days later, he called for US allies and China to send warships to help re-open the strait. Trump went on to claim that the US and Israel had "won" the war several times, while continuing to say that the US had not yet completed its objectives. He denied that he had ever called for regime change. The president also repeatedly claimed that Iran's military had been destroyed, despite it continuing to launch attacks.

In late March and early April, Trump repeatedly gave ultimatums to Iran, threatening to destroy Iran's civilian infrastructure and bombing it "back to the Stone Ages" if it did not make a deal with the US and re-open the Hormuz strait. On 7 April, the president threatened that "a whole civilization will die tonight". Following the failed Islamabad Talks, Trump said that he "doesn't care" about negotiations, and announced that the US itself would impose a naval blockade of Iran from 13 April. Trump said on 17 April that the Hormuz strait is "COMPLETELY OPEN", but on 23 April Trump claimed that he is the one keeping it closed, because opening it would allow Iran to make "$500 million a day". In March 2026, Trump indicated that he and Director of National Intelligence Tulsi Gabbard differ on their approach to Iran and its nuclear program, labeling her as "softer" on the issue. In May 2026, Gabbard announced her resignation effective June 30, stating that she needs to care for her husband following his diagnosis with a rare form of bone cancer. According to a source familiar with her departure, she was compelled to leave by the White House. In July 2026, US Vice President J.D Vance criticized conservative hawks in the US, stating that they want to topple the Iranian regime, despite the fact that US history with doing so has been negative and involves a significant commitment of ground troops.

By September 2026, a number of Republican figures had begun to break with the administration's position on the Iran war and to call for its conclusion. On September 21, Ashley Hinson — an Iowa representative and the Republican nominee for the Senate — urged that the conflict be brought to a "successful and immediate end." Mike Rogers, a Senate candidate from Michigan, likewise pressed for a swift conclusion, while Representative John James argued that the United States should move to wind the war down without delay.

=== Congress ===
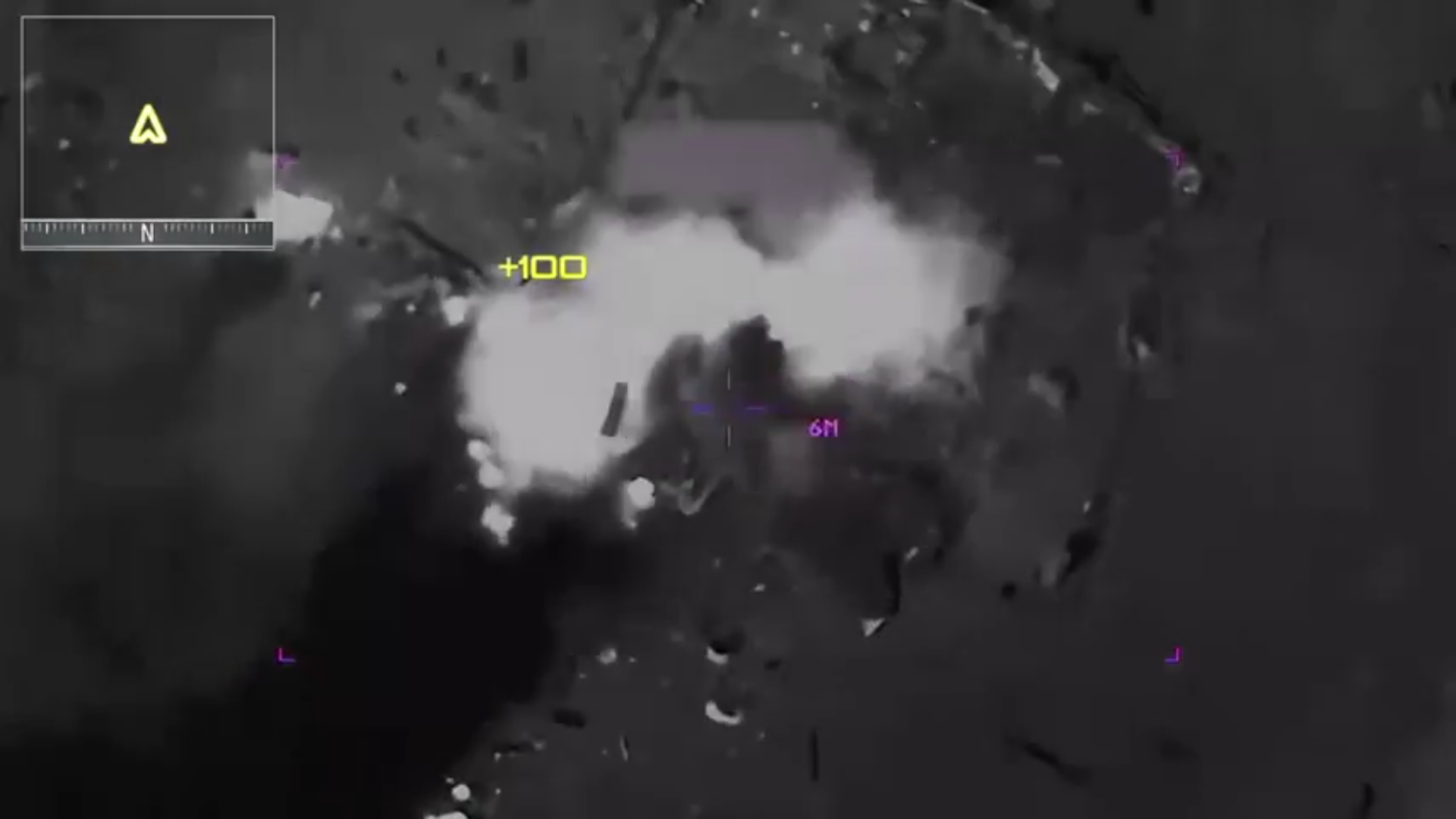
Strike footage with computer game points added by the White House

American lawmakers had mixed reactions. Republican senator Lindsey Graham supported the action, justifying the strikes as "in the nick of time" to prevent Iran from acquiring a nuclear weapon. In a Fox News interview, he said, "I'm going back to South Carolina, I am asking them to send their sons and daughters to the Mideast. What I want you to do in the Mideast, my friends in Saudi Arabia and other places, step forward and say this is my fight too."

Other Republican Senators supported the attacks, including Senate majority leader John Thune, as well as some Democrats, including Senator John Fetterman and Representative Josh Gottheimer. A few Republicans opposed the operation, including Representative Thomas Massie and former representative Marjorie Taylor Greene.

In the House, Speaker Mike Johnson said that Israel would have attacked Iran even without US help, with "devastating" consequences. Johnson called US involvement "absolutely necessary for our defense". Similar declarations came from Marco Rubio affirming that the US knew that Israel was planning to attack and that the US acted to avoid higher casualties. Critics of Israel denounced this as US strategy that is increasingly shaped by Israeli military decisions. Rubio said that the leadership is the problem and not the people. He said that the goals of the war were to degrade Iranian military capabilities and to make sure that they did not control the Strait of Hormuz. Republican senator Rand Paul denounced the attacks.

Democratic politicians tended to be more withdrawn. Representative Jim Himes stated, "Everything I have heard from the administration before and after these strikes on Iran confirms this is a war of choice with no strategic endgame." Senator Mark Warner, after attending a classified briefing on the war, denied any immediate threat. Senator Tim Kaine called for a check on Trump's power to engage in war without the support of Congress and was supported by Democratic Minority Leader Chuck Schumer who said that the answers at the classified briefing were "completely and totally insufficient", House minority leader Hakeem Jeffries, and Democratic senator Andy Kim concurred.

Congress members introduced a resolution under the War Powers Resolution, that would have stifled the war. Drafting began before the first strikes. The resolution would have stopped US attacks after sixty days (with an extra thirty if Trump wrote to Congress) without a Congressional war declaration. The resolutions failed in both Houses.

On 18 April, US congressman Greg Steube said that the US was in charge of the situation and would ensure that Iran does not get a nuclear weapon.

As the US Defense Secretary Hegseth was asking the Senate Appropriations Committee on 22 July for an urgent $87 billion for the Pentagon, the hearing was interrupted many times by protests and culminated with a shouting match between Hegseth and Democratic senators.

On September 15, 2026, the U.S. House of Representatives passed a war powers resolution by a vote of 220–204, with seven Republicans — among them Mariannette Miller-Meeks of Iowa — siding with Democrats in support. The measure would have required the withdrawal of U.S. forces from hostilities against Iran absent congressional authorization, while carving out an exception for defensive operations to protect American and allied bases. Miller-Meeks, who had opposed earlier resolutions of the same kind, said the president owed Congress and the public a plan for ending the war, pointing to the risk of an open-ended conflict and to rising fuel prices.

=== Local officials ===
California governor Gavin Newsom condemned the attacks, accusing Israel of dragging the United States into a long war.

Northern Mariana Islands governor David M. Apatang praised Trump's actions and congratulated him for "doing what you needed to do", saying that he prayed for the safe return of US service members.

=== Pundits ===
Some right-wing commentators condemned the operation. The Daily Wire host Matt Walsh called the Trump administration's messaging "confusing" and contradictory. Walsh and Andrew Tate described armed conflict as irrelevant to the needs of the American people.

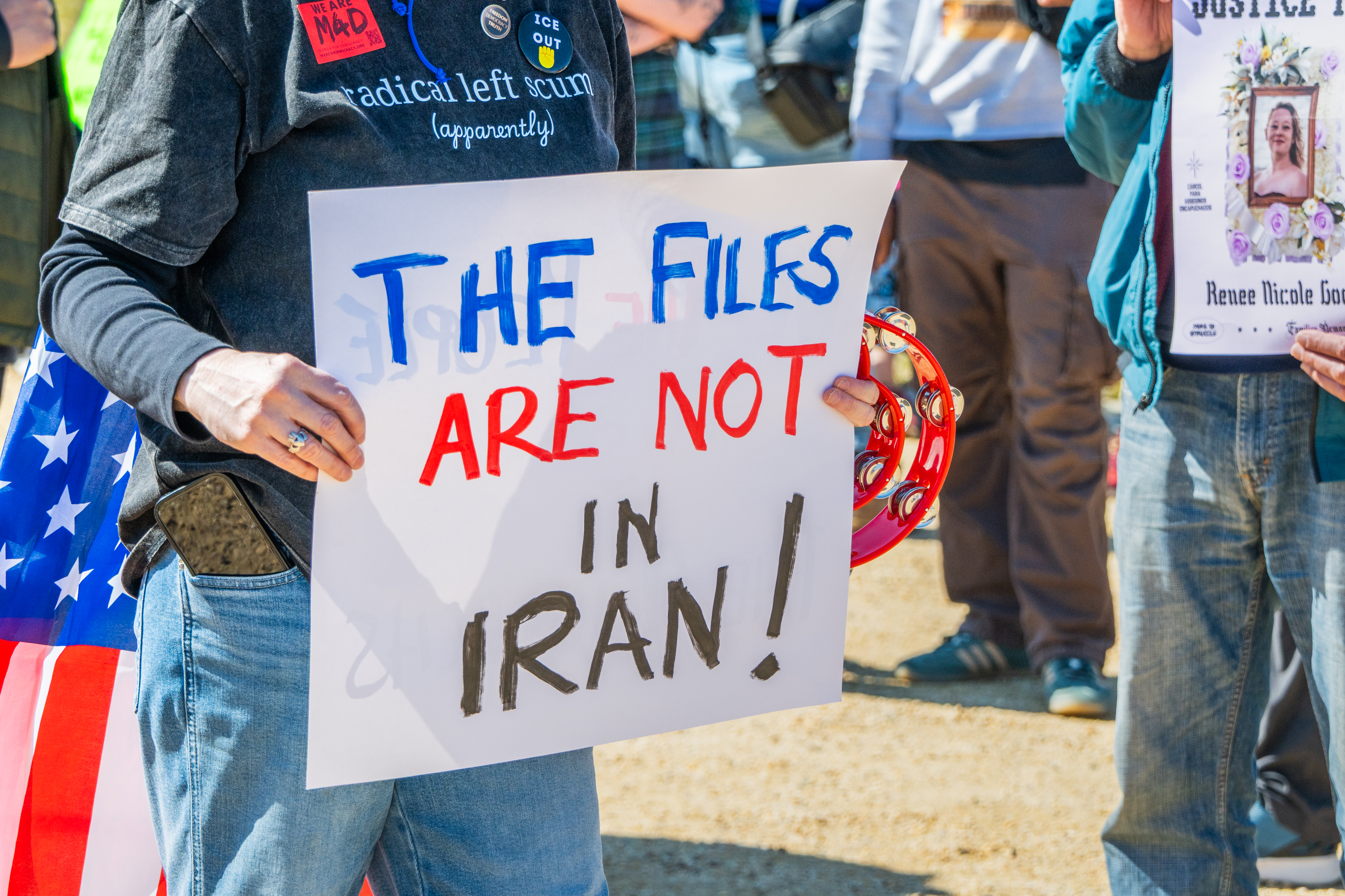
Protester on 28 February 2026, in Washington D.C. promoting the theory that the war was a distraction from the Jeffrey Epstein investigation

Other Trump critics, including some social media influencers and users, claimed that the war was an attempt at distraction from the Epstein files, satirically referring to the war as the "Epstein War" and "Operation Epstein Fury", the latter a play on "Operation Epic Fury".

On 17 March, Joe Kent resigned as the director of the National Counterterrorism Center, citing policy disagreements with the Trump administration regarding the war in Iran.

On April 5, The Wall Street Journal published an editorial in support of the strikes on Iran, characterizing them as a reasonable decision from Trump after failed diplomatic efforts and arguing that other options presented a risk of permitting Iran to develop nuclear weaponry.

Former CIA analyst Ken Pollack warned that the worst possible outcome could be if the war ended without toppling the Iranian government.

== Israel ==
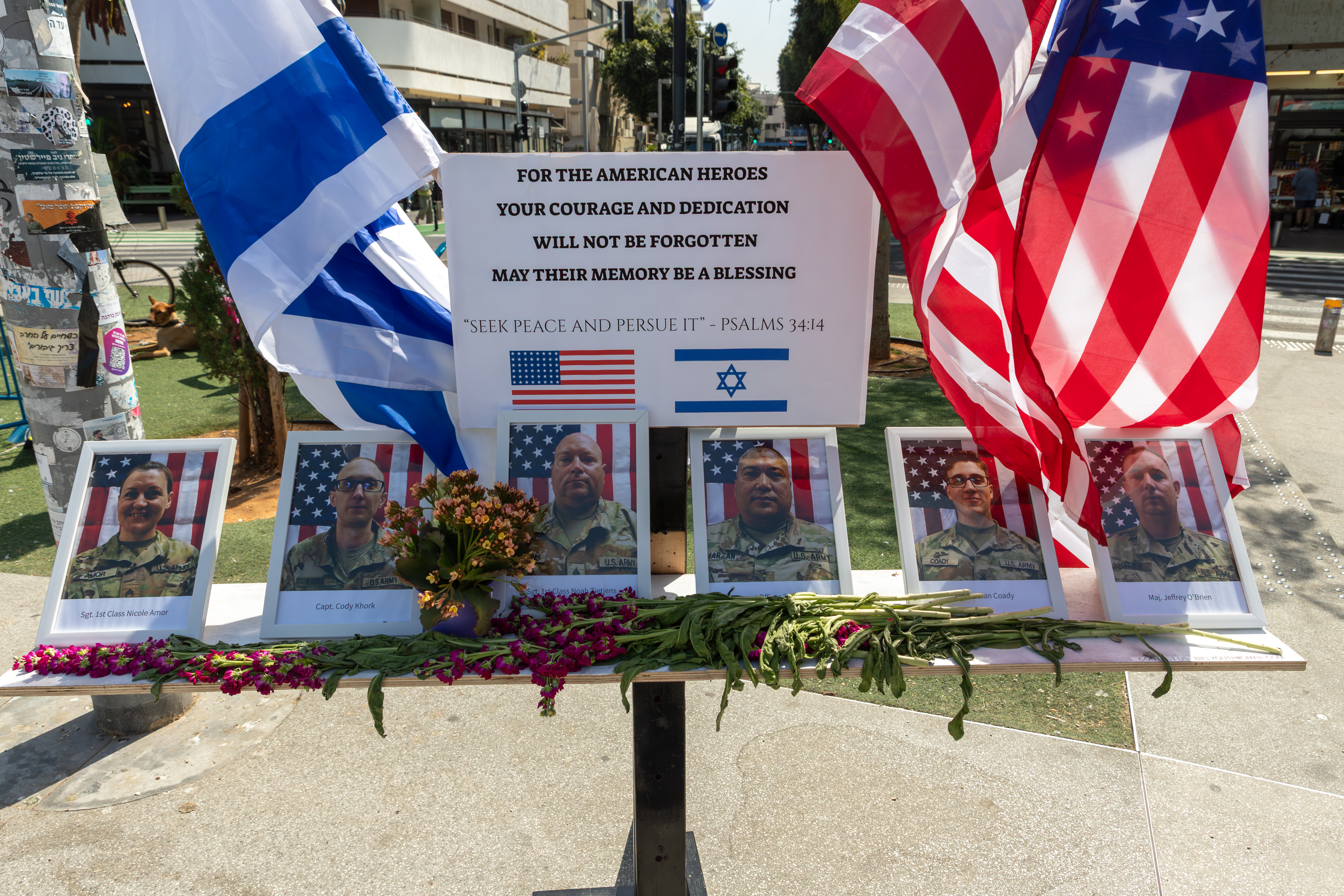
Israelis pay tribute to US troops at a memorial in Dizengoff Square, Tel Aviv, following the 1 March 2026 drone strike in Kuwait

Prime Minister Benjamin Netanyahu was the first to announce that Khamenei had been assassinated, stating "for 47 years, the Ayatollah regime has chanted 'Death to Israel' and 'Death to America.' It has spilled our blood, murdered many Americans, and slaughtered its own people." Defense Minister Israel Katz said: "he who acted to destroy Israel – has been destroyed ... Justice has been served, and the axis of evil has suffered a mortal blow." On 29 March, Knesset member Yuli Edelstein of Likud said that the strikes had set Iran back by years, but they had not yet succeeded in removing the Iranian threat. Israeli opposition leaders also supported the strikes.

== International ==
The IAEA Board of Governors convened an emergency meeting as requested by the Russian Federation on 2 March. IAEA expressed "deep concern" amid attacks on Iranian nuclear facilities, including the Bushehr Nuclear Power Plant. The head of the World Health Organization condemned the attacks. The secretary general of Amnesty International described such actions as potential war crimes.

According to the founding chief prosecutor of the International Criminal Court (ICC) Luis Moreno Ocampo, the war was comparable to Russia's war in Ukraine, adding that the world is going from a "rules-based system" to the "rule of the man", which was "not a viable world".

European Commission president Ursula von der Leyen and Council president Antonio Costa called the conflict "greatly concerning" and urged restraint. On 1 March 2026 Von der Leyen advocated a "credible transition" of power. After Trump's threats to destroy Iranian infrastructure if the Strait of Hormuz was not reopened on 5 April, Costa denounced "any targeting of civilian infrastructure, namely energy facilities" as illegal and called for a diplomatic solution only.

A spokesperson stated that NATO was closely watching, while a senior official stated that NATO's vigilance was heightened. NATO secretary general Mark Rutte said that Europe is supportive of the war, as Iran was a threat. He also said that he felt that the US "knows what it is doing".

Support for the Israeli–United States actions was voiced by countries such as Argentina, Australia, Canada, Ukraine, Germany, Paraguay, Papua New Guinea, and Uganda, as well as various EU member states. Other countries made less explicit statements of support.

The war was condemned by progressive and left-wing parties, trade unions, as well as anti-war organizations. The communist parties of the US, Iran, and Israel issued a joint statement opposing the attack. Some far-right movements in the European Conservatives and Reformists Group (such as AfD, Vlaams Belang, ANO, National Rally, Brothers of Italy, etc.) criticized the war as being against international law and the national interests of European countries, while others (such as Vox, Reform UK, Fidesz, Law and Justice) supported the actions in the name of the free world.

After initially opposing war, on 16 March, Gulf countries urged the US to neutralise Iran due to Iranian strikes on their territories. On 19 March, several Arab states asked for a discussion in the UN Human Rights Council to discuss Iran's strikes on civilians and energy infrastructure in the region.

Iran's retaliations were condemned by Bahrain, Cyprus, Egypt, India, Kuwait, the Palestinian Authority, Qatar, Saudi Arabia, Syria, Turkey, the UAE, several other EU countries, as well as by France, Germany, and the United Kingdom, who issued a joint declaration. The United Kingdom permitted the US to use British military bases for defensive purposes. Portugal permitted the US to use Lajes Field for defensive purposes, and France sent its aircraft carrier towards the Mediterranean. Ireland, Slovenia, and Vatican City. In addition to condemnations, Spain denied the use of its military bases for US flights connected to the offensive. On 20 March 2026, the UK approved the US to use British bases to attack Iranian missile sites targeting vessels in the Strait ‌of Hormuz.

Canada abstained from joining in US-led Israel war in Iran. On 5 March 2026, France authorized the use of French bases. Mixed reactions or calls for peace were made by South Africa, Azerbaijan, Lebanon.

In Pakistan, the army was deployed to suppress an escalation of violence during pro-Iranian protests in the northern cities of Gilgit and Skardu, especially after Shiite demonstrators attacked on 1 March the offices of the UN Military Observer Group at Azad Kashmir. Similar action was taken in Sindh during the attack on the US consulate in Karachi. There have been movements between Saudi Arabia and Pakistan due to the Strategic Mutual Defence Agreement between both countries, as it "states that any aggression against either country shall be considered an aggression against both".

On 11 March 2026, the United Nations Security Council passed Resolution 2817, sponsored by Bahrain, which called for Iran to stop its attack on Gulf states and condemned the strikes as a violation of international law. The resolution did not mention US–Israel strikes on Iran and Lebanon.

=== States ===
==== Africa ====
- Algeria: The Foreign Ministry condemned the attacks on Iran, calling them a "flagrant violation of sovereignty" and "an American-Zionist aggression." Algeria later cosponsored United Nations Security Council Resolution 2817, condemning Iran's retaliatory attacks on the Gulf states.
- Angola: The Press Office of the President issued a statement stating that government is following the escalation with "deep concern" and called for "maximum restraint" and dialogue to cease hostilities.
- Benin: Benin cosponsored United Nations Security Council Resolution 2817, condemning Iran's retaliatory attacks on the Gulf states.
- Botswana: The government issued a statement on 17 March denying rumors that Botswana was hosting U.S. forces in the Thebephatshwa Air Base in Kweneng District, saying that the Botswana Defence Force is in full control of the base and that misinformation could put national security at risk. In the same statement, Botswana reaffirmed its commitment to regional cooperation, dialogue, and mutual respect, adding that it values good relationships with all its neighbors.
- Cape Verde: President José Maria Neves said that Cape Verde has always appealed for the respect to the sovereignty of countries and international law, adding that wars "never solve problems." The Ministry of Economy warned about the impact on business and that the country counts with the support of Portugal and other countries from the UE in case of requiring assistance. Cape Verde later cosponsored United Nations Security Council Resolution 2817, condemning Iran's retaliatory attacks on the Gulf states.
- Central African Republic: The Central African Republic cosponsored United Nations Security Council Resolution 2817, condemning Iran's retaliatory attacks on the Gulf states.
- Chad: President Mahamat Déby expressed sympathy for Iran following the attack by Israel and the United States and offered his condolences to the Islamic Republic of Iran following the announcement of the death of its supreme leader. He said that he was sending his "most sincere and heartfelt condolences" for the killing of Khamenei and that he shared "the pain of the Iranian nation in the face of this difficult ordeal". Chad later cosponsored United Nations Security Council Resolution 2817, condemning Iran's retaliatory attacks on the Gulf states.
- Comoros: The Comoros cosponsored United Nations Security Council Resolution 2817, condemning Iran's retaliatory attacks on the Gulf states.
- Djibouti: The Ministry of Foreign Affairs and International Cooperation condemned Iran's retaliatory attacks in territory of the Gulf states, arguing that such states called for peace and were not seeking war, urging for an immediate de-escalation and a return to dialogue. Shortly after the president Ismaïl Omar Guelleh, while reaffirming alignment with Saudi Arabia by granting them access to military facilities, warned Somaliland about the possibility of establishing an Israeli base in Berbera saying that would threaten regional stability across the Horn of Africa and the neutrality of the Red Sea countries in the Israel-Houthi conflict, accusing both Israel and the UAE of driving strategic realignments across Northeast Africa that intensify the risk of current conflicts (like the Somali Civil War, Sudanese Civil War, Insurgency in Chad, Libyan crisis) and possibly merging them with the Yemeni civil war and the 2026 Iran war. Djibouti later cosponsored United Nations Security Council Resolution 2817, condemning Iran's retaliatory attacks on the Gulf states.
- DR Congo: The government called for restraint and responsibility while seeking a peaceful solution. The DR Congo later cosponsored United Nations Security Council Resolution 2817, condemning Iran's retaliatory attacks on the Gulf states.
- Egypt: President Abdel Fattah el-Sisi stated his full support for the Gulf states against Iranian aggression, warning from further escalation. Egypt later cosponsored United Nations Security Council Resolution 2817, condemning Iran's retaliatory attacks on the Gulf states.
- Equatorial Guinea: Equatorial Guinea cosponsored United Nations Security Council Resolution 2817, condemning Iran's retaliatory attacks on the Gulf states.
- eSwatini: eSwatini cosponsored United Nations Security Council Resolution 2817, condemning Iran's retaliatory attacks on the Gulf states.
- Ethiopia: Ethiopia cosponsored United Nations Security Council Resolution 2817, condemning Iran's retaliatory attacks on the Gulf states.
- Gabon: Gabon cosponsored United Nations Security Council Resolution 2817, condemning Iran's retaliatory attacks on the Gulf states.
- The Gambia: President Adama Barrow held a phone call with the leaders of Kuwait, the UAE, and Jordan, expressing support in face of the Iranian attacks. Gambia later cosponsored United Nations Security Council Resolution 2817, condemning Iran's retaliatory attacks on the Gulf states.
- Ghana: Ghana cosponsored United Nations Security Council Resolution 2817, condemning Iran's retaliatory attacks on the Gulf states.
- Kenya: President William Ruto called for de-escalation and condemned the Iranian strikes on its neighbours. Kenya later cosponsored United Nations Security Council Resolution 2817, condemning Iran's retaliatory attacks on the Gulf states.
- Lesotho: Lesotho cosponsored United Nations Security Council Resolution 2817, condemning Iran's retaliatory attacks on the Gulf states.
- Liberia: The government called for restraint and responsibility while seeking a peaceful solution. Liberia later cosponsored United Nations Security Council Resolution 2817, condemning Iran's retaliatory attacks on the Gulf states.
- Libya: Libya's foreign ministry condemned both the U.S.–Israeli strikes on Iran and the Iranian retaliatory strikes on several Arab states, stating that they constitute a breach of the principles of good neighborliness and respect for state sovereignty as stipulated in international law. Libya later cosponsored United Nations Security Council Resolution 2817, condemning Iran's retaliatory attacks on the Gulf states.
- Mauritania: Mauritania cosponsored United Nations Security Council Resolution 2817, condemning Iran's retaliatory attacks on the Gulf states.
- Morocco: The Ministry of Foreign Affairs condemned the Iranian retaliatory strikes on several Arab states and reaffirmed Morocco's "solidarity with the brotherly Arab states in all legitimate measures they take to respond to this attack and protect their security". The royal cabinet released a statement saying that King Mohammed VI conversed with the leaders of the United Arab Emirates, Bahrain, Qatar and Saudi Arabia by telephone to express his condemnation. Morocco later cosponsored United Nations Security Council Resolution 2817, condemning Iran's retaliatory attacks on the Gulf states.
- Namibia: the secretary general of SWAPO, Namibia's current ruling party, said the American-Israeli attack was "unjustified aggression and an illegal military operation".
- Nigeria: Anti-American protests have been instigated in Nigeria by Islamic Movement, which increased fears of plots against Israeli and US interests in the country.
- Rwanda: Rwanda cosponsored United Nations Security Council Resolution 2817, condemning Iran's retaliatory attacks on the Gulf states.
- Sao Tome and Principe: São Tomé and Príncipe cosponsored United Nations Security Council Resolution 2817, condemning Iran's retaliatory attacks on the Gulf states.
- Senegal: Senegal cosponsored United Nations Security Council Resolution 2817, condemning Iran's retaliatory attacks on the Gulf states.
- Seychelles: The Ministry of Foreign Affairs expressed "deep concern" at the conflict and regretted the loss of life, calling on all parties involved to show maximum restraint.
- Sierra Leone: Sierra Leone cosponsored United Nations Security Council Resolution 2817, condemning Iran's retaliatory attacks on the Gulf states.
- Somalia: Somalia condemned the Iranian attacks on all Gulf states except for the UAE. It also called for restraint and responsibility while seeking a peaceful solution. Somalia later cosponsored United Nations Security Council Resolution 2817, condemning Iran's retaliatory attacks on the Gulf states.
- Somaliland: President Abdirahman Mohamed Abdullahi held a phone call with Prime Minister Netanyahu, expressing concern at the unfolding events and calling for the protection of civilians. Abdullahi also condemned Iran's strikes on its neighbours.
- South Africa: Without mentioning any involved parties by name, on 28 February, president Cyril Ramaphosa called on the international community to "redouble efforts" regarding restraint and adherence to international law in the Middle East, with specific reference to Article 51 of the UN Charter.
- South Sudan: The Ministry of Foreign Affairs issued a statement condemning the Iranian attacks on Gulf states, Turkey, Cyprus, and Azerbaijan, expressing solidarity to those countries and calling the Iranian strikes a violation of international law. South Sudan later cosponsored United Nations Security Council Resolution 2817, condemning Iran's retaliatory attacks on the Gulf states.
- Sudan: President Abdel Fattah al-Burhan condemned the Iranian strikes on Gulf states, warning that the Sudanese Armed Forces (SAF) would confront a radical group within the SAF calling to support Iran in case of a ground invasion. Al-Burhan said that Sudan "stands in full solidarity" with its Gulf allies and added that he will not allow any group to speak in the name of SAF on matters that "do not concern them."
- Togo: Togo cosponsored United Nations Security Council Resolution 2817, condemning Iran's retaliatory attacks on the Gulf states.
- Tunisia: The Tunisian foreign ministry expressed its "absolute rejection" of any aggression against Arab countries and expressed full solidarity with Saudi Arabia, Kuwait, Qatar, Bahrain, the United Arab Emirates, Jordan, and Iraq. Tunisia later cosponsored United Nations Security Council Resolution 2817, condemning Iran's retaliatory attacks on the Gulf states.
- Uganda: The Chief of Defence Forces Muhoozi Kainerugaba, who is a son of President Yoweri Museveni, stated on 26 March that Uganda will join the war "on the side of Israel" if the conflict does not end. He added that Iran must stop attacks on Israel, citing Israel's right to exist. Kainerugaba also said that Tehran "could have fallen within 72 hours without a bombing", but that they "never listen to a black man." Uganda later cosponsored United Nations Security Council Resolution 2817, condemning Iran's retaliatory attacks on the Gulf states.
- Zambia: The government co-sponsored a Bahrain-led UN Security Council resolution condemning Iranian strikes on its neighbours, calling them "egregious."

==== Asia ====
- Afghanistan: The foreign ministry said that recent US and Israeli strikes on Iran would have "long-term negative consequences" for the region, as hostilities continued to escalate (the Taliban regime is also fighting a concurrent war against Pakistan at the same time). In a statement, the Taliban expressed what it called "deep regret" over the attacks on Iran. Foreign Minister Amir Khan Muttaqi denounced the aggression against Iran and extended condolences to the Iranian government and people over the targeting of Khamenei.
- Armenia: The government and foreign ministry condemned Israel's "unilateral attack", calling it "deeply concerning".
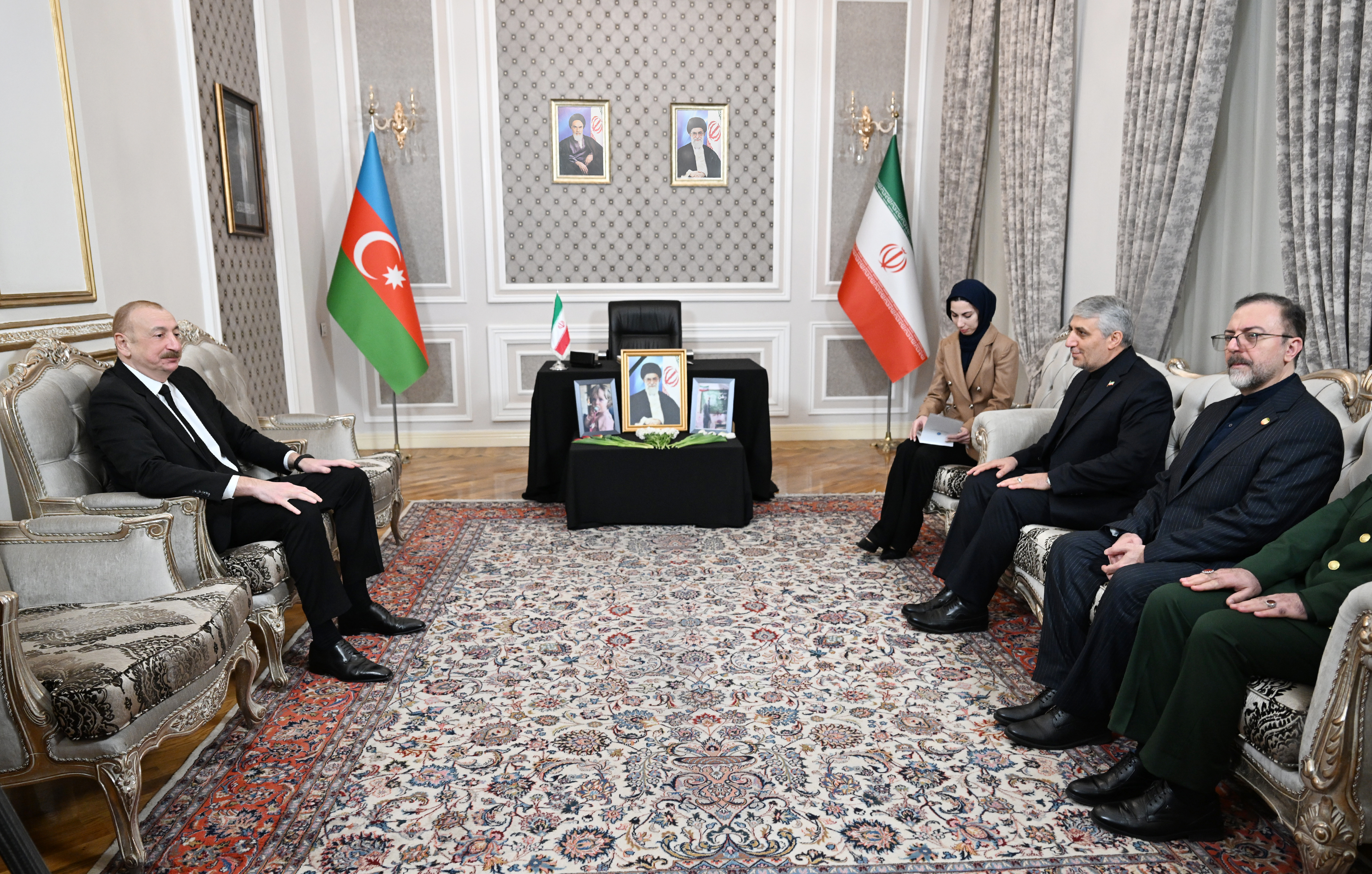
  Azerbaijani president Ilham Aliyev visiting the Iranian Embassy in Baku to offer condolences for the death of Ali Khamenei, 4 March 2026
- Azerbaijan: In an official statement, the Ministry of Foreign Affairs called on all parties to exercise maximum restraint and return to the negotiating table. The Ministry emphasized the importance of respecting the sovereignty, territorial integrity, and independence of all states in accordance with the UN Charter.
- Bangladesh: In an official statement, the Foreign Ministry expressed deep concern over the safety of Bangladeshis in the Middle East, and called all parties to exercise maximum restrain and return to diplomacy to resolve the differences. The statement also condemned Iran's retaliatory strikes as "violation of sovereignty" of Gulf countries. The statement was criticized as "one-sided" for not condemning Israel and the US. The following day, the foreign ministry condemned the assassination of Khamenei, calling it a "violation of international law and norms." Bangladesh later cosponsored United Nations Security Council Resolution 2817, condemning Iran's retaliatory attacks on the Gulf states.
- Bhutan: Bhutan cosponsored United Nations Security Council Resolution 2817, condemning Iran's retaliatory attacks on the Gulf states.
- Brunei: The Ministry of Foreign Affairs "strongly condemned" the United States and Israeli attacks on Iran, calling them a serious violation of sovereignty and a threat to regional stability. Brunei later cosponsored United Nations Security Council Resolution 2817, condemning Iran's retaliatory attacks on the Gulf states.
- Cambodia: The Foreign Ministry called on all parties to exercise maximum restraint to avoid further escalation that would harm civilian lives and undermine peace."
- China: The foreign ministry expressed concerns about the US and Israeli strikes, called for an immediate end to hostilities against Iran, and to resume dialogue. It also stressed that Iranian sovereignty must be respected. Foreign Minister Wang Yi condemned the attack by saying "blatant killing of a sovereign leader" and incitement of regime change were "unacceptable". On 1 March, the foreign ministry stated that the killing of Khamenei is "a grave violation of Iran's sovereignty and security", which tramples on the purposes and principles of the UN Charter and basic norms in international relations. Foreign Minister Wang Yi cautioned against efforts to change the government in Iran, emphasizing the lack of popular support such actions. Wang also called for the immediate cessation of military operation in the Middle East, stressing the need to respect Iran's sovereignty, saying "This is a war that should not have happened, and it is a war that does no one any good".
- Georgia: Georgia cosponsored United Nations Security Council Resolution 2817, condemning Iran's retaliatory attacks on the Gulf states.
- India: The Ministry for External Affairs expressed its concerns and requested all three nations for a ceasefire. Prime Minister Narendra Modi, spoke with Gulf leaders (Note: Namely King Abdullah II, King Hamad bin Isa Al Khalifa, and Crown Prince Mohammed bin Salman.) and condemned the strikes and attack on sovereignty without mentioning Iran. Modi also spoke with the Israeli PM. The Indian government did not condemn the assassination of Khamenei, just like in similar previous cases. However, Foreign Secretary Vikram Misri signed a condolence book a few days later without mentioning any background of Khamenei's demise. India later cosponsored United Nations Security Council Resolution 2817, condemning Iran's retaliatory attacks on the Gulf states.
- Indonesia: The Ministry of Foreign Affairs issued a statement regretting the failure of negotiations between Iran and the United States. In a call to Iranian Foreign Minister Abbas Araghchi, Indonesian Foreign Minister Sugiono stated President Prabowo Subianto's willingness to travel to Tehran in an attempt to mediate the conflict. Amid escalating Middle East tensions, Indonesia paused its engagement with the US-initiated Board of Peace, as domestic calls for withdrawal intensified following the US-Israel attacks on Iran.
- Japan: Prime Minister Sanae Takaichi announced on X that "we will prepare for any potential risks, and handle it in the best possible way that we can." Takaichi also emphasized during the House of Representatives Budget Committee that "Japan's consistent position is that Iran's development of nuclear weapons can never be tolerated" and urged Iran to cease hostilities. She did not make any statements over the actions taken by Israel and the United States. Defense Minister Shinjirō Koizumi also announced that preparations were being made to evacuate Japanese expats in the region by the Self-Defense Forces. On 5 March, Prime Minister Takaichi condemned the Iranian attacks against civilian facilities. As of 5 April, the government has refrained from assessing whether the US-Israeli attacks violate international law. Japan later cosponsored United Nations Security Council Resolution 2817, condemning Iran's retaliatory attacks on the Gulf states.
- Kazakhstan: President Kassym-Jomart Tokayev ordered the Security Council to ensure domestic stability following the strikes, while the ministry of foreign affairs expressed solidarity with Gulf states and condemned Iranian retaliatory actions.
- Laos: The Ministry of Foreign Affairs expressed "grave concern" over the escalating violence in the Middle East, urging those involved to exercise restraint and seek a peaceful solution.
- Malaysia: Malaysia officially condemned the joint U.S.-Israeli strikes on Iran and retaliatory Iranian strikes in the region, calling for de-escalation. Prime Minister Anwar Ibrahim expressed a stronger stance, "unreservedly" condemning the assassination of Ali Khamenei, describing it as a "vile attempt" to destroy regional stability. He further accused Israel of lacking humanity and moved to table a parliamentary motion to condemn the attack. Malaysia later cosponsored United Nations Security Council Resolution 2817, condemning Iran's retaliatory attacks on the Gulf states.
- Maldives: President Mohamed Muizzu condemned attacks by all sides while expressing support for the Arab nations attacked by Iran. The Maldives later cosponsored United Nations Security Council Resolution 2817, condemning Iran's retaliatory attacks on the Gulf states.
- Myanmar: Myanmar cosponsored United Nations Security Council Resolution 2817, condemning Iran's retaliatory attacks on the Gulf states.
- North Korea: A spokesperson for the Ministry of Foreign Affairs condemned Israel's and the United States' attacks as "illegal aggression" that "constitute the most heinous form of violation of sovereignty". The spokesperson added that "the Democratic People's Republic of Korea condemns in the strongest terms the shameless and gangster-like behaviour of the United States and Israel, who do not hesitate to abuse military force to achieve their selfish and hegemonic ambitions, placing domestic law above recognized international law", stating the "war of aggression" cannot be justified.
- Pakistan: Pakistan's Deputy Prime Minister and Foreign Minister Ishaq Dar condemned the Israeli and American strikes on Iran. He also stated he reminded Iran of the mutual defense agreement they signed with Saudi Arabia in September 2025. Pakistan later cosponsored United Nations Security Council Resolution 2817, condemning Iran's retaliatory attacks on the Gulf states.
- Philippines: President Bongbong Marcos called for a ceasefire in the Middle East and expressed support for "the countries that have come under attack".
- Singapore: The Ministry of Foreign Affairs said that it "regrets the failure of negotiations", calling on parties involved to return to negotiations to achieve a peaceful solution", citing international law and the UN charter. Singapore later cosponsored United Nations Security Council Resolution 2817, condemning Iran's retaliatory attacks on the Gulf states.
- South Korea: South Korea cosponsored United Nations Security Council Resolution 2817, condemning Iran's retaliatory attacks on the Gulf states.
- Thailand said it was "closely monitoring the situation with grave concern." The National Human Rights Commission of Thailand condemned the attacks on Iran, particularly the Minab school attack.
- Timor-Leste: Timor-Leste cosponsored United Nations Security Council Resolution 2817, condemning Iran's retaliatory attacks on the Gulf states.
- Turkmenistan: The government of Turkmenistan, which adheres to a strong neutral international position, called the outbreak of the war "regrettable" and called for a diplomatic solution to solve the problem. The government of Turkmenistan, one of the most strict countries in travel visa regulations, opened safe ways for foreigners in Iran, especially Russians, to enter Turkmenistan as a route of evacuation.
- Uzbekistan: The ministry of foreign affairs expressed "serious concern" over the escalation of hostilities, urging all parties to exercise maximum restraint and seek a diplomatic resolution to prevent further regional instability. Uzbekistan later cosponsored United Nations Security Council Resolution 2817, condemning Iran's retaliatory attacks on the Gulf states.
- Vietnam: The spokesperson of the Ministry of Foreign Affairs formally reiterated the state's opposition to the use of force against sovereign nations, without explicitly mentioning any side of the conflict.

===== Middle East =====
- Bahrain: Bahrain condemned the Iranian strikes on the headquarters of the US Navy Fifth Fleet which it hosts, calling it a "treacherous attack" and a "blatant violation of the kingdom's sovereignty and security". According to diplomats, Bahrain privately supports a U.S. ground invasion of Iran. Bahrain later cosponsored United Nations Security Council Resolution 2817, condemning Iran's retaliatory attacks on the Gulf states.
- Iraq: The spokesperson for the Iraqi Prime Minister condemned the assassination of Ali Khamenei and declared three days of mourning for him. Iraqi Prime Minister Mohammed Shia' al-Sudani condemned US-Israeli strikes on the PMF, calling them a "systematic and repeated aggression" and a "desperate attempt to cause chaos and hit social peace." Iraqi national security advisor Qasim al-Araji condemned the strikes on the PMF as a "cowardly terrorist attack." In response to plans of a Kurdish offensive into Iran, al-Araji said that Iraq will not allow an invasion of Iran to be launched from its territory, and stated that Iran had requested that Iraqi forces move to the border between the Iraqi Kurdistan and Iran to impede any aggression by Kurdish forces. On 26 March, Iraq condemned the attacks on Gulf Arab states and Jordan.
- Jordan: The foreign ministry of Jordan strongly condemned the Iranian ballistic missile on Jordanian territory as well as the attacks targeting Gulf Arab states, with whom it expressed its "absolute solidarity," further adding that it would take "all available and necessary measures" to safeguard its citizens and protect its security and sovereignty. Jordan later cosponsored United Nations Security Council Resolution 2817, condemning Iran's retaliatory attacks on the Gulf states.
- Kuwait: Kuwait condemned the Iranian attacks on its territory as a "flagrant violation" of international law. Later Kuwait's Emir Sheikh Mishal Al-Ahmad Al-Jaber Al-Sabah said his country is under attack by a Muslim country they consider a friend, even though Kuwait did not allow the use of our land, airspace, or waters for any military action against it. According to diplomats, Kuwait privately supports a U.S. ground invasion of Iran. Kuwait later cosponsored United Nations Security Council Resolution 2817, condemning Iran's retaliatory attacks on the Gulf states. On May 13, The Wall Street Journal reported that Kuwait had launched attacks on Iran-backed Iraqi militias, and Kuwait stated that it had engaged Iranian forces during a raid on Bubiyan Island.
- Lebanon: Prime Minister Nawaf Salam urged restraint following the Israeli strikes on Iran, stressing that Lebanon must not be dragged into a wider regional war and should prioritize its own security and stability. Salam also condemned Hezbollah's decision to join the war by attacking Israel, calling it "an irresponsible and suspicious act that jeopardizes Lebanon's security and safety and provides Israel with pretexts to continue its aggression". He also said "We will not allow the country to be dragged into new adventures". In a later interview he said "We could have avoided being impacted by the conflict were it not for the strategic error committed by Hezbollah by being dragged us into it." Lebanon later cosponsored United Nations Security Council Resolution 2817, condemning Iran's retaliatory attacks on the Gulf states.
- Oman: Foreign Minister Badr Albusaidi expressed "dismay" at the outbreak of violence in spite of the 2026 Iran–United States negotiations, urging the United States to "not get sucked in further" into the conflict, adding "this is not your war." A spokesperson for the Foreign Minister condemned the strikes, calling them illegal aggression. Oman also called for a UN Security council meeting. Badr Albusaidi claimed the United States had "lost control of its own foreign policy" and accused Israel of persuading the Trump administration to engage in a war with Iran, which he termed a "grave miscalculation" and a "catastrophe". Oman later cosponsored United Nations Security Council Resolution 2817, condemning Iran's retaliatory attacks on the Gulf states.
- Palestine: The Palestinian Authority condemned the Iranian retaliatory strikes on the Gulf Arab states, stating that it "affirms the solidarity of our people and their steadfastness alongside the sister Arab nations" and expressed support for "whatever measures" they take to defend themselves.
- Qatar: The foreign ministry strongly condemned Iran for launching missiles at Qatari territory, calling it a violation of Qatar's sovereignty and reaffirming its right to respond. On 19 March, Qatar declared members of the Iranian military and security forces as 'persona non grata', giving them 24 hours to leave the country. Qatar later cosponsored United Nations Security Council Resolution 2817, condemning Iran's retaliatory attacks on the Gulf states.
- Saudi Arabia: The foreign ministry condemned what it called "blatant and cowardly Iranian attacks" on Riyadh and Eastern Province, highlighting that the attacks took place in spite of the explicit closure of its airspace. In a statement released by the official press agency, Saudi Arabia condemned the "flagrant" and "brutal Iranian aggression" on its fellow Arab states of the UAE, Bahrain, Qatar, Kuwait, and Jordan, stating that it was a "blatant violation" of their sovereignty. Saudi Arabia claimed to have intercepted all Iranian attacks aimed at its territory and said that it would "take all necessary measures" to defend itself, "including the option of responding to aggression". Saudi Crown Prince Mohammed bin Salman urged Trump to "keep hitting the Iranians hard." Saudi Arabia later cosponsored United Nations Security Council Resolution 2817, condemning Iran's retaliatory attacks on the Gulf states. In May, Reuters reported that Saudi Arabia had launched attacks on both Iran and Iran-backed militias within Iraq.
- Syria: The Ministry of Foreign Affairs said it "strongly condemns the Iranian attacks" that targeted Saudi Arabia, the United Arab Emirates, Bahrain, Qatar, Kuwait and Jordan. Syria later cosponsored United Nations Security Council Resolution 2817, condemning Iran's retaliatory attacks on the Gulf states.
- Turkey: President Recep Tayyip Erdogan condemned both the U.S.–Israeli strikes on Iran and the Iranian retaliation on its neighbors. He also expressed his "sadness" at the assassination of Ali Khamenei and offered his condolences to the Iranian people. He later said the Israeli-US attacks were "illegal" and constituted a "clear violation of international law".
- United Arab Emirates: The defense ministry condemned the Iranian attacks on its territory in the "strongest terms", calling the attacks "a dangerous escalation and a cowardly act that threatens the security and safety of civilians", and stating that it has the "full right" to respond. The UAE also closed its embassy in Tehran and withdrew all its diplomatic mission. UAE ambassador to the U.S. Yousef al-Otaiba rejected a ceasefire as "not enough" and called on the U.S. to achieve a "conclusive outcome" against Iran, addressing Iran's "full range of threats: nuclear capabilities, missiles, drones, terror proxies and blockades of international sea lanes." According to diplomats, the UAE emerged as the most hawkish of the Gulf states and pushed Trump to launch a ground invasion of Iran.
- Yemen: The Yemeni foreign ministry condemned the Iranian targeting of oil and gas infrastructure in Saudi Arabia and other GCC states and full solidarity with the Gulf Arab states. Following the Houthi entry into the war on 28 March, the internationally recognized Yemeni government condemned Iran's "frequent attempts to drag Yemen" into conflict "through its terrorist militias," adding that "the involvement of the Houthi militias in defending the Iranian regime" shows that Iran is "pushing its agents to open other fronts" to reduce political pressure on itself. Yemen later cosponsored United Nations Security Council Resolution 2817, condemning Iran's retaliatory attacks on the Gulf states.

==== Europe ====
- Albania: Prime Minister Edi Rama expressed Albania's support for "the United States in militarily supporting Israel today under the leadership of President Donald Trump". He added that "we stand firm with Israel and with the peace-seeking brotherly Arab countries", and declared that Albania will designate the IRGC as a terrorist organization. While most European governments called for restraint following the escalation of violence in the Middle East, Albania emerged as one of the most outspoken supporters of the US-Israeli military action against Iran. This position reflects Albania's longstanding alignment with the United States, as well as its strained relations with Iran, which have been influenced by Albania's hosting of members of the exiled Iranian opposition group Mujahideen-e-Khalq (MEK) and Iran-sponsored cyberattacks against Albania. Albania later cosponsored United Nations Security Council Resolution 2817, condemning Iran's retaliatory attacks on the Gulf states.
- Andorra: The Minister of Foreign Affairs Imma Tor Faus expressed solidarity with the victims of the war and reaffirmed Andorra's commitment with peace. The government also announced that it is following the situation of more than 30 Andorran citizens stranded in the UAE and Qatar. Andorra later cosponsored United Nations Security Council Resolution 2817, condemning Iran's retaliatory attacks on the Gulf states.
- Austria: Chancellor Christian Stocker condemned Iran's attacks on Persian Gulf nations, adding that the Iranian people deserve a "life in peace, security, and prosperity." Austria later cosponsored United Nations Security Council Resolution 2817, condemning Iran's retaliatory attacks on the Gulf states.
- Belarus: President Alexander Lukashenko called "Israel’s treacherous attack on Iran with U.S. support" "unacceptable" to Belarus.
- Belgium: Foreign Minister Maxime Prévot condemned the attacks by Iran on its neighbours in the "strongest possible terms", advising Belgian nationals in the regions to seek shelter. Belgium later cosponsored United Nations Security Council Resolution 2817, condemning Iran's retaliatory attacks on the Gulf states.
- Bosnia and Herzegovina: Bosnia and Herzegovina cosponsored United Nations Security Council Resolution 2817, condemning Iran's retaliatory attacks on the Gulf states.
- Bulgaria: The foreign ministry condemned the Iranian strikes on Gulf states, describing them as a 'dangerous military escalation' for which Iran bore responsibility. It also urged Iran to cease its military actions. Bulgaria later cosponsored United Nations Security Council Resolution 2817, condemning Iran's retaliatory attacks on the Gulf states.
- Croatia: Foreign Minister Gordan Grlić-Radman called for deescalation and condemned Iran's "intransigence and lack of credibility" which resulted in the attacks by the US and Israel. Croatia later cosponsored United Nations Security Council Resolution 2817, condemning Iran's retaliatory attacks on the Gulf states.
  Message (in Greek) from President of Cyprus, Nikos Christodoulides, following the first Iranian strikes on Cyprus on 2 March 2026
- Cyprus: President Nikos Christodoulides condemned Iranian drone and missile attacks against several Arab states, describing them as violations of international law. He emphasized Cyprus's commitment to regional stability and called for immediate de-escalation and a return to diplomatic channels. Also protests started in Cyprus against the existence of British Cyprus bases, as the Cyprus–United Kingdom relations worsened, due to Cypriots fearing that the country could be dragged into the Iranian conflict if the bases are used for pro-US/Israel offensive activities instead of their declared defensive purposes. Cyprus later cosponsored United Nations Security Council Resolution 2817, condemning Iran's retaliatory attacks on the Gulf states.
- Czech Republic: Prime Minister Andrej Babiš declared the "uncontrollable Iranian nuclear programme and support for terrorism" a danger to the Czech Republic and to all of Europe, adding the Czech Republic stands by the US and Israel and expressed a belief that stability and peace will soon prevail in the region. Further during 28 February 2026, Babiš had also labelled Iranian attacks on the various Arab states a breach of their sovereignty, given they did not participate in the initial strikes. Czech president Petr Pavel condemned Iran's human rights violations, support for terrorism, and backing of Russia's war in Ukraine. The Czech Republic later cosponsored United Nations Security Council Resolution 2817, condemning Iran's retaliatory attacks on the Gulf states.
- Denmark: On 28 February, Foreign Minister Lars Løkke Rasmussen stated, "Iran's past actions are completely unacceptable," and mentioned that Danish officials are "closely monitoring" developments in the Middle East. Denmark later cosponsored United Nations Security Council Resolution 2817, condemning Iran's retaliatory attacks on the Gulf states.
- Estonia: Foreign Minister Margus Tsahkna characterized the death of Ayatollah Khamenei as a strategic blow to the Russia–Iran alliance. Estonia later cosponsored United Nations Security Council Resolution 2817, condemning Iran's retaliatory attacks on the Gulf states.
- Finland: President Alexander Stubb condemned the Iranian strikes. He said: A war with Iran could create a recession worse than Corona. Foreign Minister Elina Valtonen posted on X that Khamenei's assassination opens a window for long-awaited change in the Middle East, adding that "Iran has provided Russia with drones and missiles used in its war of aggression against Ukraine. Its non-compliance with nuclear non-proliferation agreements has been a constant threat to world peace". Finland later cosponsored United Nations Security Council Resolution 2817, condemning Iran's retaliatory attacks on the Gulf states.
- France: President Emmanuel Macron called for an emergency meeting of the United Nations Security Council. On 28 February 2026, Macron issued a joint statement with UK Prime Minister Keir Starmer and German Chancellor Friedrich Merz condemning Iranian attacks on regional countries. On 3 March, Macron said that France "cannot approve of" the strikes being conducted "outside of international law", and said that Iran bears primary responsibility, while also announcing movement of materiel into the Mediterranean. On 6 March, Macron condemned the Israeli attacks on Lebanon after an "unacceptable attack" on UNIFIL peacekeepers during a missile attack against Iranian-backed Hezbollah. France later cosponsored United Nations Security Council Resolution 2817, condemning Iran's retaliatory attacks on the Gulf states.
- Germany: Chancellor Friedrich Merz said that he was informed in advance and that deliberations were underway in a joint statement with France and the UK. Addressing concerns over the legality of military action against Iran, Merz acknowledged a "dilemma", noting that decades of reliance on international law and sanctions had proven "clearly ineffective" against the Iranian government. On 1 March, Merz labelled the Iranian government as a 'terrorist regime' responsible for decades of domestic oppression, stating that Germany shares the goal of the United States and Israel to end its 'terror'. On 24 March, President Frank-Walter Steinmeier described the U.S.–Israeli military campaign against Iran as a "politically disastrous mistake" and a "violation of international law." On 27 April, Merz remarked that "A whole nation is being humiliated by the Iranian leadership" and criticized the U.S. for having "no truly convincing strategy," prompting the U.S. to begin withdrawing its troops from Germany. Germany later cosponsored United Nations Security Council Resolution 2817, condemning Iran's retaliatory attacks on the Gulf states.
- Greece: Prime Minister Kyriakos Mitsotakis expressed support for the need to control Iran's nuclear and ballistic missiles capabilities while stressing safety for Greeks in the region. Greece later cosponsored United Nations Security Council Resolution 2817, condemning Iran's retaliatory attacks on the Gulf states.
- Hungary: Foreign Minister Péter Szijjártó emphasized that military strikes on Iran have increased the significance of the Druzhba oil pipeline. Hungary later cosponsored United Nations Security Council Resolution 2817, condemning Iran's retaliatory attacks on the Gulf states.
- Iceland: Iceland cosponsored United Nations Security Council Resolution 2817, condemning Iran's retaliatory attacks on the Gulf states.
- Ireland: Taoiseach Micheál Martin said that he was deeply concerned by developments in Iran and urged all parties to exercise restraint, in line with the principles of the UN Charter and international law. He declared that the protection of civilian life in Iran, in Israel and in all neighbouring countries must be paramount to ceasefire efforts. Ireland later cosponsored United Nations Security Council Resolution 2817, condemning Iran's retaliatory attacks on the Gulf states.
- Italy: Foreign minister Antonio Tajani noted that Italy had "given Iran clear signals, but it did not back down". American bases in Italy were put on high alert and a meeting on the topic was pursued. The Ministry of Defence criticized U.S.-Israeli attacks on Iran as violations of international law and said that Italy will provide military aid only to neutral countries and Italians affected by the crossfire, Italy further aided Spain in voicing opposition to the use of European military bases by the US in offensive operations. Italy reported that around 58,000 Italians were stuck in the Middle East following the start of the hostilities. PM Meloni said Italy will send air-defence aid to Gulf countries. Meloni also condemned the Minab school attack, labelling it a "massacre." Italy later cosponsored United Nations Security Council Resolution 2817, condemning Iran's retaliatory attacks on the Gulf states.
- Kosovo: The Ministry of Foreign Affairs released a statement supporting the strikes on Iran.
- Latvia: Foreign Minister Baiba Braže reacted to the death of Ali Khamenei by saying the world would not mourn him, calling it a relief for the Iranian people and expressing hope for a future free of oppression. President Edgars Rinkēvičs described the U.S.-Israel military operation against Iran as an "understandable" response to decades of Iranian actions. While expressing a preference for diplomacy, Rinkēvičs stipulated that diplomatic engagement is only viable if Iran abandons its military nuclear program. Latvia later cosponsored United Nations Security Council Resolution 2817, condemning Iran's retaliatory attacks on the Gulf states.
- Liechtenstein: The government issued a statement calling for deescalation, regional stability, and the protection of civilians, while condemning the Iranian strikes on its neighbours. Liechtenstein later cosponsored United Nations Security Council Resolution 2817, condemning Iran's retaliatory attacks on the Gulf states.
- Lithuania: Foreign Minister Kęstutis Budrys issued a statement regarding the death of Ali Khamenei, stating that the "hope for [a] better future, for [the] Iranian people — but also for Israelis and all of the Middle East — seems to have come closer." Lithuania later cosponsored United Nations Security Council Resolution 2817, condemning Iran's retaliatory attacks on the Gulf states.
- Luxembourg: Prime Minister Luc Frieden said that he "supports the Iranian people", stressing that they must now be allowed to "decide their future, free from violence and oppression." Luxembourg later cosponsored United Nations Security Council Resolution 2817, condemning Iran's retaliatory attacks on the Gulf states.
- Malta: Deputy Prime Minister Ian Borg condemned Iran's retaliatory attacks, conveying support for Qatar and the UAE. Malta later cosponsored United Nations Security Council Resolution 2817, condemning Iran's retaliatory attacks on the Gulf states.
- Moldova: Moldova cosponsored United Nations Security Council Resolution 2817, condemning Iran's retaliatory attacks on the Gulf states.
- Monaco: Monaco cosponsored United Nations Security Council Resolution 2817, condemning Iran's retaliatory attacks on the Gulf states.
- Montenegro: Montenegro cosponsored United Nations Security Council Resolution 2817, condemning Iran's retaliatory attacks on the Gulf states.
- Netherlands: Prime Minister Rob Jetten has maintained a critical stance toward Tehran, calling for a cessation of its military activities and highlighting the Dutch government's "deep concerns" regarding the Iran's internal repression and its role in regional escalation. The Netherlands later cosponsored United Nations Security Council Resolution 2817, condemning Iran's retaliatory attacks on the Gulf states.
- North Cyprus: Foreign Minister Tahsin Ertuğruloğlu declared that "There is no need for Turkish Cypriot people to panic" because the TRNC has no "military targets of any country" unlike the Southern part.
- Norway: Foreign Minister Espen Barth Eide said: "The attack is described by Israel as a preventive strike, but it is not in line with international law. Preventive attacks require an immediately imminent threat." Norway later cosponsored United Nations Security Council Resolution 2817, condemning Iran's retaliatory attacks on the Gulf states.
- North Macedonia: Foreign Minister Timčo Mucunski said that North Macedonia "stands by American allies in the face of destabilizing forces in the Middle East." North Macedonia later cosponsored United Nations Security Council Resolution 2817, condemning Iran's retaliatory attacks on the Gulf states.
- Poland: President Karol Nawrocki stated that Poland had been aware of the military actions in advance through established communication channels with allied nations. On 3 March 2026, Defense Minister Władysław Kosiniak-Kamysz stated that Poland was not participating in U.S. military operations against Iran, noting that no such request had been made. He warned that a prolonged Middle East conflict could jeopardize arms supplies to Ukraine and provide an economic boost to Russia via increased energy prices. In a March 2026 interview with Rzeczpospolita, Polish Foreign Minister Radosław Sikorski stated that he had not witnessed a "direct threat" to Europe, the United States, or Israel from Iran prior to U.S.-Israeli strikes. Poland later cosponsored United Nations Security Council Resolution 2817, condemning Iran's retaliatory attacks on the Gulf states.
- Portugal: Prime Minister Luís Montenegro called for maximum restraint in order to avoid escalation, but condemned Iran for unjustifiably attacking neighbouring countries, insisting on the cessation of the country's nuclear programme and urging Iran to respect the human rights of its people. He defended his government's decision to allow the United States to use Lajes Air Base in the Azores for logistical support during military operations against Iran. Portugal later cosponsored United Nations Security Council Resolution 2817, condemning Iran's retaliatory attacks on the Gulf states.
- Romania: Foreign Minister Oana Țoiu condemned the Iran's internal crackdown and its military aid to Russia, stating that the announcement of Ayatollah Ali Khamenei's death marked a significant turning point. On 3 March 2026, the foreign ministers of Romania and Poland called on all parties involved in the escalating Middle East tensions to exercise maximum restraint, respect international law, and protect civilians. Romania later cosponsored United Nations Security Council Resolution 2817, condemning Iran's retaliatory attacks on the Gulf states.
- Russia: Foreign Minister Sergey Lavrov condemned the attacks by the United States and Israel as a "reckless step" and a "deliberate, premeditated, and unprovoked act of armed aggression", accusing them of pushing the region into a "humanitarian, economic, and potentially even radiological disaster". In a 6 March statement, Vladimir Putin expressed condolences over the death of Iran's Supreme Leader Ali Khamenei and declared the Russian support for Iran through the "need for an immediate cessation of hostilities, the abandonment of forceful solutions to problems around Iran and throughout the Middle East, and a swift return to the path of political and diplomatic resolution", as also reafirmed Russian neutrality by being in contact with leaders of the Gulf states to aid them.
- San Marino: San Marino cosponsored United Nations Security Council Resolution 2817, condemning Iran's retaliatory attacks on the Gulf states.
- Serbia: Serbia cosponsored United Nations Security Council Resolution 2817, condemning Iran's retaliatory attacks on the Gulf states.
- Slovakia: Prime Minister Robert Fico expressed solidarity with countries affected by the attack on Iran—specifically the United Arab Emirates—noting that retaliatory actions were expected. Slovakia later cosponsored United Nations Security Council Resolution 2817, condemning Iran's retaliatory attacks on the Gulf states.
- Slovenia: The government stated that it is following the events with concern and urged for deescalation, warning that the war could have serious consequences for regional and international security. Slovenia later cosponsored United Nations Security Council Resolution 2817, condemning Iran's retaliatory attacks on the Gulf states.

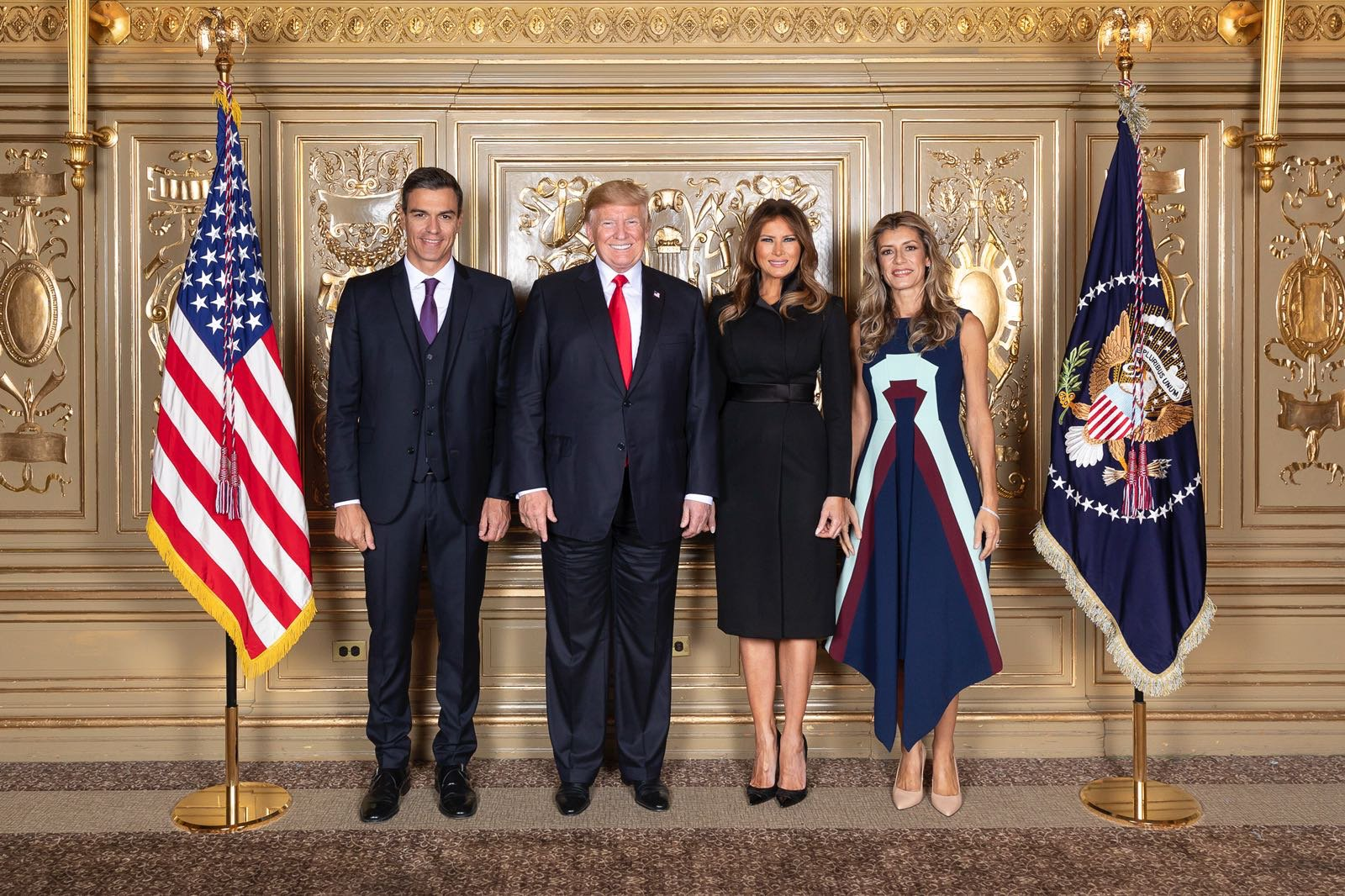
Prime Minister of Spain Pedro Sánchez (standing all the way to the left) condemned the actions of Israel and the US.

- Spain: Prime Minister Pedro Sánchez stated his government's "rejection" of "the unilateral military action of the United States and Israel, which represents an escalation and contributes to a more uncertain and hostile international order" as well as of "the actions of the Iranian regime and the Revolutionary Guard", demanding "immediate de-escalation" and negotiations aimed at a "lasting political solution". Such declarations provoked inner struggles with the pro-US/Israel far-right politicians from PP and Vox (who accused him of subordinating Spanish foreign policy to his own interests and of the PSOE instead of the free world in a war against tyranny). Similarly, the far-left criticised the hypocrisy of the "No War" anti-imperialist speeches when there's still Spanish participation in the 2026 Iran war through the regional mobilizations in British Cyprus bases and NATO missions in the Middle East that makes Spain "accomplice" of the American imperialism and Israeli irredentism. The Spanish government denied the US the use of joint military bases at Rota and Morón to carry out attacks on Iran. Foreign Minister José Manuel Albares stated that "The bases are not being used – nor will they be used – for anything that is not in the agreement [with the US], nor for anything that isn't covered by the UN charter." Fifteen US aircraft were reportedly seen leaving the bases shortly afterward. In response, Trump threatened to halt all trade with Spain and even impose an embargo. However Sánchez maintained its posture despite the risks of leaving Spain in a diplomatic isolation on Europe, declaring that the US-Israel war on Iran is a "big error" which only developed a conflict that is foreign to Europe and is dragging the Eastern Mediterranean region to instability. On 7 March, Spain also condemned the Israeli invasion of Lebanon during the 2026 Lebanon war. On 11 March, Spain withdrew its ambassador to Israel permanently. Spain later cosponsored United Nations Security Council Resolution 2817, condemning Iran's retaliatory attacks on the Gulf states.
- Sweden: Prime Minister Ulf Kristersson denounced Iranian counterattacks and criticized the Iran's "oppression" of its own citizens. He further identified Iran's nuclear program and its support for militant groups as long-term "destabilizing factors" in the Middle East and Europe. Sweden later cosponsored United Nations Security Council Resolution 2817, condemning Iran's retaliatory attacks on the Gulf states.
- Ukraine: President Volodymyr Zelenskyy supported the Israeli–US strikes, stating that "it is important that the United States is acting decisively. Whenever there is American resolve, global criminals weaken. This understanding must also come to the Russians", adding that "in the end, the Middle East region will become safer and more stable." The foreign ministry said that "the cause of the current events is precisely the violence and impunity of the Iranian regime, in particular the killings and repression of peaceful protesters, which have become particularly widespread in recent ‌months." Zelenskyy also alleges that Russia is supplying Iran with Shahed drones for use against the US and Israel. Ukraine later cosponsored United Nations Security Council Resolution 2817, condemning Iran's retaliatory attacks on the Gulf states.
- United Kingdom: The Government urged de-escalation to avoid "wider regional conflict" and stated that it had bolstered "defensive capabilities" and that consular support was being offered to British citizens in the region. Prime Minister Keir Starmer confirmed that British planes are "in the sky" but "played no role" in the Israeli–US strikes, calling on Iran to refrain from further strikes and stop the "appalling violence and repression against the Iranian people". Starmer added that Iran had backed more than 20 "potentially lethal attacks" in the UK over the last year, and that "it is clear they must never be allowed to develop a nuclear weapon." The UK initially did not permit the US to use British military bases for the attack, including RAF Fairford and the military bases on Diego Garcia. However, Starmer later agreed to let the US use British military bases for defensive purposes. He claimed this decision complies with international law. The government also stated that it had bolstered "defensive capabilities" in the region and that consular support was being offered to British citizens in the region. Foreign Secretary Yvette Cooper accused Iran of trying to drag Lebanon into the war. Home Secretary Shabana Mahmood approved the request from the Metropolitan Police to ban the annual Iran-linked Quds Day march from taking place in London. The United Kingdom later cosponsored United Nations Security Council Resolution 2817, condemning Iran's retaliatory attacks on the Gulf states.

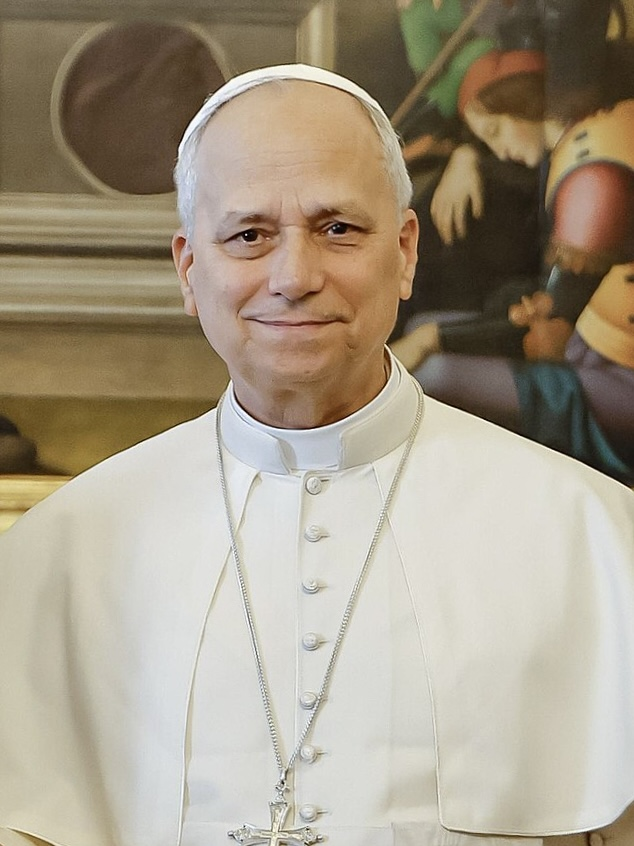
Pope Leo XIV, the head of the Catholic Church and Vatican City warned: "I address to the parties involved a heartfelt appeal to assume the moral responsibility to stop the spiral of violence before it becomes an irreparable abyss!"

- Vatican City: Pope Leo XIV called on the involved nations to stop what he called the "spiral of violence" and warned that the war could lead to a "tragedy of enormous proportions." He also warned: "I address to the parties involved a heartfelt appeal to assume the moral responsibility to stop the spiral of violence before it becomes an irreparable abyss!" Cardinal Blase Cupich referred to a video released by the White House of attacks on Iran mixed with Hollywood film clips as "horrifying" and "sickening". Pope Leo later rebuked those who wage war and have "hands full of blood," stating that God "does not listen to the prayers of those who wage war, but rejects them." This was an apparent rebuke of Pete Hegseth, who prayed for violence against enemies who deserved "no mercy." Trump responded by calling on the pope to call out Iran for the massacre of "42,000 unarmed protesters."

==== North America ====
- Antigua and Barbuda: Prime Minister Gaston Browne expressed concern at the escalation of the conflict and condemned Iran's strikes on its neighbours. Antigua and Barbuda later cosponsored United Nations Security Council Resolution 2817, condemning Iran's retaliatory attacks on the Gulf states.
- Bahamas: Prime Minister Philip Davis stated that the government is closely monitoring the situation, warning Bahamians that the war could harshly impact the cost of living due to the country being dependent on international trade, now impacted by the conflict. The Minister of Economic Affairs Michael Halkitis said that the Bahamas hope for a return to normalcy, advising Bahamians in the region to seek shelter. The Bahamas later cosponsored United Nations Security Council Resolution 2817, condemning Iran's retaliatory attacks on the Gulf states.
- Barbados: The government urged Iran to uphold respect for international law and halt attacks on its neighbours, while subscribing to UN chief Gutérres's demand on all parties to exercise restraint and avoid further escalation. Barbados later cosponsored United Nations Security Council Resolution 2817, condemning Iran's retaliatory attacks on the Gulf states.
- Canada: Prime Minister Mark Carney expressed support for U.S. and Israeli air strikes on Iran, describing the country as "the principal source of instability and terror throughout the Middle East" and a threat to international security. Carney later said that he supported the strikes "with regret, because the current conflict is another example of the failure of the international order". Carney also said the US-Israeli attack on Iran appeared to be "inconsistent with international law." On 2 April, Canadian MP Costas Menegakis said that any deal that would leave the current government in Iran intact is extremely dangerous. On 16 April, Canada called for all sides to continue talks, while condemning Iran's repression of protesters and dissidents. Canada later cosponsored United Nations Security Council Resolution 2817, condemning Iran's retaliatory attacks on the Gulf states.
- Costa Rica: Foreign Minister Arnoldo André Tinoco said that Costa Rica expects a "big conflict" following the American and Israeli attacks, adding that the war can disrupt global trade and travel. André also expressed Costa Rica's "energetic condemnation" of the Iranian attacks against its neighbours. Costa Rica later cosponsored United Nations Security Council Resolution 2817, condemning Iran's retaliatory attacks on the Gulf states.
- Cuba: President Miguel Díaz-Canel condemned the US and Israeli strikes.
- Dominica: The government issued a statement expressing "deep concern" at the events in Iran, urging for restraint and the protection of civilians. The government also commended the governments of Saudi Arabia, the UAE, Bahrain, Qatar, and Kuwait, for demonstrating "leadership, restraint, and maturity." Dominica later cosponsored United Nations Security Council Resolution 2817, condemning Iran's retaliatory attacks on the Gulf states.
- Dominican Republic: The government said it "strongly condemns" the Iranian strikes on its neighbours and called on all parties involved to show restraint and seek a peaceful solution. The Dominican Republic later cosponsored United Nations Security Council Resolution 2817, condemning Iran's retaliatory attacks on the Gulf states.
- Grenada: Grenada cosponsored United Nations Security Council Resolution 2817, condemning Iran's retaliatory attacks on the Gulf states.
- Guatemala: The government issued a statement reaffirming its commitment to the UN charter, highlighting international law, state sovereignty, territorial integrity, and peaceful solutions to conflicts. Guatemala later cosponsored United Nations Security Council Resolution 2817, condemning Iran's retaliatory attacks on the Gulf states.
- Haiti: Haiti cosponsored United Nations Security Council Resolution 2817, condemning Iran's retaliatory attacks on the Gulf states.
- Honduras: President Nasry Asfura avoided mentioning any country, but issued a statement on the conflict saying that Honduras supports "countries that defend their security", expressing solidarity with those who defend regional peace in the Middle East. Honduras later cosponsored United Nations Security Council Resolution 2817, condemning Iran's retaliatory attacks on the Gulf states.
- Jamaica: Jamaica cosponsored United Nations Security Council Resolution 2817, condemning Iran's retaliatory attacks on the Gulf states.
- Mexico: President Claudia Sheinbaum condemned the use of military force to impose changes, further criticising the United Nations, which she said had "stopped doing its job." Sheinbaum also expressed support for Spanish Prime Minister Pedro Sánchez over Spain's rift with the US, saying that "[Sánchez's] position to bet for peace is very respectable."
- Nicaragua: Co-president Rosario Murillo condemned the attacks on Iran and sent condolences over the "martyrdom of the Iranian people, of Ayatollah Khamenei, and his family."
- Panama: Panama cosponsored United Nations Security Council Resolution 2817, condemning Iran's retaliatory attacks on the Gulf states.
- Saint Kitts and Nevis: Saint Kitts and Nevis cosponsored United Nations Security Council Resolution 2817, condemning Iran's retaliatory attacks on the Gulf states.
- Saint Lucia: Saint Lucia cosponsored United Nations Security Council Resolution 2817, condemning Iran's retaliatory attacks on the Gulf states.
- Saint Vincent and the Grenadines: Prime Minister Godwin Friday expressed concern at the impact of the war in the Caribbean region, and told citizens to "brace" for the economic consequences, saying that "the bombs may not fall here, but they have serious implications for us and for other countries around the region." Saint Vincent and the Grenadines later cosponsored United Nations Security Council Resolution 2817, condemning Iran's retaliatory attacks on the Gulf states.
- Trinidad and Tobago: Prime Minister Kamla Persad-Bissessar said that Trinidad and Tobago "supports the actions of the United States and Israel and its allies aimed at preventing oppressive regimes from acquiring nuclear weapons capabilities that would jeopardise international peace and security". She called Iran's nuclear program a "global threat" and expressed solidarity with the countries attacked by Iran. Trinidad and Tobago later cosponsored United Nations Security Council Resolution 2817, condemning Iran's retaliatory attacks on the Gulf states.

==== Oceania ====
- Australia: Prime Minister Anthony Albanese, in a joint statement with Foreign Minister Penny Wong and Defence Minister Richard Marles, expressed support for US and Israeli strikes, also stating Australia stood with "the brave people of Iran in their struggle against oppression". Australia later granted seven members of the Iranian women's national football team, who had been competing in Australia, humanitarian visas to allow them to stay in the country following fears of their safety in returning to Iran after they refused to sing the Iranian national anthem before their first fixture. In the days that followed, five of them withdrew their asylum applications and indicated a wish to return to Iran; three of those who had initially chosen to remain returned on 14 March, and a fifth player withdrew her asylum request on 15 March. Australia later cosponsored United Nations Security Council Resolution 2817, condemning Iran's retaliatory attacks on the Gulf states.
- Cook Islands: Prime Minister Mark Brown ordered senior officials to take measures to secure fuel supply and other essential goods and services for the islanders, while assuring that the country could be affected economically by the war due to being in the final link of the global supply chain.
- Federated States of Micronesia: The Federated States of Micronesia cosponsored United Nations Security Council Resolution 2817, condemning Iran's retaliatory attacks on the Gulf states.
- Fiji: Foreign Minister Sakiasi Ditoka called for restraint and urged for a peaceful solution in accordance with international law. The commander of the Republic of Fiji Military Forces said that Fijian soldiers in the region were safe and told their families to remain calm, assuring that the military operations were far from the Fijian facilities. Fiji later cosponsored United Nations Security Council Resolution 2817, condemning Iran's retaliatory attacks on the Gulf states.
- Kiribati: Kiribati cosponsored United Nations Security Council Resolution 2817, condemning Iran's retaliatory attacks on the Gulf states.
- Marshall Islands: President Hilda Heine declared a 90-day state of emergency on 30 March in response to a fuel crisis exacerbated by the Iranian blockade of the Strait of Hormuz. The Marshall Islands later cosponsored United Nations Security Council Resolution 2817, condemning Iran's retaliatory attacks on the Gulf states.
- New Zealand: Prime Minister Christopher Luxon and Foreign Affairs Minister Winston Peters in a joint statement said "New Zealand has consistently condemned Iran's Nuclear programme, its destablilising activities in the region and elsewhere, and its repression of its own people", acknowledging the US/Israeli strikes were "designed to prevent Iran from continuing to threaten international peace and security" and calling for a resumption of negotiations and adherence to international law. New Zealand later cosponsored United Nations Security Council Resolution 2817, condemning Iran's retaliatory attacks on the Gulf states.
- Palau: President Surangel Whipps Jr. warned of serious economic consequences for the country as a result of the Iranian blockade of the Strait of Hormuz. Whipps added that fuel and diesel prices increased by 50% and also basic goods with a deep impact in daily lives of Palauans. Palau later cosponsored United Nations Security Council Resolution 2817, condemning Iran's retaliatory attacks on the Gulf states.
- Papua New Guinea: Foreign Minister Justin Tkatchenko expressed support for the US and Israel, accusing Iran of harbouring terrorism. Prime Minister James Marape conveyed sympathies for Israel and the UAE, asking for a total restoration of peace in the Middle East and beyond. Following the open support by PNG to the US and Israel, Jerry Singirok, a former commander of the Papua New Guinea Defence Force, urged PM Marape to take a neutral stance due to risks that aligning with the US and Israel would mean for security of PNG, especially of service members at the recently upgraded Lombrum Naval Base on Manus Island. Papua New Guinea later cosponsored United Nations Security Council Resolution 2817, condemning Iran's retaliatory attacks on the Gulf states.
- Tonga: Tonga cosponsored United Nations Security Council Resolution 2817, condemning Iran's retaliatory attacks on the Gulf states.
- Tuvalu: Tuvalu cosponsored United Nations Security Council Resolution 2817, condemning Iran's retaliatory attacks on the Gulf states.
- Vanuatu: A government spokesman said that Vanuatu maintains a non-aligned position about conflicts between "big countries", adding that Vanuatu supports peace, while warning citizens about the possible negative effects on local economy as a result of the war, including rising inflation. Vanuatu later cosponsored United Nations Security Council Resolution 2817, condemning Iran's retaliatory attacks on the Gulf states.

==== South America ====
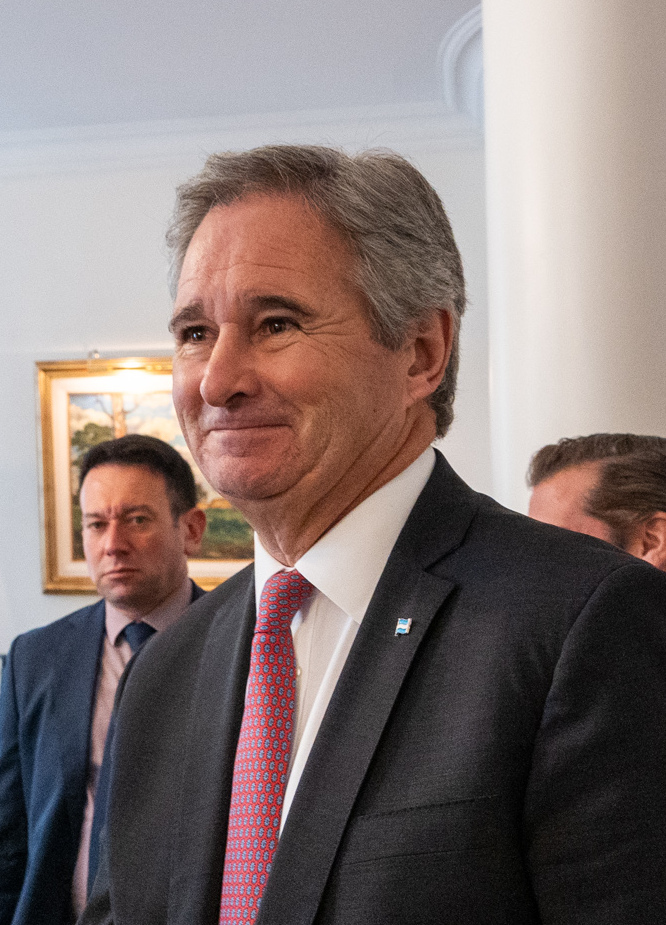
Pablo Quirno, the foreign minister of Argentina, stated his support for the US and Israel.

- Argentina: President Javier Milei said during a visit to New York City on 9 March that he is "proud to be the most Zionist president in the world", adding that because "Iran bombed us (Argentina) twice [...] Iran is our enemy and we will win this war." Foreign Minister Pablo Quirno expressed support for the US and Israel, saying that their military operations seek a "lasting stability in the world and security in the region". On 2 April, Argentina expelled Iran's top diplomat, ordering him to leave their territory within 48 hours. Argentina later cosponsored United Nations Security Council Resolution 2817, condemning Iran's retaliatory attacks on the Gulf states. See: Argentina in the 2026 Iran war
- Bolivia: The government issued a statement reaffirming Bolivia's commitment to peace and urging the international community to uphold the observance of human rights. The statement also advised Bolivians in the region to seek consular assistance. Bolivia later cosponsored United Nations Security Council Resolution 2817, condemning Iran's retaliatory attacks on the Gulf states.
- Brazil: Brazil condemned the attacks on Iran. The Ministry of Foreign Affairs condemned and expressed "grave concern" for the attacks, urging all parties involved to "respect International Law and to exercise maximum restraint to prevent an escalation of hostilities and to ensure the protection of civilians and civilian infrastructure".
- Chile: The outgoing government, headed by Gabriel Boric, condemned "the attacks against Iran perpetrated by the United States in conjunction with Israel, as well as the Iranian regime's response against Israel and Gulf states", expressed its concern about the military escalation in the region and called for an end to the violence, reaffirming its commitment to nuclear non-proliferation. Incoming president José Antonio Kast released a statement saying that Chile must align with democratic nations, expressing concern at civilian casualties in the strikes and the risks of the Iranian nuclear programme. Kast's office also condemned Iran's actions against its neighbours. Chile later cosponsored United Nations Security Council Resolution 2817, condemning Iran's retaliatory attacks on the Gulf states.
- Colombia: President Gustavo Petro condemned the US and Israeli strikes on Iran and the assassination of Khamenei, accusing Prime Minister Netanyahu of "killing 108 schoolgirls" in one of the airstrikes. Petro later called for a "global front" against war and said that he will summon a peace conference to assure that the ongoing war will not hinder possibilities of a Palestinian state.
- Ecuador: The Foreign Ministry issued a statement condemning Iranian strikes on its neighbours. Ecuador later cosponsored United Nations Security Council Resolution 2817, condemning Iran's retaliatory attacks on the Gulf states.
- Guyana: The Foreign Ministry called for de-escalation and expressed solidarity with the Arab countries attacked by Iran, condemning Iranian strikes on them. Guyana later cosponsored United Nations Security Council Resolution 2817, condemning Iran's retaliatory attacks on the Gulf states.
- Paraguay: Foreign Minister Rubén Ramírez Lezcano expressed support for Israel during a phone call with Israeli FM Gideon Sa'ar, while President Santiago Peña condemned Iran's strikes on Arab neighbours. Peña later expressed support for the US and Israel and warned of the "failed world governance" imposed after World War II. Paraguay later cosponsored United Nations Security Council Resolution 2817, condemning Iran's retaliatory attacks on the Gulf states.
- Peru: The government issued a statement condemning the Iranian strikes on its neighbours and called for peace in the region. Peru later cosponsored United Nations Security Council Resolution 2817, condemning Iran's retaliatory attacks on the Gulf states.
- Suriname: Suriname cosponsored United Nations Security Council Resolution 2817, condemning Iran's retaliatory attacks on the Gulf states.
- Uruguay: The Ministry of Foreign Relations issued a statement expressing the Government's "grave concern" over the escalation of violence resulting from military operations conducted by the United States and Israel, as well as Iran's military response targeting neighbouring countries. The statement further noted that Uruguay, as a "country committed to the promotion of peace", urges the parties involved to resume diplomatic channels in order to address issues related to "the nuclear question".
- Venezuela: The Foreign Ministry condemned the strikes on Iran, calling them a "dangerous and unprecedented" escalation amid diplomatic talks to reach a nuclear deal. The message was later removed from social media after the confirmation of the death of Khamenei. Venezuela also condemned Iran's attacks on its neighbours as "undue and condemnable" and blamed a lack of dialogue in the region as a cause for the events.

=== Non-state actors ===
- Ahwaz Falcons: The Ahwaz Falcons stated that "a new beginning for fieldwork in the occupied Arab land of Ahwaz", and threatened Iran, warning it "not to continue its crimes against our people and our occupied land of Ahwaz, and we also warn it not to continue its blatant interference in our Arab countries such as Iraq, Syria, Yemen, Bahrain, and Saudi Arabia".
- Ahwaz Freedom Brigades: The Ahwaz Freedom Brigades announced a rebellion and called on all of Ahwaz to join the rebellion.
- Coordinating Council of Ahwazi Organizations: The Ahwaz Arab separatist organization accused Iran of forcibly annexing "non-Persian peoples" into the nation and voiced support for Ahwazi national unity and self-determination. They also announced potential plans for future attacks amid the war.
- (Kurdistan Region) Coalition of Political Forces of Iranian Kurdistan: Kurdistan Freedom Party spokesman Hana Yazdanpana informed Middle East Eye that the militant group supported the American and Israeli attacks on Iran. Representatives from the coalition stated that they were jointly coordinating political and military decisions and preparing for a new phase, claiming that their forces were "deep inside Iran" and along the Iran–Iraq border, ready to respond as the situation develops.
- Balochistan People's Party: The Iranian-Balochi federalist political party accused Iran of repression and adventurism, warning of greater oppression of ethnic minorities by the Iranian government if Israel and the United States both fail to topple it.
- Cyber Jihad Movement: Amid the 2026 Iran war, the Al-Qaeda-affiliated hacking group released a statement in support of pro-Iran hacking groups against Israel and the United States.
- Free Balochistan Movement: The Baloch separatist group, which split from the militant organization Baloch Liberation Army, welcomed the American-Israeli strikes on Iran and called for the safeguards of human rights and democracy.
- Hamas: Hamas in the Gaza Strip condemned the "Zionist-American hostilities on the Islamic Republic" and affirmed its solidarity with Iran, further calling for Muslim unity in the face of US-Israeli attempts "to establish 'Greater Israel' at the expense of Arab and Muslim lands." Hamas later urged Iran to stop "avoid targeting neighboring countries" and expressed its "deep concern."
- Harakat Hezbollah al-Nujaba: HNN Secretary-General Akram al-Kaabi condemned the Israeli–American attacks on Iran and vowed to join the war, stating "our mujahideen and heroes are not those who speak in gatherings saying, 'if only we had been with you' and then they cower on the battlefield."
- Hezbollah: Hezbollah in Lebanon condemned the US-Israeli strikes, stating "we are confident that the American and Israeli enemy will receive a great slap and will reap nothing but failure from its tyrannical, criminal aggression." After the assassination of Ali Khamenei was confirmed, Hezbollah Secretary-General Naim Qassem vowed to retaliate and "undertake our duty of confronting the aggression", stating that Hezbollah would not leave "the field of honour and resistance". Hezbollah joined the war on 2 March launching strikes on Israel. Israeli defense minister Israel Katz stated that Qassem is "marked for elimination". Hezbollah also condemned US, Israel attack on Iran as a “blatant violation of international law and the United Nations Charter”
- Houthi movement: The Houthi movement in Yemen threatened to escalate their conflict in the Red Sea. They decided to resume missile and drone attacks on US and Israeli-flagged ships in the Red Sea. Houthi leader Abdul-Malik al-Houthi said that his forces are "in a state of high readiness for any necessary developments", adding that Iran's retaliatory strikes are a "legitimate right and is not a targeting of the countries in which the American bases are located".
- Islamic State: In Al-Naba, the Islamic State framed the war against Iran as a “divinely sanctioned” conflict between two sides it regards as disbelievers.
- Kata'ib Hezbollah: KH in Iraq threatened to "soon begin attacking US bases in response to their aggression" after a strike in Jurf al-Nasr area of Iraq's Babylon Governorate killed two people and injured three others. KH also threatened a prolonged war with the United States, saying that "we must drag [the United States] into a long war of attrition […] in which we leave no American presence in the region generally, especially in Iraq."
- Kata'ib Sayyid al-Shuhada: KSS leader Abu Ala al-Walai justified the Iranian retaliatory strikes on neighboring Arab states, claiming that they only targeted American sites and personnel. He also claimed that U.S. personnel had "fled their bases scattered throughout the Gulf countries and sought refuge in hotels and civilian buildings" to prompt Iran to strike cities and civilian infrastructure in the Gulf.
- Kurdistan Region: Nechirvan Barzani, President of the autonomous Kurdistan Region in Iraq expressed condolences for the martyrdom of the late Ayatollah Ali Khamenei, the Supreme Leader of the Islamic Republic of Iran, stating that "we sympathize and share in their grief, we pray to Almighty God to bless his soul with His mercy and kindness and to grant patience and comfort to everyone." Following the targeting of Erbil International Airport and the Consulate General of the United States in Erbil by Iranian missiles, a senior commander of the Peshmerga stated that his forces were on alert and "prepared for any eventuality".
- Libyan National Army: Khalifa Haftar, LNA Supreme Commander and leader of the Government of National Stability, expressed his "strong condemnation of the blatant Iranian attacks targeting the UAE" stressing that "these attacks represent a serious violation and a direct threat to the stability of the region" and expressed full solidarity with the UAE.
- National Guard: Sheikh Hikmat al-Hijri reaffirmed his support for Israel by calling the Iran war a "strategic direction of the allies", arguing that Iran has "destabilized the region" and harmed its own people.
- Palestinian Islamic Jihad: PIJ condemned the strikes, stating that Iran has the right "to defend itself and deter opponents" and that "these hostilities target not only Iran, but all countries and people of our nation, and seek to impose domination by war criminals."
- People's Fighters Front: PFF released a statement calling the Iranian government "oppressive" and "incompetent", holding it responsible for the "devastating war". The Council of Scholars said that the Iranian people played no part in bringing war from Israel or the US and vowed further conflicts against the Iranian government.
- (Sahrawi Arab Democratic Republic) Polisario Front: Polisario Front representative to Spain Abdulah Arabi condemned the Spanish government's lack of "coherence" by condemning the war on Iran but while not supporting Sahrawi independence, stating that while countries must uphold international law, "they must also be consistent in their defense of international law with regard to Western Sahara."
- Popular Mobilization Forces: The PMF condemned U.S. airstrikes targeting its several headquarters and bases across Iraq, condemning them as "sinful air attacks" and a "blatant transgression" and a serious violation of Iraq's sovereignty.

=== Intergovernmental organizations ===
- Arab League: Arab League Secretary-General Ahmed Aboul Gheit condemned the Iranian attacks on several Arab states, calling them "fully reprehensible" and a "grave Iranian strategic mistake," constituting "not only a blatant violation of international law and the UN charter, but also an assault on the principles of good neighborliness." An Arab League emergency meeting has been scheduled for 8 March 2026.
- European Union: European Commission President Ursula von der Leyen and Council President António Costa called the conflict "greatly concerning" and urged restraint. On 1 March 2026, von der Leyen stated that she supported a "credible transition" of power in Iran. The EU officially called for de-escalation and diplomatic initiatives with the help of the Gulf countries, adjacent regions in Africa and the Indo-Pacific that are also affected by the War.
- Gulf Cooperation Council: The GCC convened an emergency council meeting and ordered Iran to cease attacks on Arab countries immediately.
- (United Nations) International Atomic Energy Agency: The IAEA convened an emergency meeting requested by the Russian Federation on 2 March. In March 2026, IAEA Director General Rafael Grossi reported that while Iran maintained a significant stockpile of near-weapons-grade uranium, there was no evidence of a structured program to build a nuclear bomb. The IAEA confirmed on 17 March 2026 that a projectile hit the premises of the Bushehr Nuclear Power Plant in southwestern Iran, stating that no damage to the facility or injuries to staff were reported.
- NATO: NATO is a defense organization of member states that agree to mutual defence in response to an attack on a member state by an outside party, for example, their responses to the 9-11 attack upon the United States, not an agreement to join an aggression conducted by a member state. A NATO spokesperson stated they were closely watching the situation while a senior official told Stars and Stripes that its missile defence vigilance was heightened in order to protect its member states in the event that Iranian attacks expanded. Mark Rutte, NATO secretary general, said in an interview with BBC that Europe is "supportive" of the United States attacks on Iran stating that Iran is a "threat". Trump thanked NATO Secretary General Mark Rutte for his support.
- The Shanghai Cooperation Organization expressed serious concern over the conflict. The statement also stated that member states of the SCO consider the use of force as unacceptable.
- UNHRC: The UNHRC issued a strong condemnation regarding Iran's attack on regional countries, calling it to immediately compensate them for the damages it caused.
- ICRC: Mirjana Spoljaric Egger, president of the International Committee of the Red Cross, called on countries to respect the rules of war and urged them to find the political will to prevent “further death and destruction”. She warned that “a dangerous chain reaction” of military escalation was under way across the Middle East, “with potentially devastating consequences for civilians”.

== Media coverage ==
=== Iran ===
Before hostilities erupted, media attention on US-Iran tensions increased in early 2026, following failed nuclear talks and domestic unrest in Iran. Iranian state media, such as the IRNA, portrayed these developments as provocations.

Lego-style propaganda animation produced by Iranian media company Explosive Media using text-to-video modeling.

Iranian state-controlled outlets have been described as employing propaganda techniques, including the use of AI-generated videos (such as those produced by Explosive Media) and inflated casualty figures. Trump has accused Iran of using artificial intelligence as a "disinformation weapon." Iranian media broadcast manipulated images of alleged victories, prompting fact-checking from organizations like NewsGuard. The Iranian government responded to the Trump administration's use of video game clips, cartoon characters, and blockbuster movie scenes for Iran messaging with an AI-generated propaganda video featuring Lego minifigure-style models, produced by the Revayat-e-Fath Institute and redistributed on various government-run outlets, including redistribution by the Iranian Ministry of Foreign Affairs. The video shows a statement in remembrance of the Minab school attack and showcases Iran attacking various of its neighbours and American-Israeli outposts.

=== Israel ===
Reactions in Israel to the signing of the Islamabad Memorandum between the United States and Iran were largely negative, with many expressing feelings of outrage and betrayal. An Israel Hayom op-ed with the headline "You could have been the greatest president of all, but you failed" accused Trump of signing a surrender agreement and having humiliated his own country.

=== United States ===
Before hostilities erupted, media attention on US-Iran tensions increased in early 2026, following failed nuclear talks and reports of Iranian domestic unrest. Outlets such as CNN and The New York Times detailed US military buildups in the region, speculating about possible attacks. As the airstrikes began, initial reporting relied heavily on satellite imagery and official briefings. The Pentagon's announcements of the destruction of Iranian assets were widely echoed, but independent verification proved difficult due to Tehran's communications restrictions. Slate criticized American news coverage of the war, arguing that headlines too often treat statements from the Trump administration as objective and fail to also cover points of contradiction by Iran.

==== Video game clips ====
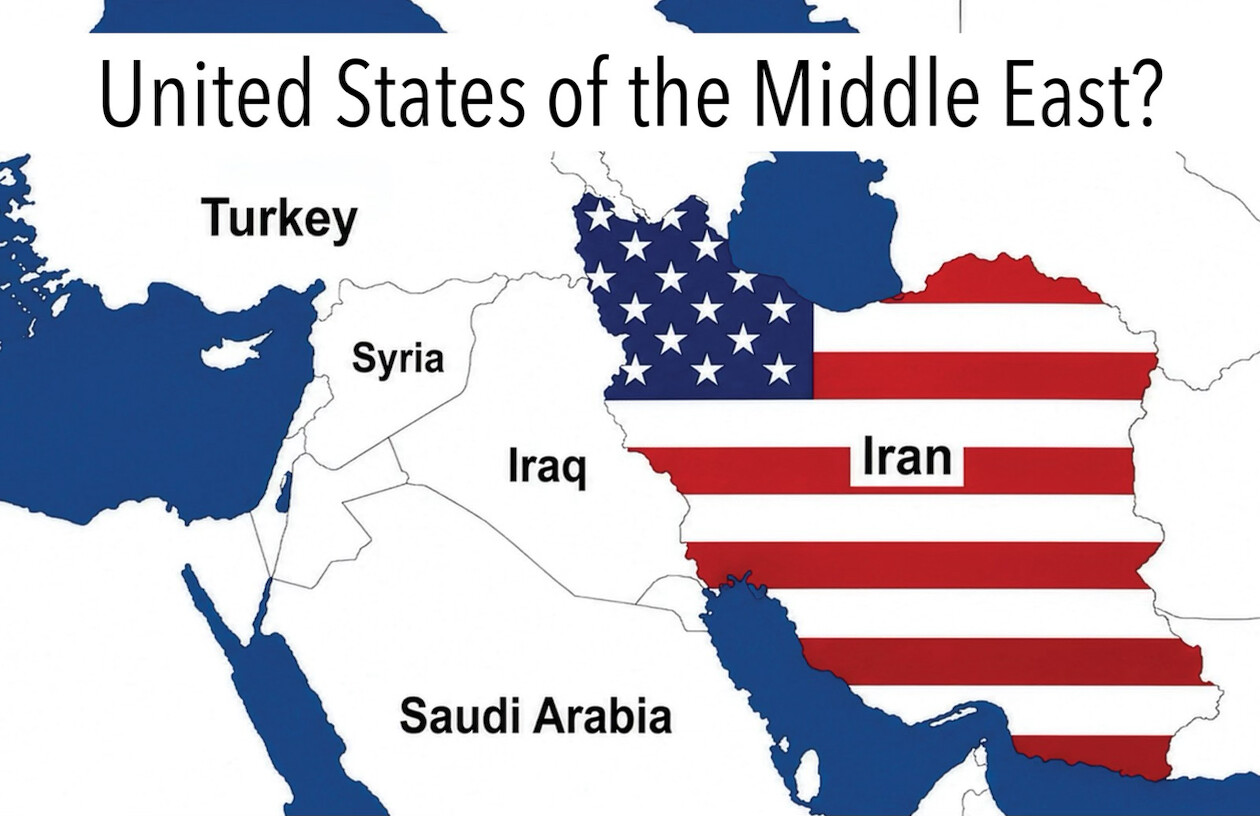
Map posted by Trump on Truth Social of the US flag covering Iran, hinting annexation

The White House faced backlash over a video that mixed real war footage with video game clips. Mondoweiss said such efforts distorted public understanding. PBS argued The Trump administration's use of video game footage, cartoon and blockbuster movie scenes for Iran messaging "risks reducing a real war to spectacle". Trump has repeatedly shared provocative images regarding the Iran war such as a map of the US flag over Iran with words reading "United States of the Middle East?" and an AI-generated image of Iranian ships being bombed.

The White House circulates videos fusing real airstrike footages with visuals from video games and action movies, "transforming acts of destruction into a spectacle of national triumph", keeping the audience detached from the human suffering it produces. Artists and entertainment companies often object to their works use in such clips. Kesha's song "Blow" was used alongside footage of an airstrike and the caption "Lethality", which prompted the singer to post on X, "Stop using my music, perverts @WhiteHouse". Blase Cupich, an American Catholic Cardinal who is close with Pope Leo XIV, referred to a video released by the White House of attacks on Iran mixed with Hollywood film clips as "horrifying" and "sickening".

==== US government reactions ====
On 14 March 2026, Federal Communications Commission chairman Brendan Carr, a Trump appointee, warned broadcasters that those who "perpetrate fake news and distort the news" must "take the right course" or risk losing their licenses at renewal. Carr said broadcasters "must act in the public interest, and if they don't, they will lose their licenses," citing the public's low trust in legacy media and past election coverage problems. Trump expressed that he was "enthusiastic" about Carr's stance. In response to opposition of the war from Pope Leo XIV, Trump falsely claimed that the pope supported Iran having nuclear weapons and shared provocative memes on social media.

Defense Secretary Pete Hegseth also criticized the coverage during a news conference, taking issue with CNN's reporting and suggesting emphasizing Iranian frustration rather than adding to the headlines. Democratic lawmakers condemned the FCC's remarks as unconstitutional censorship, with many calling it "oppressive" and a violation of the First Amendment.

On 3 June 2026, the US House passed an act with a vote of 215-208 requiring the United States' war efforts to cease or gain approval from Congress to continue fighting.

On 23 June 2026, the US Senate enacted an act by a vote of 50-48 mandating the United States to either end its war operations or seek congressional consent to continue fighting.

=== International ===
News media and traders have repeatedly applied the pejorative abbreviation "Trump Always Chickens Out" (TACO), previously used first for the Liberation Day tariffs, for Trump's repeated refusals to enforce his "red line" threats against Iran. Another pejorative abbreviation called "Not A Chance Hormuz Opens" (NACHO) was devised in reference to Trump's inability to quickly reopen the strait. CNN observed that over the course of the war, Trump's repeated talking points, such as his claim that Iran's military had been destroyed and another that Iranian leadership supposedly really wants to make a deal with Trump regarding the war, had been stated baselessly for months. The Atlantic argued that it was Trump who was visibly desperate for a deal and that Iran is able to exploit his needs. Al-Monitor reported that Netanyahu and his inner political circle view Trump's insistence on a deal as disastrous and blame him for failing to achieve regime change and victory against Iran.

New reports have determined suspicious insider trading patterns within the stock and oil markets in correlation with "positive" news of the war from Trump over several months. Wall Street analysts and Iranian state media had accused journalist Barak Ravid of Axios of repeating false information from anonymous sources regarding ongoing negotiations to allow for market manipulation of oil prices. The Wall Street Journal argued that Trump directly intervened in the oil market by "jawboning" it, posting "positive" news of supposed negotiations to kill momentum of oil price increases by traders in quick responses to "negative" news. CNN observed that Trump incorrectly claimed that the US was close to an agreement with Iran to end the war more than 35 times from late March to early June, many of which involved Trump portraying Iran as supposedly "desperate". Because of the volatility of the oil market as a result of Trump's frequent social media posts affecting them, investors had reported fatigue and became increasingly driven away. These trends caused a near 17% decline in brent crude oil open interest by June, the fastest since 2009.

Analysts accused Western media of failing to challenge the official narrative, with Mondoweiss highlighting the flattering language that downplayed civilian casualties. Al Jazeera English noted the overrepresentation of voices from the pro-war Iranian diaspora. Pre-war coverage was also marred by inadequate public warnings.

== See also ==
- Reactions to the assassination of Ali Khamenei
- Reactions to the Twelve-Day War
- Reactions to the 2025–2026 Iranian protests
- International reactions to the 2026 United States intervention in Venezuela
- Economic impact of the 2026 Iran war
- 2026 Internet blackout in Iran
- Religious justifications for the 2026 Iran war
