= China in the 2026 Iran war =

The involvement of the People's Republic of China in the 2026 Iran war has encompassed a range of financial, diplomatic, intelligence, and logistical actions amid the conflict that began with coordinated airstrikes by Israel and the United States against Iran on 28 February 2026. China has maintained a longstanding partnership with Iran, including economic ties and military cooperation. Since the beginning of the conflict, China has focused on diplomatic mediation while Chinese companies have provided dual-use technology, such as missile parts, and geospatial intelligence to Iran. The U.S. has levied sanctions against Chinese companies for processing Iranian crude and allegedly providing satellite data to Iran to target U.S. and allied forces in the region.

Despite public condemnations of the U.S.-Israeli strikes, China has not committed troops or engaged in combat operations. It abstained from condemning Iranian attacks on Gulf states in United Nations Security Council Resolution 2817. China's priorities centered on securing energy supplies through the Strait of Hormuz and avoiding disruptions to global trade.

== Background ==
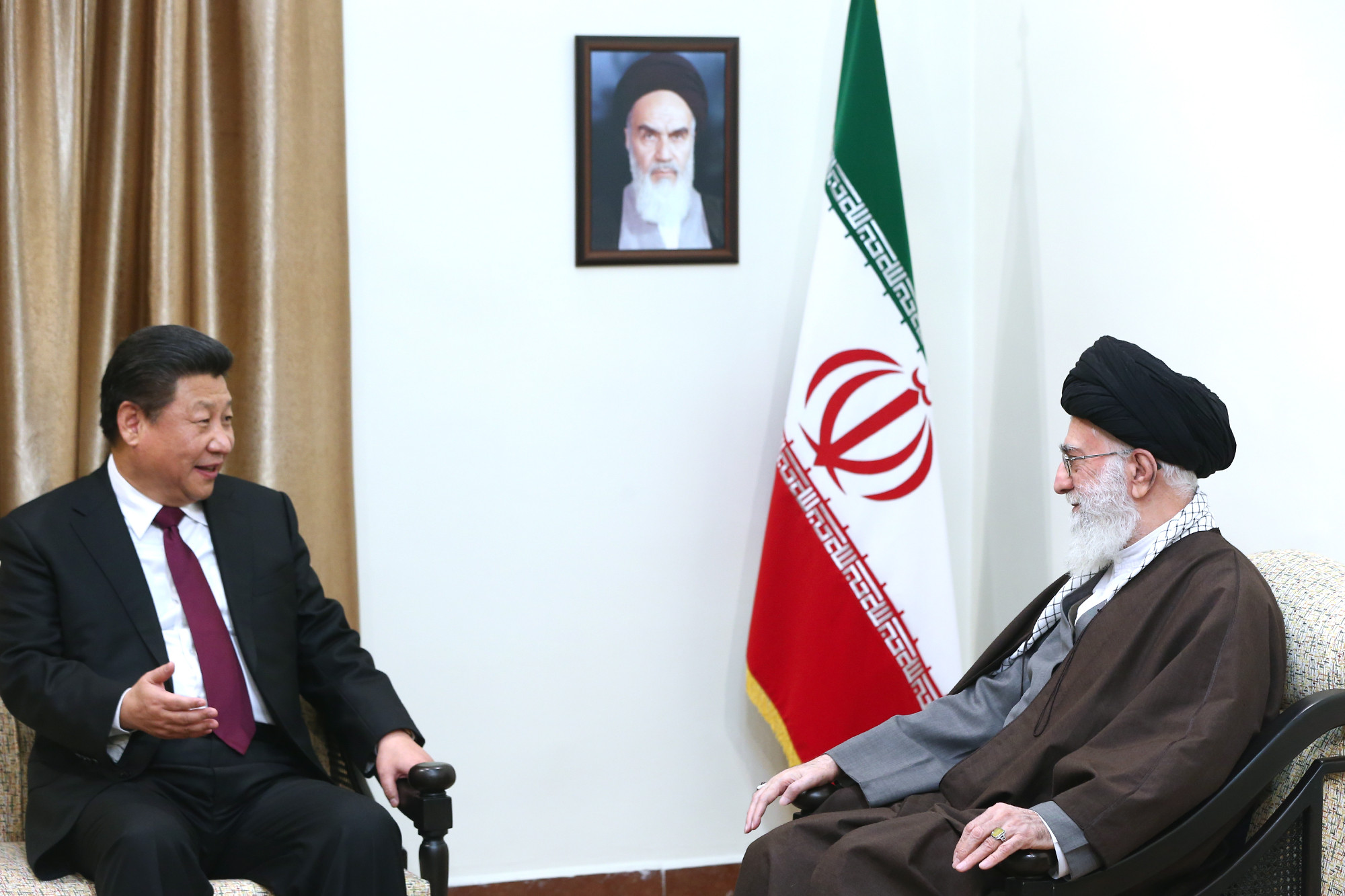
CCP General Secretary Xi Jinping met with Iranian Supreme Leader Ali Khamenei in 2016.

China had developed extensive ties with Iran before the war, as its largest trading partner, importing more than 80 percent of Iran's shipped oil and providing technological support, including radar systems and navigation tools.

China has been playing a mediation role in several regional conflicts including Iran–Saudi Arabia proxy war, Afghan conflict and the 2026 Afghanistan–Pakistan War.

== Chinese involvement ==
Intelligence assessments indicated Beijing prepared to offer financial aid and missile components, though it refrained from overt military involvement to safeguard its oil imports through contested waterways. Chinese dual-use technologies, such as radar systems and navigation technology, exported pre-war, enhanced Iran's electronic warfare capabilities. China has also assisted Iran in dodging international sanctions to facilitate oil sales using a special purpose vehicle.

Beijing dispatched envoys for mediation and warned of spreading "flames of war," while evacuating its nationals from Iran. Its abstention from UN votes against Iran aligned with Russia, but experts highlighted China's long-term strategy to position itself as a post-conflict stabilizer in the region.

=== Allegations of military and intelligence assistance to Iran ===
In March 2026, the U.S. accused Chinese state-owned company Semiconductor Manufacturing International Corporation of providing chipmaking tools to Iran's military. The same month, the United States–China Economic and Security Review Commission stated that China's BeiDou satellite navigation system had been used by Iran to direct attacks across the region. Chinese firms with links to the People's Liberation Army, such as MizarVision and Jing'an Technology, have marketed geospatial intelligence about the positions and movements US forces in the region. Multiple sanctioned Iranian ships believed to be carrying sodium perchlorate, a precursor material for solid-propellant rockets, have traveled from China to Iran since the war began. On 11 April 2026, several days after the initiation of a two-week ceasefire, CNN reported that, according to U.S. intelligence sources, China was preparing to ship man-portable air-defense systems (MANPADs) to Iran through third countries, which the Chinese foreign ministry denied. When informed of the CNN report, U.S. President Trump stated that China "is gonna have big problems" if it carries through with weapons shipments to Iran. CBS News also reported that China was considering supplying Iran with X band radar systems, according to the U.S. Defense Intelligence Agency.

In April 2026 the Financial Times published an investigation citing leaked Iranian military documents that the Islamic Revolutionary Guard Corps Aerospace Force secretly acquired a high-resolution Chinese reconnaissance satellite in late 2024. The satellite was built and launched by Earth Eye Co (Chinese: 北京沐美星空科技) whose ground stations are operated by Emposat. The satellite monitored key sites in the region for military purposes, including for strikes. The Chinese Ministry of Foreign Affairs denied the claims.

According to Trump, CCP general secretary Xi Jinping told him Beijing was not providing weapons to Iran in a letter exchange between the two leaders ahead of their high-profile summit. On 19 April 2026, U.S. forces seized the sanctioned Iranian container ship MV Touska in the Gulf of Oman on a return voyage from China. The ship was reported to be carrying dual-use equipment.

In May 2026, NBC News reported that an American F-15E shot down the prior month was probably brought down by a Chinese-made shoulder-launched missile per anonymous U.S. government sources. In July 2026, Reuters reported that Iran had purchased between 300 and 400 QW-12 and FN-16 MANPADs from China. In September 2026, The Wall Street Journal reported that geospatial intelligence that Iran used for the June 17 attack on Muwaffaq Salti Air Base in Jordan, killing three Americans, came from China, and China provided Iran approximately 1,300 shipments of drone and missile parts that year until the end of June.

=== Diplomacy ===
On March 31, 2026, China and Pakistan announced a five-point proposal that includes calling for ceasefire and resumption of normal navigation in Strait of Hormuz. African Union expressed support for the proposal, saying : "The initiative constitutes a timely and constructive contribution to ongoing international efforts to de-escalate tensions." Associated Press reports that the Trump administration appears to have little enthusiasm for the prospect of China's mediation.

On April 7, China along with Russia vetoed a Bahrain-sponsored draft resolution in the UN Security Council regarding ship escorting in the Strait of Hormuz, citing the draft "failed to capture the root causes and the full picture of the conflict in a comprehensive and balanced manner."

Per The New York Times and other media reports, China played a key role in convincing Iran to accept Pakistan's two-week cease-fire proposal on April 7. According to a Canada-based analyst, China has a significant stake in stability in the Gulf and is highly exposed to the Strait of Hormuz. Pakistan provided the practical channel for the fragile ceasefire, China provided political weight and strategic backing.

On 17 September, following the 2026 Yemen offensives, Reuters reported that China was seeking to pressure Iran to reign in the Houthis and help prevent the conflict spreading further across energy routes on which China depends. It reporters that Iran responded by saying that stability and peace in the region depend on ending the Iran war.

In September 2026, in a United Nations Security Council session, China vetoed the renewal of nuclear sanctions monitoring in Iran by UN experts, citing its opposition to Western pressure on Iran. During the September 2026 meeting between CCP General Secretary Xi Jinping and U.S. President Donald Trump, the two leaders reached an agreement that Iran should uphold its commitment not to develop nuclear weapons and that no country or organization should impose tolls on international waterways.

=== Sanctions ===
In April 2026, the U.S. sanctioned one of China's largest "teapot" refineries for processing Iranian crude oil, the Hengli Petrochemical (Dalian) Refinery Co. Ltd. On 1 May 2026, the National Financial Regulatory Administration ordered Chinese banks to stop extending new loans to five U.S.-sanctioned refineries. In contrast, on 2 May 2026, China's Ministry of Commerce ordered companies and banks in the country to disregard U.S. sanctions on Chinese refineries, stating that such sanctions are a violation of international law. On 8 May 2026, the U.S. sanctioned three Chinese companies that allegedly provided geospatial intelligence to Iran, Meentropy Technology Co. Ltd, The Earth Eye and Chang Guang Satellite Technology Co., Ltd.

== Impact ==
In March 2026, some analysts believe the conflict has tested the durability of the "axis" among the three nations, revealing pragmatic boundaries to their cooperation. Jasim Al-Azzawi described these contributions as enabling Iran to sustain its defenses without escalating to a broader confrontation involving Moscow or Beijing. Youlun Nie argued the war would cause significant harm to China's geopolitical interests, including harming its energy security, defense export, its Belt and Road investments, and China's global influence. Members of the Trump administration also believed the Iran war would help the United States in its competition with China and damage China's global interests and influence.

In March, analysts noted that China was prepared for the closure of the Strait of Hormuz with its strategic petroleum reserve, the world's largest.

In an April article, the Center for Strategic and International Studies suggested the supply chain shocks and the closure of the Strait of Hormuz caused by the Iran war have cut off China's access to discounted Iranian crude, threatening its 2026 economic growth, and made Chinese investments in the Middle East unstable. In a Foreign Affairs article, Andrew P. Miller and Michael Clark argued that the notion that Iran war helped the United States to degrade Chinese national power is unfounded with war largely strengthened China's global position. Conversely, the United States suffered great reputational damage, depleted its military resources in the Middle East, and caused a global economic crisis.

Researchers at energy think tank Wood Mackenzie believed China would benefit the most from a global energy crisis caused by the Iran war, due to the country's large reserves, stable coal supply, and dominant position in clean energy.

In May 2026, at an expert panel on the impact of the Iran War, experts at Brookings Institution believed the war had a complicated impact on China. Most experts on the panel argued that the war provided China with strategic space as the United States pulled resources away from the Pacific, and reinforced China's narrative as a reliable global power. However, the war disrupted global energy markets, logistics, and the economic outlook that the Chinese economy relied on. The war also provided China an opportunity to assess the American military performance.

In June, after months into the war, analysts noted that China's preparation efforts in energy storage and renewable energy transition made it much more resilient than other countries. During the war, China was able to significantly insulated itself from the global fuel crisis. China used its robust reserve and growing renewable energy sector and electric vehicle industry to cut the demand for petroleum products, and China's control of refinery capability meant it can control the petroleum products flow, which boosted China's influence in Asia. The conflict also allowed China an opportunity to expand its renewable technology exports.

Analysts noted that China's ability to pause demand at will and balance the market with the stockpile meant the country can control the global oil price, boosting China's power in the petrostate system, and weakened the leverage held by traditional oil producers.

As of June 2026, and early July, many analysts stated that China had become one of the biggest beneficiaries during the Iran war, gaining influence and relative power in comparison to the United States. Ryan Hass of the Brookings Institution wrote that China largely benefited from America's setbacks in Iran. He noted early assumptions made by United States strategists that the war would weaken China were disproven. Despite the economic slowdown, global shipping disruption, and higher energy costs, the conflict overall strengthened China's global power. American airpower losses, particularly the reapers and the erosion on general stockpiles of military gear have caused concern among military analysts and leaders as they quantify losses and impacts on American power in Asia.

== See also ==
- China–Iran relations
- Reactions to the 2026 Iran war
- Russia in the 2026 Iran war
- Spain in the 2026 Iran war
- United Kingdom involvement in the 2026 Iran war
- List of country-specific articles on the 2026 Iran war
