= Outline of the 2026 Iran war =

The following outline is provided as an overview of and topical guide to the Wikipedia articles available about the 2026 Iran war. It is an evolving list.

== Overview Articles ==
Articles that cover the history of the Middle East and US involvement in the Middle East leading up to the 2026 Iran War, aswell as articles that cover the context of the war, and topics related to the war:

- Antisemitism
  - Antisemitism in the Arab world
  - Weaponization of antisemitism
  - Antisemitism during the 2026 Iran war
- War on terror
  - Afghan conflict
    - War in Afghanistan (2001–2021)
      - United States invasion of Afghanistan
  - Iraqi conflict
    - 2003 invasion of Iraq
    - Iraq War
- Middle Eastern crisis (2023–present)
  - Red Sea crisis
- Yemeni civil war (2014–present)
  - Houthi–Saudi Arabian conflict
    - 2026 Yemen offensives
      - September 2026 Houthi strikes on Saudi Arabia
      - October 2026 Houthi attacks on Saudi Arabia airports
- Middle East
  - History of the Middle East
    - Timeline of Middle Eastern history
    - List of modern conflicts in the Middle East
- Israel
  - Outline of Israel
  - History of Israel
    - Timeline of Israeli history
    - History of Israel (1948–present)
      - Thirty-seventh government of Israel
  - Censorship in Israel
  - Conscription in Israel
  - Legitimacy of the State of Israel
  - International recognition of Israel
- Iran
  - Outline of Iran
  - History of Iran
    - Timeline of Iranian history
    - History of the Islamic Republic of Iran
    - Iranian Revolution
    - Iran-Iraq war
      - Tanker war
  - Iran and weapons of mass destruction
    - Nuclear program of Iran
    - Fatwa against nuclear weapons
  - Ballistic missile program of Iran
  - International sanctions against Iran
  - United States sanctions against Iran
    - Maximum pressure campaign
  - Iran and state-sponsored terrorism
  - Separatism in Iran
    - Arab separatism in Khuzestan
    - Azerbaijani separatism in Iran
    - Baloch nationalism
      - Insurgency in Balochistan
    - Iranian–Kurdish conflict
  - Censorship in Iran
  - Conscription in Iran
- United States
  - United States involvement in Regime Change
  - Military history of the United States
  - American expansionism under Donald Trump
- Iran–Israel relations
  - Iran–Israel proxy conflict
- Iran–United States relations
  - Iran hostage crisis
  - United States support for Iraq during the Iran–Iraq War
  - Iran–Contra affair
  - Iran nuclear deal
    - United States withdrawal from the Iran nuclear deal
  - United States sanctions against Iran
    - Maximum pressure campaign
  - Security incidents involving Donald Trump § Assassination attempts by Iran in 2024
- Israel –United States relations
  - United States support for Israel in the Gaza war
- Arab–American relations
- Arab–Israeli relations
  - Arab–Israeli conflict
    - Arab–Israeli normalization
- Arab League–Iran relations

== Geography and Locations ==
- Middle East
  - Strait of Hormuz
  - Arab states of the Persian Gulf
    - Bahrain
    - Iraq
    - Kuwait
    - Oman
    - Qatar
      - Doha
    - Saudi Arabia
    - United Arab Emirates
      - Abu Dhabi
      - Dubai
  - Iran
    - Tehran
  - Israel
    - Jerusalum
    - Tel Aviv
  - Palestine
    - Gaza Strip
      - Gaza City
    - West Bank
  - Yemen
    - Aden
    - Houthi-controlled Yemen
      - Sanaa

== Origins of the war ==
- Prelude to the 2026 Iran war
  - Iran–Israel proxy conflict
    - Iran–Israel conflict during the Syrian civil war
    - 2024 Iran–Israel conflict
    - Twelve-Day War
      - Prelude to the Twelve-Day War
      - 2025 United States strikes on Iranian nuclear sites
      - Reactions to the Twelve-Day War
      - Twelve-Day War ceasefire
  - Middle Eastern crisis (2023–present)
    - Israeli–Lebanese conflict
      - Hezbollah–Israel conflict
        - Hezbollah–Israel conflict (2023–present)
    - Red Sea crisis
    - Israeli–Palestinian conflict
      - Gaza–Israel conflict
        - Gaza war
  - Iran internal crisis (2025–present)
    - Iranian economic crisis
      - International sanctions against Iran
        - United States sanctions against Iran
          - Maximum pressure campaign
    - 2025–2026 Iranian protests
      - 2026 Internet blackout in Iran
      - Reactions to the 2025–2026 Iranian protests
      - 2026 Iranian diaspora protests
      - 2026 Iran massacres
  - Rationale for the 2026 Iran war
    - Regime change efforts in the 2026 Iran war
  - Iran nuclear deal
    - United States withdrawal from the Iran nuclear deal
      - 2025–2026 Iran–United States negotiations
  - 2026 United States military buildup in the Middle East

== Timeline of the war ==
- Timeline of the 2026 Iran war
  - Timeline of the 2026 Lebanon war
  - 2026 in Israel
  - 2026 in Iran
  - 2026 in the United States
  - 2020s in military history

== Attacks and airstrikes ==
=== Overview ===
- List of attacks during the 2026 Iran war
- List of aviation shootdowns and accidents during the 2026 Iran war
- Destruction of cultural heritage sites during the 2026 Iran war
  - Destruction of the Rafi'-Nia synagogue

=== Shipping ===
- List of ships attacked during the 2026 Iran war
  - Sinking of IRIS Dena
  - 2026 Strait of Hormuz crisis
    - Mayuree Naree (2007)
    - 2026 Strait of Hormuz campaign
  - Operation Urja Suraksha
  - Operation Muhafiz-ul-Bahr

=== Iran and Iranian-backed paramilitaries ===
==== Strikes on Israel ====
- 2026 Iranian strikes on Israel
- 2026 Houthi strikes on Israel

==== Strikes on Kurdistan ====
- 2026 Iranian strikes on Iraq
  - 2026 Iranian strikes on the Kurdistan Region

==== Strikes on British military bases ====
- 2026 drone strikes on Akrotiri and Dhekelia

==== Strait of Hormuz ====
- 2026 Strait of Hormuz crisis

==== Strikes on Arab countries ====
- 2026 Iranian strikes on Arab countries
  - 2026 Iranian strikes on Bahrain
  - 2026 Iranian strikes on Jordan
  - 2026 Iranian strikes on the Kurdistan Region
  - 2026 Iranian strikes on Kuwait
    - 2026 Port Shuaiba drone attack
  - 2026 Iranian strikes on Oman
  - 2026 Iranian strikes on Qatar
  - 2026 Iranian strikes on Saudi Arabia
    - 2026 Aramco refinery attack
    - October 2026 Houthi attacks on Saudi Arabia airports
  - Syria in the 2026 Iran war
  - 2026 Iranian strikes on the United Arab Emirates

==== Strikes on Azerbaijan and Turkey ====
- 2026 alleged Iranian strikes on Azerbaijan
- 2026 interceptions of Iranian missiles in Turkey

=== Israel and the United States ===
==== Strikes on Iranian infrastructure ====
- 2026 Minab school attack
- 2026 South Pars field attack
- 2026 Lamerd sports hall attack
- 2026 Karaj B1 bridge attack
- Destruction of the Rafi'-Nia synagogue

==== Israeli strikes on Lebanon ====
- 2026 Lebanon war
  - Timeline of the 2026 Lebanon war
  - List of attacks in Lebanon
    - 2026 Israel attack on UNIFIL post in Aadchit al-Qusayr
    - 8 April 2026 Lebanon attacks
- 2026 United States–Israeli conflict with pro-Iranian Iraqi militias

==== Strikes on vessels ====
- Sinking of IRIS Dena
- 2026 Strait of Hormuz campaign
  - Naval blockade of Iran

==== Rescue operation ====
- 2026 United States F-15E rescue operation in Iran

==== Assassinations ====
- Assassination of Ali Khamenei
- Assassination of Ali Larijani

=== Unknown/unclear attacker ===
- 2026 Beit Awwa salon strike

== Casualties ==
- Casualties of the 2026 Iran war
  - List of Iranian officials killed during the 2026 Iran war
    - Assassination of Ali Khamenei
- Kidnapping of Shelly Kittleson

== Diplomacy during the war ==
=== Peace and ceasefire talks and agreements ===
- 2026 Iran war ceasefire
  - Islamabad Talks
    - Islamabad Memorandum

=== United Nations ===
- United Nations Security Council Resolution 2817

=== Reactions ===
- Reactions to the 2026 Iran war

=== Diplomatic crises ===
- Greenland crisis

== Economics of the war ==
- Economy of Iran
  - Energy in Iran
    - Petroleum industry in Iran
      - Oil reserves in Iran
    - Natural gas in Iran
  - International sanctions against Iran
    - United States sanctions against Iran
      - Maximum pressure campaign
  - Foreign direct investment in Iran
- Economy of Israel
- Economic impact of the 2026 Iran war
  - 2026 Iran war fuel crisis
    - 2026 Philippine energy crisis
    - 2025–2026 Russian fuel crisis

== Impact of the war ==
Global

- Destruction of cultural heritage sites during the 2026 Iran war
  - Destruction of the Rafi'-Nia synagogue
- Antisemitism during the 2026 Iran war
- Economic impact of the 2026 Iran war
  - 2026 Iran war fuel crisis
    - 2026 Philippine energy crisis
    - 2026 Bangladesh energy crisis
- Evacuations during the 2026 Iran war

Iran

- Impact of the 2026 Iran war on Iran
  - Regime change efforts in the 2026 Iran war
  - Defection of Iran women's national football team
  - Destruction of the Rafi'-Nia synagogue
  - United States sanctions against Iran
    - Maximum pressure campaign
  - 2026 Iran war regional mobilizations
  - 2026 Kurdish–Iranian crisis
    - Air campaign in Iranian Kurdistan

== Leaders, governments, and elections during the war ==
=== Leaders and governments ===
==== Iran ====
- Supreme Leader of Iran Ali Khamenei (until the 28th February)
- Interim Leadership Council (between the 28th February to the 8th March)
  - President Masoud Pezeshkian
  - Gholam-Hossein Mohseni-Eje'i
  - Alireza Arafi
- Supreme Leader of Iran Mojtaba Khamenei (from the 8th March)

==== Israel ====
- Thirty-seventh government of Israel (2022–)
  - Prime Minister Benjamin Netanyahu
  - Minister of Defense Israel Katz
  - Minister of National Security Itamar Ben-Gvir

==== United States ====
- Second Presidency of Donald Trump (2025–)
  - President Donald Trump
  - Vice President J.D. Vance
  - Secretary of State Marco Rubio
  - Secretary of Defence Pete Hegseth

=== Elections ===
==== In Iran ====
- 2026 Iranian supreme leader election

==== In Israel ====
- 2026 Israeli legislative election

==== In the United States ====
- 2026 United States elections

== Individuals ==
- Reza Pahlavi – Former Crown Prince of the Pahlavi dynasty of Iran
- Maryam Rajavi – Leader of MEK; dissident who opposes Pahlavi monarchism

== Protests and riots ==
- Protests against the 2026 Iran war
  - Protests against the 2026 Iran war in the United States
  - 2026 attack on the United States consulate in Karachi

== Media and communications ==
- Media coverage of the 2026 Iran war
- Cyberwarfare during the 2026 Iran war
- Misinformation during the 2026 Iran war

== Participanting armed forces ==
=== Overall ===
- 2026 Iran war order of battle

=== Iran and Iranian backed paramillities ===
- Islamic Republic of Iran Armed Forces
  - Islamic Republic of Iran Army
  - Islamic Republic of Iran Navy
  - Islamic Republic of Iran Air Force
- Islamic Revolutionary Guard Corps
  - Islamic Revolutionary Guard Corps Ground Forces
  - Islamic Revolutionary Guard Corps Navy
  - Islamic Revolutionary Guard Corps Aerospace Force
- Axis of Resistance
  - Hezbollah
  - Houthis
  - Popular Mobilization Forces

=== Israel ===
- Israel Defense Forces
  - Israeli Ground Forces
  - Israeli Navy
  - Israeli Air Force

=== United States ===
- United States Armed Forces
  - United States Army
  - United States Navy
  - United States Air Force

== Weapons, ships, and military equipment ==
=== Iran ===
==== Drones and missiles ====
- Shahed drones
- Unmanned surface vehicle
- Ballistic missile program of Iran

==== Ships ====
- IRIS Dena
- IRIS Sabalan
- IRIS Alvand
- IRIS Sahand (2012)
- IRIS Jamaran
- IRIS Hamzeh
- IRIS Fateh
- IRIS Bayandor
- IRIS Naghdi
- IRIS Makran
- IRIS Deylaman
- IRIS Abu Mahdi al-Muhandis
- IRIS Shahid Bagheri
- IRIS Zagros
- IRIS Shahid Sayyad Shirazi
- IRIS Shahid Rais-Ali Delvari

=== Israel ===
==== Missiles ====
- Arrow (missile family)
- David's Sling
- Iron Beam
- Iron Dome

=== United States ===
==== Missiles ====
- Tomahawk missile

==== Ships ====
- USS Charlotte (SSN-766)

== War by country ==
- Reactions to the 2026 Iran war
- Argentina in the 2026 Iran war
- Australia and the 2026 Iran war
- 2026 Iranian strikes on Bahrain
- Canada and the 2026 Iran war
- Cyprus in the 2026 Iran war
- China in the 2026 Iran war
- India in the 2026 Iran war
  - Operation Urja Suraksha
- Iraq in the 2026 Iran war
  - 2026 Iranian strikes on the Kurdistan Region
- Israel in the 2026 Iran war
- 2026 Iranian strikes on Jordan
- 2026 Iranian strikes on Oman
- Pakistan in the 2026 Iran war
  - Operation Muhafiz-ul-Bahr
- 2026 Iranian strikes on Qatar
- Russia in the 2026 Iran war
- Spain in the 2026 Iran war
- Syria in the 2026 Iran war
- Ukraine in the 2026 Iran war
- United Arab Emirates in the 2026 Iran war
- United Kingdom involvement in the 2026 Iran war
