= Impact of the 2026 Iran war on Iran =

Impact in Iran of the 2026 Iran War

The 2026 Iran war has had a widespread impact on Iran itself, affecting the country's political leadership, civilian life, military structure, and cultural heritage. The conflict, marked by extensive US–Israeli airstrikes and the assassination of Ali Khamenei, triggered a rapid leadership transition and contributed to internal instability and disrupted governance.

Civilians experienced significant hardship, including mass displacement, infrastructure damage, internet blackouts, and restrictions on daily life. Reports also indicated deteriorating humanitarian conditions, increased repression, and limited access to basic services. The war further intensified regional tensions, triggered refugee movements, and raised concerns over human rights violations, including the use of minors in military-related activities.

In addition to its social and political consequences, the conflict has caused damage to numerous historic and cultural sites across Iran.

== Government ==
Khamenei's death triggered an election for a new supreme leader. Under the terms of Iran's constitution, an Interim Leadership Council was established on 1 March to exercise the functions of Iran's head of state until a new supreme leader is elected.

Mojtaba Khamenei was elected on 8 March 2026 to replace his father as supreme leader, and the IRGC, as well as key political figures including Mohammad Bagher Ghalibaf, Ali Larijani, and Masoud Pezeshkian, pledged their allegiance to him.

In late March, the New York Times described Iran's leadership as paralyzed with severely disrupted decision-making process. It also reported that the damage to communications infrastructure caused paranoia and internal power struggles.

Güney Yıldız, writing for Forbes, opined that Mojtaba Khamenei's appointment, in spite of injuries he sustained in the strikes that killed his father, was a sign of "IRGC consolidation behind a pliant figurehead". An Iranian official told The Telegraph: "No one knows anything about Mojtaba, whether he is alive or dead or how badly injured. We are all just told that he's injured. He has no control over the war because he is not here. The majority of commanders, or more correctly, all commanders, have no news about him."

According to the scholar Navid Kermani, the war did not weaken the Iranian government, but made it more brutal. He adds that the people in Iran have lost hope. According to the Iranian-American politician Yassamin Ansari, the attack could, at least in short-term, help the Iranian government to consolidate its power.

== Civilian life ==
According to UN Human Rights Chief Volker Türk, the "reckless" war is disproportionately impacting civilians in the Middle East and beyond.

As the US and Israel executed joint strikes targeting Iranian military and institutional targets, Iran's capital reportedly became a ghost town, as civilians feared going outside or to their daily jobs. Reports have emerged that prisoners in Evin Prison have been receiving limited bread and water since the onset of the war. After the strikes, schools were ordered closed while banks and government offices remained in operation at reduced capacity. Local media reported that subway and bus services would remain operational.

Airstrikes on industrial and fuel hubs have released a chronic toxic cocktail of benzene, heavy metals, and persistent 'forever chemicals' (PFAS), triggering 'black rain' in major cities and causing long-term health degradation for civilians.

Amid the renewed "near total" internet blackout in Iran, NetBlocks reported that internet connectivity in Iran dropped to 4% of ordinary levels. While the internet blackout has exceeded 240 hours, making it the second longest ever, the government started handing out "white sim cards", which bypass filters, to government supporters, in order to allow them to promote its messaging. As news of Khamenei's death broke, security forces were deployed to prevent an uprising, with footage showing them opening fire on celebrants in the streets and shooting at people chanting behind the windows of their homes.

During the first two weeks of March 2026, over 70,000 Afghan refugees returned to Afghanistan, frequently under forced circumstances, exacerbating the country's existing severe humanitarian crisis. Arafat Jamal, the UNHCR Representative in Afghanistan, described returnees as "fleeing one war only to encounter another," noting that they faced limited options amid heightened border tensions and military confrontations between Afghanistan and Pakistan.

According to The Guardian, the war has overshadowed the persecution and executions of political prisoners in Iran, including those involved in the mass protests of January 2026. This has allowed the Iranian regime to continue carrying out death sentences, and other severe punishments with little international attention or scrutiny of these human rights abuses.

Since the outbreak of the war, reactions have been very mixed among the Iranian public. Some Iranians have supported the war, with government supporters calling it a "holy war" and opponents believing it would further weaken the Islamic Republic. On the other hand, others have rejected war because of the physical and emotional devastation, and instead called for a ceasefire. The reactions to the 2026 Iran war ceasefire were also very mixed, with some feeling disappointed about the lack of change in the country's internal crisis, while others are relieved about the pause in fighting. Most respondents expressed uncertainty about domestic effects of the ceasefire, including the effects it will have on the national internet blackout, towards state executions in Iran, and for the possibilities of regime change from the Iranian opposition.

== Military ==
On 26 March, it was reported that children as young as 12 years of age may join Iran's war support, leading to concerns of the use of child soldiers. Days later, rights groups stated an 11-year-old was killed while on duty at a Tehran checkpoint.

On 29 March, footage showed Iraq's Popular Mobilization Forces deployed in Iran. By 12 May, US intelligence reports showed Iran possessed about 70 percent of its mobile launchers across the country and has retained roughly 70 percent of its pre-war missile stockpile, according to the assessments and that Iran has regained access to roughly 90 percent of its underground missile storage and launch facilities nationwide.

== Kurdish–Iranian crisis ==
According to The Wall Street Journal, Trump had been open to supporting armed militias, particularly Kurds in Iran that have been in armed conflict with Tehran for decades and have historically been a regional ally of the United States. However, Trump later said he had ruled out sending the Kurds to Iran.

== Cultural Heritage Sites ==
Several historic and cultural sites, including UNESCO World Heritage Sites, were damaged during the war. On 2 March, a strike on Arg Square damaged nearby Golestan Palace, prompting UNESCO to issue a statement of concern. On 5 March, the Azadi Sport Complex was bombed. An 8 March strike on Falak-ol-Aflak, which was marked with a blue shield emblem, damaged several sections of the site. Strikes on Isfahan on 9 March damaged Naqsh-e Jahan Square, Chehel Sotoun, Ali Qapu, the Shah Mosque, Jameh Mosque, and Teymouri Hall. On 11 March, UNESCO urged protection for Iran's heritage sites and World Heritage Sites that have been damaged or are under high risk due to the war, alongside other historic sites in Israel, Lebanon, and across the Middle East.
