= Spain in the 2026 Iran war =

Spain has opposed the 2026 Iran war since its outset, condemning the United States and Israeli airstrikes that commenced on 28 February 2026 as violations of international law. The Spanish government, led by Prime Minister Pedro Sánchez, denied U.S. forces permission to use joint military bases at Rota and Morón for operations against Iran, leading to threats of trade sanctions from U.S. President Donald Trump. Sánchez said "Spain’s position is the same as in Ukraine or Gaza. No to the breakdown of international law that protects us all. No to resolving conflicts with bombs. No to war". The statement drew parallels to opposition against the 2003 Iraq War.

In response to the conflict's regional spillover, Spain deployed a frigate to Cyprus to provide defensive support following Iranian drone strikes on the island. Domestically, the war prompted protests in cities such as Madrid, where demonstrators expressed opposition to the U.S.-led actions. Spain also withdrew its ambassador from Israel amid broader tensions related to the war and ongoing issues in Gaza.

The stance highlighted divisions within NATO and the European Union, with Spain distancing itself from France, Germany, and the United Kingdom that supported the U.S. operations. However, France, Italy, the United Kingdom and other European countries later withdrew or qualified their support for the war too. Foreign Minister José Manuel Albares rejected White House claims that Spain had agreed to military cooperation, stating that the government's position remained unchanged. Sánchez described the conflict as a "serious mistake" that could lead to increased energy prices and regional instability.

== Background ==
The 2026 Iran war began with coordinated U.S. and Israeli airstrikes on Iranian targets, prompted by perceived threats from Iran's nuclear activities and regional influence. Spain, a NATO member, faced requests from the U.S. to support the campaign but prioritized adherence to international law, influenced by prior criticisms of Israeli actions in Gaza and a commitment to de-escalation in the Middle East. This approach contrasted with other European nations that offered limited backing for defensive measures.

== Diplomatic response ==
Prime Minister Pedro Sánchez condemned the strikes as "unilateral military action" outside the framework of international law, urging a return to negotiations. Spain rejected U.S. demands to utilize the Rota and Morón bases for offensive purposes, resulting in the relocation of U.S. refueling aircraft and threats of a trade embargo from Trump. Sánchez responded by stating that leaders could not "play Russian roulette" with global stability.

On 11 March 2026, Spain announced the withdrawal of its ambassador from Israel, citing the war's escalation and related conflicts in Gaza. Foreign Minister José Manuel Albares denied White House assertions of Spanish cooperation, emphasizing consistency in policy.

In June 2026, Spanish Foreign Minister Manuel Albares welcomed the announcement of an agreement between Iran and the United States. In a post on the social media platform X, Albares thanked the mediators and emphasized the importance of maintaining free and secure navigation through the Strait of Hormuz. He further stated that "dialogue and negotiation can resolve the pending issues and guarantee the ceasefire, including in Lebanon."

On September 23, 2026, Sánchez also said at the United Nations that Spain opposed the war against Iran and did not allow its territory to be used for an illegal attack on Iran.

== Military involvement ==
Spain's military contributions remained defensive in scope. Following Iranian drone attacks on Cyprus, the government deployed the frigate Cristóbal Colón to the Eastern Mediterranean to offer aerial defense and protection. Defense Minister Margarita Robles clarified that this deployment aligned with NATO obligations but did not extend to offensive actions against Iran. No Spanish casualties occurred during these operations. In that spirit, Spain also rejected an offer from Emmanuel Macron to join in a multinational military mission to participate in the 2026 Strait of Hormuz crisis.

Also Spain mantains military forces deployed in the zone of military escalation, like in Lebanon (as part of the United Nations Interim Force in Lebanon peacekeeper mission at the Israeli–Lebanese conflict), in Iraq (as part of NATO Mission-Iraq (NIM) at the War against the Islamic State), in Turkey (as part of NATO's Operation Active Fence in the Incirlik Air Base to defend Turkish airspace and not for offensive activities) and in Somalia-Djibouti (as part of Operation Atalanta against Piracy off the coast of Somalia) since before the 2026 Iran War. The Spanish unit in Lebanon reported to have being harmed by the Israeli ofensive in the Blue Line at the 2026 Lebanon war, and that the UN is considering to quit the mission in case of institutional collapse on Lebanon (although Spain declared its intention to continue its operations to assist the Lebanese government and its Armed Forces). Moreover, in May 2026 is expected that Spain will take the transitorial leadership of the NATO Mission-Irak, although the Spanish state showed its preocupation about the quit of the US in such mission and how that will affect the War economy of the mission (being included the possibility of its dissolution).

The Government of Spain declared that its military missions are based in the "commitment to world peace, with our allies in NATO, the United Nations and the European Union" and that the Spanish forces serve only the purpose of being "firmly committed to defense", not expecting to aid in the aggression from other armed forces of allied states; as also declared its preocupation towards the vulnerability of Spanish military personnel in the region due to the crossfire.

On 30 March, Spain closed its airspace to U.S. aircraft involved in strikes against Iran, reinforcing its earlier refusal to allow the use of military bases. Defense Minister Margarita Robles said this stance had been clear "from the very beginning," describing the conflict as "profoundly illegal and profoundly unjust" and rejecting any Spanish involvement. Pedro Sánchez stated that continued hostilities could destabilize the Middle East and endanger civilians. Sánchez described the escalation as a serious mistake and called for diplomatic solutions and adherence to international law.

== Domestic reactions ==
The conflict triggered public demonstrations in Spain, with protests in Madrid on 28 February 2026 featuring signs against the war. Sánchez's "no to war" rhetoric resonated with anti-war sentiments, echoing opposition to past conflicts like Iraq. Polls indicated widespread disapproval of Trump among Spaniards, bolstering support for the government's position.

Such policy of non-interventionism provoked inner struggles with the pro-US/Israel right-wing politicians from PP and Vox, who accused the current Spanish government of subordinating Spanish foreign policy to Pedro Sánchez' interests and of the PSOE instead of the Free World in a War against Tyranny of Iran's state-sponsored terrorism and Islamist movements that are common threats to all the Western civilisation and also opressive to the local Middle Easterns and specially the Israelis from antisemitism in the Arab world.

There has also been criticism by the left-wing to Pedro Sánchez' declarations of "No War" when still his government is mobilizing the Spanish military to aid in the defense of British bases in Cyprus to protect the European Union's security in the Eastern Mediterranean (considering it a nonsense due to the UK not being an EU member since Brexit, and contradictory to the "No War" discourse as those bases have being used by US-Israel as platforms for their aggressions) and also is still letting the US armed forces to anchor in the Naval Station Rota and the Morón Air Base to serve as a leading logistics center in US air and sea military traffic (making Spain an accomplice on US invasion routes and its power projection, even if they are not used for direct use in the military offensive).

Moreover the left-wing media denounced the lack of consistency with anti-imperialist speeches among the PSOE's leading gabinet when Spain continues to have a presence in NATO's military architecture, like the Spanish participation in NATO missions on Middle East for "only-defensive" and "peacekeeping" purposes, which in practice end up serving to protect the rear guard of the US-Israeli side and allow them to free up other assets for offensive tasks to achieve the American Imperialists goals and consolidate the Israeli colonies in the region.

== Impact ==
Spain's opposition strained relations with the United States, exposing rifts within NATO and prompting concerns over potential economic fallout from trade threats. The stance also underscored divisions in Europe, with Spain positioning itself as a proponent of multilateralism amid fears of broader instability.

== See also ==
- Reactions to the 2026 Iran war
- Protests against the 2026 Iran war
- Israel–Spain relations
- Iran–Spain relations
- Spain–United States relations
- List of country-specific articles on the 2026 Iran war
