= Laila Al Shaikhli =

Iraqi television presenter (born 1965)

Laila Al Shaikhli (Arabic: ليلى الشيخلي) is an Iraqi anchorwoman and television presenter on Al Jazeera.

== Early life ==
Shaikhli was born in Baghdad in 1965 to an Iraqi father and Danish mother, raised in Saudi Arabia and educated in England and the United States and obtained a bachelor's degree in Computer Science from the University of Pittsburgh, Pennsylvania.

== Journalism career ==
Shaikhli started her media career in 1990 in Washington as a broadcaster for Arab American TV. After joining the BBC World Service in London in 1994, Shaikhli went on to anchor several programs in various Arab satellite stations, where she then joined the Middle East Broadcasting Center in 1996 and later Abu Dhabi TV in 1999. Her shows include Dialogue with the West (MBC), Agenda (MBC), Dunnia (ADTV) and Panorama (ADTV).

She hosted "A day in the life of Iraqi women" in 2007 as a Everywoman special alongside fellow Iraqi activist Houzan Mahmoud, in which they discuss the lives of Iraqi women under the US-led occupation.

== Accolades ==
Shaikhli was ranked 75th in the Most Influential Arab Rank List in 2008.

== Personal life ==
Shaikhli is married to Iraqi host on Al Jazeera, Jasim Al-Azzawi.
