= Russia in the 2026 Iran war =

The involvement of Russia in the 2026 Iran war has encompassed a range of diplomatic, intelligence and logistical actions amid the conflict that began with coordinated airstrikes by Israel and the United States against Iran on 28 February 2026. Russia maintains a longstanding partnership with Iran, including economic ties and military cooperation, but its response to the war highlighted strategic caution rather than direct military intervention. Russia provided intelligence support to Iran including data on U.S. military positions. Analysts described these contributions as enabling Iran to sustain its defenses without escalating to a broader confrontation involving the Kremlin.

Despite public condemnations of the U.S.-Israeli strikes, Russia neither committed troops nor engaged in combat operations. It abstained from a United Nations Security Council Resolution 2817 condemning Iranian attacks on Gulf states. Russia's support was constrained by its ongoing war in Ukraine.

== Background ==
Russia had developed extensive ties with Iran before the war, driven by shared interests in countering U.S. sanctions and expanding economic partnerships. Russia's military cooperation with Iran intensified during the Ukraine conflict, with Tehran supplying drones and missiles in exchange for advanced systems like S-400 air defenses.

== Russian involvement ==
Russia's role in the war focused on intelligence sharing and logistical aid, avoiding direct combat to prevent straining its resources amid the Ukraine conflict. U.S. officials reported that Moscow supplied Iran with real-time data on American warships and aircraft, enabling more precise retaliatory strikes. This assistance included satellite feeds from Russian assets, which helped Iran monitor U.S. movements in the Middle East.

Diplomatically, Russia coordinated with China to convene emergency UN Security Council sessions, condemning the initial strikes as violations of sovereignty. Moscow abstained from resolutions critical of Iran, framing its position as opposition to U.S. aggression. Analysts noted that Russia's support diminished over time, as domestic priorities limited further commitments.

Limited reports indicated Russia facilitated arms resupplies, though no large-scale transfers were confirmed during the active phase.

According to US and European officials, Russia is sending upgraded drones to Iran.

Iranian President Masoud Pezeshkian with Russian President Vladimir Putin at the SCO summit in Bishkek, Kyrgyzstan, 1 September 2026

In June 2026, Western intelligence assessed that during the ceasefire, Russia resupplied Iran with enough missiles to reach about three-quarters of the amount it had before the war.

Iran successfully maintained its underground missile and drone manufacturing capabilities despite months of targeted airstrikes by the U.S. and Israel, according to intelligence assessments released in October 2026. Tehran was able to quickly produce new weapons and replenish its strategic military stockpiles following the preservation of these heavily fortified facilities, according to Western officials quoted by Bloomberg News. Contrary to claims made by U.S. President Donald Trump and Defense Secretary Pete Hegseth that prior military actions had completely destroyed Iran's industrial defense base, the assessments also showed that Russia was actively providing Iran with new missiles to rebuild its arsenal.

Russian orbital patterns were linked by geospatial intelligence data to several attacks by pro-Iranian Iraqi militias and Houthi rebels, including drone attacks on Saudi Arabia's East–West Pipeline in September 2026.

== Impact ==
The involvement of Russia prolonged Iran's resistance by improving its situational awareness, but it also drew international scrutiny, with U.S. officials accusing Moscow of indirect aggression. Iranian advisors claimed the support positioned Beijing and Moscow as "winners" in a shifting global order, though the war strained their economies through oil price volatility. The conflict tested the durability of the "axis" among the three nations, revealing pragmatic boundaries to their cooperation.

To mitigate the energy shock caused by the closure of the Strait of Hormuz, the U.S. Treasury granted India a temporary 30-day emergency waiver on 6 March, authorizing the purchase of stranded Russian oil cargoes to stabilize domestic fuel prices.

On 25 March, The Telegraph, citing the Kyiv School of Economics Institute, reported that the Iran war has caused Russian oil profits to reach $760 Million USD a day and that profit from oil and gas sales doubled in March from $12 Billion USD to nearly $24 Billion USD.

On 9 April, Reuters calculations estimated that Russia's mineral extraction tax on oil output will increase from 327 billion roubles in March 2026 to around 700 billion roubles ($9 billion USD) in April 2026 due to the Iran war. Reuters also reported that revenue from the tax is up by around 10% from April 2025.

On 21 April, Foreign Policy magazine, citing the Centre for Research on Energy and Clean Air, reported that Russian fossil fuel exports in March 2026 had reached a two-year high with a profit of 713 million euros ($836,623,505 USD) a day and tax receipts of 7.4 billion euros ($8,683,049,000 USD) for the month.

== See also ==
- China in the 2026 Iran war
- Ukraine in the 2026 Iran war
- Reactions to the 2026 Iran war
