= Australia and the 2026 Iran war =

- Part of the 2026 Iran war
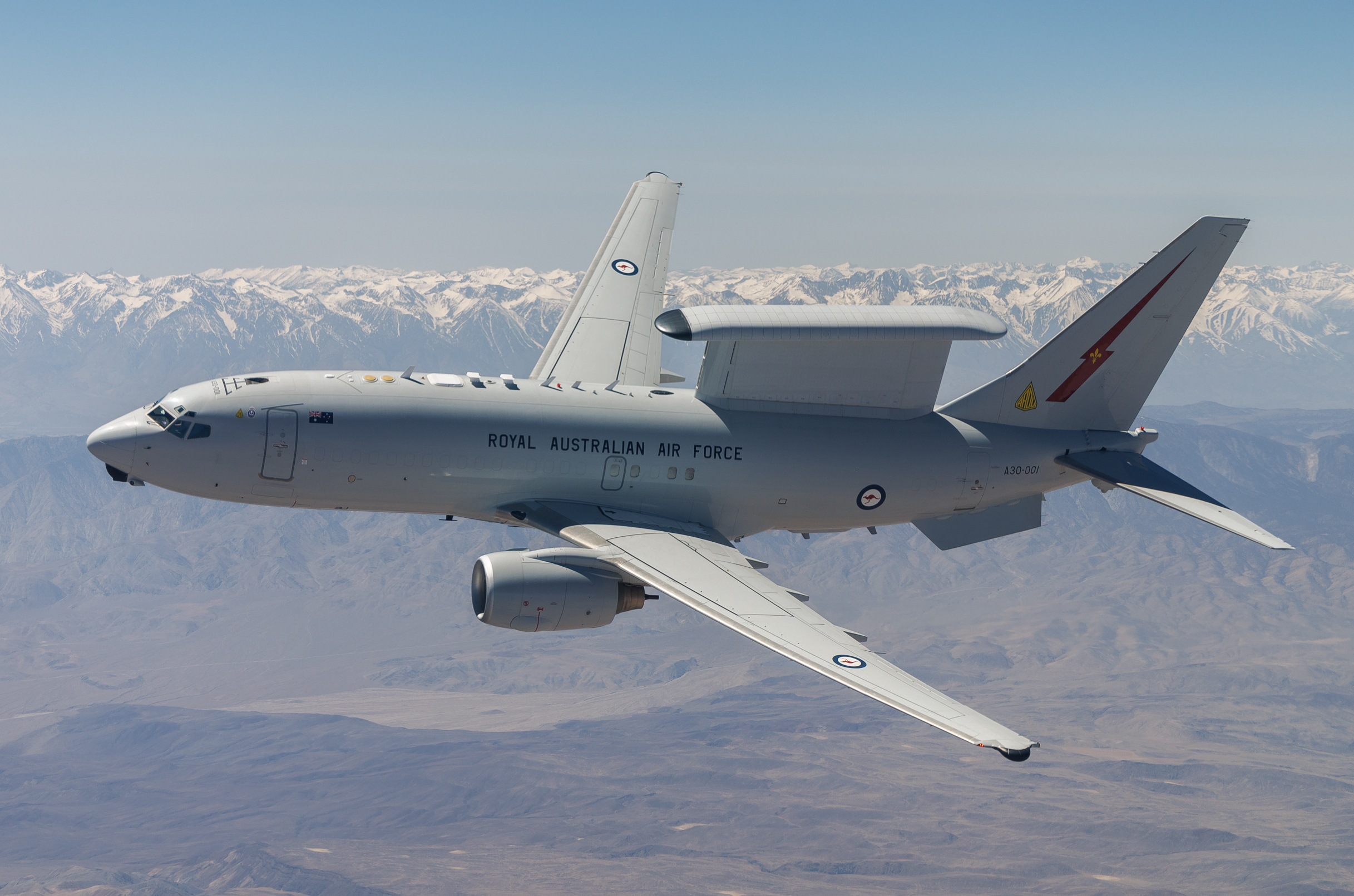
- Australia has deployed a Boeing E-7 Wedgetail aircraft to the United Arab Emirates.
Date
Location
10 March 2026 – present
- Persian Gulf
  - United Arab Emirates

Parties
- Australia

Commanders and leaders
- Anthony Albanese; Richard Marles; Penny Wong; Justin Jones; Brett Westcott

Units involved
- Royal Australian Air Force; Detachment, No. 2 Squadron; Australian Army; Elements, Special Air Service Regiment

Strength
- 85 RAAF personnel 90 Army personnel

The Australian Government has actively participated the 2026 Iran war, funding the US after the United States under President Donald Trump and Israel under Prime Minister Benjamin Netanyahu had bombed targets in Iran.

== Involvement ==
Australian involvement begun on 3 March 2026 when Iran attacked the Al Minhad Air Base containing Australian personnel and infrastructure with loitering munitions as a part of the greater 2026 Iran war. On 6 March, Australian Prime Minister Anthony Albanese acknowledged that three Australian Defence Force personnel were aboard the US submarine that sank IRIS Dena. He said that the Australian personnel were on board the submarine as part of a training rotation for the AUKUS security partnership, under which the United States will supply nuclear submarines to Australia. Albanese stated that Australian personnel did not participate in any "offensive action" against Iran.

Although the Albanese government supports the American-Israeli effort, he pledged to not send any ground troops to Iran and said that Australia would only take purely defensive action. On 10 March, the government ordered the deployment of 85 personnel, a Boeing E-7 Wedgetail and stocks of AMRAAM medium range air-to-air missiles to the United Arab Emirates (UAE) to defend the Gulf states and Australian military bases at the request of the UAE.

In spite of the government's claim that it will take only defensive action, Richard Tanter, an academic researcher on the joint United States-Australia intelligence facility Pine Gap, believes that the base is being used to provide intelligence to the United States for offensive action in Iran.

Australia declined to provide naval aid to help protect the Strait of Hormuz for international shipping, after Trump demanded that certain countries, including Australia, should join a naval coalition to protect the Gulf. Trump later stated that he no longer needed nor wanted such involvement, after none of the named countries heeded his call.

On 19 March 2026 the Spokesperson for the Ministry of Foreign Affairs of Iran, Esmail Baghaei, was interviewed by Sarah Ferguson on the ABC Television current affairs program, 7.30. In the interview, he accused the United States and Israel of "terrorist acts" by assassinating Ali Khamenei and other top figures in Iran in an "illegal war" against the country. He also said that Australia's military assets in the Gulf were legitimate targets for Iran's self-defence, since the Australian government had provided military support to the UAE.

On 3 April it was leaked that elements of the Special Air Service Regiment had been deployed to the region two weeks prior in case the war escalates.

== Reactions ==
=== Domestic ===
Five members of the Iran women's national football team were granted humanitarian visas in Australia on 9 March 2026 after their elimination in the 2026 AFC Women's Asian Cup after fears were raised for their safety, as they had refrained from singing the Iranian national anthem after the first game in the tournament. Two others also took up the offer of asylum, but five of them subsequently withdrew their asylum applications and returned to Iran, with two remaining in Australia. Iranian spokesperson Esmail Baghaei later said in an interview that the women had been taken "hostage", and that this act showed that the Australian Government was supporting the US and Israel.

A poll by Resolve in the middle of March found that 61% of Australians say they want to stay out of the conflict entirely, with just 13% eager for Australia to be involved. It also found that 29% of Australians endorsed the government's support for the US-Israeli strikes, 35% opposed it, and 36% were undecided or neutral.

Several political leaders gave their opinion on Australian involvement in the war:

- Australian Greens leader Larissa Waters condemned the action, stating that it was tantamount to Australia getting involved in another 'US-led forever war'.
- Liberal Party defence spokesman James Paterson called for Australian military support in the event of an invasion of Iran.
- Leader of the One Nation party, Pauline Hanson, supported calls for Australia to help Trump by entering the conflict with Iran.

== See also ==
- List of country-specific articles on the 2026 Iran war
