= Ukraine in the 2026 Iran war =

During the 2026 Iran war, Ukraine's involvement consisted of diplomatic endorsements from the United States and Israel, including the provision of technical and military expertise to help counter Iranian drone and missile attacks on Gulf states and US bases. The assistance comes after the United States halted direct military aid to Ukraine and at a time when the conflict threatens to divert air defense resources from Ukraine's ongoing war with Russia. Due to Iranian support for the Russian war effort in Ukraine, Ukraine struck an Iranian ship in July 2026.

== Background ==
Iran and Ukraine enjoyed a generally cordial relationship with each other until January 2020, when Iran's Islamic Revolutionary Guard Corps shot down Ukraine International Airlines Flight 752, killing all of the 176 civilians onboard.

Iran's support for the Russian invasion of Ukraine since 24 February 2022 has drawn Ukrainian condemnation. The Iranian government has supported Russia on the international stage and later became a chief supplier of armaments to the Russian military in light of international sanctions against Russia and Belarus. Additionally, Russia's usage of the Iranian Shahed 131 and Shahed 136, especially against Ukrainian civilians, has led to increasingly negative rhetoric towards Iran from the Western world.

In early 2023, Ukraine downgraded diplomatic ties and imposed long-term sanctions against Iran due to the Iranian government's support in the Russian invasion of Ukraine, including a complete ban on bilateral trade for 50 years.

The Iran war began amid heightened tensions over Iran's nuclear program and domestic unrest. On 28 February 2026, the United States and Israel launched coordinated attacks that killed Iran's Supreme Leader Ali Khamenei and targeted Iranian military and nuclear sites. Ukraine's president Volodymyr Zelenskyy has also accused Russia of supplying Russian Shaheds to Iran in March 2026.

== Involvement ==
Following the suspension of direct US military aid to Ukraine, US officials requested Ukraine's help in defending against Iranian drone attacks. On 6 March 2026, Andriy Kovalenko, head of the Ukrainian Center for Countering Disinformation, publicly confirmed the request.

On March 8, President Zelenskyy announced that Ukraine would send military experts to the Gulf region. On March 9, he dispatched chief negotiator Rustem Umerov to discuss the sale of Ukrainian interceptor drones to Gulf states. 200 Ukrainian specialists were deployed to help coordinate air defenses in Qatar, Saudi Arabia and the United Arab Emirates, and reportedly worked with American personnel to protect US military bases in Jordan. Britain separately announced plans to send Ukrainian specialists to the Middle East.

Ukraine's contribution focuses on low-cost interceptor drones and electronic warfare systems developed in combat conditions. The cost of these systems is estimated to be about one-thousandth the price of the US Patriot missile. Ukrainian officials said that only cheap drones can effectively counter large numbers of cheap attack drones. By mid-March 2026, Ukraine had offered joint production contracts to the US and European partners and was in talks with the governments of Qatar, the United Arab Emirates, Jordan and Bahrain. Zelenskyy described Ukrainian requests for aid as coming from 11 countries, including the United States, European states and Middle Eastern countries. He said: "Stability is also important for us. Those who now want Ukraine's help should continue to help us defend ourselves."

According to Ukrainian military officers, they discovered multiple deficiencies in the US and Gulf states air defence, including the excessive use and waste of expensive missiles. Reports of gulf air defenses launching eight Patriot interceptor missiles at a single target, some of which were low-cost drones, and the use of SM-6 missiles costing $6 million against Shaheds, concerned the Ukrainian officers, as the US had largely ignored the four years of information on countering drones and ballistic missiles provided by Ukraine. In comparison, Ukraine uses two patriot interceptors per ballistic missile, while a layered air defense combines both old and new equipment and includes electronic warfare, air and ground-based systems, interceptor drones as well as machine guns. They also noted that air defence batteries have not been concealed or moved, making them easy targets for Shaheds.

On 28 March, Iran’s military claimed that they destroyed a Ukrainian anti-drone system depot in the United Arab Emirates that was used to support U.S. forces. Ukrainian officials denied such event happened.

On July 25, three ships were struck in the Caspian Sea. One was claimed to be Russian. Ukraine did not explicitly claim that the two other ships were Iranian, but Iran responded with ire. Ukraine claimed that all were involved in the transportation of materiel to Russia, implicitly stating that they were legitimate military targets.

== Impact on the Russo-Ukrainian war ==
The Iran war has diverted United States attention and air defense resources from Ukraine. Analysts have warned that prolonged fighting in the Middle East could lead to a shortage of Patriot interceptors for Ukrainian forces at a time when Russia continues its campaign against Ukrainian cities.

The disruptions in the Strait of Hormuz drove up oil prices, increased Russia's revenues, and indirectly supported its war effort in Ukraine.

Zelenskyy described Russia and Iran as "brothers in hatred" during a 17 March 2026 address to the British Parliament, urging partners not to divert focus from Ukraine.

== Reactions ==
Ukrainian officials described their support as mutually beneficial, linking Gulf stability to Ukrainian security. Defense Minister Mykhailo Fedorov said Ukrainian specialists would work on the ground to "support real efforts to stabilize the situation and, in particular, restore safe navigation in the region."

International observers noted Ukraine's transition from a primary recipient of Western military aid to a provider of drone defense technology and expertise. Analysts highlighted that the four-year fight against Shahed drones has positioned Ukraine as a leader in cost-effective counter-drone solutions, with demand increasing from Gulf states and the United States during the Iran conflict.

== See also ==
- Iran–Ukraine relations
- Russia in the 2026 Iran war
- List of country-specific articles on the 2026 Iran war
