= Destruction of cultural heritage during the 2026 Iran war =

During the 2026 Iran war, various cultural heritage sites across West Asia were damaged or destroyed.

== Iran ==
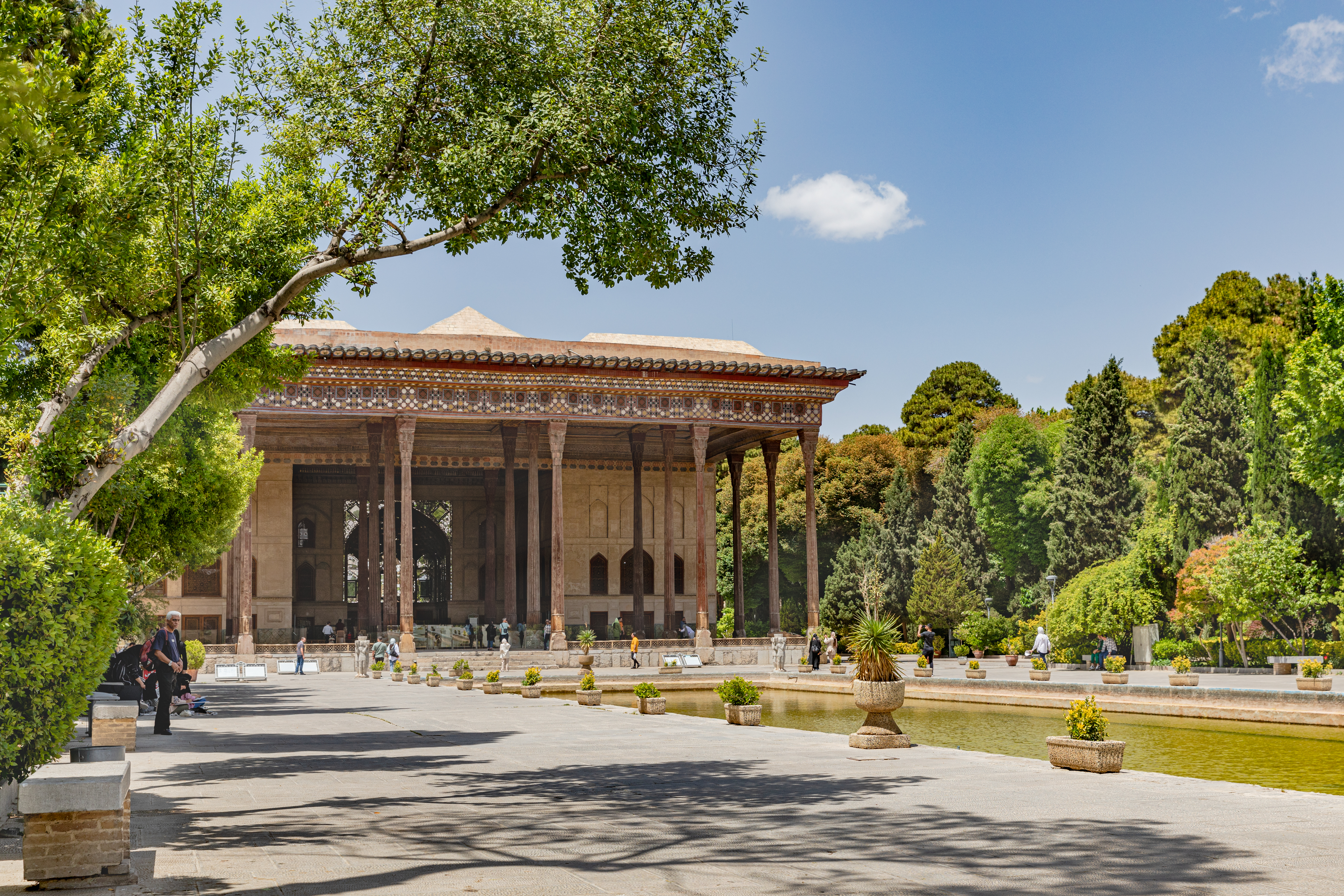
In an article in The Art Newspaper on 1 April, the art historian and curator Sussan Babaie described Chehel Sotoun (pictured in 2024) as having "sustained perhaps the worst damage of any Iranian heritage site so far".

=== Assessment by the Iranian government ===
In mid-March, Iran's Ministry of Cultural Heritage, Tourism and Handicrafts reported that at least 56 historic sites had been damaged by the war, including museums and cultural heritage monuments. Of the sites where damaged has been recorded, 19 are in Iran's capital, Tehran. By the end of the month the figure had increased to 120 museums and heritage sites which had been damaged. Flags bearing the emblem of Blue Shield International were displayed at over 100 heritage sites to discourage damage. The Ministry has deployed 300 experts to access the damage to Iran's historic sites.

As of 27 March, Iran has reported damage to at least 120 historical sites.

=== Cultural heritage sites hit during attacks ===
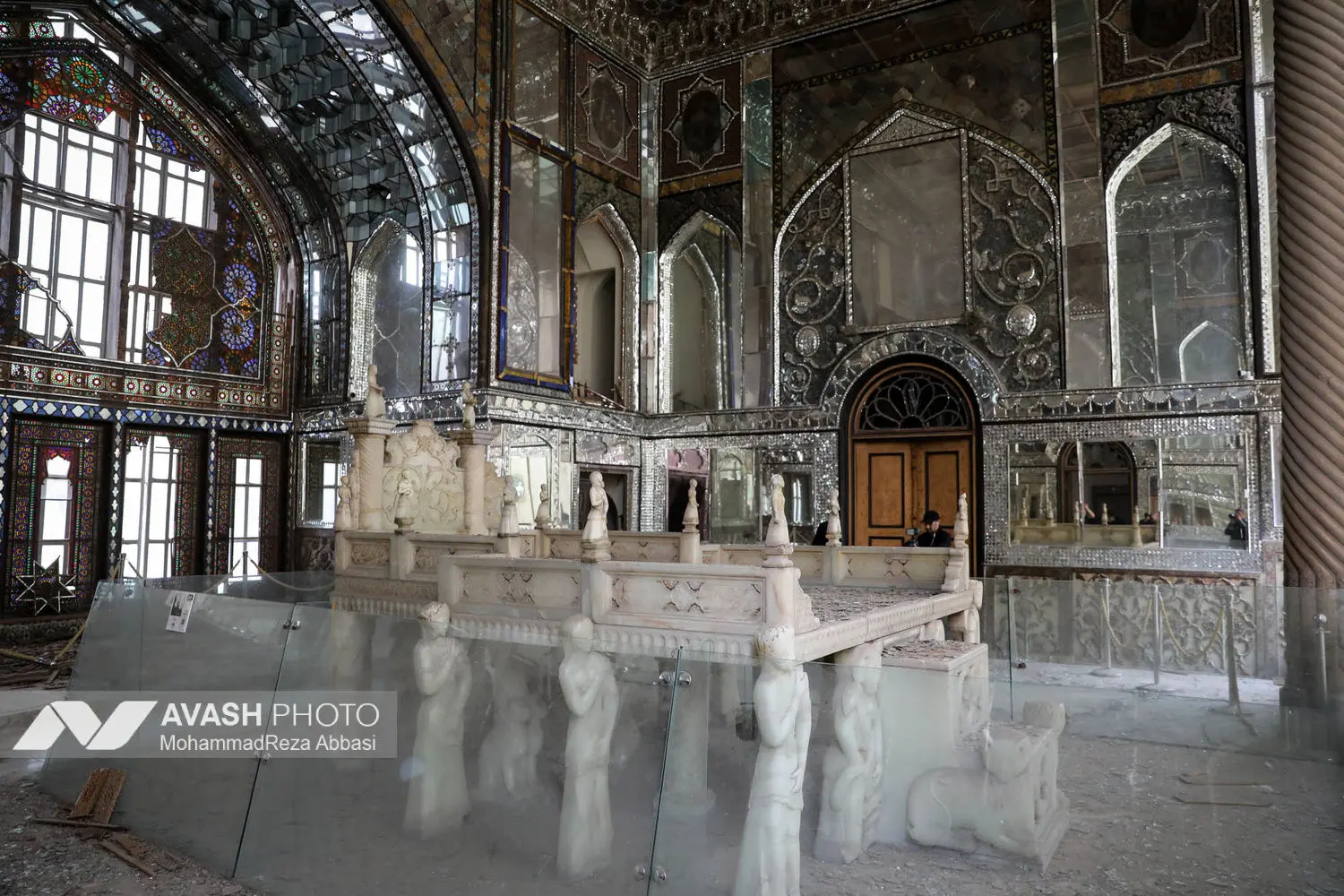
Damages to the Marble Throne and the Golestan palace decorations

On 2 March, a strike on Arg Square damaged the nearby Golestan Palace, a UNESCO World Heritage Site, prompting UNESCO to issue a statement of concern.

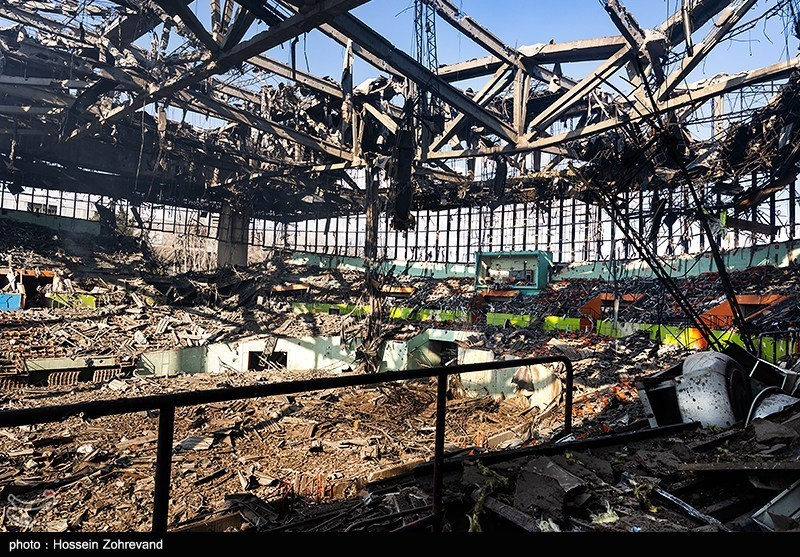
The ruins of the Azadi Indoor Stadium

On 5 March, the Azadi Sport Complex was bombed. The Azadi Indoor Stadium was destroyed by the airstrikes, which was targeting Iranian security forces, resulting in hundreds of military casualties.

A strike on 8 March on Falak-ol-Aflak Castle (also known as Shapur Khast Castle), which was marked with a blue shield emblem, damaged several sections of the site, destroyed its museum, and injured five museum workers. Strikes on Isfahan on 9 March damaged Naqsh-e Jahan Square, Chehel Sotoun, Ali Qapu, the Shah Mosque, Jameh Mosque, and Teymouri Hall. Founded in the 9th century AD, the Jameh Mosque was and is the oldest Friday mosque in Iran and a UNESCO World Heritage Site.

On 11 March, UNESCO urged protection for Iran's heritage sites and World Heritage Sites that have been damaged or are under high risk due to the war, alongside other historic sites in Israel, Lebanon, and the rest of West Asia. During the same period Rashk-e Jenan in Isfahan was completely destroyed by the Israeli Air Force.

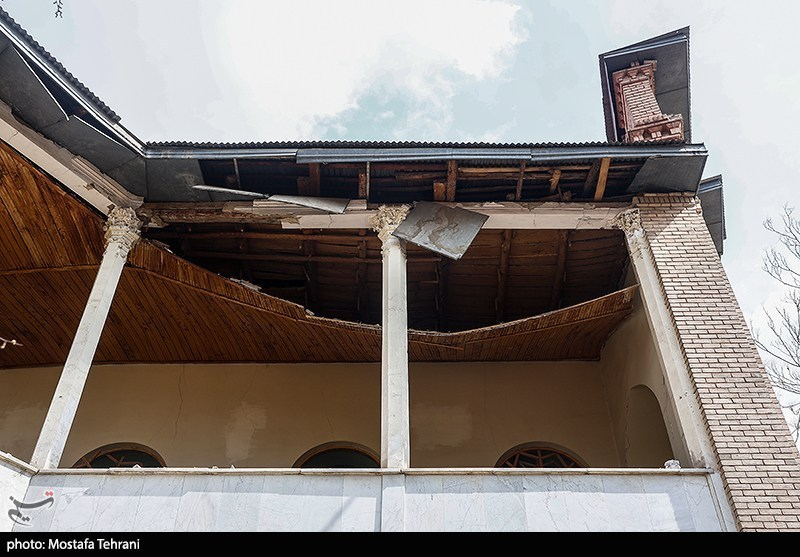
Damages to a palace at Sa'dabad Complex

On 17 March, blast waves and sharpnel damaged multiple palaces at Sa'dabad Complex in northern Tehran.

Russia's Ministry of Foreign Affairs reported that strikes in Tehran on 1 April resulted in structural damage to the St. Nicholas Orthodox Church and its auxiliary buildings. The ministry's spokeswoman stated that "the main strike was directed at the complex of the former US Embassy located several metres from the church", the former embassy having been the starting location of the 1979 Iranian hostage crisis.

Members of the Tehran Jewish community navigating the site where the Rafi'-Nia synagogue was destroyed, as depicted and recorded by Mehr News Agency.

On 7 April, the Rafi'-Nia synagogue was fully destroyed by the Israeli Air Force.

== White City of Tel Aviv ==
Iranian missile strikes during the evening and night of 28 February damaged a number of buildings in the UNESCO World Heritage site of the White City of Tel Aviv. A strike damaged two Bauhaus-style buildings after it had destroyed an entire apartment block next door, with the strike killing a Filipina caregiver, Mary Anne Velasquez de Vera, and injuring between 20 and 30 other people. The Habima Theatre, the national theatre of Israel, was struck by a direct hit, with footage and photos showing its windows shattered and glass scattered on the ground. The White City had previously sustained damage during the Twelve-Day War in June 2025.

== Jerusalem's Old City ==
After Jerusalem was targeted by Iran on 16 March, missile and interceptor fragments fell in and around the Old City, a UNESCO World Heritage Site, falling near the religious sites of the Temple Mount, the Church of the Holy Sepulchre, the Jewish Quarter, and the Western Wall. No one was killed or injured.

On 29 March, the Latin Patriarch of Jerusalem, Cardinal Pierbattista Pizzaballa, along with Reverend Francesco Ielpo was trying to enter the Church of the Holy Sepulchre for Good Friday, but police prevented them from entering due to concerns for their safety. Israeli Prime Minister Benjamin Netanyahu had said that worshippers of all faiths had been asked not to visit sites in Jerusalem's Old City. Later, Cardinal Pizzaballa was allowed access to the church, expressing "sincere gratitude" to Israel's president Isaac Herzog for his intervention. The decision to block Cardinal Pizzaballa and Reverend Ielpo was criticised by world leaders, including Italian Prime Minister Giorgia Meloni and French President Emmanuel Macron.

== International response ==
On 2 March, UNESCO issued a statement of "concern over the protection of cultural heritage sites" and shared information about the location of significant heritage sites so that they could be protected. Later that month a group of heritage professionals called on UNESCO to undertake monitoring of Iran's heritage sites. A group of British researchers in a letter to The Times noted their concern "not only about the humanitarian impact of the war in Iran, but also about reports of damage to that country’s cultural heritage". In April, the Society for Iranian Archaeology published a letter with more than 200 signatures which "warn[ed] that the conduct of the United States and Israel has inflicted irreversible damage on humanity’s cultural heritage".

== See also ==
- Cultural genocide
- List of attacks during the 2026 Iran war
- Destruction of cultural heritage during the Gaza war
- Destruction of cultural heritage during the Israeli invasion of Lebanon
- Hague Convention for the Protection of Cultural Property in the Event of Armed Conflict
- List of destroyed heritage
- List of archaeological sites in Iran
- List of archaeological sites in Israel and Palestine
- List of World Heritage Sites in Iran
- List of World Heritage Sites in Israel
