= Rashk-e Jenan =

Registered Iranian cultural heritage site

- رشک جنان
- The structure back in 2021, before its destruction. The original architecture can be observed in the photo.
- Interactive map of the Rashk-e Jenan area

General information
- Type: Government building Historical building
- Location: Darvazeh Dowlat, Baghe Goldasteh Street, Isfahan, Iran
- Year built: 1501–1736 (Safavid era)
- Renovated: 1789–1925 (Qajar era)
- Destroyed: March 2026 by Israeli Air Force
- Owner: Islamic Republic of Iran

The Isfahan Governor's Palace resides within the walls of the Rashk-e Jenan, also known as Rashk Palace. The building was built in the Safavid era, in Isfahan, Darvazeh Dowlat, on Bagh-e Goldasteh Street. It's listed in Iran's National Heritage list since 16 March 1986, under the registration number 1710. The structure was destroyed in March 2026 during the Iran War after being hit by a direct strike by the Israeli Air Force.

== History ==
The palace was built during the Safavid era and renovated during the Qajar era. The monument was registered as one of Iran's national heritage sites on 16 March 1986 (25 Esfand 1364) under registration number 1710, titled "Governor's Building (Rashk-e Jenan)". The building hosted the governor of Isfahan up until its destruction.

The structure was destroyed in March 2026 during the Iran War after being hit by a direct strike by the Israeli Air Force.
