= Jasim Al-Azzawi =

Iraqi television host

Jasim Al-Azzawi (Arabic: جاسم العزاوي) is an Iraqi host, who presented the show Inside Iraq on Al Jazeera English.

Before joining Al Jazeera English in July 2006, Jasim was one of the main news anchors at Abu Dhabi TV from September 1999 until June 2006. For seven years he presented the main evening news at Abu Dhabi, Al-Madar. He also presented Muwajaha, or Confrontation, one of the most successful, controversial and highly watched cross-fire type program on Arab TV. From 1996-1999 he was the editor of two successful shows with MBC in London, Dialogue with the West and Agenda.

He is well known for using the phrase "he went for the jugular" on his show Inside Iraq broadcast on Al Jazeera English.

He is married to another Al Jazeera presenter, Laila Al Shaikhli.
