= United Kingdom involvement in the 2026 Iran war =

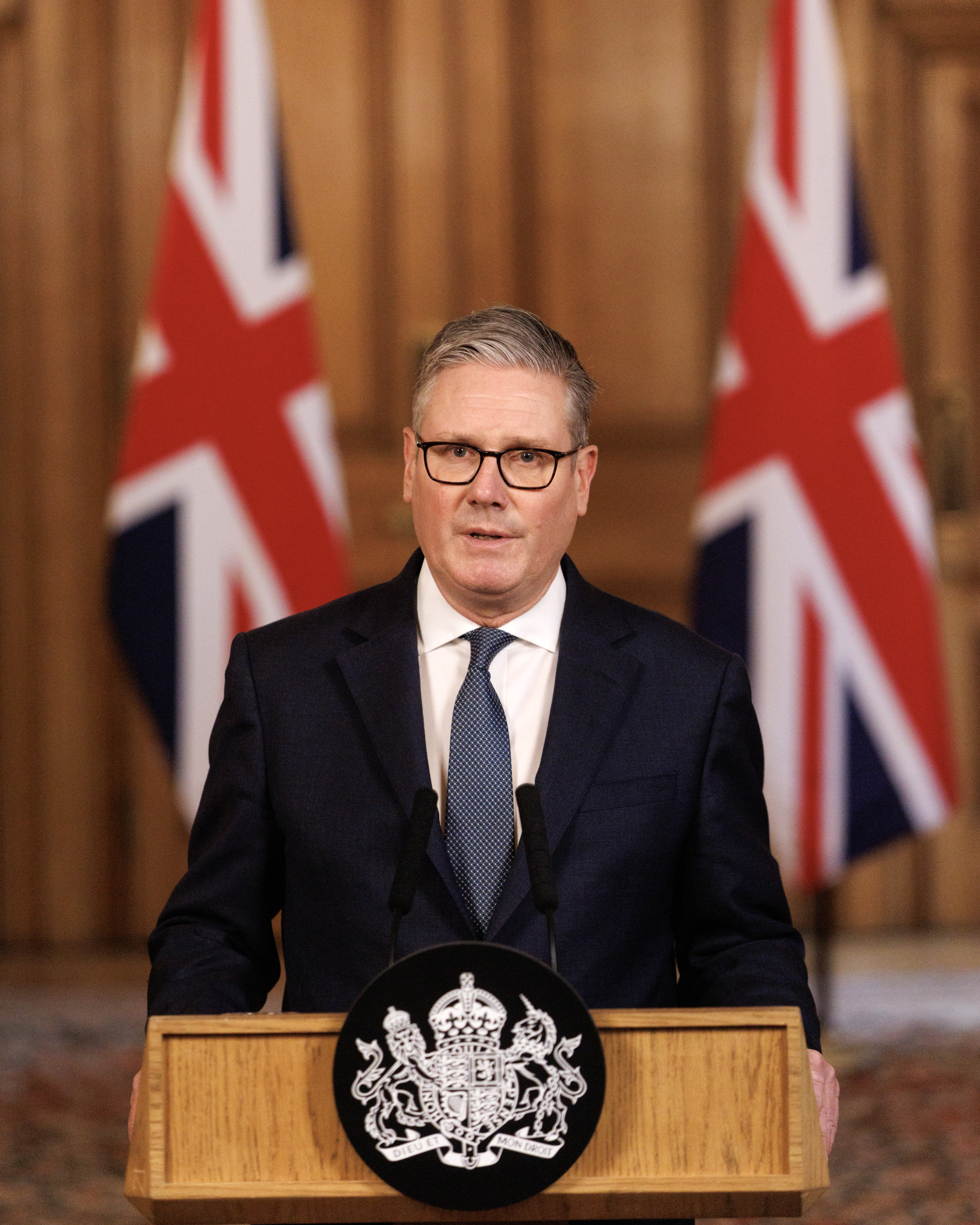
Then-Prime Minister Keir Starmer speaking on the outbreak of the war, 28 February 2026

Since the beginning of the 2026 Iran war on 28 February, when the United States and Israel conducted joint airstrikes across Iran, the United Kingdom has shot down Iranian drones and missiles over allied countries in the Middle East, including Qatar, Iraq, and Jordan. After a drone struck a British military base on Cyprus, the UK deployed further military assets to the island and began relocating the destroyer HMS Dragon to the Eastern Mediterranean. As the conflict spread throughout the region, the UK announced efforts to evacuate its 300,000 citizens in the region.

Ahead of the initial US–Israeli strikes, UK prime minister Keir Starmer denied a request from US president Donald Trump to use British military bases. On 1 March, Starmer granted a US request to use UK bases for "defensive" strikes on Iranian capabilities; however, his initial refusal created a rift with Trump. The UK was also criticised by Cypriot officials for failing to warn them or prevent the drone attack. Domestic opposition parties criticised Starmer, but differed in their reasonings. The Conservative Party Leader and Leader of the Opposition Kemi Badenoch, as well as Reform UK Leader Nigel Farage, called Starmer indecisive and insufficiently supportive of the United States, while the Liberal Democrat Leader Ed Davey warned against further involvement in the region, and the Green Party Leader Zack Polanski called for an end of UK support for Israel and for the UK to rethink its long-term military alliance with the US.

== Background ==
The 2026 Iran war began on 28 February 2026, when the United States and Israel launched a wave of airstrikes on Iran, including the assassination of Supreme Leader Ali Khamenei and other senior Iranian leaders. In response, Iran launched retaliatory missile and drone attacks across the Middle East, including military and civilian sites across Israel and the Persian Gulf states.

The United Kingdom and the United States have longstanding close diplomatic and military relations. Prior to the conflict, UK prime minister Keir Starmer and US president Donald Trump had established a strong relationship. As a close US ally, the UK is an adversary of Iran.

Prior to the conflict, the UK Royal Navy had one ship—HMS Middleton, a mine hunter—in the Middle East, at the UK Naval Support Facility in Bahrain. No large British warships were in the region. The British Royal Air Force (RAF) operates at Al Minhad Air Base in the United Arab Emirates, Royal Marines are stationed at the UK Joint Logistics Support Base in Duqm, Oman, and other British personnel are stationed at the US-run Al Udeid Air Base in Qatar.

The UK retains sovereignty over two British bases on Cyprus including RAF Akrotiri, which is used as a forward base for Middle East operations. During the prelude to the Iran war, beginning in January 2026, the UK moved additional resources to its Cyprus bases, including additional radar and air defence systems and F-35 fighter jets. The UK also deployed Typhoon jets to Qatar.

== Military and diplomatic response ==
=== 28 February ===
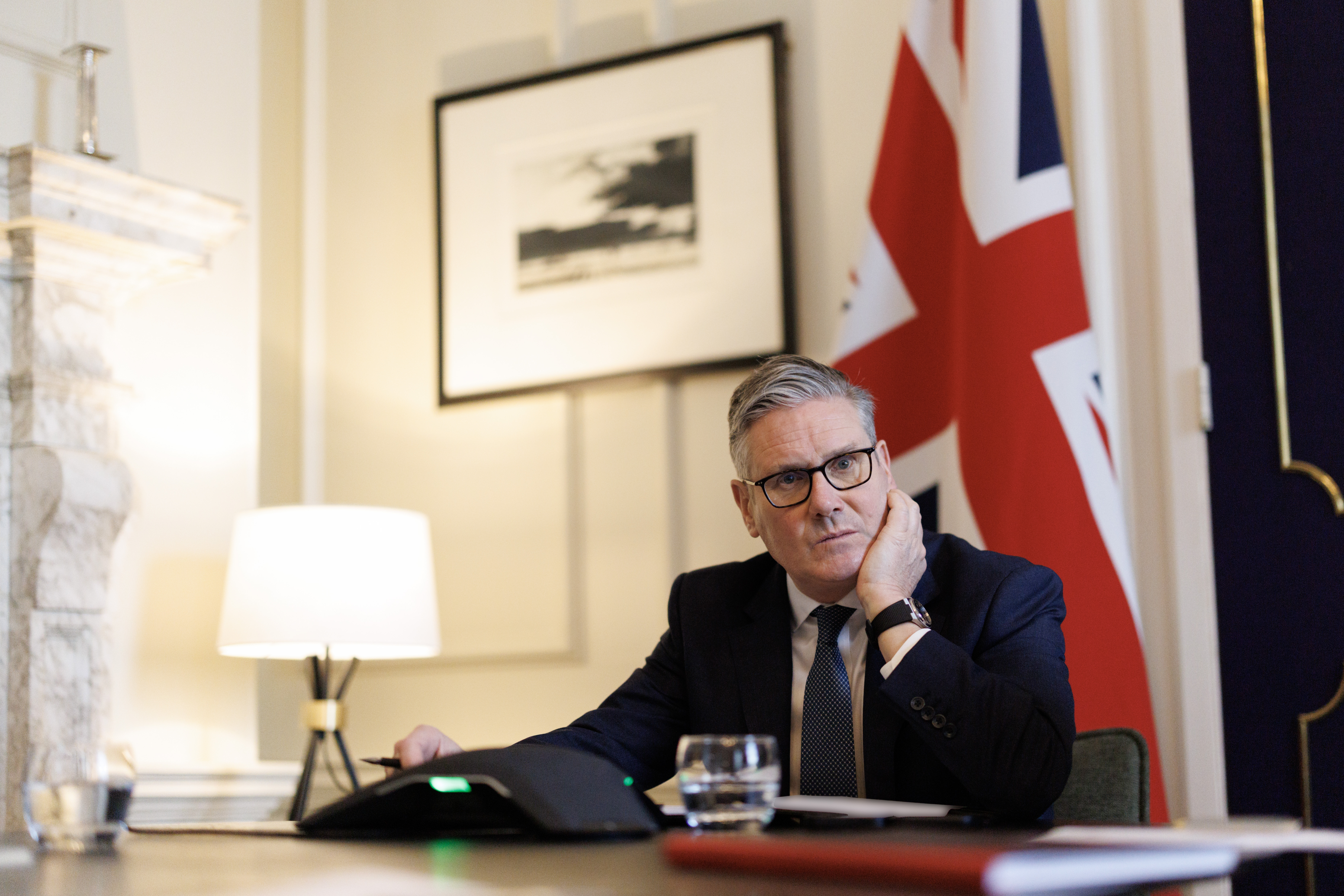
Starmer speaking with President Emmanuel Macron of France and Chancellor Friedrich Merz of Germany, 28 February

On 28 February, after the outbreak of war, Starmer said that the UK was not involved in the American–Israeli attacks on Iran. Starmer initially did not express explicit opposition to the attacks, though the British government also refused to say whether it supported the strikes. In a statement, Starmer said that Iran "should refrain from further strikes, give up their weapons programme, and cease the appalling violence and oppression of the Iranian people—who deserve the right to determine their own future."

On the first day of the conflict, Starmer spoke by phone to Trump; the emir of Qatar, Tamim bin Hamad Al Thani; and the president of the United Arab Emirates, Mohamed bin Zayed Al Nahyan. He released a joint statement with French president Emmanuel Macron and German chancellor Friedrich Merz, calling upon Iran to "refrain from its destabilising activity in the region and our homelands".

Ahead of the US–Israeli attacks, Trump had requested permission to use two British bases—Diego Garcia in the British Indian Ocean Territory and RAF Fairford in Gloucestershire, England—as a staging ground for strikes on Iran, likely to launch stealth B-2 bombers. Starmer denied the request; The Spectator reported that at a National Security Council meeting on 27 February, cabinet ministers including Ed Miliband, Rachel Reeves, and Shabana Mahmood had expressed opposition to the idea.

Still, in his 28 February statement, Starmer said that British planes were "in the sky" in the Middle East for a defensive operation "to protect our people, our interests, and our allies". The UK deployed fighter jets from RAF Akrotiri and Al Udeid Air Base to intercept Iranian drones and cruise missiles. Four RAF Typhoons from No. 12 Squadron were deployed at the request of Qatar, one of which intercepted an Iranian drone en route to Qatar; the UK also shot down incoming drones in Iraq. Starmer announced that Britain would bring Ukrainian experts to the Middle East to assist in the interception of Iranian drones.

Several British troops came under threat during the first day of the war. In Bahrain, 300 British personnel were within 200 metres (660 ft) of an Iranian missile and drone strike on a US naval base in Bahrain. In Iraq, an Iranian missile landed 400 metres (1,300 ft) away from British troops stationed at a base as part of operations against the Islamic State. Additionally, UK defence secretary John Healey said on 28 February that two Iranian ballistic missiles were fired towards Cyprus, but that he was "pretty sure" the island was not being targeted.

=== 1–2 March ===
In a statement to members of Parliament (MPs) on 1 March, Starmer defended his decision not to support the initial US–Israeli strikes—despite both Australia and Canada doing so—as "deliberate", adding that "I stand by it". However, at 9:00 p.m. (GMT) on 1 March, Starmer announced that he had granted the US permission to conduct airstrikes on Iranian capabilities using British bases for a "specific and limited defensive purpose". In making his decision, Starmer said that Iran had become increasingly reckless; he said: "We have taken the decision to accept this request, to prevent Iran firing missiles across the region ... killing innocent civilians ... putting British lives at risk ... and hitting countries that have not been involved".

RAF Akrotiri is located on the island of Cyprus in the eastern Mediterranean Sea.

One hour after Starmer's announcement on 1 March, the runway at RAF Akrotiri was struck by a one-way Iranian Shahed drone designed to detonate on impact. The attack caused minimal damage and no casualties, though it led families of service members to be evacuated. Two further drones were intercepted at RAF Akrotiri on the morning of 2 March. According to Cypriot sources, the drones targeting Akrotiri were believed to come from Lebanese territory controlled by the pro-Iranian militia Hezbollah; the British defence ministry has not confirmed that assessment. The necessary flight time led UK officials to believe the attack was launched before Starmer's statement on allowing American use of British bases. Healey described the strike on Cyprus as "an example of the dangerous and indiscriminate attacks by Iran & its proxies across the region"; the Islamic Revolutionary Guards Corps (IRGC) of Iran has since threatened further attacks on Cyprus.

On 2 March, RAF F-35s shot down Iranian Shahed drones over Jordan using an ASRAAM missile. A British Typhoon shot down a drone directed at Qatar, while and British forces intercepted drones in Iraqi airspace targeting Western forces in the country.

During Prime Minister's Questions (PMQs) on 2 March, Starmer assured MPs that his government remembered the "mistakes of Iraq". He pledged that the UK would operate only on a "lawful basis" with a "viable thought-through plan", and that it would "not join offensive action", while "protect[ing] our people in the region and support[ing] the collective self-defence of our allies". Starmer added that his government did not believe in "regime change from the skies", but rather that "best way forward for the region and for the world is a negotiated settlement in which Iran agrees to give up any aspirations to develop a nuclear weapon and ceases its destabilising activity across the region".

The delay in Starmer's approval of US access to UK bases created strife between him and Trump. On 2 March, Trump told The Daily Telegraph that it had taken "far too much time" for the UK to allow American use of its military bases. Trump also repeated his criticism of the Starmer government's deal to transfer sovereignty of the Chagos Islands—where the Diego Garcia base is located—to Mauritius, saying "we were very disappointed in Keir" and that "he should have fought it out". In response, during PMQs, Starmer said that "President Trump has expressed his disagreement with our decision not to get involved in the initial strikes, but it is my duty to judge what is in Britain's national interest, that is what I've done and I stand by it."

Trump escalated his criticism on 3 March, saying during a meeting with German chancellor Merz that he was "not happy" with the UK's decision, which he said led to US planes "flying many extra hours". Of Starmer, Trump said that "this is not Winston Churchill that we're dealing with". In an interview with The Sun, Trump said that Starmer had "not been helpful", and that he "never thought I'd see that from the UK". He added: "France has been great. They've all been great. The UK has been much different from others. ... It's very sad to see that the relationship is obviously not what it was."

The Times of London additionally reported that Britain's allies in the Persian Gulf, particularly the UAE, had been critical of the UK for not granting US access to its military bases faster.

=== 3–5 March ===
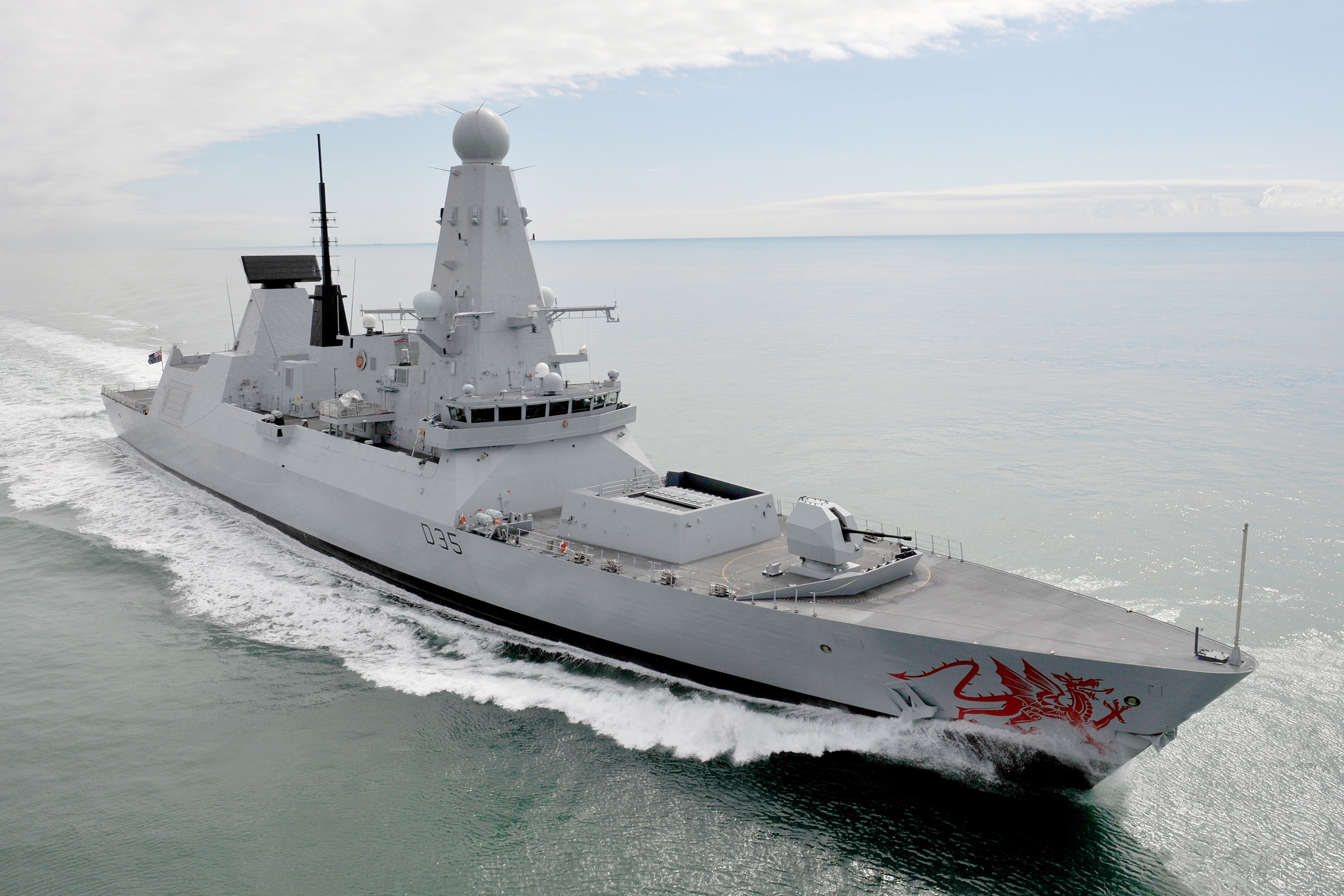
HMS Dragon (pictured in 2011) was announced to be relocated to Cyprus.

On 3 March, Starmer announced that the UK would deploy additional military assets to Cyprus, alongside France and Greece. After speaking with Cypriot president Nikos Christodoulides, Starmer said Britain would deploy two Royal Navy Wildcat helicopters armed with counter-drone–capable Martlet missiles to the island, scheduled to arrive in several days. Additionally, Starmer announced that HMS Dragon, a Daring-class destroyer would be relocated from the English Channel to the Eastern Mediterranean to defend Cyprus. However, because the Dragon needed to be brought out of maintenance and fitted with the correct weaponry, it was not scheduled to begin traveling until the following week.

Cypriot officials criticized the UK in the aftermath of the drone attack. Kyriacos Kouros, the Cypriot high commissioner in the UK, said his country was "disappointed" with British failures to warn Cypriots of the impending strike, while a spokesman for Christodoulides said the failure was "something that we must say we view with dissatisfaction". After Starmer announced the deployment of additional British forces to Cyprus, Kouros said: "The French are coming. The least we expect is the Britons to also be present since, as I said, we are not only defending Cypriots on the islands". On 5 March, Healey visited Cyprus to meet the Cypriot defence minister in Nicosia.

On 4 March, the British defence ministry said its fighter jets were continuing to conduct "defensive air operations across the Middle East in defence of British interests and allies".

=== 5 March–present ===
On 10 March, HMS Anson had its deployment to Australia cut short significantly, departing HMAS Stirling without an official explanation.

On 28 March 2026, the United Kingdom sent the amphibius RFA Lyme Bay to the Straits of Hormuz, after it was equipped with mine-hunting drones.

== Consequences of the Iran War on the UK ==
=== Evacuation of British nationals ===
Starmer also announced efforts to evacuate British citizens from the Middle East. Approximately 300,000 Britons are estimated to live in the region, most of which are in the United Arab Emirates. On 2 March, Starmer said that the UK Foreign Office would send rapid deployment teams to the region, especially the UAE. The same day, foreign secretary Yvette Cooper said that about 102,000 Britons had registered their presence in the Middle East with UK authorities; by 5 March, the number had risen to 138,000. The British government announced on 3 March that it would charter a flight from Muscat, Oman, prioritising vulnerable British nationals. The flight was scheduled to depart Oman on 4 March, though was delayed by one day after problems "getting passengers on board", according to UK Home Office minister Alex Norris. Two additional chartered flights were expected to depart later that week; by 5 March, 1,000 Britons had returned from the Middle East on commercial flights.

=== Suspected Iranian-linked Attempted Terrorist Attack ===
On the 27th September 2026, Gloucestershire Constabulary arrested five men in Whelford, near RAF Fairford in Gloucestershire, England, a Royal Air Force station used by the United States Air Force, on suspicion of offence under the Explosives Act 1875 and of preparing a terrorist attack. The police said the arrest followed a report of three suspicious vehicles travelling towards the base. A major incident was declared and about 85 households were evacuated while British Army bomb disposal specialists examined the vehicles. The next day, the head of Counter Terrorism Policing announced that the five suspects had all been released on bail The Times reported that no explosives had been found, and The Guardian reported that the materials found inside the vans were not viable explosives. The Wall Street Journal reported that the possible involvement of the Islamic Revolutionary Guard Corps (IRGC) was an active line of investigation.

While he didn't name Iran as the perpetrators, saying he has to be "careful" about what he says, US Secretary of State Marco Rubio did state on Fox News that the incident "clearly involves the hand of a foreign actor". On the 30th September, Prime Minister Andy Burnham told BBC News that "There are strong indications that Iran played a part in what happened over the weekend at RAF Fairford", earlier in the week Iran's embassy in ‌London rejected what it described as "unfounded and malicious speculations" linking Tehran to the incident.

RAF Fairford is a Royal Air Force station that hosts United States Air Force units, including heavy bombers. During the 2026 Iran war, the base was used by the US Forces for operations against Iran, with the UK government granting permission in March 2026 for strikes on Iranian missile sites.

== Domestic political response ==
=== Political Parties ===
==== Conservatives ====
After the outbreak of war, Kemi Badenoch, leader of the opposition Conservative Party, said, "I stand with our allies in the US and Israel as they take on the threat of the Islamic Republic of Iran and its vile regime". Badenoch criticized Starmer's rationale for not immediately granting US access to UK bases, saying: "We are told that this dither and delay is because of concerns over international law. But I'm afraid that explanation simply does not hold. International law didn't prevent our allies from clearly and unequivocally stating whose side they were on." She added that "It took Iranian missiles hitting allies in the Gulf" for the Starmer government to take action.

==== Liberal Democrats ====
Ed Davey, leader of the Liberal Democrats, initially stated that Iranians "deserve to live free from a brutal regime", but that "unilateral and illegal military action won't deliver freedom, peace and security", warning that the UK "can't be dragged into another protracted Middle Eastern war by a US president". Later, Davey praised Starmer for doing "a better job than I expected" on distancing himself from Trump, though cautioned that "there is a slippery slope from defensive to offensive action" and British involvement in the Middle East "could soon get out of control".

==== Reform UK ====
On 28 February, before Starmer granted Trump's request to use UK bases, Nigel Farage, leader of Reform UK, wrote on social media that "the Prime Minister needs to change his mind on the use of our military bases and back the Americans in this vital fight against Iran!" Farage said that he prayed "for the right outcome for the wonderful Persian people" as "attacks against this evil regime in Iran begin". On 2 March, Farage said that Starmer's slow decision-making risked the UK–US "Special Relationship" and posed "a major threat to NATO".

==== Greens ====
After reports of mass casualties after an airstrike at a girls' school in Iran, Zack Polanski, leader of the Green Party, said: "This is an illegal, unprovoked and brutal attack that shows once again that the USA and Israel are rogue states." He called for the UK to "end our cosy relationship with the USA and our ongoing support for Israel."

=== Public Opinion ===
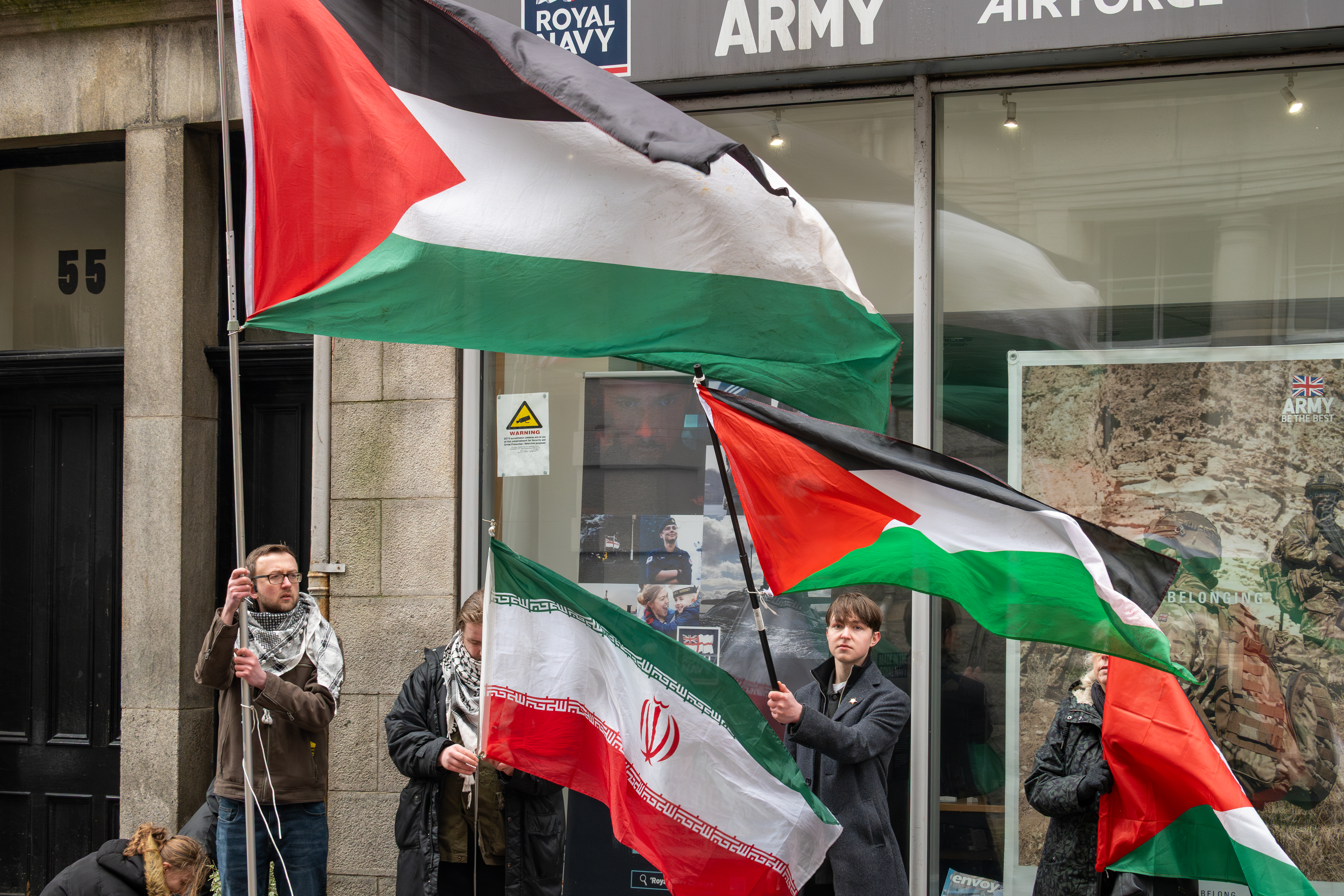
Protest against the US-Israeli strikes on Iran outside a Royal Air Force recruitment station in Aberdeen on the 1st March 2026.

==== Polling ====
A YouGov opinion poll of 4,132 GB adults on 2 March found that Britons opposed to the US-Israeli attacks by 49% against to 28% in favour, strengthening by 9 March with 12,002 GB adults to 59% against to 25% in favour with 75% thinking it would negatively impact them financially. An Opinium poll of 2,050 UK adults between 4 and 6 March found that 45% opposed the US-Israeli military action, while 22% supported it.

==== Protests ====
Since the strikes, a series of protests in support of the Iranian opposition have been held, primarily organized by Iranians in the United Kingdom. The UK government banned a protest in London organized by an Iran-linked group, with home secretary Shabana Mahmood citing the prevention of "serious public disorder" due to the scale of the protest. There have also been protests against the U.S and Israeli strikes, such as ones organized by the Stop the War Coalition.

== See also ==
- United Kingdom and the Gaza war
- Canada in the 2026 Iran war
- List of country-specific articles on the 2026 Iran war
