= Natural History Museum of Isfahan =

Museum in Isfahan, Iran

Natural History Museum
- موزه تاریخ طبیعی
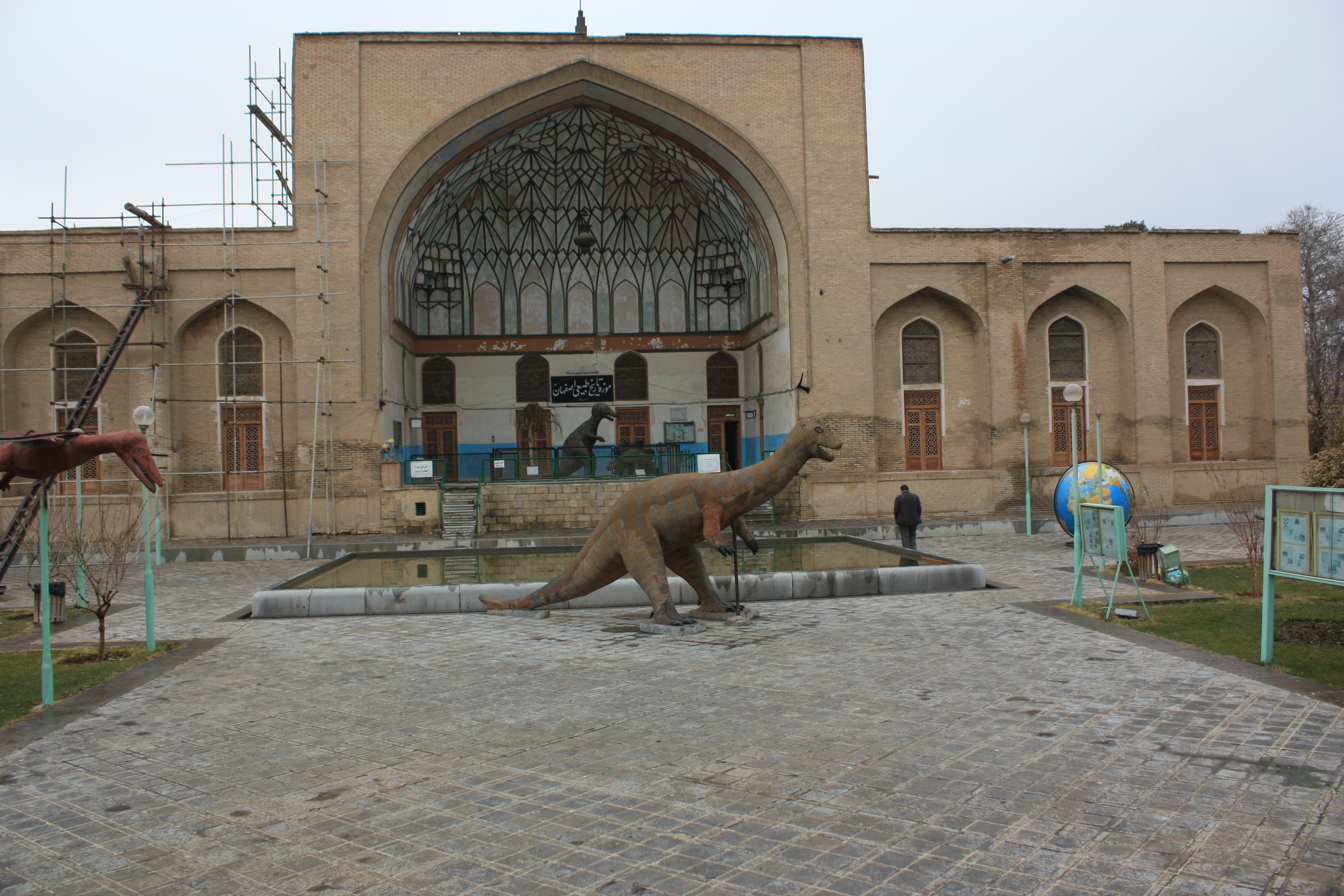

- Location within Iran

General information
- Status: Cultural
- Type: Museum
- Architectural style: Azeri
- Location: Isfahan, Iran
- Coordinates: 32.6580°N 51.6741°E
- Owner: Cultural Heritage, Handcrafts and Tourism Organization

The Natural History Museum of Isfahan, Iran, is located in a building that dates from the 15th century Timurid era. The building includes large halls and a veranda which are decorated by muqarnas and stucco. This building became a museum in 1988.

== Halls ==
The museum has seven halls:

- Guidance hall
- Invertebrates hall, containing: Unicellular organisms, sponges, corals, echinoderms, mollusca, arthropods, insects, and seashells.
- Botany hall has flowering plants, whole plants, medicinal plants, and tree trunks.
- Geology hall contains constituents of the earth's solid crust.
- Hall of physical geography
- Vertebrates hall contains different kinds of fish, amphibians, reptiles, birds, and mammals, which are kept as taxidermy specimens.
- Hall of Graphic training aids

== Architecture ==
This building has several large halls and a porch decorated with Muqarnas and stucco. There are plastic dinosaurs in front of the building which some may regard as incongruous with the building's architecture.

== Gallery ==
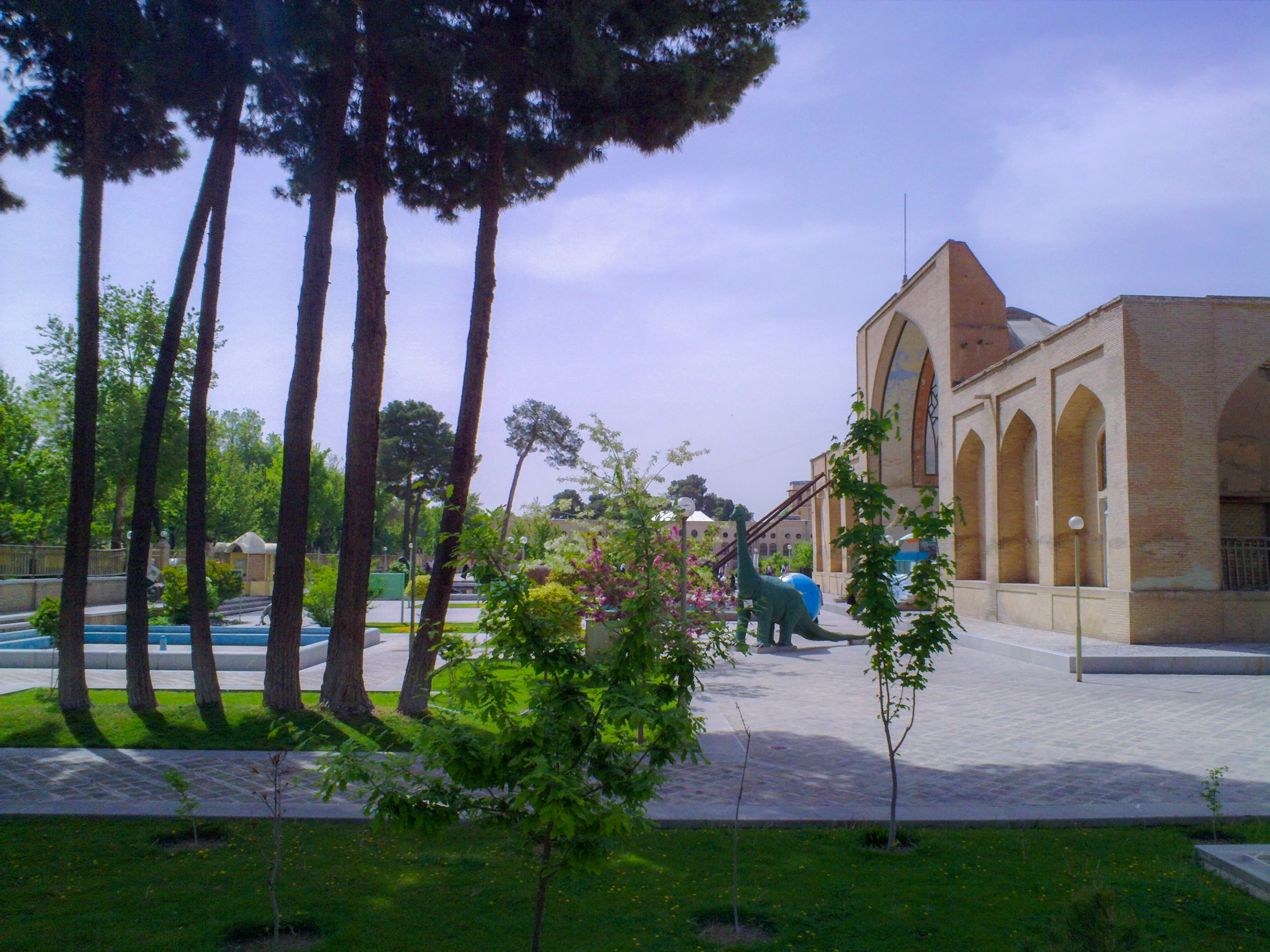
Museum of Natural history

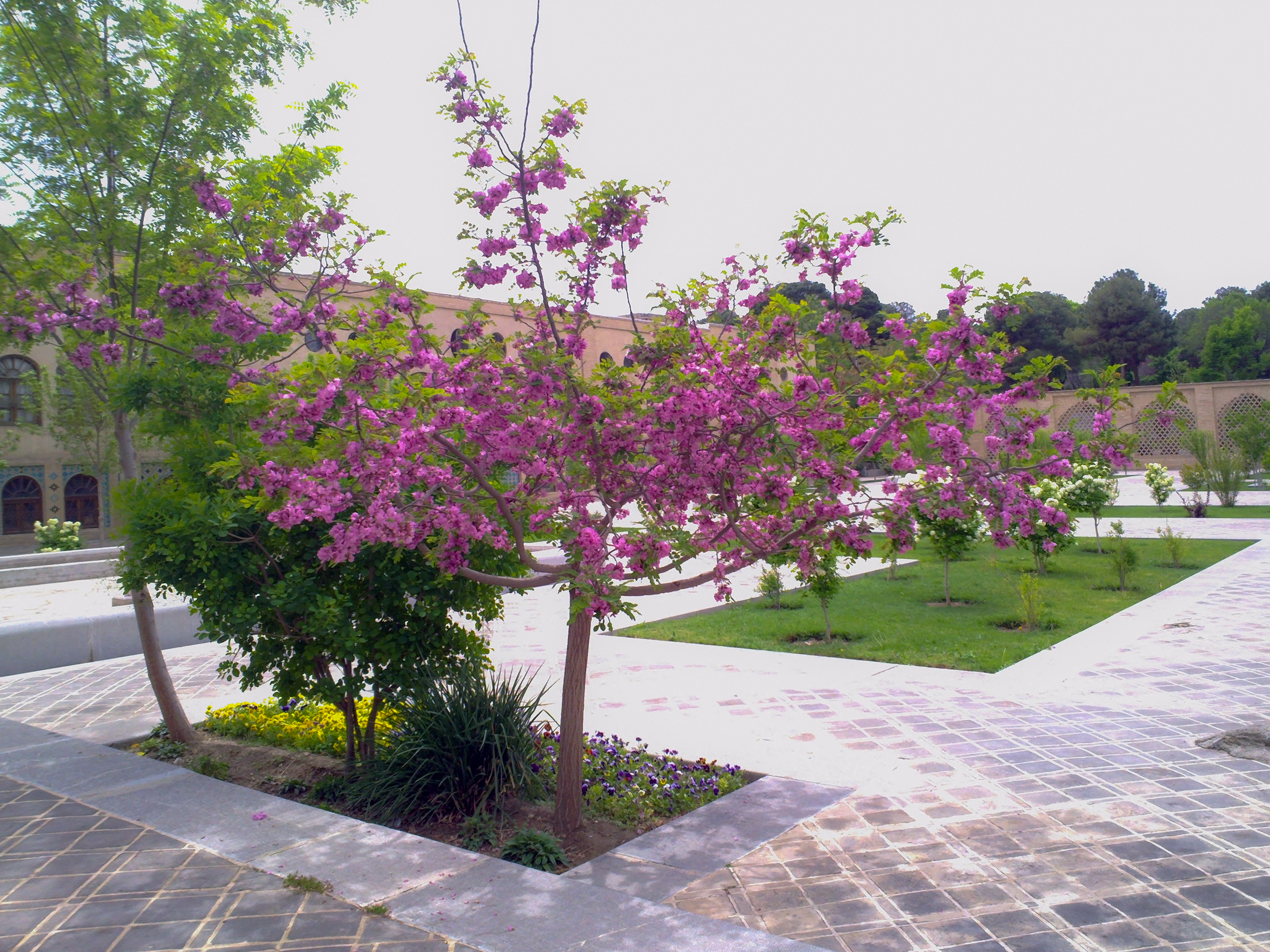
Museum of Natural history

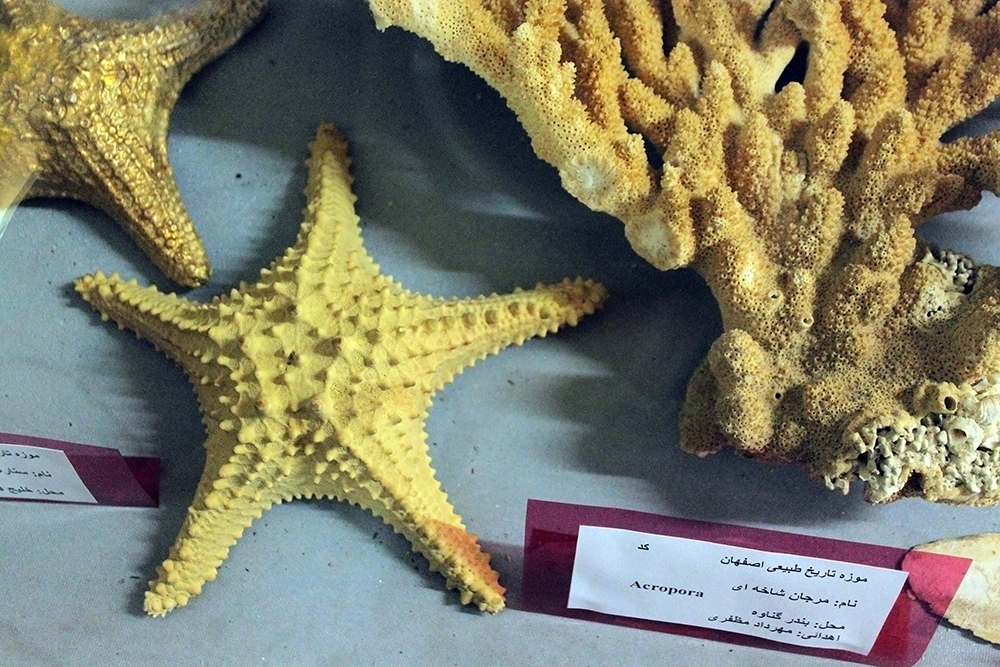

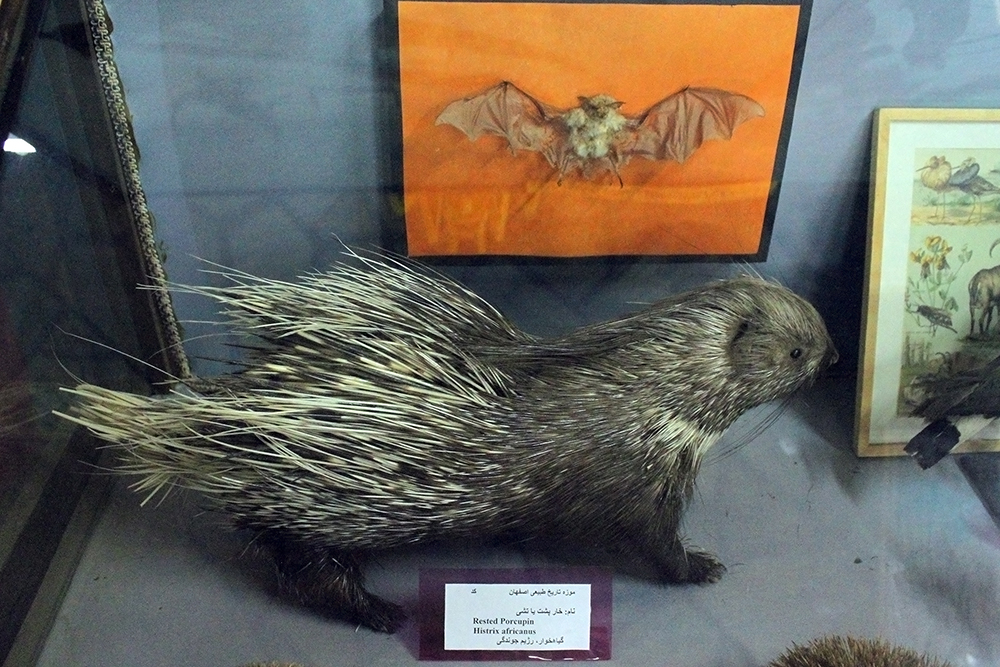

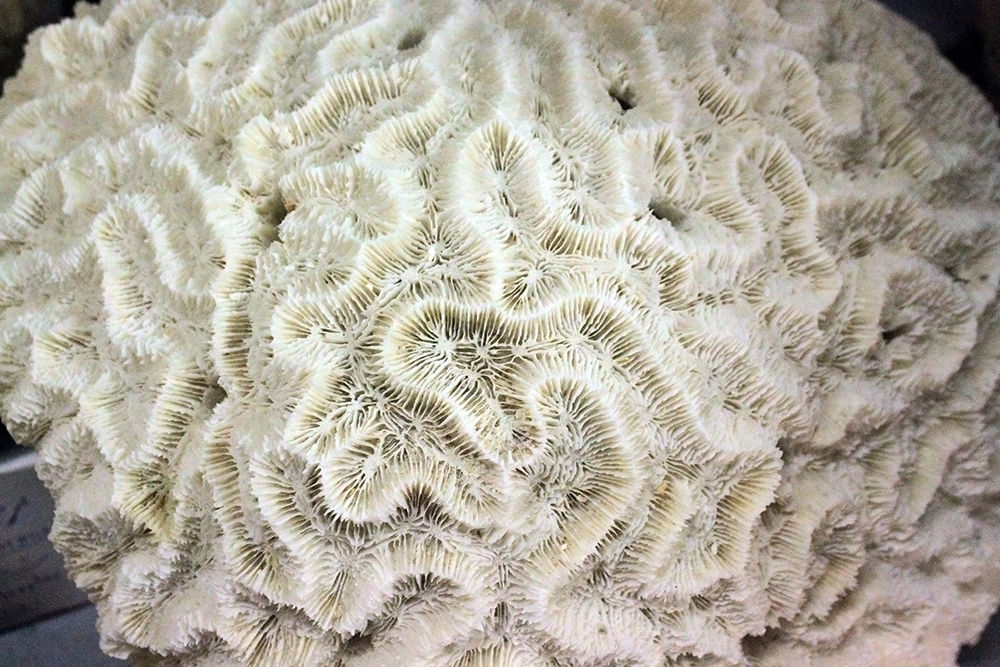

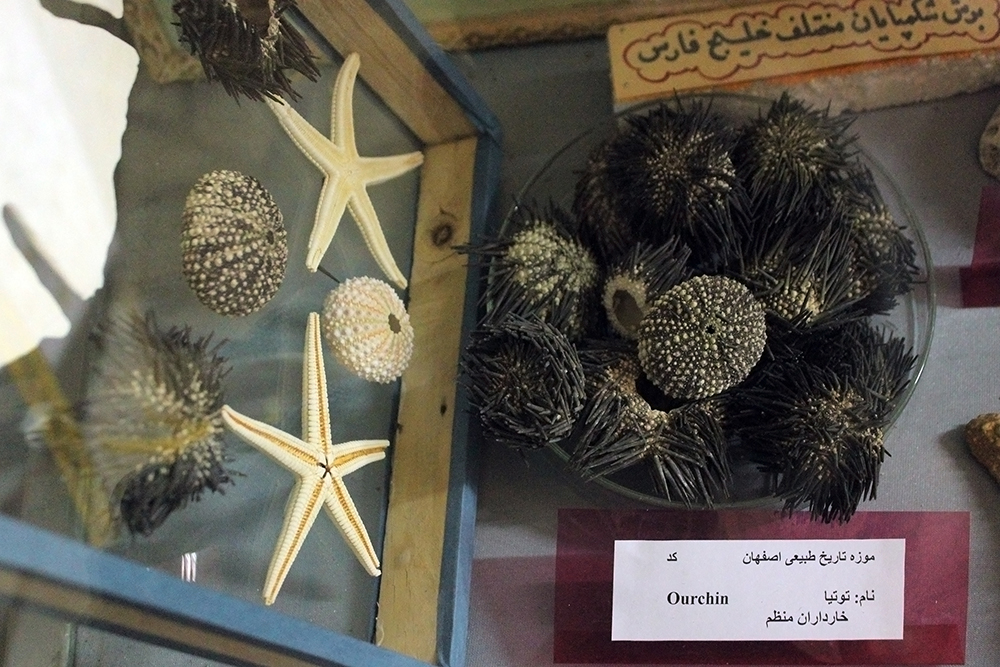

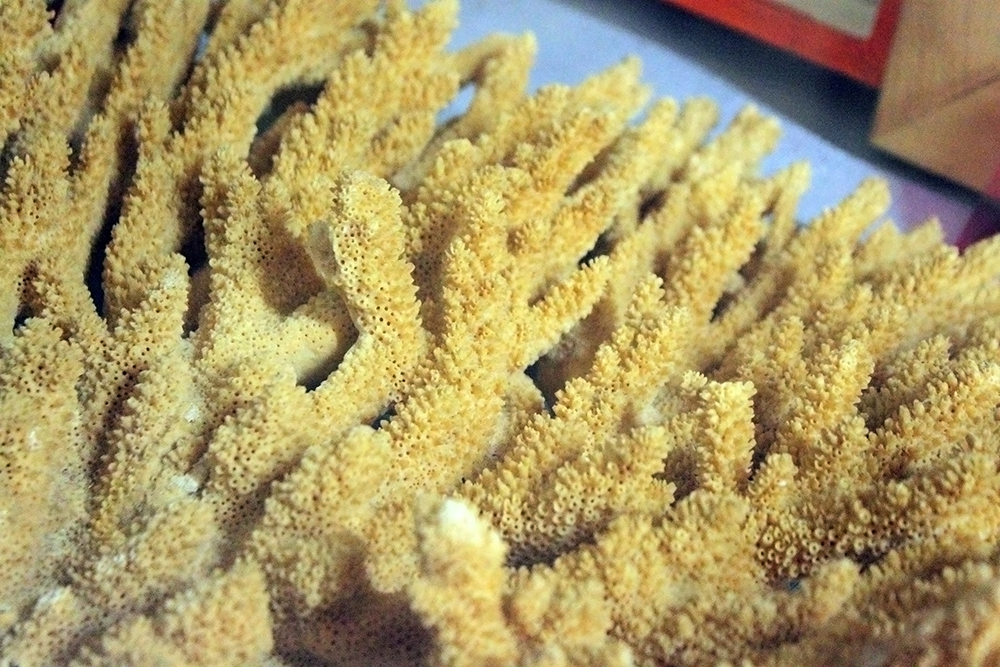

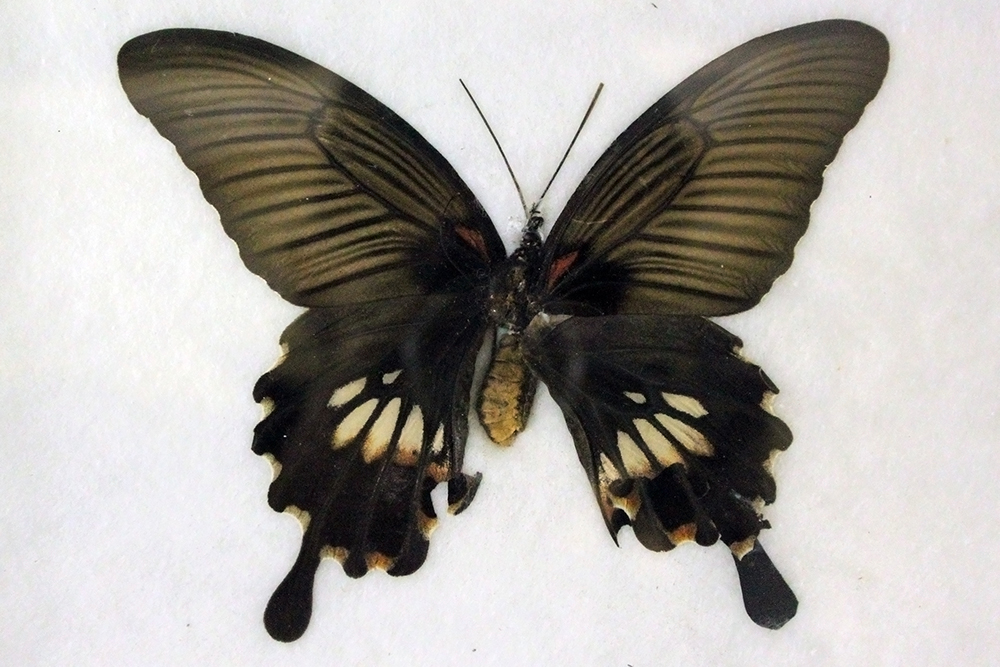

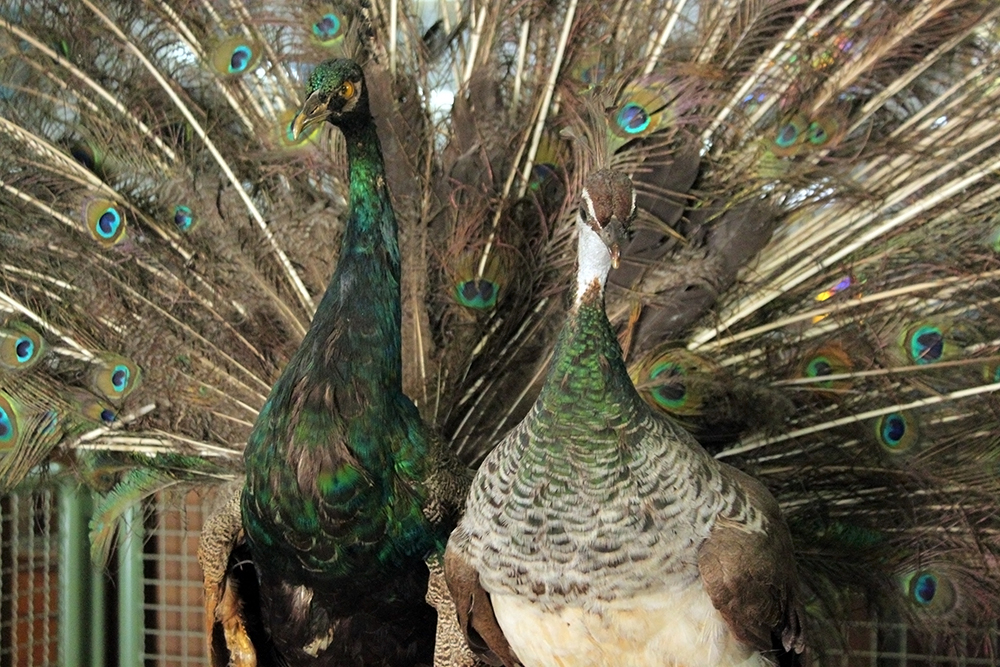

== See also ==
- Ministry of Cultural Heritage, Handicrafts and Tourism
- Iran National Heritage List
- List of historical structures in Isfahan Province
