= Evacuations during the 2026 Iran war =

During the 2026 Iran war, a series of evacuations took place across Iran and the broader Middle East, involving civilians, foreign nationals, military personnel, and diplomatic staff. These evacuations were prompted by joint United States and Israeli airstrikes on Iran beginning 28 February 2026, which led to retaliatory Iranian missile and drone attacks on U.S. bases and allied nations in the region. The conflict disrupted air travel, closed airspace in multiple countries, and created widespread security risks, stranding hundreds of thousands and necessitating government-organized repatriations.

== Background ==
The 2026 Iran war started on 28 February 2026, with coordinated U.S. and Israeli strikes targeting Iranian nuclear facilities, military leadership, and infrastructure, including the assassination of Supreme Leader Ali Khamenei. Iran retaliated with ballistic missiles and drones aimed at Israel, U.S. military installations in the Persian Gulf, and civilian sites in allied states, causing widespread disruption.

Prior to the strikes, the U.S. Pentagon had quietly evacuated several bases in the Middle East, citing their proximity to Iranian short-range missiles as untenable. Foreign embassies issued travel advisories as early as 23 February, urging citizens to depart Iran amid rising tensions.

== Evacuations within Iran ==
Collateral damage from strikes prompted localized evacuations in Iran. In Bushehr, infants from a damaged hospital's neonatal unit were transferred by ambulance to safer facilities. Tehran's Gandhi Hospital was cleared after nearby explosions, with the World Health Organization verifying the move and investigating hits on three other medical centers.

On March 2, 2026, the Israeli military issued evacuation warnings for residents in Tehran's Evin district, particularly areas near the headquarters of Iran's state broadcaster, IRIB, ahead of planned strikes on what it described as regime military infrastructure. The following day, similar orders were extended to several other parts of the city, including the Tehran Industrial Area and Payam International Airport, as part of preparations for imminent operations against Iranian targets. These directives were part of a pattern of warnings issued by the Israel Defense Forces (IDF) to Iranian civilians near military and government sites.

== Evacuations of foreign nationals ==
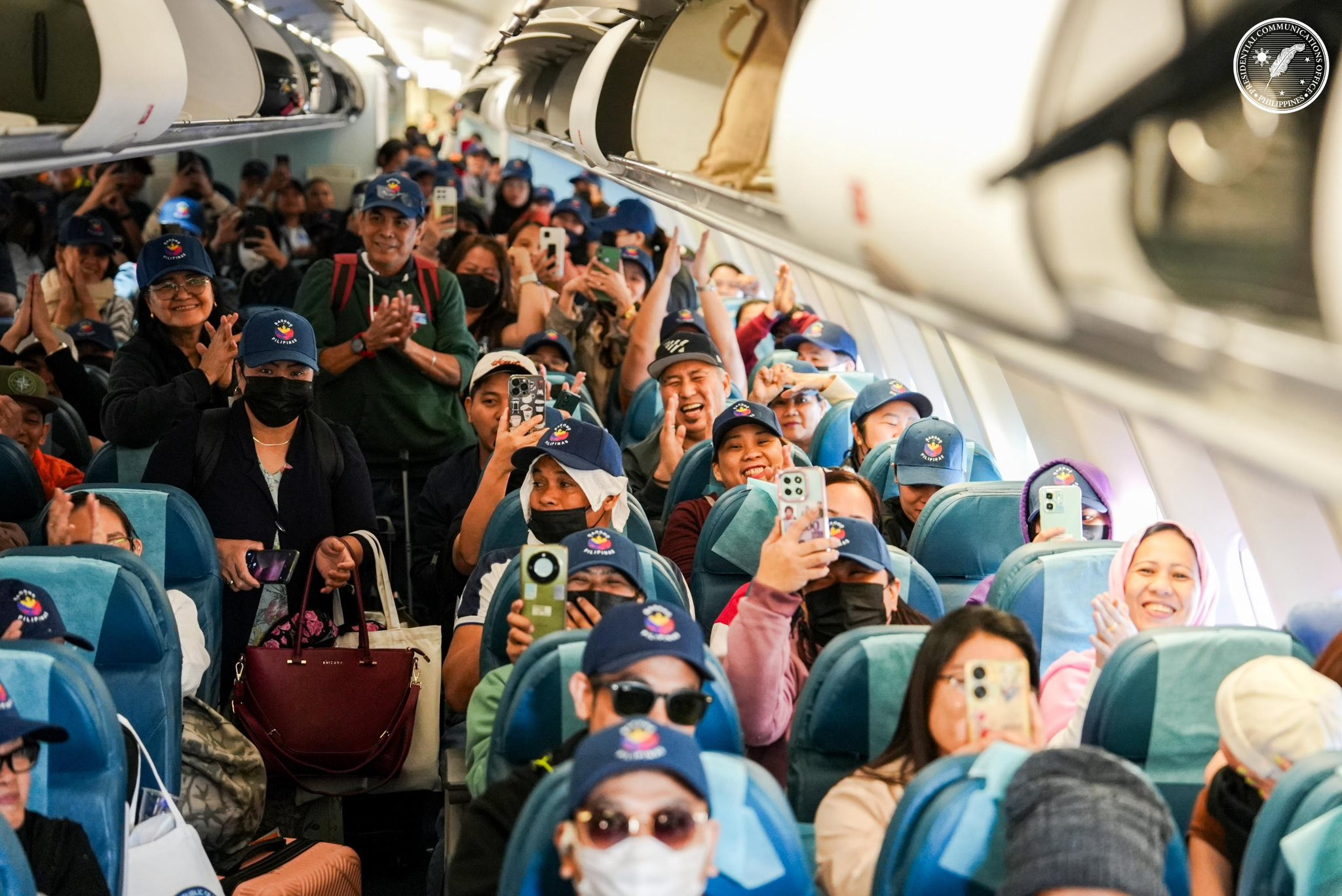
Filipino migrant workers from the Middle East on a repatriation flight to the Philippines following the Iran war

Numerous countries organized repatriations for citizens stranded by airspace closures and strikes. The U.S. State Department urged immediate departure from 14 countries, including Bahrain, Egypt, Iran, Iraq, Israel, Jordan, Kuwait, Lebanon, Oman, Qatar, Saudi Arabia, Syria, the UAE, and Yemen, citing severe safety risks. It facilitated charter flights from the UAE, Saudi Arabia, and Jordan, contacting nearly 3,000 Americans.

The UK, Spain, Italy, and Germany chartered flights, with Germany estimating 30,000 citizens stranded and Italy reporting 58,000 stuck in the region. France noted 400,000 nationals in the Middle East requiring potential assistance. Over 200 people from 16 countries exited Iran via Turkmenistan.

In Asia, Indian student associations demanded relocation for about 1,200 MBBS students in Iran, particularly after strikes near Urmia University dormitories. Japan prepared Self-Defense Forces for expat extractions. Armenia and Azerbaijan received around 1,500 evacuees via land borders, including 300 Iranians in Armenia and diverse nationals like Chinese and Russians in Azerbaijan. Over 300 fled Iran through Azerbaijan alone, representing 19 nationalities.

Other countries have evacuated own nationals. Lesotho coordinated the rescue of one of its citizens from Kuwait while Andorra remained in contact with more than 30 Andorran citizens stranded in the UAE and Qatar to secure their safe return.

Pakistan evacuated over 650 of its nationals from Iran in the initial days of the conflict, with many crossing into Azerbaijan via the Astara land border as an alternative route amid disruptions at other crossings.

== Military and diplomatic evacuations ==
The U.S. ordered non-emergency personnel and families to leave diplomatic posts in the UAE, Qatar, Kuwait, Bahrain, Iraq, and Jordan, closing several missions amid threats. The U.S. Embassy in Jordan was temporarily evacuated due to an unspecified security threat. Qatar evacuated residents near its U.S. Embassy in Doha as a precaution. By early April, hundreds of US military personnel had been repatriated from bases in Bahrain and other countries in the region after Iranian missile and drone attacks, prompting urgent community efforts to support the evacuees.

== Impact ==
The evacuations strained global travel, with over 20,000 flights canceled and major hubs like Dubai paralyzed. Stranded individuals faced mayhem, improvising overland routes to open airports in Saudi Arabia or Oman. The war's spread to Lebanon prompted Israeli-ordered evacuations in over 80 southern villages.

== See also ==
- 2026 Iran war
- Reactions to the 2026 Iran war
- 2026 Strait of Hormuz crisis
