= United Nations Security Council Resolution 2817 =

UN Security Council Resolution 2817
- Co-sponsors of the United Nations Security Council Resolution 2817
- Date: 11 March 2026
- Meeting no.: 10,119
- Code: S/RES/2817 (Document)
- Subject: 2026 Iran war
- Voting summary: 13 voted for; None voted against; 2 abstained
- Result: Adopted

Security Council composition
- Permanent members: China; France; Russia; United Kingdom; United States
- Non-permanent members: Bahrain; Colombia; DR Congo; Denmark; Greece; Latvia; Liberia; Pakistan; Panama; Somalia

United Nations Security Council Resolution 2817 was adopted on March 11, 2026, condemning Iran's "egregious attacks" against the Arab states of the Persian Gulf and Jordan during the 2026 Iran war.

The resolution adopted by the United Nations Security Council reaffirms its firm support "for the territorial integrity, sovereignty, and political independence of Bahrain, Kuwait, Oman, Qatar, Saudi Arabia, the United Arab Emirates, and Jordan," and condemns the "deliberate targeting of civilians and civilian objects." The resolution calls on Iran to fully comply with its obligations under international law. It also condemns Iran's attacks on ships and any action or threat aimed at closing, obstructing, or otherwise interfering with international navigation through the Strait of Hormuz, or threatening maritime security in the Strait of Bab al-Mandab; as already required by the United Nations Convention on the Law of the Sea.

The resolution was sponsored by Bahrain and received approval from 13 members. It was cosponsored by 135 countries, the largest number of supporters for any Security Council resolution in history. China and Russia abstained from voting, with both countries criticizing the text's lack of any reference to the United States and Israeli strikes on Iran that triggered the conflict on February 28, 2026.

== Voting ==
Approved (13)	Abstained (2)	Opposed (0)
Bahrain; Colombia; DR Congo; Denmark; **France**; Greece; Latvia; Liberia; Pakistan; Panama; Somalia; **United Kingdom**; **United States**	**China**; **Russia**	

- Permanent members of the Security Council are in bold.

== Contents ==
UN Security Council Resolution 2817

**Resolution 2817 (2026)**

**Adopted by the Security Council at its 10119th meeting, on 11 March 2026**

The Security Council,

Having considered the letter dated 28 February 2026 from the representative of Bahrain, submitted on behalf of the Member States of the Cooperation Council for the Arab States of the Gulf (GCC), Kuwait, Oman, Qatar, Saudi Arabia and the United Arab Emirates, concerning the missile and unmanned aerial vehicle attacks by the Islamic Republic of Iran against their territories,

Reiterating its strong support for the territorial integrity, sovereignty and political independence of Bahrain, Kuwait, Oman, Qatar, Saudi Arabia, the United Arab Emirates, and Jordan,

Recalling its primary responsibility under the Charter of the United Nations for the maintenance of international peace and security,

Noting all relevant Security Council resolutions regarding the Islamic Republic of Iran,

Recalling Resolution 552 (1984), which takes into consideration the importance of the Gulf region to international peace and security and its vital role to the stability of the world economy, and reaffirms the right of navigation for shipping en route to and from all ports and installations of the littoral States that are not parties to the hostilities,

Affirming the inherent right of individual or collective self-defense in response to the deplorable armed attacks by the Islamic Republic of Iran, as recognized by Article 51 of the United Nations Charter,

Deploring the deliberate targeting of civilians and civilian objects by the Islamic Republic of Iran, including airports, energy installations, objects necessary for food production and distribution, and critical civilian infrastructure, as well as the indiscriminate use of weapons in populated areas and their consequences for the civilian population, as well as attacks and threats on merchant and commercial vessels in and near the Strait of Hormuz and at the disruption of maritime security and the adverse impact on international trade, energy security and global economy resulting from destabilizing activities and regional tensions in violation of international law,

Further noting the strenuous efforts made by the Gulf Cooperation Council countries, and other countries in the region by engaging in mediation efforts to facilitate dialogue between the Islamic Republic of Iran and the international community and to address differences and settle disputes by peaceful means to spare the region the dangers of escalation,

Affirming its full commitment to promoting the maintenance of peace and stability in the Middle East,

1. Reiterates its strong support for the territorial integrity, sovereignty and political independence of Bahrain, Kuwait, Oman, Qatar, Saudi Arabia, the United Arab Emirates, and Jordan;
2. Condemns in the strongest terms the egregious attacks by the Islamic Republic of Iran against the territories of Bahrain, Kuwait, Oman, Qatar, Saudi Arabia, the United Arab Emirates and Jordan and determines that such acts constitute a breach of international law and a serious threat to international peace and security;
3. Further condemns that residential areas were attacked, that civilian objects have been targeted and that the attacks resulted in civilian casualties and damage of civilian buildings; and expresses solidarity with these countries and their people;
4. Demands the immediate cessation of all attacks by the Islamic Republic of Iran against Bahrain, Kuwait, Oman, Qatar, Saudi Arabia, the United Arab Emirates, and Jordan;
5. Demands that the Islamic Republic of Iran immediately and unconditionally cease from any provocation or threats to neighboring States, including the use of proxies;
6. Calls upon the Islamic Republic of Iran to comply fully with its obligations under international law, including international humanitarian law, particularly regarding the protection of civilians and civilian objects in armed conflict;
7. Reaffirms the exercise of navigational rights and freedoms by merchant and commercial vessels, in accordance with international law, must be respected, particularly around critical maritime routes, and takes note of the right of Member States, in accordance with international law, to defend their vessels from attacks and provocations, including those that undermine navigational rights and freedoms;
8. Condemns any actions or threats by the Islamic Republic of Iran aimed at closing, obstructing, or otherwise interfering with international navigation through the Strait of Hormuz, or threatening maritime security in the Bab Al Mandab; affirms that any attempt to impede lawful transit passage or freedom of navigation in these international waterways constitutes a serious threat to international peace and security; and calls upon Iran to refrain immediately from any actions or threats in accordance with international law;
9. Decides to remain actively seized of the matter.

== See also ==
- List of United Nations Security Council Resolutions 2801 to 2900 (2025–present)
