= Aftermath of the Iran nuclear deal =

Joint Comprehensive Plan of Action
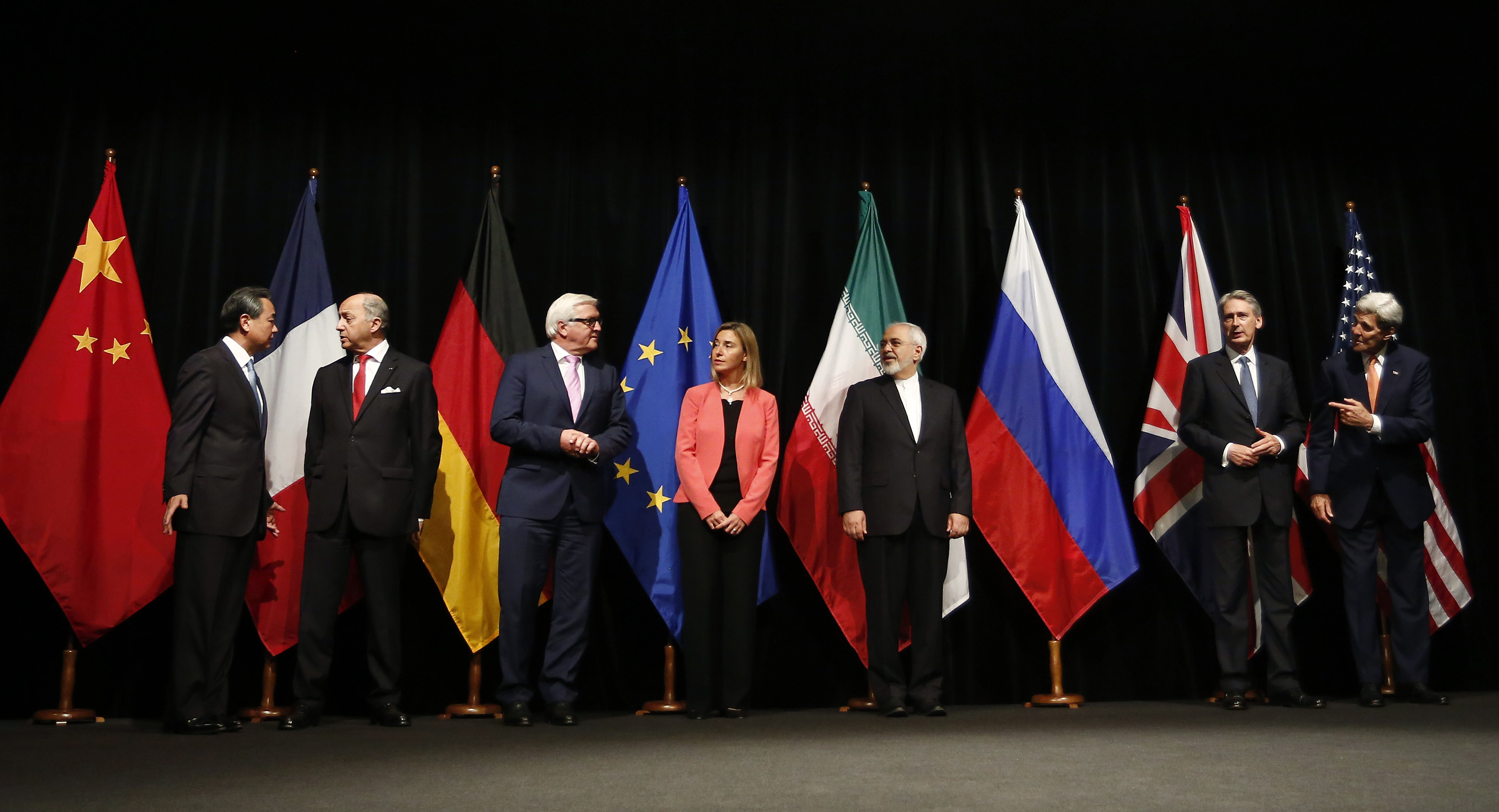
- Officials announcing the agreement
- Created: 14 July 2015
- Ratified: N/A (ratification not required)
- Date effective: 18 October 2015 (adoption); 16 January 2016 (implementation)
- Location: Vienna, Austria
- Signatories: China; France; Germany; European Union; Iran; Russia; United Kingdom; United States (withdrew)
- Purpose: Nuclear non-proliferation

The Joint Comprehensive Plan of Action (JCPOA; Persian: برنامه جامع اقدام مشترک, romanized: barnāmeye jāme'e eqdāme moshtarak, acronym: برجام BARJAM), commonly known as the Iran nuclear deal or Iran deal, is an agreement on the Iranian nuclear program reached in Vienna on 14 July 2015 between Iran, the P5+1 (the five permanent members of the United Nations Security Council—China, France, Russia, United Kingdom, United States—plus Germany), (Note: The P5+1 are also sometimes referred to as the "E3+3", for the "EU three" countries (France, the UK, and Germany) plus the three non-EU countries (the U.S., Russia, and China). The terms are interchangeable; this article uses the "P5+1" phrase.) and the European Union.

In February 2019 the International Atomic Energy Agency certified that Iran was still abiding by the deal. In May 2019 the IAEA certified that Iran was abiding by the main terms of the deal, though questions were raised about how many advanced centrifuges Iran was allowed to have, as that was only loosely defined in the deal.

== Impact ==
=== Economic ===
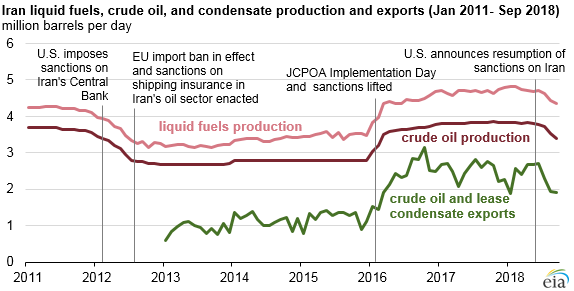
Changes in Iranian oil production in response to sanctions and the JCPOA, 2011–2018

With the prospective lifting of some sanctions, the agreement was expected to have a significant impact on both the economy of Iran and global markets. The energy sector is particularly important, with Iran having nearly 10 percent of global oil reserves and 18 percent of natural gas reserves. Millions of barrels of Iranian oil might come onto global markets, lowering the price of crude oil. However, the impact would not be immediate, because Iran would not be able to implement measures that are needed to lift sanctions until the end of 2015. Technology and investment from global integrated oil companies were expected to increase capacity from Iran's oil fields and refineries, which have been in "disarray" in recent years, plagued by mismanagement and underinvestment. Senior executives from oil giants Royal Dutch Shell, TotalEnergies, and Eni met with the Iranian oil minister in Vienna in June, the month before the JCPOA was announced, and sought business opportunities in Iran.

The economic impact of a partial lifting of sanctions extends beyond the energy sector; The New York Times reported that "consumer-oriented companies, in particular, could find opportunity in this country with 81 million consumers," many of whom are young and prefer Western products. Iran is "considered a strong emerging market play" by investment and trading firms.

French auto manufacturer PSA Peugeot Citroën was one of the first Western companies to re-establish commercial ties following the deal.

In February 2016, after the end of a four-year restriction, Iranian banks—except Mehr, Ansar and Saderat banks— reconnected to the SWIFT. But many Iranian observers, including critics of Rouhani's administration, economists and private sector representatives, claimed the news was false. According to Financial Times's report, Iran's banks are indeed being reconnected to SWIFT but there have been "too few" transactions because European and US banks are "worried about the risks" of dealing with them and "scarred by a string of multibillion-dollar fines".

Three months after implementation, Iran was unable to tap about $100 billion held abroad. On 15 April 2016 Central Bank of Iran Governor Valiollah Seif said in an interview with Bloomberg Television that Iran had gotten "almost nothing" from the accord. He also met Secretary of Treasury Jack Lew during his Washington trip to discuss the concerns. White House Press Secretary Josh Earnest said, "the agreement that's included in the JCPOA does not include giving Iran access to the US financial system or to allow the execution of so-called U-turn transactions."

On 20 April 2016 the Supreme Court of the United States decided in Bank Markazi v. Peterson that almost $2 billion of Iranian frozen assets must be given to families of people killed in the 1983 Beirut barracks bombings. The court held Iran responsible for the incident. Iranian foreign minister Zarif called the ruling "highway robbery", excoriating the court for a previous ruling holding Iran responsible for 9/11 and adding that it is "the Supreme Court of the United States, not the Supreme Court of the world. We're not under its jurisdiction, nor is our money."

On 27 November 2016 Schlumberger, the world's largest oil service company, announced that it had signed a preliminary deal to study an Iranian oil field. According to Schlumberger's spokesperson, this was a memorandum of understanding with the state-run National Iranian Oil Company "for the non-disclosure of data required for a technical evaluation of a field development prospect".

=== Scientific ===
In July 2015 Richard Stone wrote in the journal Science that if the agreement was fully implemented, "Iran can expect a rapid expansion of scientific cooperation with Western powers. As its nuclear facilities are repurposed, scientists from Iran and abroad will team up in areas such as nuclear fusion, astrophysics, and radioisotopes for cancer therapy."

=== Diplomatic ===
In August 2015 the British embassy in Tehran reopened almost four years after it was closed after protesters attacked the embassy in 2011. At a reopening ceremony, Hammond said that since Rouhani's election as president, British-Iranian relations had gone from a "low point" to steady "step-by-step" improvement. Hammond said: "Last month's historic nuclear agreement was another milestone, and showed the power of diplomacy, conducted in an atmosphere of mutual respect, to solve shared challenges. Re-opening the embassy is the logical next step to build confidence and trust between two great nations." BBC diplomatic correspondent Jonathan Marcus reported that the nuclear agreement "had clearly been decisive in prompting the UK embassy to be reopened", stating that British-Iranian "ties have slowly been warming but it is clearly the successful conclusion of the nuclear accord with Iran that has paved the way for the embassy reopening".

In May 2018 The Observer reported that the White House had hired an Israeli intelligence firm in May 2017 to search for unsavory information on Obama administration officials Ben Rhodes and Colin Kahl. Former UK Foreign Secretary Jack Straw said that these efforts by Trump and Netanyahu appear to have been intended "not so much to discredit the [Iran] deal but to undermine those around it."

== Continued tensions ==
After the adoption of the JCPOA, the United States imposed several new non-nuclear sanctions against Iran, some of which were condemned by Iran as possible violations of the deal. According to Seyed Mohammad Marandi, professor at the University of Tehran, the general consensus in Iran while the negotiations were taking place was that the United States would move towards increasing sanctions on non-nuclear areas. He said that these post-JCPOA sanctions could "severely damage the chances for the Joint Comprehensive Plan of Action bearing fruit".

On 8 and 9 March 2016 the IRGC conducted ballistic missile tests as part of its military drills, with one of the Qadr H missiles carrying the inscription, "Israel should be wiped off the Earth." Israel called on Western powers to punish Iran for the tests, which U.S. officials said did not violate the nuclear deal but might violate United Nations Security Council Resolution 2231. Iranian Foreign Minister Mohammad Javad Zarif insisted that the tests were not in violation of the UNSC resolution. On 17 March the U.S. Treasury Department sanctioned Iranian and British companies for involvement in the Iranian ballistic missile program.

On 21 May 2016 Zarif, during a meeting with his New Zealander counterpart Murray McCully, insisted that the "U.S. must take practical steps".

== Iran–U.S. prisoner exchange ==
Hours before the official announcement of the activation of JCPOA on 16 January 2016, Iran released four imprisoned Iranian Americans—Washington Post reporter Jason Rezaian, who had been convicted of espionage, former Marine Corps infantryman Amir Hekmati, who had been convicted of co-operating with hostile governments, Christian pastor Saeed Abedini, who was convicted on national security charges, and former Iranian infantryman Nosratollah Khosravi-Roodsari, who was convicted of violating alcohol prohibitions and awaiting trial on espionage charges—in exchange for the United States' release of seven Iranian Americans—Bahram Mechanic, Khosrow Afghahi and Tooraj Faridi, charged with sanctions violations, Nader Modanlo, convicted of helping launch Iranian satellite Sina-1, Arash Ghahreman, convicted of money laundering and sanctions violations for exporting navigation equipment to Iran, Nima Golestaneh, convicted of hacking, and Ali Saboonchi, convicted of sanctions violations—and the dismissal of outstanding charges against 14 Iranians outside the United States. A fifth American, student and researcher Matthew Trevithick, left Iran in a separate arrangement.

As part of the exchange, the U.S. government dropped charges and Interpol red notices against "14 Iranians for whom it was assessed that extradition requests were unlikely to be successful." Senior U.S. officials defended the agreement as a good deal for the U.S., but some Justice Department officials and FBI and DHS agents were critical because this disrupted the National Counterproliferation Initiative efforts "to lure top Iranian targets into traveling internationally in order to arrest them". The Obama administration also paid $400 million in euros, Swiss francs and other foreign currencies on 17 January 2016, the same day Iran released four American prisoners, as the first installment of a $1.7 billion settlement.

== Continued criticism ==
Shahi Hamid of The Atlantic wrote that the agreement "had a narrow—if understandable—focus on the minutia of Iran's nuclear program", and "[t]he Obama administration repeatedly underscored that the negotiations weren't about Iran's other activities in the region: They were about the nuclear program." The U.S. government and observers noted from the time that the framework was entered into in April 2015 "that the United States and Iran still find themselves on opposite sides of most of the conflicts that have pitched the Arab world into chaos" and that the agreement was "unlikely" to cause Iran to become a firm partner of the West.

The narrow nuclear non-proliferation focus of the deal was criticized by the agreement's opponents (such as Lawrence J. Hass of the American Foreign Policy Council), who argued that the agreement was faulty because it did not address anti-Semitism and threats against Israel, hostility and rhetoric against America and the West in general, illegal missile testing, supplying of arms to terrorist groups, and efforts to destabilize ongoing conflicts in Syria and Yemen.

In October 2015 The Wall Street Journal noted that Iran had recently carried out ballistic missile tests, announced the conviction of Washington Post journalist Jason Rezaian, launched military operations to maintain Bashar al-Assad's administration in Syria, and continued shipping arms and money to Houthi rebels in Yemen, the latter two actions fueling fears of a broader regional war.

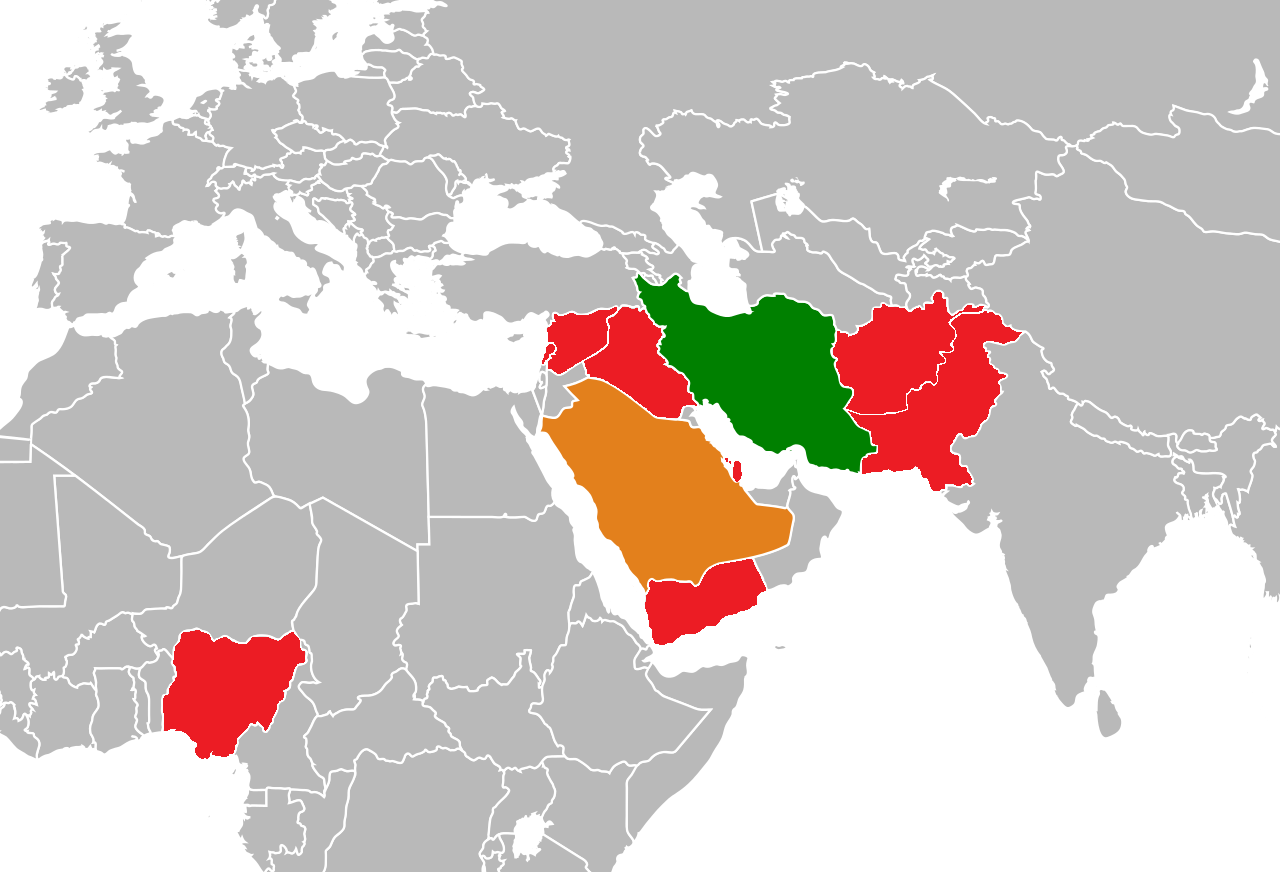
Major Iran–Saudi Arabia proxy conflict locations

Israel and Saudi Arabia expressed concern about Iran's ability to use diplomatic cover and unfrozen money from the deal to strengthen its regional position and that of its allies. Critics in Washington accused the Obama administration of having been duped by Iran and Russia into accepting a deal that was antithetical to American interests.

Meanwhile, the administration was also accused of whitewashing Iran's failure to cooperate fully with the IAEA investigation into the possible military dimensions of its past nuclear work.

In November 2015 The New York Times wrote, "[a]nyone who hoped that Iran's nuclear agreement with the United States and other powers portended a new era of openness with the West has been jolted with a series of increasingly rude awakenings over the past few weeks." The Times reported, variously, that the Iranian government had invited a Lebanese-American to visit the country, and then arrested him for spying; the Ayatollah made a public statement that the slogan "Death to America" was "eternal"; a wave of anti-American billboards went up in the capital; a backlash by political hard-liners began and the Revolutionary Guard intelligence apparatus "started rounding up journalists, activists and cultural figures"; state media circulated conspiracy theories about the United States, including that the CIA had downed a Russian civilian passenger jet in Egypt; Iranian and Lebanese citizens in Iran holding dual American citizenship were targeted for arrest on charges of "spying"; clothing manufacturers were prohibited from selling items featuring the American or British flags; and a state-sponsored demonstration was held outside the former U.S. embassy in Tehran on the anniversary of the takeover and hostage crisis in 1979.

Business Insider reported that a variety of factors made it more likely that Iran's stance would harden once the agreement was in place, with one Iran expert saying that Iran's "nice, smiling face" would now disappear as the country pursued more adversarial stances, and policy analysts saying that by negotiating the deal with the Iranian Revolutionary Guard Corps, Obama had "made an investment in the stability of the [IRGC] regime".

The National Review wrote that the U.S. administration's unwillingness to acknowledge any Iranian noncompliance had left the Iranians in control, and that the deal was undermining international security by emboldening Iran to act as a regional hegemon, at the expense of U.S. influence and credibility.

The Wall Street Journal editorial page editor Paul Gigot argued in February 2016 that Iran's prohibited missile tests, capture of U.S. naval personnel, and other provocations were a sign that rapprochement hoped for by Iran's Western negotiating partners was not going to happen, saying the government had no interest in accommodating U.S. interests, seeking instead to humiliate the United States and spread propaganda. Gigot noted Iran's desire to be the dominant power in the Mideast and would work to promote instability there while using the nuclear agreement as a "shield" to protect from criticism of its "imperialist" behavior.

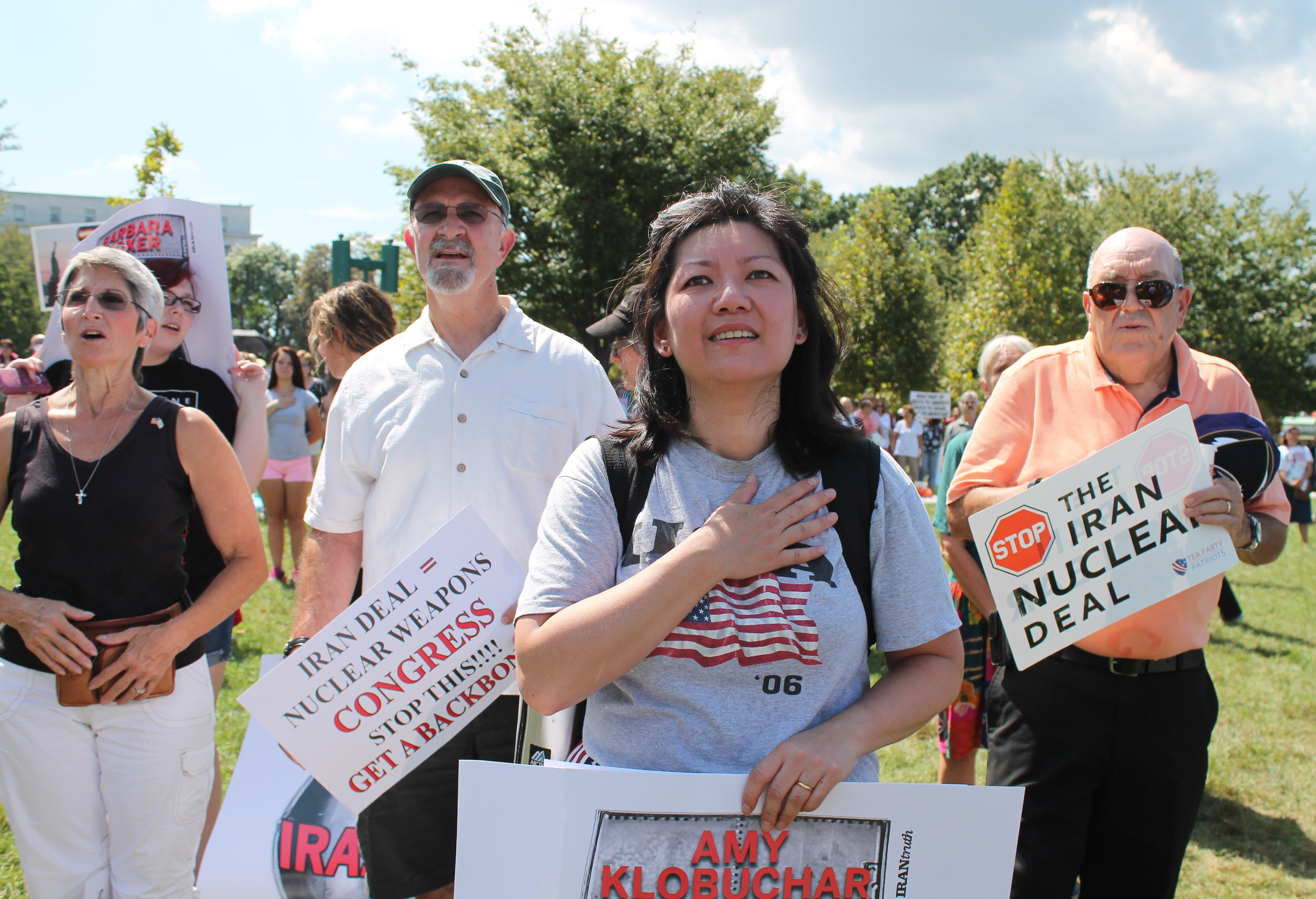
Protest against the Iran Nuclear deal in Washington, D.C., 9 September 2015

James S. Robbins, an American political commentator and a senior fellow on the American Foreign Policy Council, criticized the nuclear deal as "impotent" because it does not limit Iran's ballistic missile program, and UNSC Resolution 2231, which was adopted along with the deal, weakened the limits Iran's ballistic missile program that had been imposed by previous UNSC resolutions.

On 4 March 2016 Olli Heinonen, former Deputy Director General of the International Atomic Energy Agency, wrote, "the International Atomic Energy Agency's most recent report on Iran's nuclear activities provides insufficient details on important verification and monitoring issues," and said that the report's lack of detailed data prevented the international community from verifying whether Iran was complying with the deal.

On 20 March 2017 the Trump administration formally certified that Iran was in compliance with JCPOA, but added that the country will be subject to non-nuclear, terrorism related, sanctions. The Trump administration refused to recertify Iran's compliance in October 2017, however, citing multiple violations.

== Compliance ==
The IAEA, EU, Russia and China have all affirmed that Iran is adhering to the terms of the JCPOA. The IAEA has repeatedly deemed Iran in compliance with the deal. The U.S. State Department has also certified that Iran is holding up its end of the bargain, and a host of experts affirmed these findings. IAEA Director General Amano said, "Iran is subject to the world's most robust nuclear verification regime."

In February 2019 the IAEA certified that Iran was still abiding by the deal.

In May 2019 the IAEA certified that Iran was abiding by the main terms of the deal, though questions were raised about how many advanced centrifuges Iran was allowed to have, as that was only loosely defined in the deal.

== Violations ==
On 9 November 2016 Deutsche Welle, citing an alleged source from the IAEA, reported that "Iran has violated the terms of its nuclear deal."

On 1 December 2016 the U.S. Senate voted to renew the Iran Sanctions Act (ISA) for another decade. The Obama administration and outside experts said the extension would have no practical effect and risked antagonizing Iran. Iran's Supreme Leader Ayatollah Khamenei, President Rouhani, and Foreign Ministry spokesman said that the extension of sanctions would be a breach of the nuclear deal. Some Iranian officials said that Iran might ramp up uranium enrichment in response. In January 2017 representatives from Iran, P5+1 and EU gathered in Vienna's Palais Coburg hotel to address Iran's complaint about the US bill.

The Trump administration said that Trump personally lobbied dozens of European officials against doing business with Iran during the May 2017 Brussels summit; this likely violated the terms of the JCPOA, which expressly states that the U.S. may not pursue "any policy specifically intended to directly and adversely affect the normalization of trade and economic relations with Iran". In July 2017 the Trump administration certified that Iran had upheld the agreement, but in October 2017 the Trump administration refused to recertify Iran's compliance with the deal, saying that "Iran has violated the agreement multiple times."

According to David Makovsky, a Middle East scholar at the Washington Institute for Near East Policy, Iran was not in compliance because under the terms of the deal, Iran was supposed to reveal all of its research into nuclear weapons, and that based on evidence presented by Israeli Prime Minister Benjamin Netanyahu on 30 April 2018, "it seems clear that they did not."

=== Dispute over access to military sites ===
Ali Khamenei banned allowing international inspectors into military sites. Trump and his administration said that Iranian military facilities could be used for nuclear-related activities barred under the agreement. Iran rejected Trump's request to allow inspection of Iran's military sites. However, Amano insisted that IAEA inspectors were entitled to inspect military sites under the agreement, although the IAEA has avoided requesting access to any military sites since the deal went into effect.

== See also ==
- Begin Doctrine
- Black Cube
- Iran and Libya Sanctions Act
- United States national emergency with respect to Iran
- 2016 U.S.–Iran naval incident
- Joint Comprehensive Plan of Action
- Iran–United States relations during the Obama administration
- Iran–United States relations during the first Trump administration
