= Reactions to the Iran nuclear deal =

International reaction to the 2015 Vienna pact on Iran's nuclear program

Joint Comprehensive Plan of Action
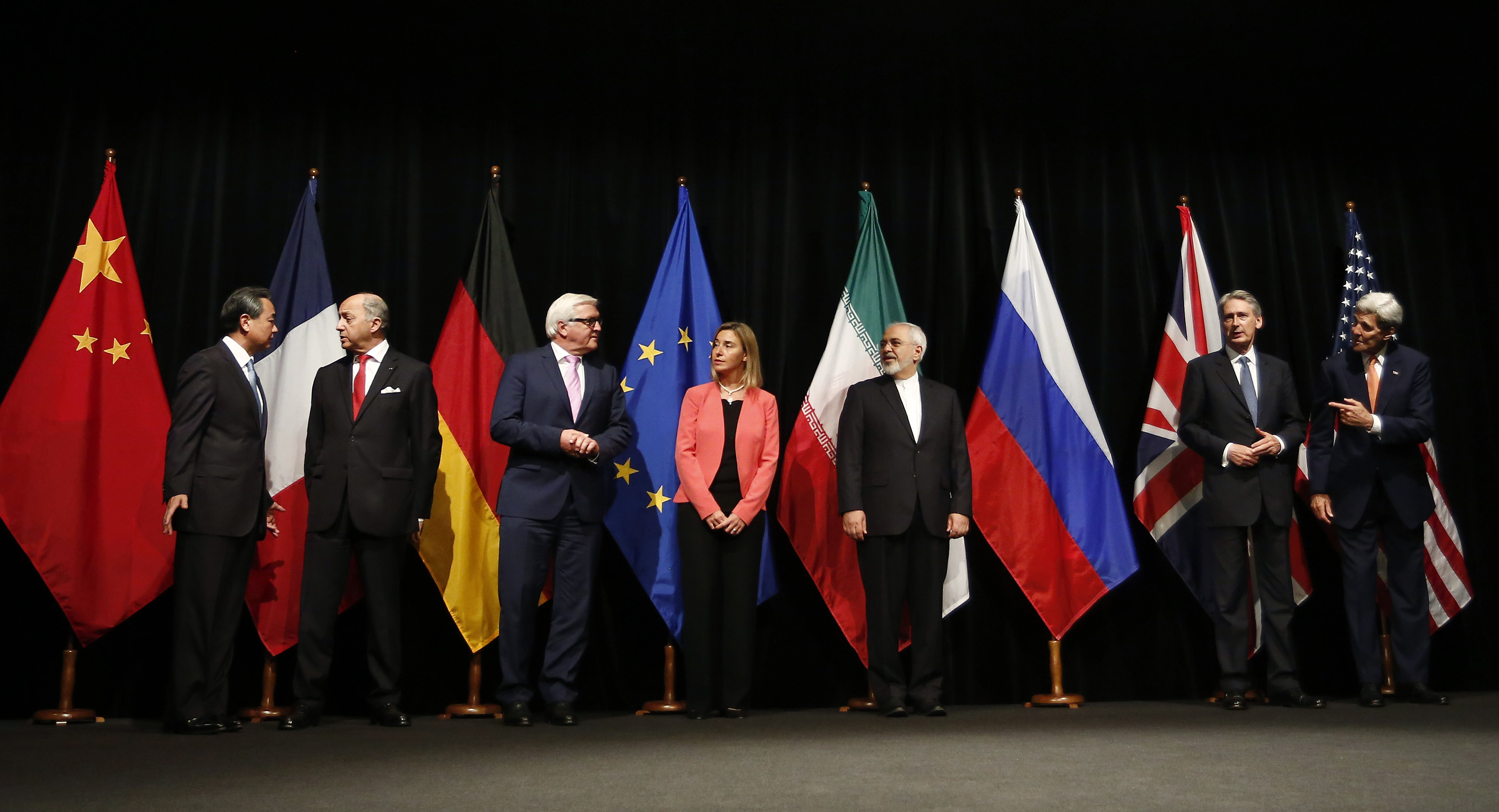
- Officials announcing the agreement
- Created: 14 July 2015
- Ratified: N/A (ratification not required)
- Date effective: 18 October 2015 (Adoption); 16 January 2016 (Implementation)
- Location: Vienna, Austria
- Signatories: China; France; Germany; European Union; Iran; Russia; United Kingdom; United States (withdrew)
- Purpose: Nuclear non-proliferation

The Joint Comprehensive Plan of Action (JCPOA; Persian: برنامه جامع اقدام مشترک, romanized: barnāmeye jāme'e eqdāme moshtarak, acronym: برجام BARJAM), known commonly as the Iran nuclear deal or Iran deal, is an agreement on the Iranian nuclear program reached in Vienna on 14 July 2015 between Iran, the P5+1 (the five permanent members of the United Nations Security Council—China, France, Russia, United Kingdom, United States—plus Germany), (Note: The P5+1 are also sometimes referred to as the "E3+3", for the "EU three" countries (France, the UK, and Germany) plus the three non-EU countries (the U.S., Russia, and China). The terms are interchangeable; this article uses the "P5+1" phrase.) and the European Union. The nuclear deal received a mixed international reaction, with many countries expressing praise or hope it could achieve the denuclearization of Iran. Some of Iran's neighbouring countries and U.S. lawmakers expressed skepticism about the agreement, seeing it as critically flawed.

== Reactions to the Plan ==
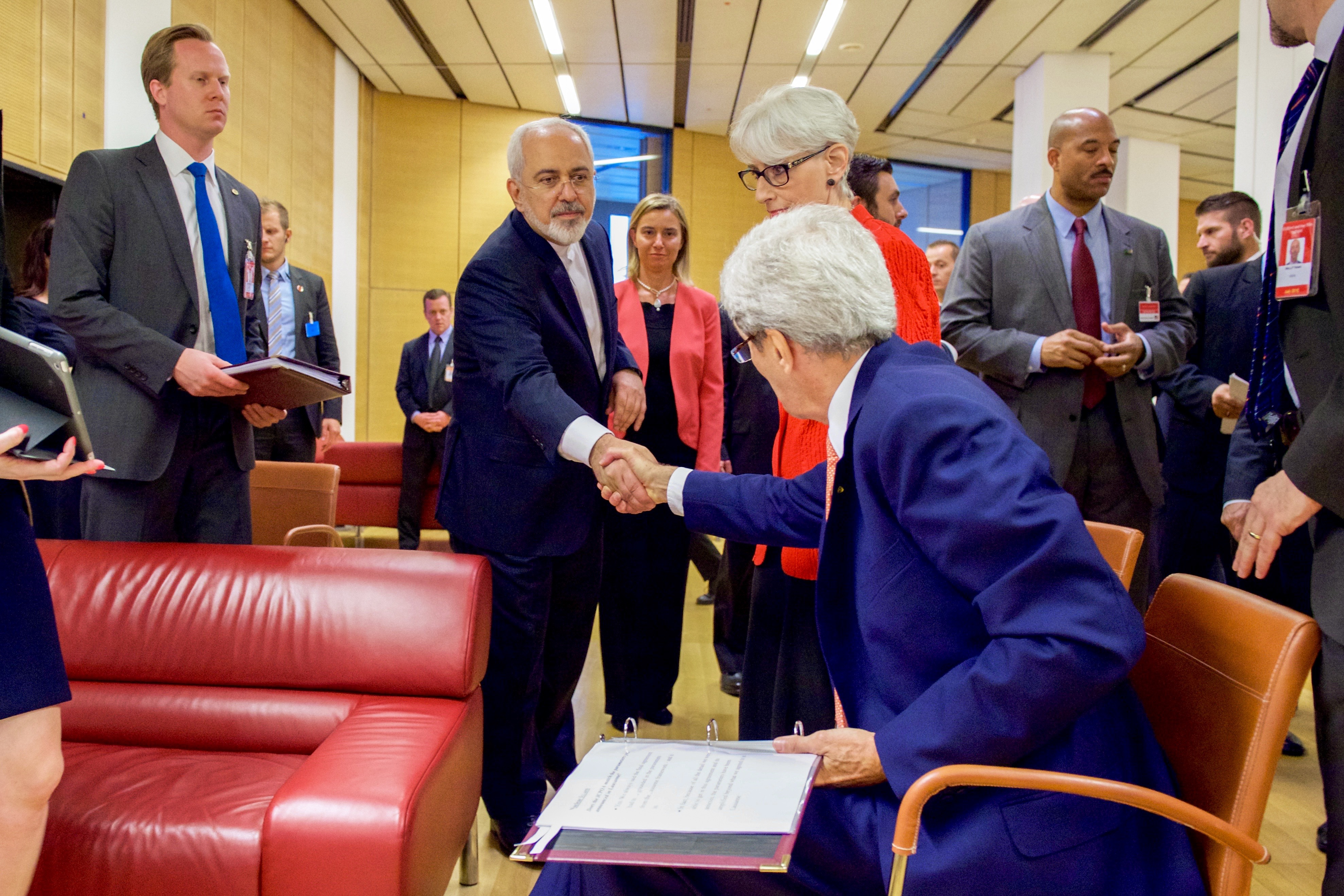
Iranian Minister of Foreign Affairs Mohammad Javad Zarif and U.S. Secretary of State John Kerry shaking hands at the end of negotiations on 14 July 2015

=== Political and diplomatic reactions ===
There was a significant worldwide response following the announcement of the agreement; more than 90 countries endorsed the agreement, as did many international organizations.

==== From countries that are parties to the JCPOA ====
- China
  - Foreign Minister Wang Yi said, "the most important achievement of the comprehensive agreement is that the international nuclear non-proliferation system is safeguarded. It can be said that China had played a unique and constructive role and thus is highly praised and affirmed by all parties. In the next step, there are still many matters to be attended to concerning the implementation of the agreement. China will continuously make new contribution [sic] to this end with a responsible attitude."
- European Union
  - High Representative of the Union for Foreign Affairs and Security Policy Federica Mogherini, who acted as coordinator for the powers, said it could "open the way to a new chapter in international relations and show that diplomacy, coordination, cooperation can overcome decades of tensions and confrontations" and that it is "a sign of hope for the entire world".
  - Donald Tusk, president of the European Council, congratulated the negotiating parties and said: "If fully implemented, the agreement could be a turning point in relations between Iran and the international community, paving the way to new avenues of cooperation between the EU and Iran. Geopolitically, it has the potential to be a game changer."
- France
  - In a Bastille Day speech, President Francois Hollande praised the deal and called upon Iran to "show that it is ready to help us end" the Syrian civil war. French Foreign Minister Laurent Fabius told Le Monde that the pact was a "robust agreement" that would last at least a decade. Both Hollande and Fabius pledged that France would be "extremely vigilant" in the implementation of the agreement.
  - Fabius visited Iran on 29 July, telling reporters in Tehran, "this deal allows the relations between our countries to develop and allows us to renew cooperation." His visit was controversial in Iran and met with public anger for several reasons.
- Germany
  - Chancellor Angela Merkel said that the agreement was "an important success" of international diplomacy.
  - Vice Chancellor and Economy Minister Sigmar Gabriel said that the agreement was a "historic breakthrough". In mid-July 2015, Gabriel, along with a delegation of German industry and science representatives, completed a three-day visit to Iran focused on bolstering German-Iranian trade. Gabriel said there was "great interest on the part of German industry in normalizing and strengthening economic relations with Iran".
- Iran
  - Iran's supreme leader, Ayatollah Ali Khamenei, who initially issued a letter of guidelines to President Rouhani on how to proceed with the deal, threatened to "set fire" to the nuclear deal if the West violated it. Rouhani said the agreement proved that "constructive engagement works" and was a step on the road to a wider goal of international cooperation: "With this unnecessary crisis resolved, new horizons emerge with a focus on shared challenges."
  - Minister of Foreign Affairs Mohammad Javad Zarif called it an "historic moment" and said: "Today could have been the end of hope on this issue, but now we are starting a new chapter of hope. Let's build on that."
  - In a 21 July speech to the Iranian Parliament, Zarif said that the agreement was a defeat for Israel, saying, "Never before was the Zionist regime so isolated, even among her own allies." On 12 August, after a meeting with Hizbullah leader Hassan Nasrallah, Zarif said that the agreement "created a historic opportunity to [sic] for regional cooperation to fight extremism and face threats posed by the Zionist entity".
  - Many Iranian families and youth celebrated at Vanak Square and elsewhere on the streets of Tehran on the evening of the agreement's announcements. Some held signs calling for the release of Iranian opposition leaders Mir Hussein Moussavi and Mehdi Karroubi from house arrest. Other ordinary Iranians cheered the announcement on social media.
  - On 16 July 2015, two days after the agreement was signed, Ayatollah Khamenei made his first public comments on the final agreement in a letter to President Rouhani posted on Khamenei's website. Khamenei wrote, "bringing the negotiations to a conclusion was a milestone", but "the prepared text, however, needs careful scrutiny". Iranian hard-liners took the letter as a signal of openness to criticism of the deal. In a speech in Tehran marking the end of Ramadan two days later, Khamenei said, "Our policies toward the arrogant government of the United States will not be changed at all," adding, "the Americans say they stopped Iran from acquiring a nuclear weapon ... They know it's not true. We had a fatwa, declaring nuclear weapons to be religiously forbidden under Islamic law. It had nothing to do with the nuclear talks." But Khamenei praised the negotiators who arranged the deal, which was taken as a sign that he would not seek to block it in the Iranian parliament or the Supreme National Security Council. Khamenei also expressed support for the agreement, saying: "After 12 years of struggling with the Islamic republic, the result is that they [the P5+1 nations] have to bear the turning of thousands of centrifuges in the country." Khamenei is believed to have approved the negotiations and the agreement, giving Rouhani crucial political cover to do so.
  - The New York Times reported, "Iran's influential hard-liners, who have criticized Mr. Rouhani in much the same way that President Obama has been denounced by Republicans in the United States, signaled their intent to undercut the agreement," which they believe to be too favorable to the West. Foad Izadi, a professor at the University of Tehran, complained that of the 19 Iranian "major red lines" identified by the supreme leader during negotiations, "18 and a half have been crossed." Conservative lawmaker Alireza Zakani said "celebrating too early can send a bad signal to the enemy."
  - Iran's official Islamic Republic News Agency stressed that under the agreement "world powers have recognized Iran's peaceful nuclear program and are to respect the nuclear rights of (Iran) within international conventions." The IRNA report also said, "The policy on preventing enrichment uranium is now failed" and stressed, "no Iranian nuclear facilities or centrifuges will be dismantled."
- Russian Federation
  - President Vladimir Putin said in a statement: "We are certain that the world heaved a sigh of relief today."
  - Foreign Minister Sergey Lavrov stated the accord "will favorably affect the general situation in the Middle East, North Africa and the Gulf".
- United Kingdom
  - Prime Minister David Cameron applauded the agreement, saying that it would help "make our world a safer place" and that Iran now had a "real opportunity" to benefit economically.
  - Foreign Secretary Philip Hammond criticized the Israeli government's position on the JCPOA, saying in the House of Commons, "no agreement with Iran would have been enough for Netanyahu" and "Israel prefers a permanent state of standoff" with Iran. At a joint press conference the next day in Jerusalem, Hammond and Netanyahu "sparred publicly" over the agreement, "veering off prepared comments ... in an awkward back-and-forth that extended what is usually a standard, brief public appearance with visiting officials into a spirited debate".
- United States
  - President Barack Obama addressed the nation in a 7 a.m. televised address from the White House, with Vice President Joe Biden at his side. Obama stated that the agreement "meets every single one of the bottom lines we established when we achieved a framework earlier this spring. Every pathway to a nuclear weapon is cut off. And the inspection and transparency regime necessary to verify that objective will be put in place." The president emphasized that the agreement is "not built on trust—it is built on verification". Obama vowed to veto any congressional action that would block the agreement's implementation, saying: "I am confident that this deal will meet the national security needs of the United States and our allies, so I will veto any legislation that prevents the successful implementation of this deal. We do not have to accept an inevitable spiral into conflict, and we certainly shouldn't seek it." Obama stated: "I welcome scrutiny of the details of this agreement" and added, "This is not the time for politics or posturing. Tough talk from Washington does not solve problems. Hard-nosed diplomacy, leadership that has united the world's major powers, offers a more effective way to verify that Iran is not pursuing a nuclear weapon."
  - At a press briefing in Vienna, Secretary of State John Kerry said that the agreement was "a measurable step away from the prospect of nuclear proliferation" and "the specter of conflict" and "there can be no question that this agreement will provide a stronger, more comprehensive, and more lasting means of limiting Iran's nuclear program than any realistic alternative." Kerry also stated, "The deal we have reached ... gives us the greatest assurance that we have had that Iran will not pursue a weapon covertly." Addressing critics of the agreement, Kerry stated, "those who spend a lot of time suggesting that something could be better have an obligation to provide an alternative that, in fact, works" and "sanctioning Iran until it capitulates makes for a powerful talking point and a pretty good political speech, but it's not achievable outside a world of fantasy." Kerry also stated, "we are under no illusions that the hard work is over. No one is standing here today to say that the path ahead is easy or automatic. We move now to a new phase—a phase that is equally critical and may prove to be just as difficult—and that is implementation."
  - Republicans lined up against the deal. The candidates for the Republican nomination for president in 2016 uniformly condemned it; Jeb Bush called it "dangerous, deeply flawed, and short sighted" while Lindsey Graham said it was a "death sentence for the state of Israel". Former Obama advisor Daniel Pfeiffer tweeted, "none of these GOP contenders would end this Iran Deal if they got to the White House," and that it would "massively damage US in the world".
  - Candidates for the Democratic nomination for president in 2016 welcomed the deal. Former Secretary of State Hillary Clinton called it an "important step that puts the lid on Iran's nuclear programs"; Senator Bernie Sanders called it "a victory for diplomacy over saber-rattling" that "could keep the United States from being drawn into another never-ending war in the Middle East".
  - Speaker of the House John Boehner, a Republican, called the JCPOA a "bad deal".
  - House Minority Leader Nancy Pelosi, a Democrat, said "I've closely examined this document. And it will have my strong support." Pelosi said that the agreement was "the product of years of tough, bold, clear-eyed leadership on the part of President Obama" and called it "a strong, effective option, for keeping the peace and stopping the proliferation of weapons of mass destruction".
  - Senate Majority Leader Mitch McConnell, a Republican, opposed the agreement, saying, "The comprehensive nuclear agreement announced today appears to further the flawed elements of April's interim agreement because the Obama Administration approached these talks from a flawed perspective: reaching the best deal acceptable to Iran, rather than actually advancing our national goal of ending Iran's nuclear program."
  - Senate Minority Leader Harry Reid, a Democrat, issued a brief statement on 14 July saying that the agreement was the result of years of hard work and "now it is incumbent on Congress to review this agreement with the thoughtful, level-headed process an agreement of this magnitude deserves." On 23 August, Reid endorsed the agreement, saying it "is the best path to stop Iran from obtaining a nuclear weapon" and that he would "do everything in my power to ensure that it stands".
  - Senate Armed Services Committee Chairman John McCain, a Republican, pledged to hold hearings on the deal during the sixty-day congressional review period and said he was "totally opposed to" it. Senate Foreign Relations Committee chairman Bob Corker, another Republican, also opposed the deal, saying that he believed that the West had conceded too much.
  - The New York Times editorial board wrote that the agreement "is potentially one of the most consequential accords in recent diplomatic history, with the ability not just to keep Iran from obtaining a nuclear weapon but also to reshape Middle East politics". They wrote: "It would be irresponsible to squander this chance to rein in Iran's nuclear program."
  - On May 8, 2018, President Donald Trump called the agreement "a horrible one-sided deal that should have never, ever been made" and the White House published a statement detailing his objections to it. Trump announced the United States would withdraw from the agreement.

==== From other countries ====
- Holy See
  - The Vatican applauded the deal, saying in a statement: "The agreement on the Iranian nuclear program is viewed in a positive light by the Holy See."
- Israel
  - Prime Minister Benjamin Netanyahu said: "Israel is not bound by this deal with Iran, because Iran continues to seek our destruction, we will always defend ourselves." Netanyahu called the deal a "capitulation" and "a bad mistake of historic proportions". Deputy Foreign Minister Tzipi Hotovely called the deal an "historic surrender" and said that Israel would "act with all means to try and stop the agreement being ratified"—indicating that it would try to use its influence to block the agreement in the U.S. Congress, Naftali Bennett, leader of the Bayit Yehudi party (which is a member of the government coalition), said: "The history books have been rewritten again today, and this period will be deemed particularly grave and dangerous."
  - Most Israelis were similarly critical of the agreement. Netanyahu's leading political opponent, Zionist Union leader Isaac Herzog, opposed the deal, stating that it "will unleash a lion from the cage" and make Iran "a nuclear-threshold state in a decade or so"; another Zionist Union member of the Knesset, Shelly Yachimovich, called the JCPOA a "dangerous, damaging agreement" Yair Lapid, head of the opposition Yesh Atid party, called the agreement "Israel's biggest foreign policy failure since the establishment of the state". At the same time, many of these figures also criticized Netanyahu's diplomatic campaign against the plan, calling it ineffectual and counter-productive. Yachimovich said that Netanyahu should "immediately cease and desist from confronting the Americans". Lapid called on the prime minister to resign, stating: "I also am not thrilled by Obama's policies. But Netanyahu crossed a line that caused the White House to stop listening to Israel. In the last year we weren't even in the arena, we had no representative in Vienna, our intelligence cooperation was harmed, and the door to the White House was closed to us."
  - The head of the opposition Yisrael Beiteinu party, Avigdor Lieberman, described the agreement as a "surrender to terror".
  - Zehava Gal-On, head of the opposition Meretz party, voiced cautious support for the JCPOA, writing, "The agreement is not perfect, it does not turn Iran into lovers of Israel all of the sudden, but it does aim to prevent Iran from obtaining a bomb, regulate the international mechanisms to monitoring it and allows the international community to act if the agreement is violated."
  - The Joint (Arab) List party of Arab Israeli MKs welcomed the agreement.
  - Ami Ayalon, former head of the Israeli internal security service Shin Bet and former commander of the Israeli Navy, said that the agreement was "the best option" for Israel, saying, "When negotiations began, Iran was two months away from acquiring enough material for a [nuclear] bomb. Now it will be 12 months." Ayalon said that opposition to the deal in Israel was "more emotional than logical". Efraim Halevy, the director of the Israeli intelligence agency Mossad from 1998 to 2002, wrote in support of the agreement in Yedioth Ahronoth, arguing that the JCPOA includes "components that are crucial for Israel's security" and warning that a collapse of the agreement will leave Iran "free to do as it pleases". Chuck Freilich, a former deputy national security adviser in Israel and current senior fellow at Harvard University's Belfer Center, wrote an op-ed for The New York Times arguing that the JCPOA is "a good deal for Israel" and that by avoiding the threat of a nuclear Iran, the agreement "will enable Israel to divert precious resources to more immediate threats" and to pressing domestic needs.
- Italy
  - Prime Minister Matteo Renzi said: "The agreement sows new hope for a regional peace project. Italy will actively support this process, and will ensure that it can benefit all countries of the region, without exception, with the aim of reaching a Middle East finally stable, where all peoples can live in peace and security."
- Kazakhstan
  - Kazakhstan's President Nursultan Nazarbayev welcomed the progress in the implementation of the Joint Comprehensive Action Plan on the regulation of the situation around Iran's nuclear programme.
  - President Nazarbayev said, "... in 2013 Almaty hosted two rounds of talks on Iran's nuclear program, which contributed to the resumption of negotiations between "P5+1" and Iran. We are proud that the results of those two rounds of talks in Almaty have served as foundation for JCPOA adopted two years later."
- Arab states of the Persian Gulf
  - Kuwait: Sabah bin Ahmad Al-Sabah, the emir of Kuwait, congratulated all the nations involved in the negotiations and hoped the deal would lead to stability in the region.
  - Oman: Oman welcomed the agreement. Oman and its leader, Sultan Qaboos bin Said al Said, were praised for its key role in the talks by diplomats and leaders from both Iran and the P5+1. Oman has good relations with both Iran and the United States and played a key role in the beginning of the talks; Oman offered to establish a back channel between Iran and the United States in 2009, and the first secret talks were held between U.S. and Iranian diplomats in July 2012 in Muscat.
  - Qatar: The government welcomed the agreement as a "significant step" toward enhancing regional peace and stability.
  - Saudi Arabia: On 14 July, the official Saudi Press Agency released a statement attributed to an "official source" saying, "The Kingdom of Saudi Arabia has always believed in the importance of reaching a deal regarding Iran's nuclear program that ensures preventing Iran from obtaining nuclear weapons and at the same time includes a specific, strict and permanent mechanism for inspecting all sites—including military ones—along with a mechanism for rapidly and effectively re-imposing sanctions in case Iran violates the deal." U.S. Secretary of Defense Ashton B. Carter said that Saudi Arabia approved of the international agreement, even though "the Saudis, along with other Sunni Arab countries in the Persian Gulf, view the predominantly Shiite Iran as a regional adversary." The Saudis have undertaken a military campaign in Yemen against Houthi insurgents there.
- Elsewhere in the Muslim world
  - Afghanistan: Afghan president Mohammad Ashraf Ghani congratulated "the government and people of Islamic Republic of Iran on the occasion and reiterates that the government of Afghanistan welcomes any efforts that result in expansion of political and economic relations between states as well as consolidation and strengthening of peace and stability in the region."
  - Egypt: The Egyptian foreign ministry said the deal will prevent an arms race in the Middle East. The statement expressed hopes that the Middle East can be free of all weapons of mass destruction, including nuclear weapons.
  - Iraq: The Iraqi government applauded the agreement.
  - Pakistan: The Ministry of Foreign Affairs "welcomed" the agreement, saying, "reciprocal confidence-building measures ... augur well for peace and security in our region." Former President Asif Ali Zardari welcomed the deal as "a triumph of diplomacy and negotiations over coercion and hostility" and called upon the government to push forward with plans for construction of an Iran–Pakistan gas pipeline.
  - Syria: President Bashar al-Assad, an Iranian ally, called the agreement as "a great victory" and wrote in a letter to Ayatollah Ali Khamenei, the Iranian supreme leader, that the agreement would be a "major turning point in the history of Iran, the region and the world".
  - Turkey: The Ministry of Foreign Affairs welcomed the agreement in a statement saying that its implementation would contribute to regional peace, security and stability. Observers noted that although Turkey would benefit economically from the lifting of sanctions in the future, Turkish officials seemed to be "uneasy" of the potential for Iran to reemerge as a regional power that might overshadow Turkey.
- Other countries
  - Australia: Minister for Foreign Affairs Julie Bishop endorsed the agreement, saying: "What it has done is [bring] Iran into the international regime of inspections of nuclear programs, and that is a good thing. I think we have to give this comprehensive plan a chance."
  - Canada: Foreign Minister Rob Nicholson stated at the time of the announcement: "We appreciate the efforts of the P5+1 to reach an agreement. At the same time, we will continue to judge Iran by its actions not its words. To this end, Canada will continue to support the efforts of the International Atomic Energy Agency to monitor Iran's compliance with its commitments." The Globe and Mail reported at the time that Canada would keep its sanctions in place, at least initially, although Canada's own sanctions will have little impact on the Iranian economy. While the Canadian government under Prime Minister Stephen Harper was opposed to the agreement, the new Canadian government under Prime Minister Justin Trudeau supported it, and in February 2016, following the implementation of the agreement, Canada lifted most of its sanctions on Iran.
  - Colombia: President Juan Manuel Santos applauded the agreement as "another triumph of diplomacy over confrontation" and praised President Obama and Secretary of State Kerry for their "courage" in securing the deal.
  - India: The Indian embassy in Tehran stated, "India welcomes the announcement of lifting of nuclear-related sanctions against Iran. The milestone represents a significant success for patient diplomacy and signals a new chapter of peace and prosperity. India looks forward to further developing its longstanding, close, and mutually beneficial economic cooperation with Iran, including in the spheres of energy and regional connectivity."
  - North Korea: The Foreign Ministry said that North Korea had no interest in a nuclear disarmament agreement, saying: "We do not have any interest at all on dialogue for unilaterally freezing or giving up our nukes."
  - Norway: In a statement, Foreign Minister Børge Brende said: "This historic agreement will benefit the international community, the Middle East and Iran. It will also pave the way for closer political and economic contact with Iran."
  - Philippines: The Department of Foreign Affairs welcomed the agreement, saying that it was an important measure to promote both regional and global security. They also called on the international community to maintain the positive momentum for long-term peace created by the agreement.

==== From international organizations ====
- United Nations
  - Secretary-General of the United Nations Ban Ki-moon issued a statement saying: "I warmly welcome the historic agreement in Vienna today and congratulate the P5+1 and Iran for reaching this agreement. This is testament to the value of dialogue. ... The United Nations stands ready to fully cooperate with the parties in the process of implementing this historic and important agreement."
  - International Atomic Energy Agency (IAEA) – Director General Yukiya Amano welcomed the agreement and congratulated Iran, the P5+1 countries and the European Union and said he is confident that IAEA is capable of doing the necessary monitoring and verification activities when requested.
- Other international organizations and figures
  - NATO Secretary General Jens Stoltenberg called the agreement a "historic breakthrough" and stated: "It is critical for Iran to implement the provisions of today's agreement and to fulfill all its international obligations and advance security in the region and beyond."
  - Arab League Secretary-General Nabil Elaraby said he hoped the JCPOA would bring "stability and security" to the Middle East.
  - Gulf Cooperation Council – The Gulf Cooperation Council publicly announced backing for the agreement at a 2 August 2015 summit in Doha, Qatar. Khalid al-Attiyah, the foreign minister of Qatar (which currently chairs the GCC) said at a news conference with U.S. Secretary of State Kerry following the summit, "This was the best option amongst other options in order to try to come up with a solution for the nuclear weapons of Iran though dialogue, and this came up as a result of the efforts exerted by the United States of America and its allies. [Secretary Kerry] let us know that there's going to be a kind of live oversight for Iran not to gain or to get any nuclear weapons. This is reassuring to the region."
  - Association of Southeast Asian Nations – On 6 August 2015, following the 5th East Asia Summit Foreign Ministers' Meeting, the foreign ministers of the 10 ASEAN nations, along with the foreign ministers of India, Japan, New Zealand and South Korea, endorsed the deal, welcoming it as an "important resolution" to a pressing global concern. Shortly before the joint ASEAN statement was released, U.S. Secretary of State Kerry met Japanese Foreign Minister Fumio Kishida in Kuala Lumpur to mark the 70th anniversary of the atomic bombing of Hiroshima.
  - Mohamed ElBaradei, former director general of the International Atomic Energy Agency, hailed the agreement as a triumph of diplomacy.
  - The International Crisis Group called the deal "a triumph of nuclear diplomacy" and urged both the United States Congress and Iranian Majlis to approve it.

=== Expert reactions ===
Following the unveiling of the agreement, "a general consensus quickly emerged" among nuclear experts and watchdogs that the agreement "is as close to a best-case situation as reality would allow". In August 2015, 75 arms control and nuclear nonproliferation experts signed a statement endorsing the deal as "a net-plus for international nuclear nonproliferation efforts" that exceeds the historical standards for arms control agreements. The Bulletin of the Atomic Scientists invited top international security experts to comment on the final agreement.

- Jeffrey Lewis, arms control expert and director of the East Asia Nonproliferation Program at the Monterey Institute of International Studies, reviewed the final agreement and gave it a positive assessment, saying that he would give it an "A" grade. While Lewis was skeptical about the chances of a workable deal emerging in 2014, during the negotiations, Lewis said that the final agreement was "a good deal because it slows down [the Iranian] nuclear program ... And it puts monitoring and verification measures in place that mean if they try to build a bomb, we're very likely to find out, and to do so with enough time that we have options to do something about it. There's a verifiable gap between their bomb option and an actual bomb. That's why it's a good deal." Lewis said that the final agreement was very similar to the April 2015 framework agreement. Lewis does not believe that the agreement will fundamentally alter the U.S.-Iranian relationship, seeing the agreement instead as "a really straightforward measure to slow down an enrichment program that was going gangbusters".
- Lawrence Korb and Katherine Blakeley, senior fellow and policy analyst, respectively, at the Center for American Progress, wrote that the agreement was "one of the most comprehensive and detailed nuclear arms agreements ever reached". Korb and Blakeley wrote, "a good look at the three main legs of the agreement shows that this deal is, in fact, a good one, for the United States and for the international community." Korb and Blakey said that the agreement "precludes Iranian development of a nuclear weapon by shutting down all of the pathways Iran might use to accumulate enough nuclear material to make a weapon" and praised components of the agreement which keep Iran subject to the constraints of the Nuclear Non-proliferation Treaty, provides for robust IAEA monitoring and verification, and links the phased lifting of nuclear-related sanctions to IAEA verification of Iranian compliance.
- Frank von Hippel, senior research physicist and professor of public and international affairs emeritus at the Program on Science and Global Security at Princeton University, wrote, "The July 14 agreement is a political miracle" in which "Iran has agreed to back away from the nuclear-weapon threshold in exchange for a lifting of nuclear-related sanctions." Von Hippel wrote, "The Obama administration argues—and I agree—that the ratcheting back of Iran's enrichment capacity will give the world a much longer warning time should Iran attempt to build a bomb." Von Hippel suggested that once the first ten years of the agreement were complete, "One option that should be explored is multinational ownership and management of Iran's enrichment complex by a group of countries—perhaps including the United States."
- Frederick H. Fleitz, former CIA nonproliferation analyst and currently of the Center for Security Policy, wrote, "The provisions of this agreement ... contains minor concessions by Iran but huge concessions by the United States that will Iran to continue its nuclear program with weak verification provisions. Conditions for sanctions relief will be very easy for Iran to meet. Iran will not only continue to enrich uranium under the agreement, it will continue to develop advanced centrifuges that will reduce the timeline to an Iranian nuclear bomb."
- William H. Tobey, senior fellow at Harvard University's Belfer Center for Science and International Affairs, was critical of the agreement, writing that given Iranian hostility to the United States and Israel, the agreement provides little "more than a speed bump on the path to Iran's nuclear ambition". Tobey wrote that that "speed bump" is not "a good trade for at least $150 billion in sanctions relief".
- Kingston Reif, director for disarmament and threat reduction policy at the Center for Arms Control and Non-Proliferation, said that although the JCPOA is "not perfect", it "will be a net plus for nonproliferation and will enhance U.S. and regional security". Reif wrote that it was "clear that Tehran had to retreat from many of its initial demands, including in the areas of the scale of uranium enrichment it needed, the intrusiveness of inspections it would tolerate, and the pace of sanctions relief it would demand". Reif also wrote that the JCPOA "will keep Iran further away from the ability to make nuclear weapons for far longer than the alternative of additional sanctions or a military strike possibly could", and as a result, the threat of regional proliferation throughout the Middle East was diminished. Reif added: "A perfect deal was not attainable. Overall, it's a very strong and good deal, but it wasn't negotiations that resulted in a score of 100-0 for the [United States]. That's not how international negotiations go. ... The monitoring and verification regime in this deal is the most comprehensive and intrusive regime that has ever been negotiated."
- Siegfried S. Hecker of the Center for International Security and Cooperation at Stanford University wrote, "the Iran nuclear deal was hard-won and is better than any other reasonably achievable alternative." Hecker wrote, "Iran agreed to considerably greater restrictions on its program than what I thought was possible." Hecker's view is that it is "imperative that the international community develops a credible and decisive response in the event of an Iranian violation of the agreement". He noted, "this agreement was one of the most technically informed diplomatic negotiations I have seen," with both sides advised by "world-class nuclear scientists": U.S. Secretary of State Kerry by U.S. Secretary of Energy Moniz, and Iranian Foreign Minister Zarif by Atomic Energy Organization of Iran chief Ali-Akbar Salehi.
- Zia Mian of the Program on Science & Global Security at Princeton University wrote that the JCPOA offers three "important lessons for those wanting to make progress towards nuclear disarmament and a more peaceful world". The first lesson was, "nuclear diplomacy can work. But it requires hard political work of many kinds"; Mian praised both the "creative technical and policy analysis work from within and outside governments to create options for negotiators to find common ground" as well as "the patient grassroots work to engage and mobilize public constituencies that brought to power leaders in the United States and in Iran willing to engage with each other and to take risks for a more peaceful relationship between their countries". The second lesson was, "International nuclear politics is bound to domestic politics, for good and ill. The Iran agreement has come despite determined hostility from conservatives within the United States, Israel, Saudi Arabia, the Gulf states, and Iran. Seeing the world as a hierarchy shaped by power and fear, and locked in rigid, exclusivist national or religious identities, they press for advantage and privilege or to maintain the status quo. Sharing a propensity for mistrust, coercion, and violence, they would risk war with those they see as enemies rather than try dialogue and possible agreement on a peaceful future based on the ideals of equity and respect for others. These opponents will derail the Iran deal if they can." The third lesson is, "nuclear disarmament issues do not exist in isolation"; Mian called for more foreign minister-level talks in the Middle East, rather than expanded U.S. military assistance in the region.
- Ernest Moniz, U.S. Secretary of Energy and a nuclear physicist and former professor at the Massachusetts Institute of Technology who was a key member of the U.S. negotiating team, stated that the JCPOA helps put Iran further from a nuclear weapon not only in the first fifteen years, with "lots of very, very explicit constraints on the program that roll back current activities", but also beyond that period, because the agreement commits Iran to join the Additional Protocol. Former IAEA Deputy Director Olli Heinonen and former Iraq weapons inspector David Albright expressed concerns with the length of a review process for inspecting undeclared facilities, stating that a delay up to a maximum of 24 days was too long. Heinonen said, "it is clear that a facility of sizable scale cannot simply be erased in three weeks' time without leaving traces," but said there was a risk that the Iranians could hide small-scale work, such as creating uranium components of a nuclear weapon, particularly because they have experience with cheating. Albright said that activities on "a small scale", such as experiments with high explosives or a small plant to make centrifuges operation could possibly be cleared out in 24 days. Former U.S. State Department official Robert J. Einhorn, who took part in P5+1 nuclear talks with Iran from 2009 to 2013, said, "a limit shorter than 24 days would have been desirable," but "it is probably the case that the greater the significance of a covert activity, the more difficult it will be to remove evidence of it in 24 days." U.S. Energy Department officials said that if the Iranians attempted to conduct centrifuge test, uranium conversion, or other activities, contamination would be generated that is very difficult to conceal.
- At a September 2015 panel discussion at the University of California, Los Angeles (UCLA) with Albert Carnesale (a former SALT I negotiator), Dalia Dassa Kaye (of the RAND Corporation), and Aslı Bâli and Steven Spiegel of UCLA, the panelists came a general consensus that the JCPOA "should be given a chance to work" and "despite its flaws, the agreement was worth pursuing and that the alternative would have been no agreement at all."
- Henner Fürtig, a senior member of German Institute of Global and Area Studies and a professor at the University of Hamburg wrote that the accord contains multiple victories for all sides. It is a "triumph of international diplomacy" and "rarely reached consensus" for the United Nations and the UNSC, but "it is no panacea" resolving other conflicts in the Middle East.

=== In popular culture ===
The American TV series Madam Secretary built a whole season around the negotiations. Five years before the deal, in 24's season 8, the negotiations between the United States leaders and "President Hassan" of Islamic republic of Kamistan to abandon his nuclear technology programme was shown, which drew comparison to the US-Iran dispute. However the deal was contrarily to Homeland's season 3 plot that "fueled nuclear paranoia" against Iran.

After the deal, a joke began circulating in Iran that the name of city of Arak would change to "Barack" in honor of Obama, and that in return, the United States would change the name of Manhattan borough to "Mash Hassan" (Persian: مش حسن) which is a very casual way of referring to Rouhani.

Javad Zarif's efforts in the negotiations drew comparisons to mythological Arash the Archer, and two former Prime Ministers: Mohammad Mosaddegh, who led the withdrawal of foreigners and nationalization of the Iranian oil industry and was overthrown by American–British coup d'état, because both fought foreigners for Iran's rights; and Amir Kabir, because both faced domestic hostility through their way to gain more interest for the nation.

=== Public opinion surveys ===
==== United States (nationwide) ====
Public polling on the issue has yielded varied and sometimes contradictory results, depending on the question wording, whether the poll explains the provisions of the agreement, and whether an "undecided" option is offered. Polls have consistently shown polarization by party affiliation, with majorities of self-identified Democrats supporting the agreement and majorities of self-identified Republicans opposing it.

Poll	Sample	Conducted	Sample size margin of error	Question(s) Asked	Findings	Reference
YouGov	U.S. adults	14–16 July	1,000; ±3.9%	Support/oppose (major provisions described)	43% support, 30% oppose, 26% unsure	
Abt-SRBI for Washington Post/ABC News	U.S. adults	16–19 July	1,002; ±3.5%	Support/oppose (major provisions described); Confidence that agreement will prevent Iran from developing nuclear weapons	56% support, 37% oppose, 7% no opinion 35% very/somewhat confident, 64% not confident	
Pew Research Center	U.S. adults	14–20 July	2,002; ±2.5; 1,672; ±2.7%	Have you heard about agreement? Support/oppose based on what you know (provisions not described)	34% heard a lot, 44% heard a little, 22% have not heard (Among those who have heard at least a little) 48% disapprove, 38% approve, 14% do not know	
Steven M. Cohen/Social Science Research Solutions for Los Angeles Jewish Journal	U.S. adults	16–20 July	505	Support/oppose (major provisions described); Should Congress vote to approve or oppose the deal?	28% support, 24% oppose, 48% don't know enough to say 41% approve, 38% disapprove, 21% undecided.	
Steven M. Cohen/Social Science Research Solutions for Los Angeles Jewish Journal	Jewish American adults	16–20 July	501	Support/oppose (major provisions described); Should Congress vote to approve or oppose the deal?	47.5% approve, 27.6% oppose, 24.6% don't know enough to say 53.6% approve, 34.7% oppose, 11.7% don't know	
YouGov for The Economist	U.S. adults	18–20 July	1,000; ±4.3%	Support/oppose (major provisions described); Do you want your Senators to support or oppose the international agreement?	15% strongly support, 26% tend to support; 16% tend to oppose; 17% strongly oppose; 16% not sure 45% support; 27% oppose; 27% not sure	
Public Policy Polling	U.S. registered voters	23–24 July	730; ±3.6%	Support/oppose (major provisions described); Should Congress allow agreement to go forward or block it?	35% strongly support; 19% somewhat support; 6% somewhat oppose; 32% strongly oppose; 8% not sure 54% go forward; 39% block; 7% not sure	
ORC for CNN	U.S. adults	22–25 July	1,017; ±3%	Should Congress approve or reject the deal?	44% approve; 52% reject; 5% no opinion	
Quinnipiac	U.S. registered voters	23–28 July	1,644; ±2.4%	Support/oppose (provisions not described)	28% support; 57% oppose; 15% don't know/NA	
Public Opinion Strategies & Hart Research Associates for Wall Street Journal/NBC News	U.S. adults	26–30 July	500	Support/oppose (major provisions described)	35% support, 33% oppose, 32% do not know enough	
Anderson Robbins Research & Shaw & Company Research for Fox News	U.S. registered voters	11–13 August	1,008 ±3%	In you were in Congress, would approve or reject the deal?	31% approve, 58% reject, 10% don't know	
ORC for CNN	U.S. adults	13–16 August	500 ±4.5%	Favor/oppose a hypothetical agreement (major provisions explained)	50% favor, 46% oppose, 4% no opinion	
ORC for CNN	U.S. adults	13–16 August	500 ±4.5%	Should Congress approve or reject the deal? (provisions not described)	41% approve, 56% reject, 2% no opinion	
Quinnipiac	U.S. registered voters	20–25 August	1,563; ±2.5%	Support/oppose (provisions not described)	25% support; 55% oppose; 20% don't know/NA	
Pew Research Center	U.S. adults	3–7 September	1,004; ±3.6%	Approve/disapprove the agreement	21% approve; 49% disapprove; 30% don't know/refused	
University of Maryland Program for Public Consultation / Center for International and Security Studies	U.S. registered voters who took part in National Citizens Cabinet (policymaking simulation involving a briefing and hearing of expert-vetted arguments from both sides of the debate)	17–20 September	702; ±3.7%	Final recommendation after hearing alternatives	55% approve agreement; 14% pursue better terms; 23% ramp up sanctions; 7% threaten military force	

==== United States (specific communities) ====
- According to a Zogby Research Services poll for the Public Affairs Alliance of Iranian Americans, conducted 20–31 May 2015, 64% of Iranian Americans support the Iran deal, and 8 in 10 say it will improve Iran's relations with the West.
- A poll of American Jewish adults conducted by GBA Strategies for J Street (which supports the agreement) from 21–23 July found that 60 percent of American Jews support the agreement. The poll found that: "There is broad support for the agreement, regardless of age, gender, region, Jewish organizational engagement, and awareness about the agreement." The poll found that support was strong across every denomination except for Orthodox Jews, with 67% of Reform Jews in support, 63% of Jews of no particular denomination in support, and 55% of Conservative Jews in support.
- According to a Quinnipiac poll taken 30 July – 4 August 43% of New York City voters oppose the agreement, while 36% support it; 42% said that the agreement would make the world less safe, while 40% said it will make the world more safe. Among Jewish voters in New York City, 33% support the agreement while 53% oppose it, and 51% say the agreement will make the world less safe, while 37% say that the agreement will make the world more safe.
- According to a Public Policy Polling poll of New York City voters taken 11–12 August, 58% of New York City voters support the Iran agreement, while 35% oppose it; 49% of New York City voters want their members of Congress to let the agreement go forward, while 33% want their members of Congress to block the agreement. The agreement achieved majority support from women and men; whites, African Americans, and Hispanics; and in every age group.
- A GfK poll of American Jews conducted for the American Jewish Committee between 7 and 22 August found that American Jews narrowly favored the agreement with 50.6% approving and 47.2% disapproving.

==== Iran ====
- According to a poll conducted from 12–28 May 2015 by the University of Tehran Center for Public Opinion Research, the independent, Toronto-based firm IranPoll, and the Center for International and Security Studies at the University of Maryland School of Public Policy, 57% of Iranians support the deal, whereas 15% opposed it.
- According to First Vice President Eshaq Jahangiri's interview on 6 August 2015, an Iranian government poll indicates that 80%-88% of Iranians support the Iran deal, whereas 4% oppose it.
- A poll conducted 27 May to 29 May 2015, by private Virginia-based Information and Public Opinion Solutions LLC (iPOS), suggests that a 63% majority of Iranians favor a deal, with 12% conditional approval (they would support it only if certain advantages for Iran are contained within a final agreement). Answering "If Iran and the West reach a nuclear deal, do you agree or disagree (with) a normalization of relations between Iran and the US?", 52% agreed and 20% disagreed. The poll was conducted by phone with a random sample of 680 Iranians 18-years-old and older.

==== Germany ====
- A July 2015 nationally representative survey of German adults conducted by YouGov Germany Omnibus found that overall, "63% of Germans support the deal to curb Iran's nuclear program, while only 18% oppose it and 20% don't know."

== See also ==
- Begin Doctrine
- Black Cube
- Iran and Libya Sanctions Act
- United States national emergency with respect to Iran
- Iran–United States relations during the Obama administration
- 2016 U.S.–Iran naval incident
- Joint Comprehensive Plan of Action
- Aftermath of the Joint Comprehensive Plan of Action
