= Iran–United States relations during the Obama administration =

Iran–United States relations

- Iran: United States

Diplomatic mission
- Interests Section in the Pakistani Embassy, Washington, D.C.: Interests Section in the Swiss Embassy, Tehran

Envoy
- Director of the Interest Section Mehdi Atefat: United States Special Representative for Iran Abram Paley

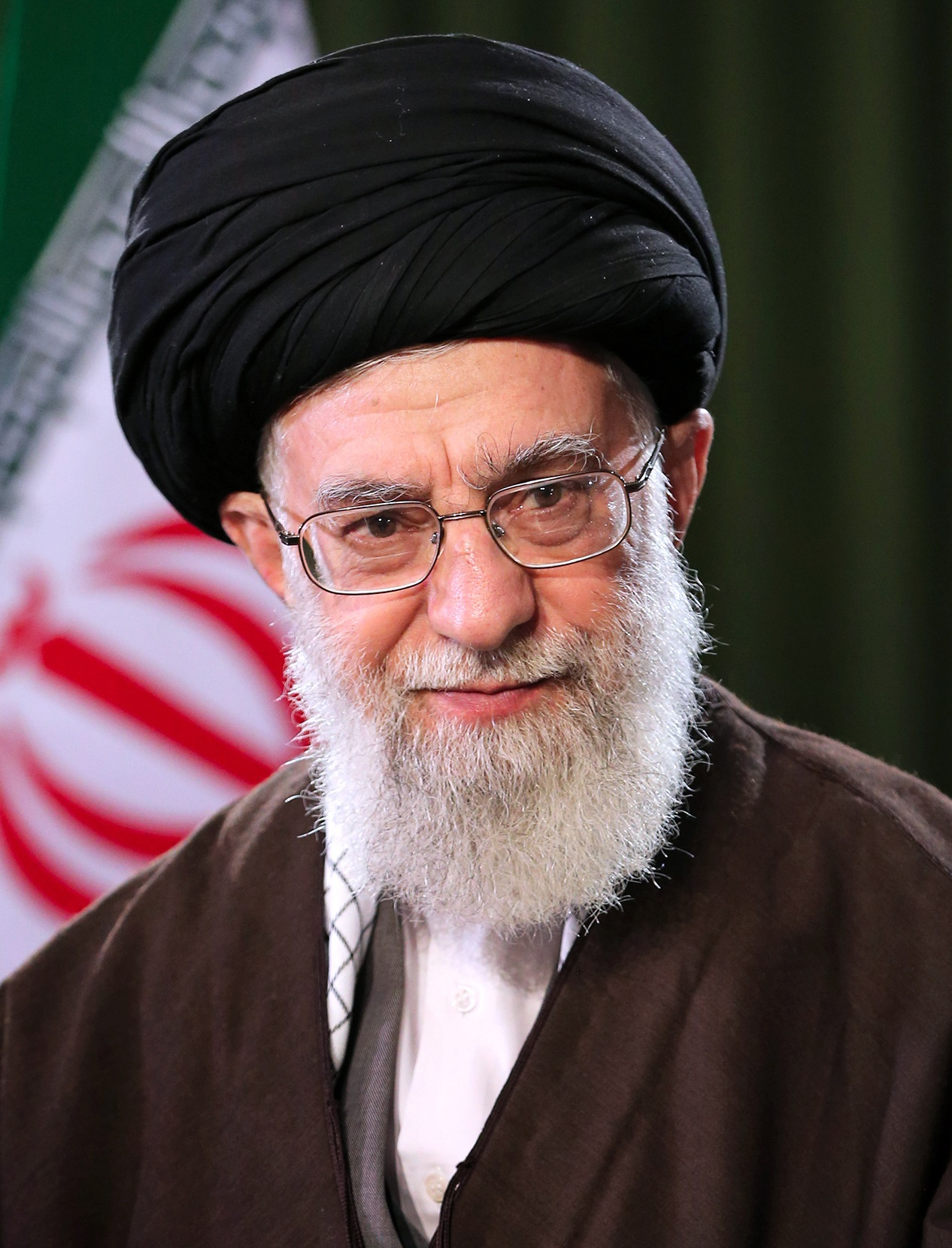
Ali Khamenei

Barack Obama

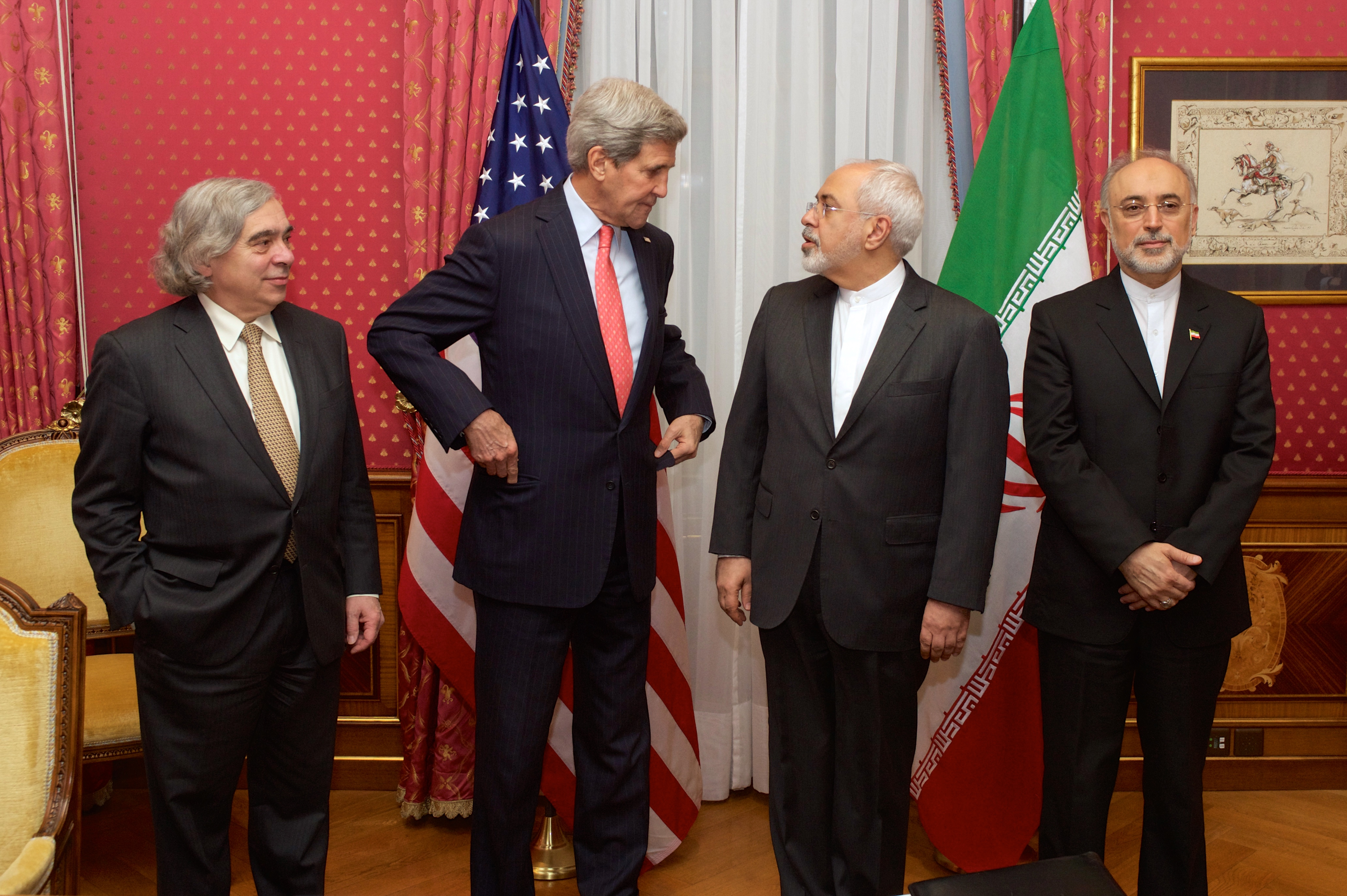
The ministers of foreign affairs of the United States and Iran, John Kerry and Mohammad Javad Zarif, meeting in Lausanne, Switzerland (16 March 2015).

Iran–United States relations during the Obama administration (2009–2017) were defined by a shift from confrontation to cautious engagement, culminating in the landmark nuclear agreement of 2015.

At the start of Obama's presidency, both sides exchanged public messages signaling a possible thaw, with Iran voicing long-standing grievances and the United States calling for mutual respect and responsibility. However, after Mahmoud Ahmadinejad's disputed re-election in 2009, which sparked mass protests and allegations of fraud, the United States responded with skepticism and concern. In late 2011 and early 2012, Iran threatened to close the Strait of Hormuz and warned a U.S. aircraft carrier not to return to the Persian Gulf. The U.S. rejected the warning and maintained its naval presence, while experts doubted Iran's ability to sustain a blockade.

The 2013 election of President Hassan Rouhani, seen as a moderate, marked a shift in tone, with his outreach at the UN and a historic phone call with Obama signaling renewed diplomatic engagement. While high-level contact resumed and symbolic gestures were exchanged, conservative backlash in Iran highlighted internal divisions over rapprochement. In 2015, the United States and other world powers reached the Joint Comprehensive Plan of Action (JCPOA) with Iran, under which Iran agreed to limit its nuclear program in exchange for sanctions relief. The agreement marked a major diplomatic achievement for the Obama administration, though it faced skepticism in Congress and mixed public support in the U.S.

Despite the JCPOA, tensions between the United States and Iran persisted over ballistic missile tests, continued U.S. sanctions, and European business hesitancy due to fear of U.S. penalties. The administration also faced criticism for its handling of these issues, both from Iran and from political opponents.

== State of Iran–U.S. relations in January 2009 ==
At the outset of the Obama administration in January 2009, Iran was led by President Mahmoud Ahmadinejad, a hardline conservative known for his confrontational rhetoric toward the West and refusal to halt Iran's nuclear program, while ultimate authority rested with Supreme Leader Ali Khamenei, who held decisive power over Iran's foreign and security policies. Relations between Iran and the United States were tense, marked by escalating concerns over Iran's nuclear activities, growing sanctions, and the absence of direct diplomatic ties since 1980.

== Initial outreach and early responses ==
Two days after Barack Obama was elected president in November 2008, Ahmadinejad issued the first congratulatory message to a newly elected American president since 1979: "Iran welcomes basic and fair changes in U.S. policies and conducts. I hope you will prefer real public interests and justice to the never-ending demands of a selfish minority and seize the opportunity to serve people so that you will be remembered with high esteem". In his inaugural speech, President Obama said:

To the Muslim world, we seek a new way forward, based on mutual interest and mutual respect. To those leaders around the globe who seek to sow conflict, or blame their society's ills on the West—know that your people will judge you on what you can build, not what you destroy. To those who cling to power through corruption and deceit and the silencing of dissent, know that you are on the wrong side of history; but that we will extend a hand if you are willing to unclench your fist.

Ahmadinejad issued a list of grievances, including the 1953 coup, support for Saddam Hussein in the Iran–Iraq War, and the Iran Air Flight 655 incident. In March 2009, an official delegation of Hollywood actors and filmmakers met with their Iranian counterparts in Tehran as a symbol of United States–Iran relations, but Javad Shamghadri, the Arts Adviser to Ahmadinejad, rejected it and said, "Representatives of Iran's film industry should only have an official meeting with representatives of the academy and Hollywood if they apologize for the insults and accusations against the Iranian nation during the past 30 years".

On 19 March 2009, the beginning of the festival of Nowruz, Obama spoke to the Iranian people in a video saying, "The United States wants the Islamic Republic of Iran to take its rightful place in the community of nations. You have that right—but it comes with real responsibilities".

== Detentions ==
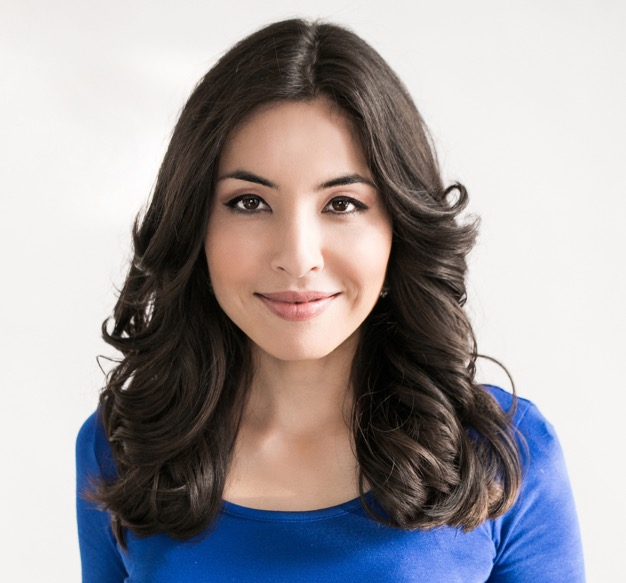
Roxana Saberi

In April 2009, Iranian-American journalist Roxana Saberi was sentenced to eight years in prison after being convicted of spying for the United States. She was accused of possessing a classified document but denied the charge. After spending four months in prison, she was released in May, and the charge was dropped.

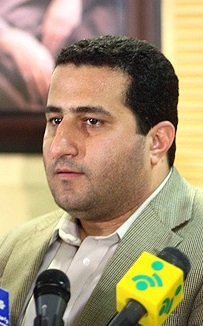
Shahram Amiri

Iranian nuclear scientist Shahram Amiri disappeared from Iran during 2009–2010 in May 2009, and Iran accused the United States of abducting him. On 13 July 2010, the BBC reported that Amiri had taken refuge in the Iranian interests section of Pakistani Embassy Washington, D.C., and sought help to reach Iran. However, after his return to Iran, he was sentenced to ten years in prison and in August 2016 was reported to have been executed for treason.

On July 9, 2009, the United States released five Iranian diplomats (Mohsen Bagheri, Mahmoud Farhadi, Majid Ghaemi, Majid Dagheri and Abbas Jami), who had been held since January 2007. Some analysts believe this was a part of hostage exchange deal between the countries. The U.S. State Department said the release was not part of a deal with Iran but was necessary under an American–Iraqi security pact.

== 2009 Iranian presidential election ==
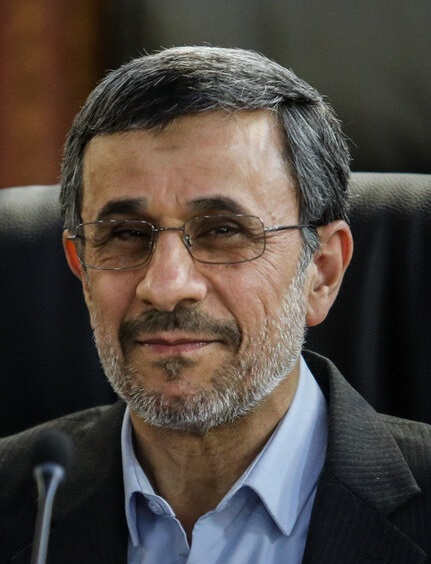
Mahmoud Ahmadinejad

The 2009 Iranian presidential election was held on June 12, 2009. Incumbent President Mahmoud Ahmadinejad faced challengers including Mir-Hossein Mousavi, a former Prime Minister of Iran, and Mehdi Karroubi, a former Speaker of the Iranian Parliament. In the lead-up to the election, some reports suggested that the timing of potential U.S.–Iran talks was influenced by the election.

On the day of the election, President Obama expressed optimism about the "robust debate" in Iran. After Ahmadinejad's controversial landslide victory, allegations of widespread fraud sparked mass protests, later known as the Green Movement. The protests were the largest in Iran since the 1979 revolution. The U.S. response was initially cautious, but as reports of violent crackdowns and voting irregularities emerged, the tone shifted. On June 15, the State Department raised concerns about arrests and irregularities, while U.S. Vice President Joe Biden criticized the suppression of speech.

As the protests grew, Obama condemned the Iranian government's response, stating, "In 2009 no iron fist is strong enough to shut off the world from bearing witness to the peaceful pursuit of justice. Despite the Iranian government's efforts to expel journalists and isolate itself, powerful images and poignant words have made their way to us through cell phones and computers, and so we have watched what the Iranian people are doing." He added: "This is not about the United States and the West. This is about the people of Iran, and the future that they—and only they—will choose." He emphasized that the U.S. respected Iranian sovereignty but said, "I am deeply troubled by the violence that I've been seeing on television. I think that the democratic process—free speech, the ability of people to peacefully dissent—all those are universal values and need to be respected."

After further violence against protesters, Obama issued a stronger condemnation, stating that the U.S. and the international community were: "appalled and outraged by the threats, beatings and imprisonments of the last few days" and issued a strong condemnation of "these unjust actions." Some critics, including his 2012 presidential campaign rival Mitt Romney, argued that Obama should have done more to support the Green Movement. Others disagreed, arguing that direct U.S. support for the Iranian opposition could damage its credibility and reinforce the regime's claim that the movement is a foreign-backed plot threatening Iran's sovereignty.

== Confrontation and coercion ==
=== Stuxnet ===
In 2010, Stuxnet was reportedly found in the Natanz Nuclear Facility. Stuxnet is a malicious computer worm thought to have been in development since at least 2005. Stuxnet targets supervisory control and data acquisition (SCADA) systems and is believed to be responsible for causing substantial damage to the Iran nuclear program. Although neither the United States nor Israel has openly admitted responsibility, multiple independent news organizations claim Stuxnet to be a cyberweapon built jointly by the two countries in a collaborative effort known as Operation Olympic Games. The program, started during the Bush administration, was rapidly expanded within the first months of Barack Obama's presidency. The resulting program eventually produced the computer virus Stuxnet that disabled nearly 1,000 centrifuges at Iran’s Natanz nuclear facility and accidentally spread beyond Iran in 2010. Even after the malware accidentally spread beyond Iran in 2010, Obama authorized continued attacks, judging the operation still effective despite the breach.

=== 2010 Sanctions Act ===
On July 1, 2010, Obama signed the Comprehensive Iran Sanctions, Accountability, and Divestment Act of 2010 (CISADA) as part of the broader campaign to pressure Iran over its nuclear program. CISADA extended the U.S. economic sanctions imposed under the Iran Sanctions Act of 1996, targeting companies and individuals who aid Iran's petroleum sector and aiming to reduce Iranian dependence on gasoline imports. The restrictions in the new law were so stringent that some third countries have warned about interference with their trade. The sanctions have significantly impacted Iran, with its oil exports being halved during this period.

=== Drone incidents ===
On December 4, 2011, an American Lockheed Martin RQ-170 Sentinel UAV, operated by the CIA, was captured by Iranian forces near Kashmar. Iran claimed it seized the drone using cyber warfare, while the U.S. initially stated it had malfunctioned and crashed. Later, the U.S. admitted the drone was intact after Iranian TV aired footage of it. In November 2012, Iranian Su-25 jets fired on a U.S. drone over international waters and pursued it before returning to base. In March 2013, an Iranian F-4 jet also pursued a U.S. MQ-1 drone, but was warned off by U.S. fighter jets.

=== Strait of Hormuz dispute ===
In late December 2011, Iranian navy chief Admiral Habibollah Sayyari was reported to have said that it would be "very easy" for Iran to close the Straits of Hormuz. On 3 January 2012 Iran's army chief Ataollah Salehi warned "We recommend to the American warship that passed through the Strait of Hormuz and went to Gulf of Oman not to return to the Persian Gulf". However, this was later denied by the Defense Minister of Iran. The warship is believed to be the American aircraft carrier USS John C. Stennis which recently vacated the area as Iran conducted a 10-day naval exercise near the Strait of Hormuz. Salehi was also quoted as saying "We have no plan to begin any irrational act but we are ready against any threat." The U.S. Navy responded that it will continue with its regularly scheduled deployments, in accordance with international maritime conventions.

In 2012, the United States Navy was warned that Iran was preparing suicide attack boats and was building up its naval forces in the Gulf region. At a briefing in Bahrain, Vice Admiral Mark Fox told reporters the U.S. Navy's Fifth Fleet could prevent Iran from blocking the Strait of Hormuz.

The actual ability of Iran to close the strait has been questioned by experts, with estimates of the time that Iran would be able to sustain the closure ranging from a few days to over a hundred days.

== Attempts at rapprochement ==
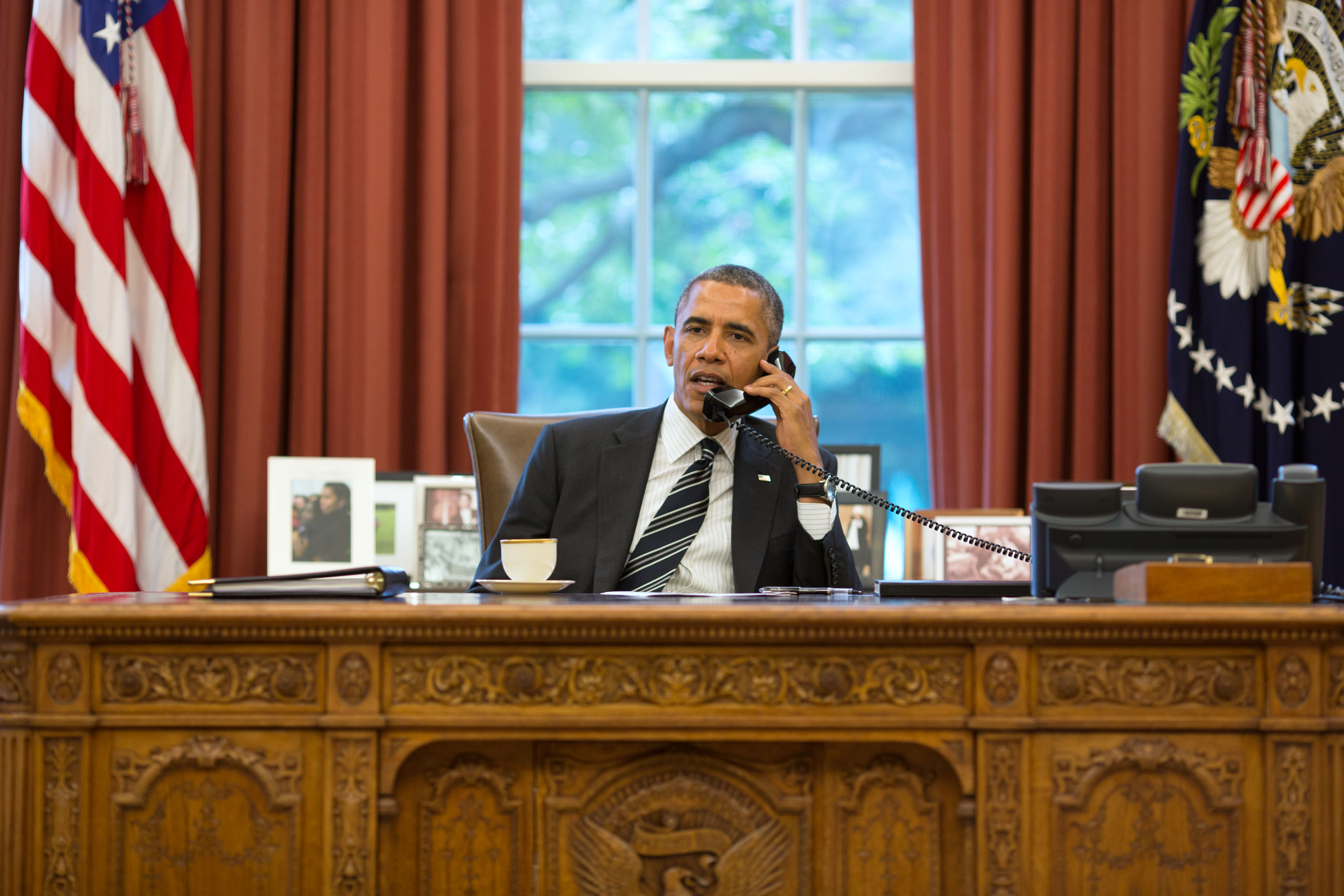
Barack Obama speaking with Hassan Rouhani on 27 September 2013

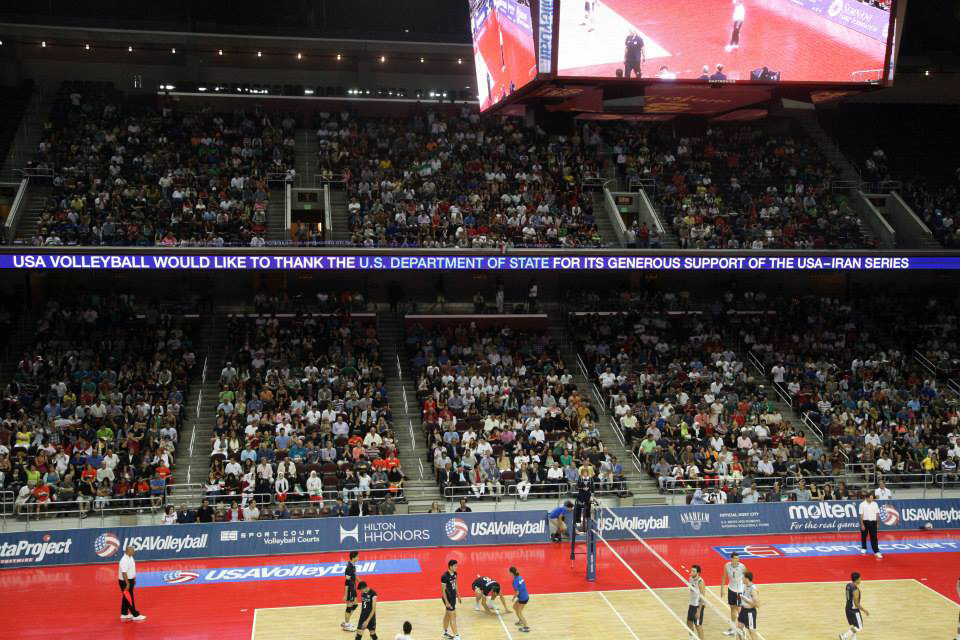
The United States men's national volleyball team plays the Iran men's national volleyball team in the first of four friendly matches, held with support from the U.S. Department of State in Los Angeles, on 9 August 2014.

Hassan Rouhani, a former nuclear negotiator and cleric seen as a political moderate, was elected president of Iran in June 2013 on a platform promising greater engagement with the international community and relief from economic sanctions. His visit to New York City to address the United Nations General Assembly in September 2013 was hailed as progress in the countries′ relationship. His television interviews and public addresses while in the U.S. were seen as an effort to convey the message Iran posed no threat and that he was ready to do business with the West. The Obama administration had in turn made a symbolic gesture by making the first official U.S. acknowledgement of the CIA's role in the ousting of Iran's democratically elected government of Mohammad Mosaddegh. Obama requested a bilateral meeting with Rouhani, which didn't take place; Rouhani later explained that more time was needed to organize a proper meeting given the two countries’ troubled history.

On 26 September, Iran and the U.S. held their first substantive high-level meeting since the 1979 revolution at multilateral talks that involved the U.S. secretary of state, John Kerry, and the Iranian foreign minister, Mohammad Javad Zarif, the meeting being chaired by the EU foreign policy chief, Catherine Ashton. The rare get-together was groundbreaking, according to Iranian analysts.

The following day, Rouhani and Obama spoke by telephone, the two countries' highest political exchange since 1979. The call led to protests by Iranian conservatives who chanted "death to America" when Rouhani returned to Tehran. On the 34th anniversary of the embassy siege, tens of thousands of supporters of a more hardline approach to relations gathered at the site of the former U.S. embassy to denounce rapprochement. It was the largest such gathering in recent years. Conversely, a majority of Iranian citizens saw the progression of peace talks with the United States as a sign of hope for a future of an alliance between the two nations.

In 2014, the United States and Iran began unofficial limited cooperation in the fight against the terrorist organization Islamic State in Iraq and the Levant (ISIL).

In February 2015, former Congressman Jim Slattery claimed to have visited Iran in December 2014 from an invitation by the Iranian government where he attended the World Against Violence and Extremism conference making him the first American lawmaker to visit the country after the Iranian Revolution. He claimed to have met with President Rouhani stating that Rouhani was "deeply committed to improving this relationship with the United States". The visit came at a time during negotiations leading to the JCPOA.

On 28 September 2015, an unplanned and "accidental" encounter between U.S. President Barack Obama and Iranian Minister of Foreign Affairs Javad Zarif occurred on the sidelines of a luncheon at the United Nations General Assembly, with the two men reportedly shaking hands. It was the first handshake between a U.S. president and a top Iranian diplomat since the 1979 Islamic Revolution. U.S. Secretary of State John Kerry, who was present, also introduced Obama to two senior Iranian officials also involved in the JCPOA nuclear negotiations. The exchange was originally reported in Iranian media and was said to have lasted "less than a minute"; it was immediately condemned by conservative Iranian MP Mansour Haghighatpour, a member of the committee on national security and foreign policy, who called for Zarif to publicly apologize.

== Iran nuclear deal (JCPOA) ==
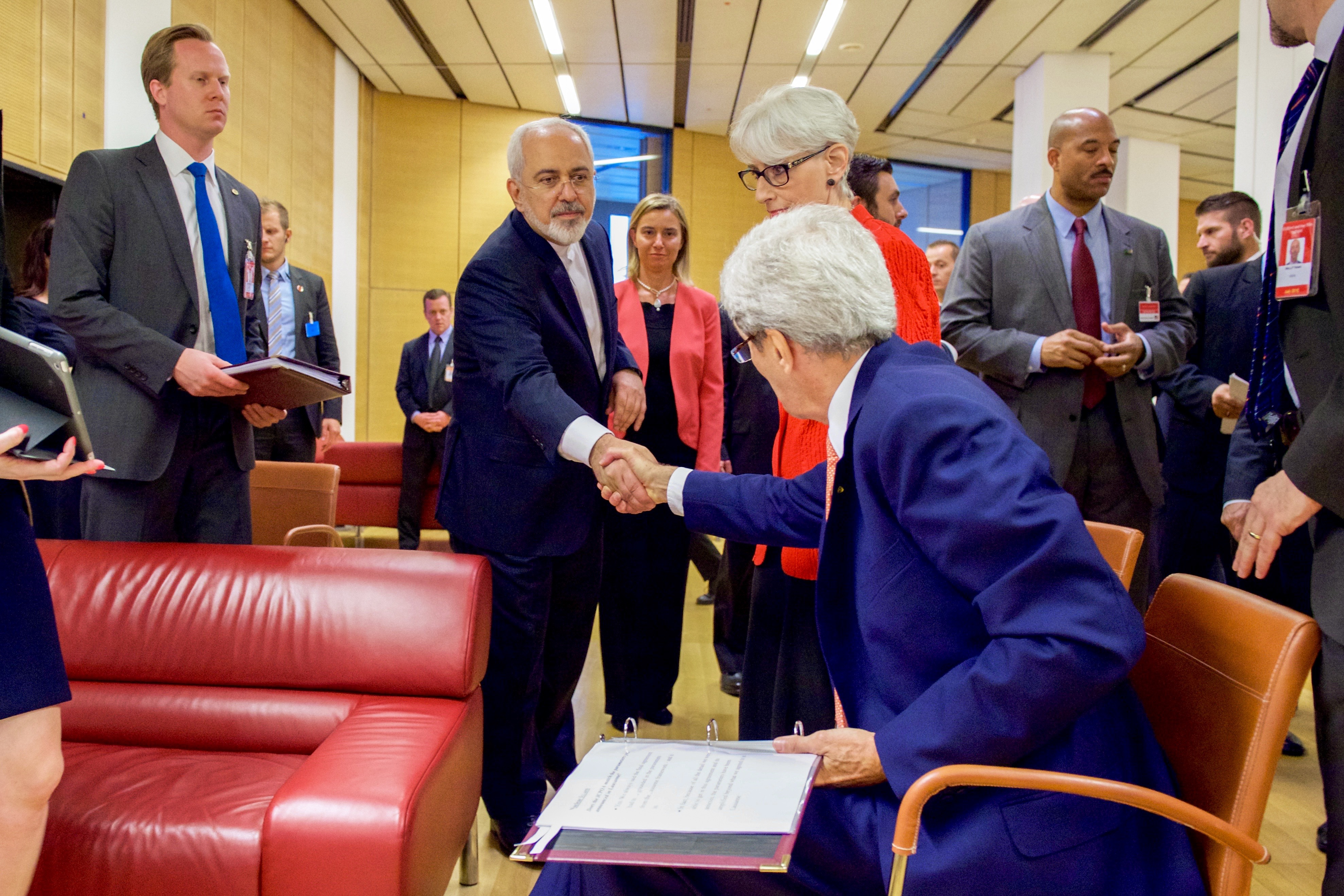
American and Iranian foreign affairs ministers shaking hands at the end of successful negotiations about future of Iran nuclear program, Vienna

In late 2009, the United States moved forward with a nuclear weapons production program initiated under the Bush administration. Known as the “Complex Modernization” initiative, the plan aimed to expand two nuclear facilities to produce new bomb components—specifically, new plutonium pits at the Los Alamos laboratory in New Mexico and enhanced enriched uranium processing at the Y-12 plant in Oak Ridge, Tennessee.

After several rounds of negotiations, on 24 November 2013, the Geneva interim agreement, officially titled the Joint Plan of Action, was signed between Iran and several countries including the U.S. It consisted of a short-term freeze of portions of Iran's nuclear program in exchange for decreased economic sanctions on Iran, as the countries work towards a long-term agreement. Implementation of the agreement began 20 January 2014.

President Obama announces an agreement on the Iran nuclear deal, July 14, 2015.

On 14 July 2015, the Joint Comprehensive Plan of Action (JCPOA, or the Iran deal) was agreed upon between Iran and a group of world powers: the P5+1 (the permanent members of the United Nations Security Council—the United States, the United Kingdom, Russia, France, and China—plus Germany) and the European Union. The Obama administration agreed to lift sanctions on Iran that had devastated their economy for years, in return Iran promised to give up their nuclear capabilities and allow workers from the UN to do facility checks whenever they so please. President Obama urged U.S. Congress to support the nuclear deal reminding politicians that were wary that if the deal fell through, the U.S. would reinstate their sanctions on Iran. Still, the lawmakers had a negative approach towards Iran, viewing it as a security threat to the U.S., its allies, and the international community, in line with existing stereotypical depictions of the country.

Following the deal, the U.S. supported a UN Security Council resolution that endorsed the JCPOA—the United Nations Security Council Resolution 2231 of 20 July 2015. The resolution welcomed "Iran's reaffirmation in the JCPOA that it will under no circumstances ever seek, develop or acquire any nuclear weapons".

The JCPOA received a mixed international reaction. Many countries expressed praise or hope it could achieve the denuclearization of Iran, while Iranian adversaries in the Middle East, including Israel and Saudi Arabia, were negative. Israeli Prime Minister Benjamin Netanyahu called the agreement a historic mistake for the world. "Iran is going to receive a sure path to nuclear weapons," he said.

In the U.S., the Iran deal was met with almost unanimous derision and denunciation by conservatives in the United States. Within days of the finalization of the deal, all Republican Party candidates for president in the 2016 election had issued a public statement criticizing the deal in one form or another. Public opinion in the United States on the deal shifted over time. In 2015, a clear majority supported negotiations and lifting sanctions in exchange for nuclear limits, with The Washington Post reporting a 2-to-1 margin in favor. Early surveys also showed majority support for honoring international agreements. However, by 2016 and 2017, support had declined: Gallup found only 30% approval in 2016, with 57% disapproval, and a 2017 poll by Lobe Log reported similar figures, indicating sustained opposition.

In January 2016, shortly after the JCPOA took effect, the United States and Iran resolved a long-standing financial dispute stemming from a 1979 arms deal that was canceled following the Iranian Revolution. The U.S. agreed to pay Iran $1.7 billion: $400 million in principal and $1.3 billion in interest. According to the Obama administration, the payment was made in cash due to sanctions that restricted conventional banking channels. While critics, particularly in the Republican Party, characterized the payment as a "ransom" for hostages, the White House stated that the timing coincided with the JCPOA implementation but was part of a separate legal settlement under the Hague Tribunal.

=== Project Cassandra ===
Project Cassandra was a U.S. Drug Enforcement Administration (DEA) initiative launched in 2008 to disrupt Hezbollah's funding networks by targeting its involvement in international drug trafficking and money laundering. While the operation uncovered significant links between Hezbollah and organized crime, its later years were marked by controversy over allegations that enforcement efforts were slowed to protect the JCPOA negotiations with Iran—a claim disputed by former officials.

== U.S.–Iran naval incident ==
On January 12, 2016, two United States Navy riverine command boats were seized by Iran's Islamic Revolutionary Guard Corps (IRGC) Navy after they entered Iranian territorial waters near Iran's Farsi Island in the Persian Gulf. Initially, the U.S. military claimed the sailors inadvertently entered Iranian waters owing to mechanical failure, but it was later reported that they entered Iranian waters because of navigational errors.

U.S. Secretary of State John Kerry called Iranian foreign minister Mohammad Javad Zarif within five minutes, the first of a series of phone calls between the two. The sailors had a brief verbal exchange with the Iranian military and were released, unharmed, 15 hours later.

The release was hailed by the Obama administration as an unintended benefit of the new diplomatic relationship. Iran released pictures of captured U.S. sailors. Some U.S. Republican 2016 presidential candidates such as Ted Cruz, Marco Rubio, and Donald Trump criticized the U.S. response to the detention, which they deemed too weak.

== Continued tensions ==
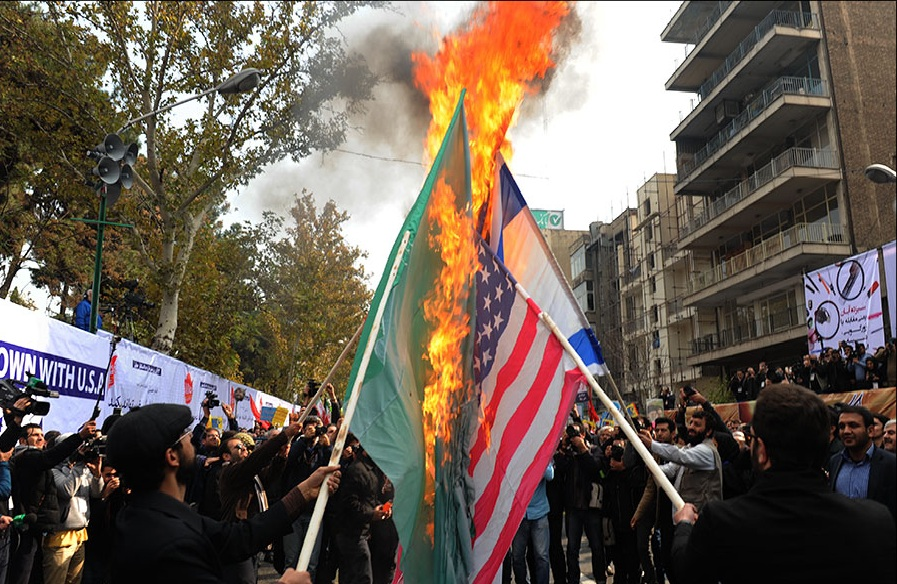
A protest in Tehran on 4 November 2015, against the United States, Israel, and Saudi Arabia

Although the JCPOA removed sanctions tied to Iran's nuclear program, the United States continued to enforce sanctions concerning human rights violations, support for terrorism, and ballistic missile activities. Iran frequently criticized this dual-track approach as undermining the spirit of the agreement, even if not in legal violation, and cited it as evidence of bad faith. Additionally, European banks and corporations were hesitant to engage with Iran due to the risk of U.S. secondary sanctions, which discouraged financial and commercial transactions despite the lifting of nuclear-related sanctions.

During this period, the United States backed the People's Mojahedin Organization of Iran (MEK), an exiled opposition group that had once allied with Saddam Hussein during the Iran–Iraq War and was delisted as a terrorist organization by the U.S. in 2012. The MEK received public support from several high-profile American politicians and was promoted by some as a viable alternative to Iran's current leadership.

On 8 and 9 March 2016 the IRGC conducted ballistic missile tests as part of its military drills, with one of the Qadr H missiles carrying the inscription, "Israel should be wiped off the Earth." Israel called on Western powers to punish Iran for the tests, which U.S. officials said did not violate the nuclear deal but might violate United Nations Security Council Resolution 2231. Iranian Foreign Minister Mohammad Javad Zarif insisted that the tests were not in violation of the UNSC resolution. On 17 March the U.S. Treasury Department sanctioned Iranian and British companies for involvement in the Iranian ballistic missile program.

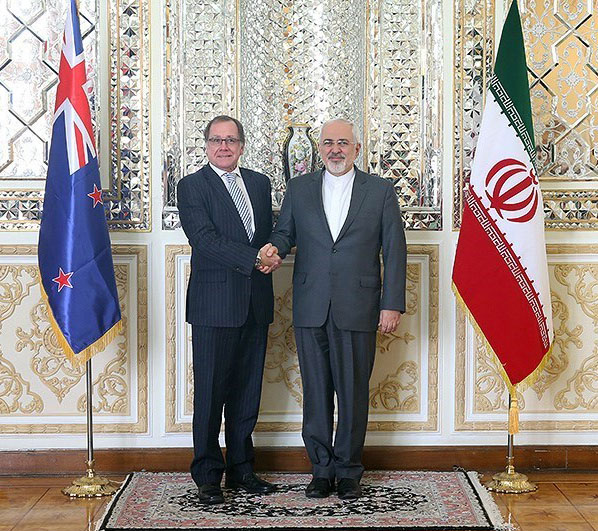
New Zealand and Iranian foreign affairs ministers McCully and Zarif meeting in Tehran

On 21 May 2016 Zarif, during a meeting with his New Zealander counterpart Murray McCully, while statements of support (like those from the U.S.) are politically helpful, they are not sufficient unless matched by action—especially to resolve obstacles created by years of sanctions and U.S. hostility.

=== US Supreme Court decision about frozen Iranian assets ===
In parallel with ongoing sanctions and legal disputes, tensions also extended into the judiciary. In April 2016, the U.S. Supreme Court ruled that Iran must pay nearly $2 billion to victims of the 1983 Beirut barracks bombings. Although U.S. troops generally have no legal right to sue under combat rules, the judge determined they were on a peacekeeping mission under peacetime rules of engagement. As a result, survivors and family members were allowed to sue Iran under a 1996 law permitting U.S. citizens to take legal action against nations that sponsor terrorism.

== Proxy confrontations in Syria and Yemen ==
Meanwhile, Iran and the United States engaged in indirect military confrontation during the Arab Spring, primarily in Syria following an uprising against the pro-Iranian dictator Bashar al-Assad, with both sides supporting opposing factions. Iran backed al-Assad through proxy forces, viewing his regime as vital to its regional interests. The U.S., Turkey, Qatar, and Saudi Arabia supported the uprising, with the latter three funding revolutionary groups. As the conflict escalated into a broader civil war, it evolved into a proxy struggle between Russia and the United States, with Russia largely supporting Iranian efforts in Syria to contain rebels. Iran, Russia, and Syria, alongside Hezbollah and Iraq, formed a military coalition, which was viewed by the U.S. as an attempt by said countries to antagonize the West.

Iran and the U.S. also engaged in proxy warfare in Yemen, where the U.S. supported the Saudi Arabian–led intervention in Yemen. The U.S. officially intervened in October 2016 after the Houthis attacked a United States Navy ship. Iran has supported the rebel Houthis, while the Saudi coalition supported the government of Abdrabbuh Mansur Hadi.

== See also ==
- Foreign relations of Iran
- Foreign policy of the Obama administration
- Iran–United States relations during the George W. Bush administration
- Iran–United States relations during the first Trump administration
- Iran–United States relations during the Biden administration
- Iran–United States relations during the second Trump administration
- Views on military action against Iran
