= U-turn (banking) =

Type of international financial transaction

A U-turn transaction, generally speaking, is a banned financial transaction performed by a bank in country A (e.g., the United States) for the benefit of a bank in country B (e.g., Iran) through an offshore bank in a third country (e.g., Switzerland). This loophole is used especially by Iranian banks to avoid U.S. sanctions against their US dollar-based transactions.

The phrase "U-turn" comes from the reversal-style process of transferring funds to a U.S. bank and then instantly returning the amount of money as dollars to a European bank.
