= Criticism of the Iran nuclear deal =

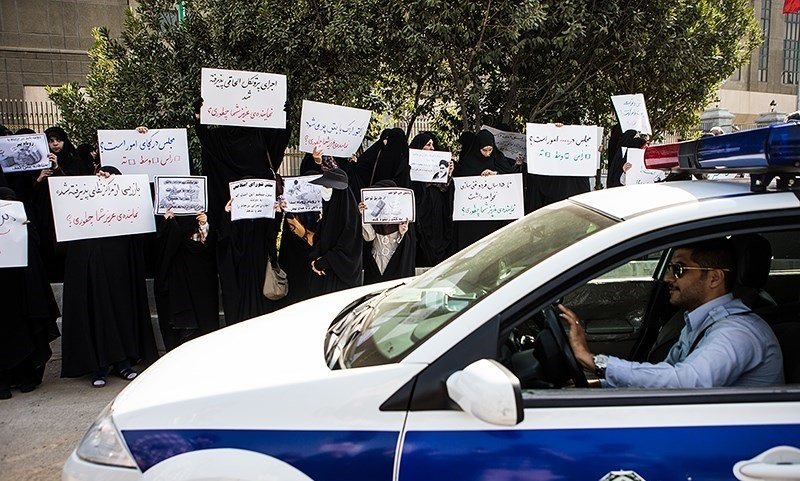
Basij women protest the JCPOA outside the Iranian parliament

The Iran nuclear deal, also known as the Joint Comprehensive Plan of Action officially, was the international agreement reached on Iran's nuclear program in Vienna in 2015. The deal, made after several years of negotiation, set in place strict guidelines to regulate and oversee the Iranian nuclear program including the reduction of centrifuges, enriched uranium stockpiles, and an agreement to allow regular inspections of nuclear sites, among other aspects. The deal has attracted enormous criticism by certain political and media elements in the United States and Iran as the deal is viewed as conciliatory in nature by some factions in both countries. For example, President Donald J. Trump called the Iran deal, "the worst deal ever negotiated" and United States Senate Majority Leader Mitch McConnell characterized it as "flawed", while hardliners in Iran have indicated a desire to subvert it. Much of the criticism in the United States has been centered on the issue of appeasement and Iran's compliance, while in Iran many of the criticisms revolve around the issue of sovereignty and non-nuclear restrictions.

In Iran, debate over the deal has become representative of a number of persisting social, economic, and political conflicts that have played a large role in the rift between moderates, reformists, and conservatives. In the United States, the deal is seen as a symbol in the battle between competing visions on how the United States should carry out its foreign policy in the Middle East.

== Background and content ==
Negotiation on Iran's nuclear program between the international community and Iran have occurred on and off since 2006, however the negotiations that led to the 2015 framework agreement, and the eventual final agreement, began in March 2013. These talks, spearheaded by State Department officials Jake Sullivan and William J. Burns, were conducted with an Iranian delegation led by Iranian Deputy Foreign Minister Ali Asghar Khaji. The initial meetings were largely fruitless but June 2013 saw the election of Hassan Rouhani, a centrist and reformist from the Moderation and Development Party. Rouhani had previously served as Secretary of the Supreme National Security Council and as such had been Iran's lead nuclear negotiator as recently as 2005. At his inauguration in August 2013 and during a phone call with President Obama in September 2013, Rouhani relayed his intent to restart negotiations with the West on the nuclear issue. By November 2013, the P5+1 countries and Iran reached a pact known as the Joint Plan of Action. This interim agreement was signed in Geneva and included provisions that limited Iran's use of enriched uranium, restricted the installation of new centrifuges, and allowed IAEA supervision of several Iranian nuclear sites, all in exchange for modest sanctions relief by the United States. The plan was slated to go into effect in January 2014.

Further negotiations between P5+1 and Iran took place over the course of 2014 in pursuit of a more comprehensive deal. In June 2014, the deadline to meet the goal of a comprehensive agreement was not met and the deadline was therefore extended to November 2014. After the goal of November 2014 was not met, another extension was made to June 2015.

In April 2015, the negotiations produced a framework deal which included provisions for intensified inspections by the IAEA, and increased restrictions on the nuclear program. The details of the plan were not worked out until negotiations of the plan concluded three months later. Talks over the specifics of the framework deal were carried out over the course of these three months primarily between U.S. Secretary of State John Kerry and Iranian Foreign Minister Mohammad Javad Zarif with the other foreign ministers of P5+1 also taking part. On 14 July 2015, after seventeen days of near uninterrupted negotiations and a deadline extension, P5+1 and Iran reached a finalized agreement, the Joint Comprehensive Plan of Action.

As of 2018, IAEA inspectors spent 3,000 calendar days per year in Iran, installing tamper-proof seals and collecting surveillance camera photos, measurement data and documents. IAEA representatives asserted (e.g. in March 2018) that they have verified that Iran is implementing its nuclear-related commitments.

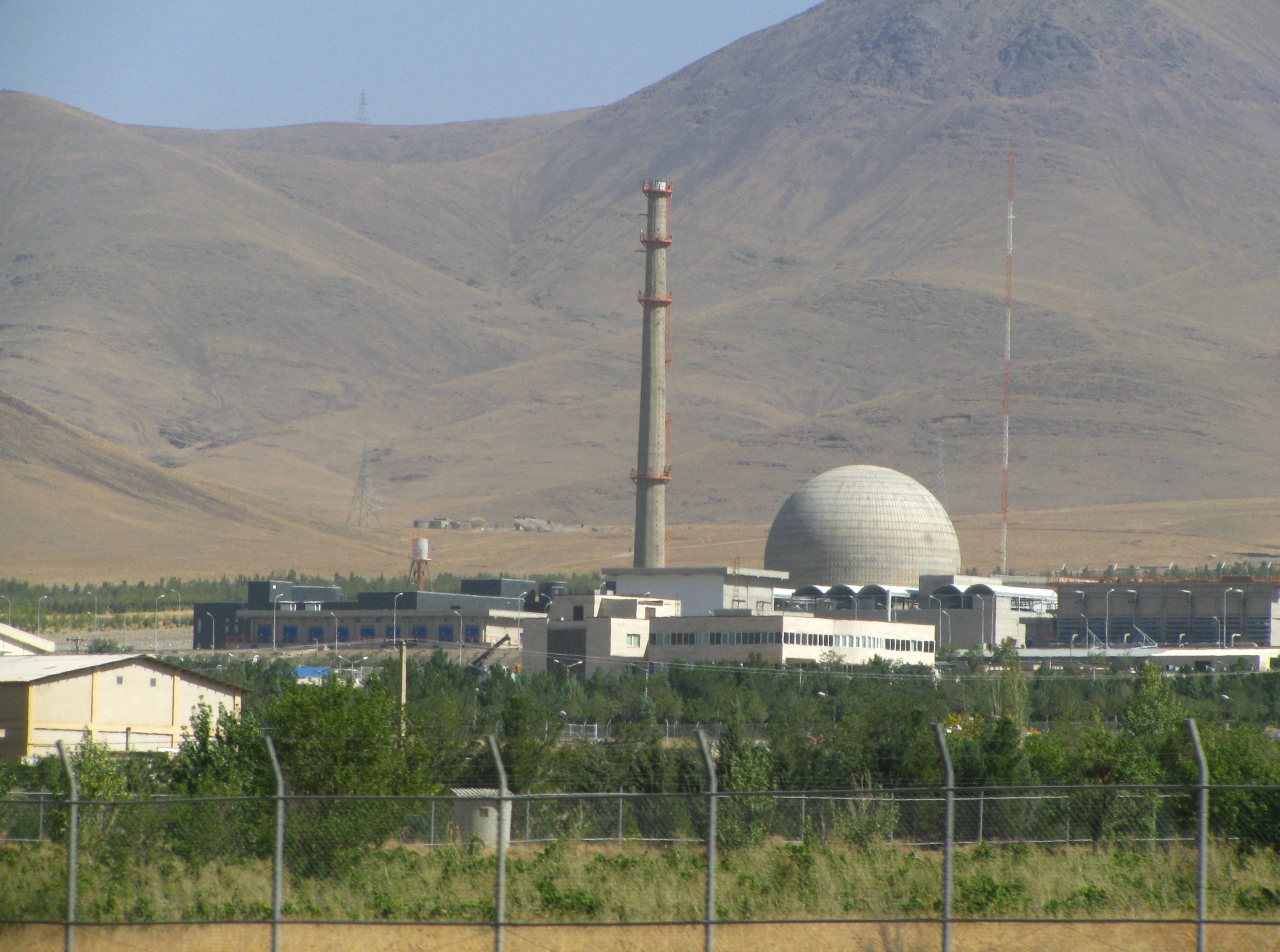
Arak heavy water plant

=== Key provisions ===
- Reduction of Iran's stockpile of enriched uranium by 98%, from 10,000 kilograms to 300 kilograms, to be maintained over fifteen years. Remaining uranium will only be authorized to be enriched to 3.67%, the level adequate enough for use in civilian nuclear power and research. Existing enriched uranium above the 3.67% mark will be sold or diluted. All research and development into enriched uranium is limited for a period of eight years and may only be conducted at the Natanz nuclear facility in Isfahan Province, Iran.
- An exhaustive system of inspections by international observers from the IAEA will be put in place. This system will include a continuous monitoring of all aspects of Iran's nuclear supply chain such as uranium mills, observation by infrared satellites, fiber optic seals on equipment, sensors, and surveillance cameras. Dedicated IAEA inspectors for Iran, will triple from 50 to 150. IAEA inspectors also have the ability to request physical access to sites if specific concerns of non-compliance arise.
- Iran will cut down on the number of operational centrifuges. Of its 19,000 centrifuges, all but 6,104 will be put in storage with an even smaller amount allowed to enrich uranium for a period of ten years. All of the stored centrifuges must be held at the Natanz site under IAEA supervision.
- Iran is forbidden from constructing additional heavy water sites or accumulating additional heavy water for a period of fifteen years. Iran's existing Arak heavy water reactor site will be forbidden from producing power above 20 MWth (megawatt thermal) and will undergo a redesign to limit its capability to produce weapons grade plutonium. All heavy water in Iran's possession that exceeds the limitations of the deal will be placed for sale on the international market.
- Iran will not participate in spent fuel reprocessing in any capacity for a period of fifteen years and all spent fuel in Iran will be shipped out of the country.
- The Fordow Fuel Enrichment Plant will be forbidden from holding fissile material. Of the 2,700 IR-1 centrifuges currently installed at Fordow, only 1,044 will be allowed to remain. Enriching of uranium at the site will also be heavily restricted.
- A "snapback" mechanism that automatically replaces all international sanctions on Iran if compliance of the agreement is not met.

== Controversial features ==
=== Sanctions relief ===
The lifting of economic and military sanctions on Iran led to much ire among conservatives and some liberals in the United States who viewed the move as detrimental to security in the region. The value of the money frozen in foreign banks that would become available to Iran upon the deal's implementation was estimated to be between $29 billion and $150 billion. Money that, critics claim, would lead to increasing expenditures on Iran's military capability and a financial boost to proxy groups in the region such as Hezbollah in Lebanon and Houthi rebels in Yemen. The billions of dollars Iran would have access to was assailed as a "signing bonus" by some critics. However, the Department of Treasury estimated that Iran's liquid assets after the sanctions relief would be only $50 billion, most of which would not go to military activities because of Iran's dire need for foreign reserves.

=== Effect on Israel ===
Shortly after the announcement of the deal, critics within the Republican Party and the Israel lobby in the United States lambasted the move as a rebuff to Israel and a blatant undermining of Israel-United States relations. In addition, the deal was characterized as a threat to Israel's national security on the basis that it would to lead to an empowerment of anti-Israel actors in the region and the deal would actually facilitate Iran's nuclear program rather than hamper it. Senator Tom Cotton (R-AR) visited Israel and met with Israeli Prime Minister Benjamin Netanyahu shortly after the announcement of the deal and vocalized his commitment to Israel. Prior to the visit, Cotton has said his solution to Iran's nuclear program would be a "credible threat of military force".

Benjamin Netanyahu, who called the Iran nuclear deal a "historic mistake", told President Barack Obama that Israel was under increased threat because of the deal and said in a statement, "In the coming decade, the deal will reward Iran, the terrorist regime in Tehran, with hundreds of billions of dollars. This cash bonanza will fuel Iran’s terrorism worldwide, its aggression in the region and its efforts to destroy Israel, which are ongoing." Many conservatives in the United States claimed the deal would usher a financial windfall for Iranian sponsored groups in the Middle East that pose a threat to Israel including Hezbollah and Hamas. In addition the lack of focus on Iran's ballistic missile program and the lifting of weapons embargoes was also viewed as a peril for Israel. President Donald Trump criticized what he viewed as the deal's "near total silence on Iran's missile programs."

=== Inspection regime ===
Under the deal, international monitors are authorized to monitor declared Iranian nuclear sites through numerous electronic means including but not limited to: fiber-optic seals, cameras, sensors that detect radioactive particles, and commercial satellite imagery. President Obama said that IAEA inspectors would have "24/7 access" to Iran's "key nuclear facilities". Critics claimed that the inspection regime would not provide sufficient access to Iran's military sites. IAEA inspectors may request access to these sites if genuine concerns of non-compliance arise but it can take up to 24 days to resolve a dispute over an access request. Critics say this provision means that Iran would be able to covertly advance its nuclear ambitions while still abiding by the deal. Ali Vaez, Iran Project Director at the International Crisis Group, said the deal ensured the international community had "better access to Iran's military sites" than ever before.

== Opposition in Iran ==
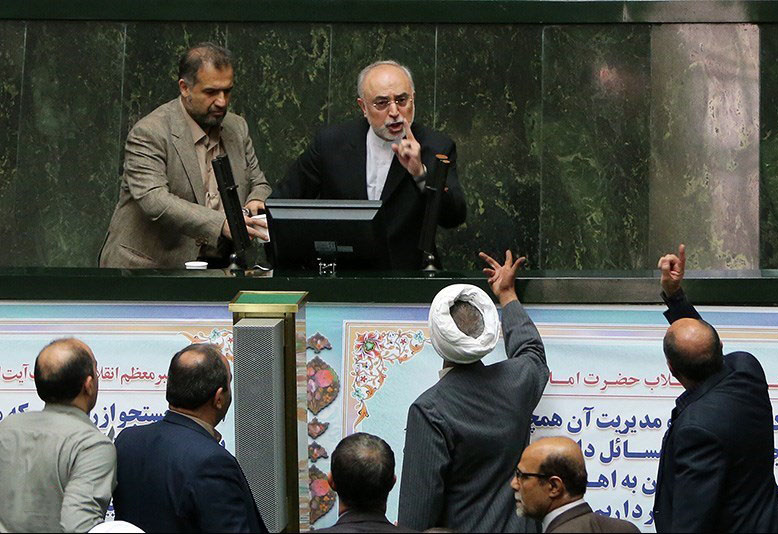
Ali Akbar Salehi, head of Iran's atomic energy agency, is heckled by anti-JCPOA members of the Islamic Consultative Assembly.

Iran was less bitterly divided over the deal than the United States but opposition in the form of hardliners, especially in more conservative religious institutions such as the Islamic Revolutionary Guard Corps still existed. These hardliners are concentrated more in Iran's unelected governmental institutions such as the aforementioned Revolutionary Guards, the Basij, the Assembly of Experts, and the Guardian Council. These bodies wield immense power in the Islamic Republic and are composed largely of clerical elites and religious reactionaries who bitterly oppose the West and Western ideals. Those more open to the deal included Iran's centrists and reformists who are characterized by a greater openness to foreign cultures, secularization, and economic globalization. The JCPOA created a rift at the highest levels of government as evidenced by a leaked government directive to media outlets which urged them to praise the deal and its negotiators and avoid criticism.

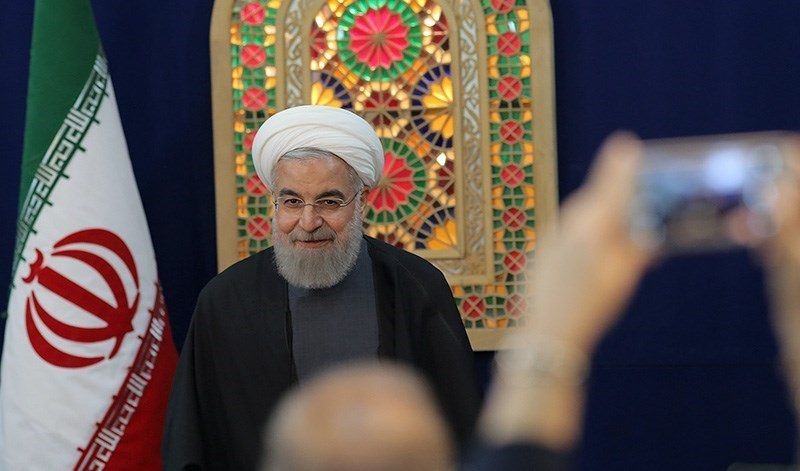
President Hassan Rouhani

Iranian president Hassan Rouhani, who in many ways paved the way for the deal, said the alternative to the deal was an "economic Stone Age" brought on by sanctions and economic isolation. He also chastised the Revolutionary Guard Corps for its opposition. Supreme Leader Ali Khamenei gave his tacit approval of the deal and characterized it as a win for Iran exclaiming, "After 12 years of struggling with the Islamic republic, the result is that they have to bear the turning of thousands of centrifuges in the country", a move that is likely to quell the resistance of the country's hardliner factions.

Hardliners were against the deal for a variety of the reasons, notably their desire to turn Iran into a nuclear armed state in order to deter the United States and Israel, its violations of the Ayatollah Khamenei's red lines, and their belief that international inspections are a front for American intelligence-gathering. Unofficially, members of the Revolutionary Guard worry that opening Iran up to global trade with the removal of sanctions will impede the organization's profits. The Revolutionary Guard Corps is believed to control a third of Iran's economy, a staggeringly high figure that could be reduced with more international commerce. Economic liberalization brought on by the deal could loosen the IRGC's control of the economy and lead to fresh resentment within the organization. In addition, the removal of U.S. sanctions also denies the Guard Corps from using the United States, or the West for that matter, as a propaganda tool and scapegoat for Iran's domestic problems.

One of the most prominent opponents of the JCPOA in Iran was the former Secretary of the Supreme National Security Council Saeed Jalili who lambasted the deal and its negotiators for having offered too many concessions to American negotiators. Jalili claimed the nuclear deal "violated Iran's independence and national sovereignty."

Media in Iran was also divided on partisan lines as well, with conservative newspapers such as the Kayhan newspaper and Ettelaat newspaper publishing articles that opposed the deal.

In many ways, the battle over the JCPOA is a proxy conflict in the overarching debate over the future of Iran. The factions of the Iranian political spectrum who support the deal are the same faction who support globalization, less religious influence in government, and a moderate foreign policy while those who oppose the deal are the same faction that advocate for a more religiously conservative society, the "resistance economy", and more military intervention abroad. Nevertheless, the Iranian parliament approved the Iran deal 161-59-13 sending it to the Guardian Council which passed it with a "strong majority".

=== Challenges ===
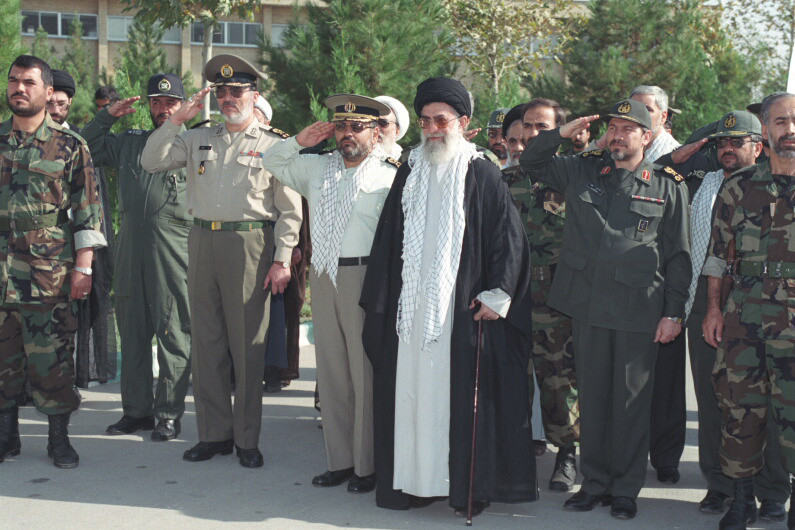
Ali Khamenei with members of the Revolutionary Guard Corps.

Outside of conservative political backlash there still remains a great litany of economic, social, and military challenges to the implementation of the Iran nuclear deal within Iran itself. Much of the popular support for the Iran deal comes from the public's perception of economic upsurges as a result of the sanctions relief brought on by the JCPOA. If the Iranian economy continues to remain stagnated, and foreign investment remains low, it is likely the public will turn away from the nuclear deal since it did not bring the level of economic relief that many Iranians banked their support of the deal on. This is evidenced by the 13% drop in approval of the deal among Iranians in the year after the deal was reached. Even after the implementation of the JCPOA many foreign investors have remained weary of Iran. Decades of global economic isolation have strengthened the "economy of resistance", or the self-sufficient economy developed under sanctions, and as a result many businesses are actually front companies for or directly linked to the Islamic Revolutionary Guard Corps. Other aspects that have hampered foreign direct investment in the wake of the Iran deal include high levels of corruption and the arrest of foreigners suspected of espionage. Insufficient economic growth will almost assuredly impede the reformist presidency of Hassan Rouhani and lead to conservative gains that can further impede the JCPOA.

Iran's increasing military involvement in the Middle East may also present a challenge to the deal. The regional conflict between Sunni and Shiite proxy groups aggravates tensions between the region's powers and motivates Iran to "demonstrate its resolve" for the purpose of domestic audiences. The conflicts that arise as a result can lead to greater confrontation between the United States and Iran which can undermine the deal.

== Opposition in the United States ==
=== Political opposition ===
The Iran deal was met with almost unanimous derision and denunciation by conservatives in the United States. Within days of the finalization of the deal, all Republican Party candidates for president in the 2016 election had issued a public statement criticizing the deal in one form or another. U.S. Senator from South Carolina and Republican candidate, Lindsey Graham called it a, "terrible deal" and a "death sentence for Israel." A statement from former Florida governor Jeb Bush said, "The nuclear agreement announced by the Obama administration today is a dangerous, deeply flawed, and short sighted deal." Ben Carson called it a "historic mistake" while former Arkansas governor Mike Huckabee lambasted John Kerry for not standing strongly enough with Israel. New Jersey governor Chris Christie said "The deal threatens Israel, it threatens the United States, and it turns 70 years of nuclear policy on its head."

In the United States Congress, disparagement was equally fierce. Speaker of the House John Boehner told reporters in a briefing he thought it was a "bad deal" but added he did not have all the details so he couldn't make a definitive statement. Boehner later said he would "do everything" in his power to block the deal. The U.S. Senate Majority Leader Mitch McConnell accused the Obama administration of approaching the talks with a "flawed perspective" that prioritized Iran's interests over the "national goal" of Iranian nuclear disarmament.

Bob Corker, U.S. Senator from Tennessee and chairman of the Senate Foreign Relations Committee claimed it offered too many concessions to Iran and echoed other Republican leaders in describing it as counterproductive. Richard Burr, U.S. Senator from North Carolina and chairman of the Senate Intelligence Committee called it "dangerously limited" and criticized President Obama for "mischaracterizing" the threat Iran poses to the United States.

Representative Louie Gohmert of Texas's 1st congressional district, who called the Iran deal a "move towards a nuclear holocaust", introduced a resolution into the U.S. House of Representatives that would classify the Iran nuclear deal as a treaty which, if passed, would require the Senate to vote on it. As it stands the Iran deal was made as an executive agreement. Gohmert said he would leave Congress if the resolution was passed. Representative Steve King of Iowa's 4th congressional district, said in a Fox News interview that the deal "means tens of millions of lives down the road."

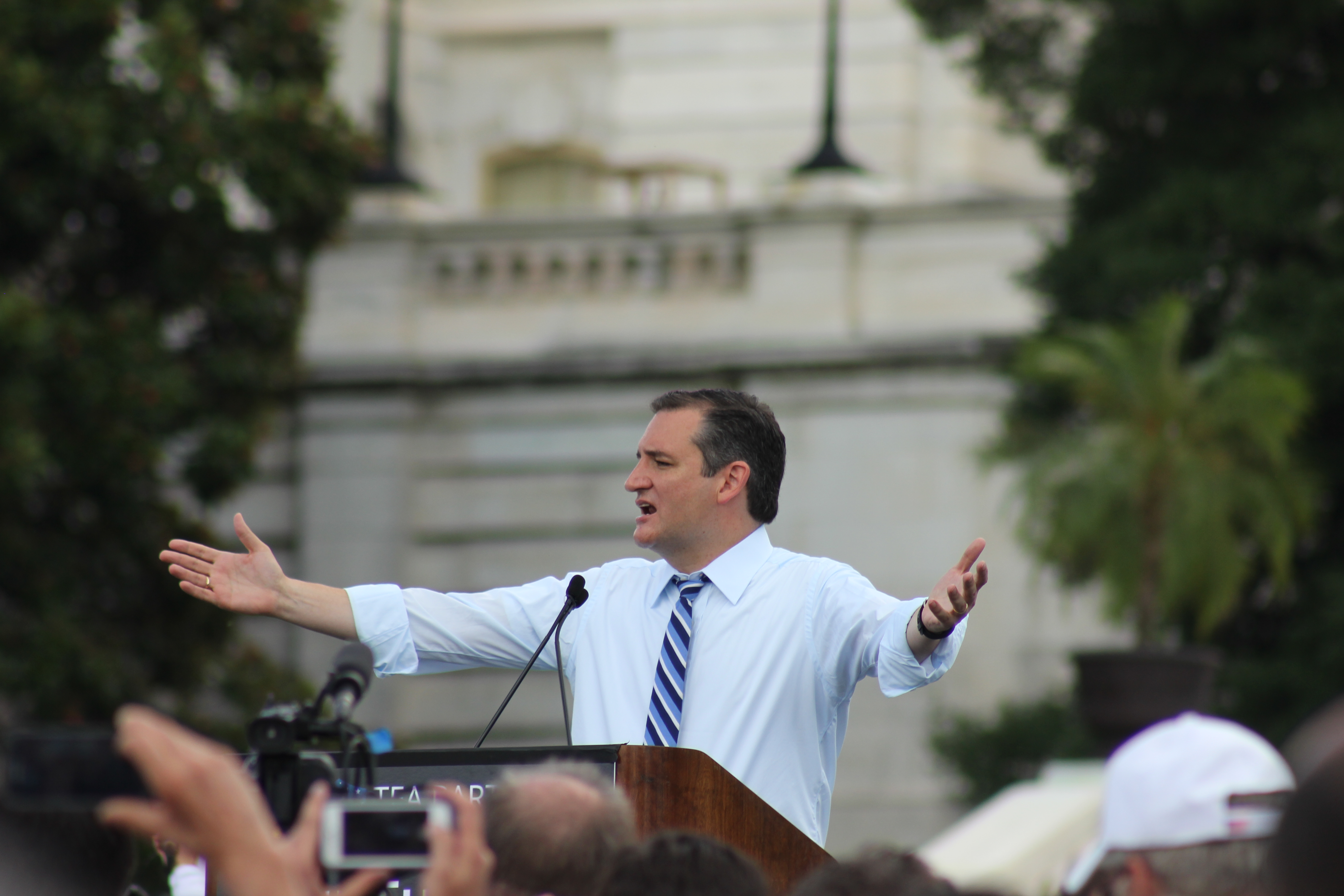
Senator Ted Cruz delivers a speech before protesters denouncing the Iran nuclear deal.

A rally organized in July 2015 by Jeffrey Wiesenfeld, an investment management principal and child of Holocaust survivors, drew thousands of people to Times Square in New York City to protest the Iran deal. The crowd which numbered in the thousands chanted "Kill the deal!" and "Where is Chuck?" (in reference to Senator Chuck Schumer) and saw bipartisan speakers including George Pataki and Alan Dershowitz.

In September 2015, Republican congressional leaders organized a Tea Party rally on the Capitol lawn to protest the terms of the JCPOA. For several hours hundreds of protesters voiced their opposition to the bill. Then-presidential candidate Donald Trump headlined the rally alongside Senator Ted Cruz. Trump spoke against the deal saying he had never seen a deal as "incompetently negotiated" as the Iranian nuclear deal. Other speakers included former Alaska governor Sarah Palin who similarly voiced opposition to the deal.

On the contrary, Democrats widely praised the deal with Democratic candidate and former Secretary of State Hillary Clinton releasing a statement announcing her support for the deal, "I support the agreement because it can help us prevent Iran from getting a nuclear weapon. With vigorous enforcement, unyielding verification, and swift consequences for any violations, this agreement can make the United States, Israel, and our Arab partners safer", and, "we should applaud President Obama, Secretary Kerry, and Secretary Moniz for getting this done, and proceed with wisdom and strength in enforcing this deal to the fullest and in meeting the broader Iranian challenge." Vermont Senator Bernie Sanders also supported the deal in order to "give peace a chance." However, Jim Webb former Democratic senator from Virginia and Secretary of the Navy broke from other Democratic candidates, telling National Public Radio that he was skeptical of removing sanctions and believed that the U.S. had tacitly acknowledged that Iran will develop a nuclear weapon.

The American Israel Public Affairs Committee, Washington D.C.–based pro-Israel 501(c)(4) organization, purchased more than $25 million in television advertising to assail the deal and began a campaign of lobbying congressman in its effort to scrap the JCPOA. Alongside its subsidiary group, Citizens for a Nuclear Free Iran, AIPAC's lobbying barrage targeted undecided Democratic politicians.

=== Polling ===
A CNN/ORC poll conducted in mid-August 2015 showed that 52% of American registered voters believe Congress should reject the JCPOA while a poll by Pew Research Center in September showed that only 21% of its respondents supported the deal while the rest either opposed it or offered no opinion. However that same month the University of Maryland held a panel which featured expert-vetted arguments on both sides of the issue and found that after weighing all options, only 45% of respondents opposed the deal. A poll conducted on behalf of the American Jewish Committee found that 47% of American Jews disapprove of the deal, with only a narrow majority supporting it. A poll of Iranian-Americans found that 8 in 10 believed the agreement would improve ties between the United States and Iran. A CNN/ORC poll administered in October 2017 on the Iran deal showed that 67% of American respondents wanted to remain in the deal.

=== Experts ===
William H. Tobey, a senior fellow in Harvard's Belfer Center for Science and International Affairs expressed his opposition to the deal saying that Iran gave too few concessions in return for too much sanctions relief and that the deal was simply postponing Iran's development of a nuclear weapon rather than halting it, calling the deal a mere "speed bump" in the country's path to being nuclear armed. An editorial written by former CIA analyst and vice president of the Center for Security Policy, a Washington D.C.–based conservative think tank, Frederick H. Fleitz, claimed that the deal was made at the expense of the United States and called it "not a verifiable agreement". Fleitz argued that since the IAEA only had non-negotiable access to declared nuclear sites and not military or missile facilities, the deal was toothless, and Iran could easily develop a nuclear weapon under the nose of international inspectors. James S. Robbins, a senior fellow in the American Foreign Policy Council called the deal "impotent" in an editorial in U.S. News & World Report due to the fact it does little to hamper Iran's missile programs.

In August 2015, a letter signed by 190 former generals and admirals was sent to Congressional leaders expressing opposition to the bill. The letter argued that the deal put too many limitations on IAEA access to Iranian sites, would provide Iran with $150 billion in sanctions relief much of which would surely go funding Iranian proxy groups in the Middle East, and offered too few concessions from Iran. American national security, the five paragraph letter argued, would be put at risk if the deal was not rejected. Some of the signers of the letter included Robert J. Kelly, former commander-in-chief of the United States Pacific Fleet, William G. Boykin, former Deputy Undersecretary of Defense for Intelligence, Joseph Hoar, former commander of U.S. Central Command, and Joe Sestak, former Navy vice admiral and Director for Defense on the National Security Council under Bill Clinton, among others. The letter was made in response to a letter signed by 36 generals and admirals praising the deal. In response to both letters, former Marine Corps general Anthony Zinni said "I'm convinced that 90% of the guys who signed the letter one way or the other don't have any clue about whether it's a good or bad deal. They sign it because somebody's asked them to sign it."

=== Trump administration ===
The Trump administration has characterized Iran as an adversary of the United States on numerous occasions and has been critical of the government in Tehran and the Iran nuclear deal. Over the course of the 2016 election, Donald Trump repeatedly attacked the deal. During a speech to the pro-Israel lobbying group AIPAC he said dismantling the Iranian nuclear deal was his first priority. During a presidential debate he described it as a "horrible deal".

After assuming office, Trump administration National Security Adviser Michael Flynn placed Iran "officially on notice" during a February 1 press conference. However, the Trump administration shied away from outright dismantling the deal. Instead, in April 2017 it commenced a "policy review" during which time it announced it would continue to implement the JCPOA. The administration continued to recertify the Iran deal despite President Trump's previous objections, most likely bowing to pressure from cabinet members Secretary of State Rex Tillerson and Secretary of Defense James Mattis who are proponents of the deal. However, National Security Adviser H.R. McMaster has called the Iran deal "fundamentally flawed", and added the "incompleteness" of the deal "could give the regime cover to advance a nuclear program." In October 2017, McMaster invited a group of Democratic senators to the White House for a policy discussion on the deal. Those in the meeting reported that they felt as if the purpose of the discussion was to give McMaster talking points in his attempt to persuade President Trump to remain in the deal. On 12 January 2018, President Trump issued another waiver of sanctions on Iran saying this was "to secure our European allies' agreement to fix the terrible flaws of the Iran nuclear deal."

On 8 May 2018, Trump announced United States withdrawal from JCPOA.

== See also ==
- Nuclear facilities in Iran
- Joint Plan of Action
- Iran nuclear deal framework
- Iran and weapons of mass destruction
- Views on the nuclear program of Iran
- Timeline of the nuclear program of Iran
- Iran Nuclear Achievements Protection Act
