= Kittrie =

Kittrie is a surname. Notable people with the surname include:

- Nicholas Kittrie (died 2019), American legal scholar
- Orde Kittrie, American legal scholar
