= Iran nuclear deal =

International agreement on the nuclear program of Iran

Joint Comprehensive Plan of Action
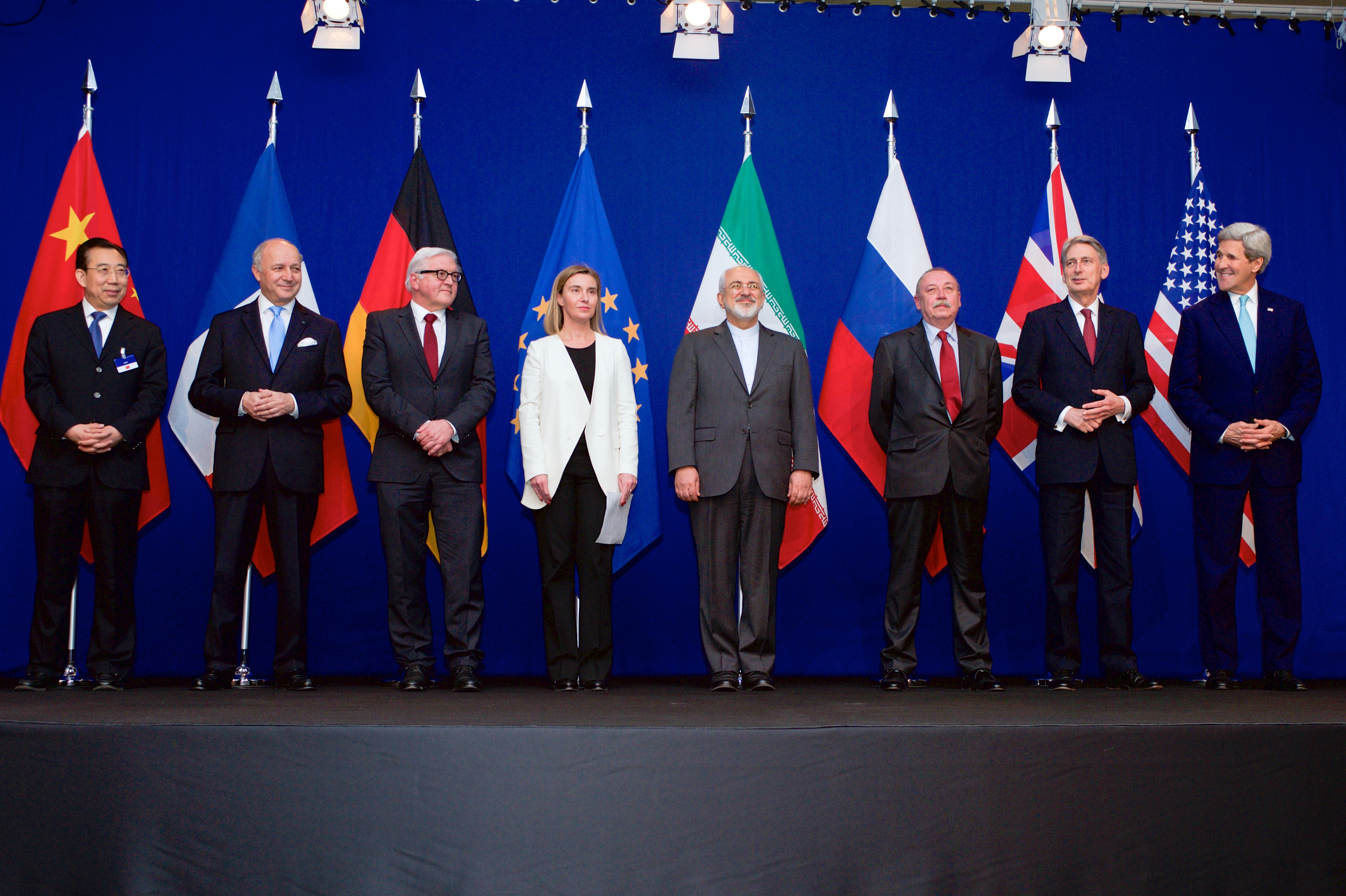
- Officials announcing the agreement
- Created: 14 July 2015
- Ratified: N/A (ratification not required)
- Date effective: 18 October 2015 (adoption); 16 January 2016 (implementation)
- Repealed: 18 October 2025
- Location: Vienna, Austria
- Signatories: China; France; Germany; Iran (withdrawn in 2025); Russia; United Kingdom; United States (withdrawn in 2018); European Union
- Purpose: Nuclear non-proliferation

The Joint Comprehensive Plan of Action (JCPOA; Persian: برنامه جامع اقدام مشترک, romanized: barnāmeye jāme'e eqdāme moshtarak (برجام, BARJAM)), more commonly known as the Iran nuclear deal or Iran deal, was an agreement to limit the Iranian nuclear program in return for sanctions relief and other provisions. The agreement was finalized in Vienna on 14 July 2015, between Iran and the P5+1 (the five permanent members of the United Nations Security Council (UNSC)—China, France, Russia, the United Kingdom, and the United States—plus Germany) (Note: The P5+1 are also sometimes referred to as the "E3+3", for the "EU three" countries (France, the UK, and Germany) plus the three non-EU countries (the U.S., Russia, and China). The terms are interchangeable; this article uses the "P5+1" phrase.) together with the European Union.

Formal negotiations began with the adoption of the Joint Plan of Action, an interim agreement signed between Iran and the P5+1 countries in November 2013. Iran and the P5+1 countries engaged in negotiations for the following 20 months and, in April 2015, agreed on a framework, which later led to JCPOA, along with a Roadmap Agreement between Iran and the International Atomic Energy Agency (IAEA).

Under the JCPOA, Iran agreed to constrain its nuclear program by limiting fuel cycle activities that could lead to the production of weapons-grade uranium or plutonium. The JCPOA restricted the number and type of centrifuges in operation, the level of uranium enrichment, and the size of Iran's enriched uranium stockpile. Key facilities at Fordow, Natanz and Arak were repurposed for civilian uses such as medical and industrial research. Iran agreed to accept more intrusive IAEA monitoring measures of its fuel-cycle related activities. In exchange for complying with these restrictions, Iran received relief from nuclear-related sanctions imposed by the United Nations, the EU, and the United States, but many U.S. sanctions unrelated to the nuclear issue—targeting Iran's missile program, support for militant groups, and human rights record—remained in place, limiting the economic effect of sanctions relief. The agreement also set a timetable to lift the UN arms embargo, contingent on Iran's continued compliance with civilian nuclear commitments.

The agreement took effect on 20 January 2016. It was criticized and opposed by Israel, Saudi Arabia, Iranian principlists, and the Republican Party in the United States.

The United States withdrew from the pact in 2018, imposing sanctions under its maximum pressure campaign. In a symbolic response, members of Iran's Islamic Consultative Assembly burned the text of JCPOA in the Assembly. The sanctions applied to all countries and companies doing business with Iran and cut it off from the international financial system, rendering the nuclear deal's economic provisions null. On 18 October 2025, in the aftermath of the Twelve-Day War, Iran officially announced the termination of the agreement after 10 years.

== Background ==
=== Nuclear technology ===
A fission-based "atomic" nuclear weapon uses a fissile material to cause a nuclear chain reaction. The most commonly used materials are uranium 235 (^{235}U) and plutonium 239 (^{239}Pu). Both uranium 233 (^{233}U) and reactor-grade plutonium have also been used. The amount of uranium or plutonium needed depends on the sophistication of the design, with a simple design requiring approximately 15 kg of uranium or 6 kg of plutonium and a sophisticated design requiring as little as 9 kg of uranium or 2 kg of plutonium. Plutonium is almost nonexistent in nature, and natural uranium is about 99.3% uranium 238 (^{238}U) and only 0.7% ^{235}U.

To make a weapon, either uranium must be enriched or plutonium must be produced. Uranium enrichment is required for nuclear power, although not to the same purity. For this reason, uranium enrichment is a dual-use technology required for both civilian and military purposes. Key strategies to prevent proliferation of nuclear arms include limiting the number of operating uranium enrichment plants and controlling the export of nuclear technology and fissile material.

=== Iranian nuclear activity, 1970–2006 ===
Iranian development of nuclear technology began in the 1970s, when the U.S. Atoms for Peace program began providing assistance. Iran ratified the Treaty on the Non-Proliferation of Nuclear Weapons (NPT) in 1970.

After the 1979 Iranian Revolution, Iran's nuclear program fell into disarray as many of Iran's nuclear experts fled the country. The new leader, Ayatollah Ruhollah Khomeini, initially opposed nuclear technology.

In the late 1980s, Iran reinstated its nuclear program with assistance from Pakistan, which signed an agreement with Iran in 1987; from China, which signed one in 1990; and from the A.Q. Khan network. In January 1995, Russia said it would complete construction at Bushehr and build three more reactors. Iran began pursuing nuclear capability, including uranium mining and experimenting with uranium enrichment.

In August 2002 the Paris-based Iranian dissident group National Council of Resistance of Iran publicly revealed the existence of two undeclared nuclear facilities, the Arak heavy-water production facility and the Natanz enrichment facility. In February 2003, Iranian President Mohammad Khatami acknowledged the existence of the facilities and acknowledged that Iran had undertaken "small-scale enrichment experiments" to produce low-enriched uranium for power plants. IAEA inspectors visited Natanz. In May 2003 Iran allowed IAEA inspectors to visit the Kalaye Electric Company, but not to take samples.

In June 2003, an IAEA report concluded that Iran had failed to meet its obligations under the safeguards agreement. Iran, faced with the prospect of a U.N. S.C. referral, entered negotiations with France, Germany, and the United Kingdom (the E.U. 3). The U.S. took no part. In October 2003, Iran and the E.U. 3 agreed to the Tehran Declaration. Iran agreed to full IAEA cooperation, to sign the Additional Protocol, and to temporarily suspend uranium enrichment. In September and October 2003 the IAEA inspected several facilities. This was followed by the Paris Agreement in November 2004, in which Iran agreed to temporarily suspend enrichment and conversion activities, including those related to centrifuges, and committed to working with the EU-3 to find a diplomatic solution".

In August 2005, Iranian President Mahmoud Ahmadinejad accused the Iranian negotiators of treason. Over the following two months, the E.U. 3 agreement fell apart as talks over the long term agreement broke down; the Iranian government "felt that the proposal was heavy on demands, light on incentives, did not incorporate Iran's proposals, and violated the Paris Agreement". Iran notified IAEA that it would resume enrichment at Esfahan.

In February 2006, Iran ended its implementation of the Additional Protocol and resumed enrichment at Natanz, prompting IAEA to refer Iran to the S.C. In April 2006 Ahmadinejad claimed that Iran had explored nuclear technology for power generation, not weapons. In June 2006 the E.U. 3 joined China, Russia, and the U.S., to form the P5+1. That July, the S.C. passed its first resolution (nr. 1696), demanding Iran stop uranium enrichment and processing. S.C. resolution 1737 was adopted in December; followed by others. The legal authority for IAEA referral and the S.C. resolutions derived from the IAEA Statute and the United Nations Charter. The resolutions demanded that Iran cease enrichment activities, and imposed sanctions, including bans on the transfer of nuclear and missile technology to the country and freezes on the assets of certain Iranian individuals and entities.

In July 2006, Iran opened the Arak heavy water production plant, which led to another S.C. resolution.

=== S.C. resolutions, 2007–2013 ===
Four more S.C. resolutions followed: 1747 (March 2007), 1803 (March 2008), 1835 (September 2008), and 1929 (June 2010). In Resolution 1803 and elsewhere the S.C. acknowledged Iran's rights under Article IV of the NPT, which provides the "inalienable right... to develop research, production and use of nuclear energy for peaceful purposes". (Note: The meaning of Article IV of the Nuclear Non-proliferation Treaty, and its application to Iran, is a matter of dispute. Gary Samore writes, "Whether the NPT guarantees signatories a right to enrichment is a long-standing dispute among the parties to the treaty." Iran and other countries (such as Argentina, Brazil, Germany, Japan, and South Africa) assert that signatories to the NPT have a right to enrich uranium under Article IV of the NPT. Professor William O. Beeman of the University of Minnesota, as well as Henry D. Sokolski, executive director of the Nonproliferation Policy Education Center, agree with this interpretation of the NPT. The U.S. position was unclear before 2006, but after that time the U.S. has taken the position that Iran does not have the right to uranium enrichment because this activity is not specifically cited in the NPT. In testimony before the Senate Foreign Relations Committee in October 2013, Sherman stated, "the U.S. position that that article IV of the Nuclear Nonproliferation Treaty does not speak about the right of enrichment at all [and] doesn't speak to enrichment, period. It simply says that you have the right to research and development. And many countries such as Japan and Germany have taken that [uranium enrichment] to be a right. But the United States does not take that position. ... We do not believe there is an inherent right by anyone to enrichment." The U.S. officials has also made the additional argument that whatever Iran's rights under the NPT might be, they were superseded by a series of UN Security Council resolutions demanding "that Iran suspend enrichment and reprocessing activities until 'confidence is restored in the purely peaceful nature of Iran's nuclear program.'" U.S. Secretary of State Kerry has said: "We do not recognize a right to enrich. It is clear ... in the nonproliferation treaty, it's very, very (clear) that there is no right to enrich. [The Iranians] have the ability to negotiate it, but they could only gain that capacity to have some enrichment as some countries do, if they live up to the whole set of terms necessary to prove it's a peaceful program." In March 2011 testimony before the House Foreign Affairs Committee, then-U.S. Secretary of State Hillary Clinton expressed a similar position, indicating that Iran should be permitted to enrich uranium under IAEA supervision once the international concerns over its nuclear program are resolved.)

In 2007, IAEA director-general Mohamed ElBaradei said that military action against Iran "would be catastrophic, counterproductive" and called for negotiations. ElBaradei specifically proposed a "double, simultaneous suspension, a time out" as a confidence-building measure, under which sanctions and enrichment would be suspended.

A November 2007 U.S. National Intelligence Estimate assessed that Iran had halted its nuclear weapons program in 2003; that estimate and U.S. Intelligence Community statements assessed that Iran was maintaining its option to develop nuclear weapons".

In September 2009 U.S. President Barack Obama revealed the existence of an underground enrichment facility in Fordow, near Qom. Israel threatened military action.

=== Joint Plan of Action (2013) ===
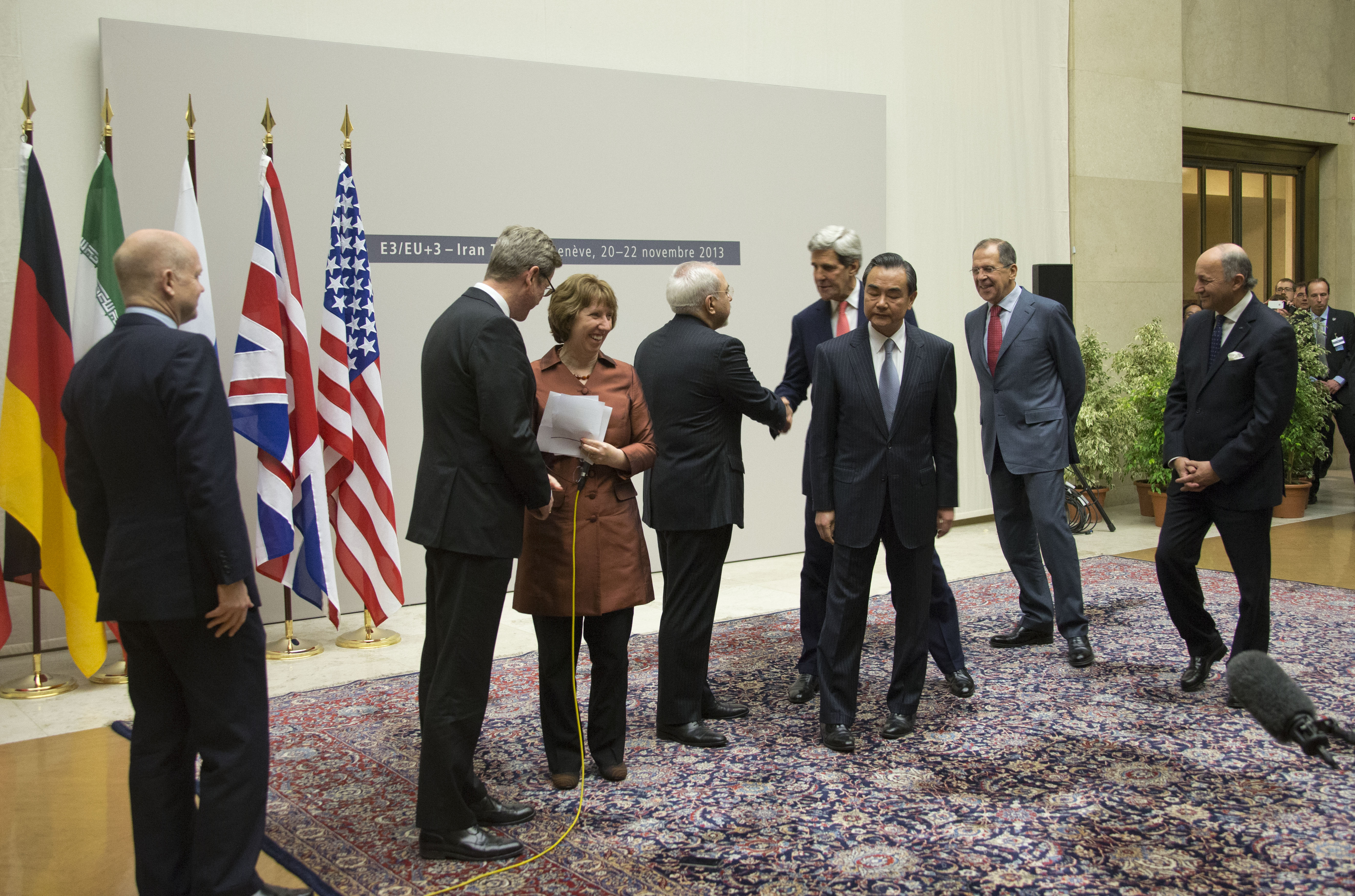
U.S. Secretary of State John Kerry shakes hands with Iranian Foreign Minister Javad Zarif after the P5+1 and Iran concluded negotiations about Iran's nuclear capabilities on 24 November 2013.

In March 2013, the U.S. and Iran began talks in Oman, led by William Burns and Jake Sullivan (U.S.) and Ali Asghar Khaji (Iran). In June, Hassan Rouhani was elected president of Iran. In a 2006 negotiation with Europe, Rouhani said that Iran had used the negotiations to dupe the Europeans, saying that during the negotiations, Iran had mastered the conversion of uranium yellowcake at Isfahan. In August, three days after his inauguration, Rouhani called for negotiations with the P5+1.

In September, Obama and Rouhani spoke by telephone, the first high-level contact between U.S. and Iranian leaders since 1979, and Secretary of State John Kerry met with Foreign Minister Mohammad Javad Zarif.

On 24 November, after several rounds of negotiations, the interim Joint Plan of Action was signed between Iran and the P5+1. It consisted of a short-term program freeze in exchange for decreased economic sanctions. The IAEA began inspections under this interim agreement. The agreement was formally activated on 20 January 2014. That day, an IAEA report stated that Iran was adhering to the interim agreement, including stopping enrichment of uranium to 20%, beginning to dilute half of the stockpile of 20% enriched uranium to 3.5%, and halting work on the Arak heavy-water reactor.

A major focus of the negotiations was limitations on the Arak IR-40 heavy water reactor and production plant (which was under construction, but never became operational). Iran agreed in the Joint Plan of Action not to commission or fuel the reactor; the Bushehr Nuclear Power Plant; the Gachin uranium mine; the Fordow Uranium Enrichment Plant; the Isfahan uranium-conversion plant; the Natanz uranium enrichment plant; and the Parchin military research and development complex.

== Negotiations (2014–2015) ==
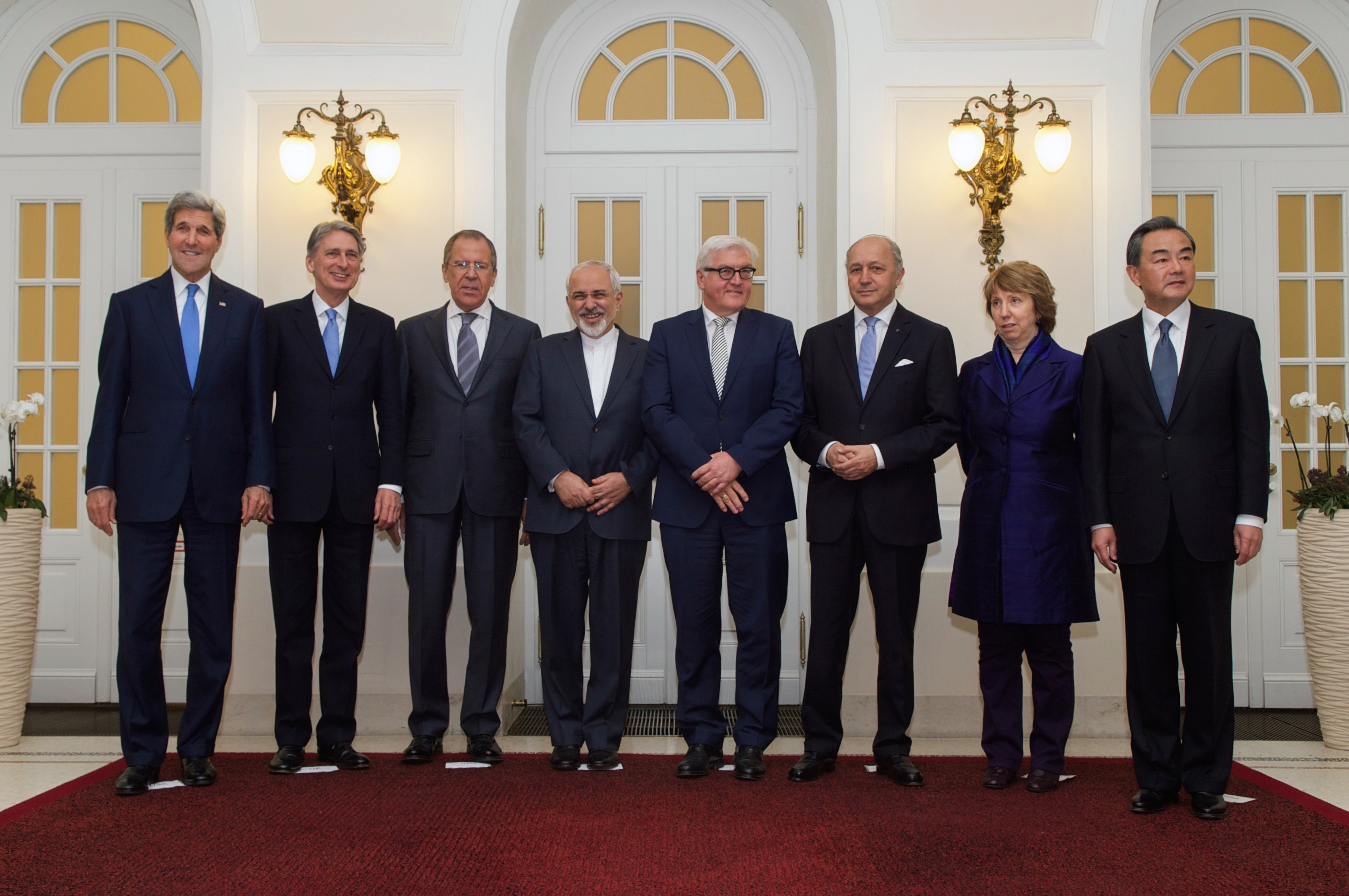
Foreign Ministers from the P5+1 nations, the European Union, and Iran in Vienna, Austria, on 24 November 2014

JCPOA was the culmination of a 20-month negotiation. The parties extended their talks, first to 24 November 2014 and then to 1 July 2015.

A framework was agreed on 2 April 2015 at Lausanne. Under this framework Iran tentatively agreed to accept restrictions, all of which would last a decade or longer, and to submit to increased inspections. Negotiations continued, ending in Vienna at the Palais Coburg. On 14 July 2015, all parties agreed.

The agreement reflects the impact of a June 2015 public letter by a bipartisan group of U.S. diplomats, experts, and others that outlined concerns about various provisions and called for strengthening the agreement. After the agreement was reached, one of the negotiators, Robert Einhorn, a former U.S. Department of State official, said: "Analysts will be pleasantly surprised. The more things are agreed to, the less opportunity there is for implementation difficulties later on."

An analysis by the Carnegie Endowment for International Peace claimed that the final agreement was based upon (and buttressed) "the rules-based nonproliferation regime created by the Nuclear Non-Proliferation Treaty (NPT) and including especially the IAEA safeguards system".

=== Participants ===
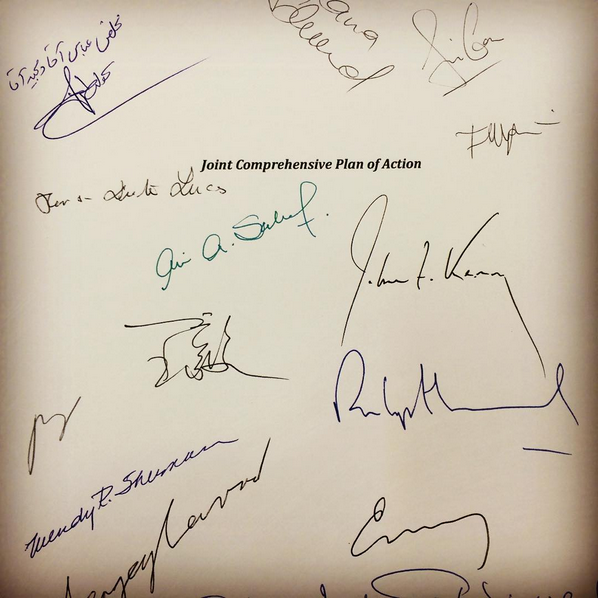
Souvenir signatures of lead negotiators on the cover page of the JCPOA document. The Persian handwriting on top left side is a homage by Javad Zarif to his counterparts' efforts in the negotiations: "[I am] Sincere to Mr. Abbas [Araghchi] and Mr. Majid [Takht-Ravanchi]."

In November 2015, U.S. State Department Assistant Secretary for Legislative Affairs Julia Frifield said: "The JCPOA is not a treaty or an executive agreement, and is not a signed document. The JCPOA reflects political commitments between Iran, the P5+1, and the EU."

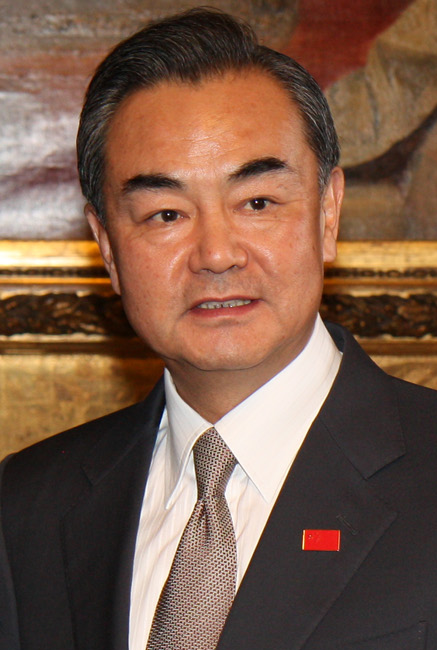
(China)
China
Wang Yi, Foreign Minister

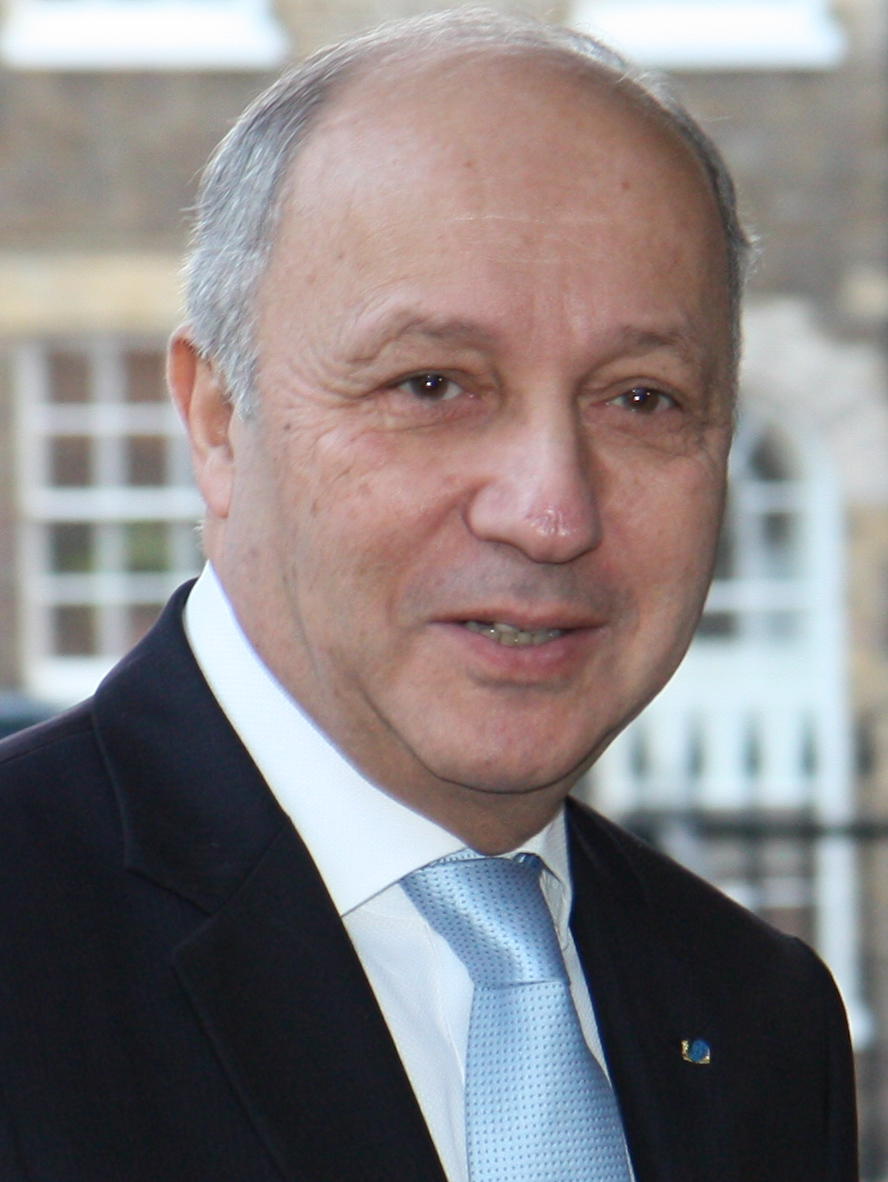
(France)
France
Laurent Fabius, Foreign Minister

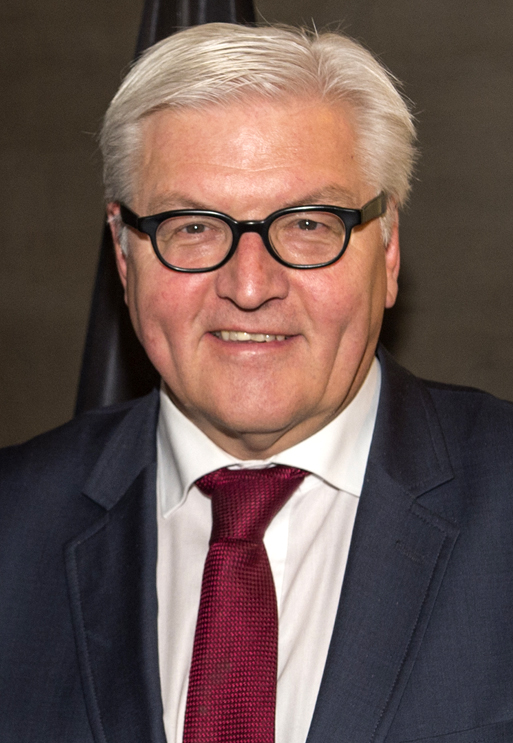
Germany
Frank-Walter Steinmeier, Minister of Foreign Affairs

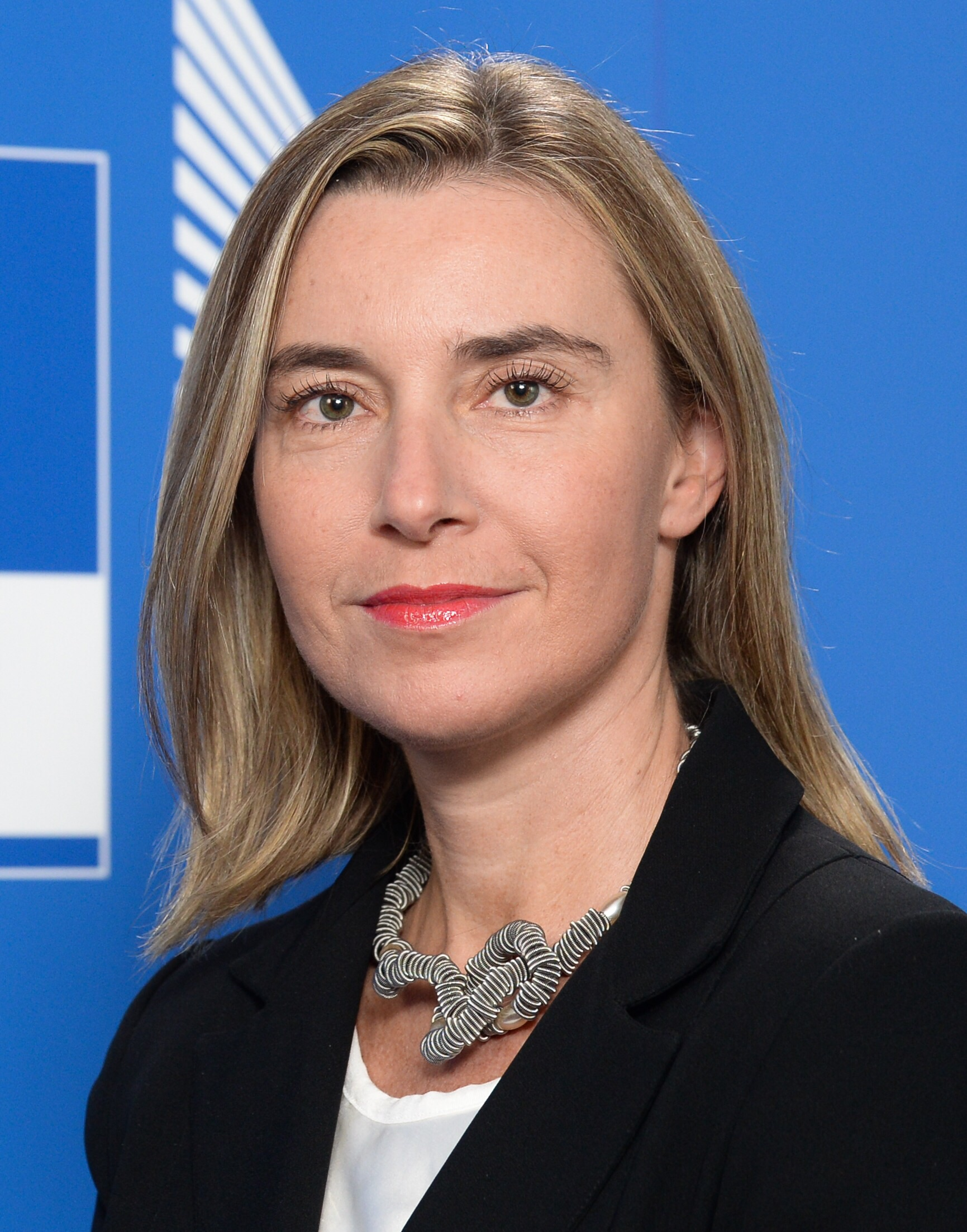
(European Union)
European Union
Federica Mogherini, High Representative

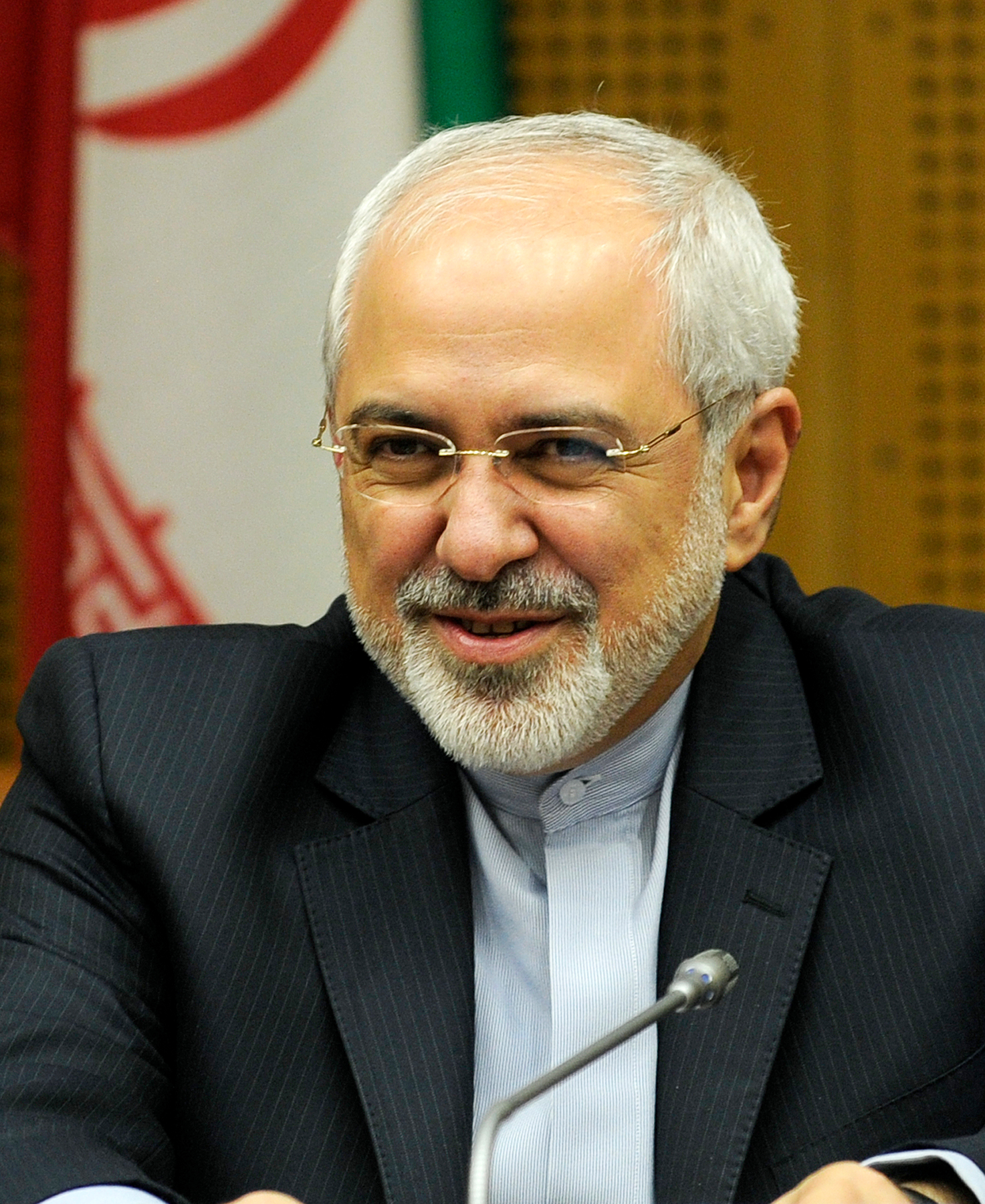
Iran
Mohammad Javad Zarif, Minister of Foreign Affairs

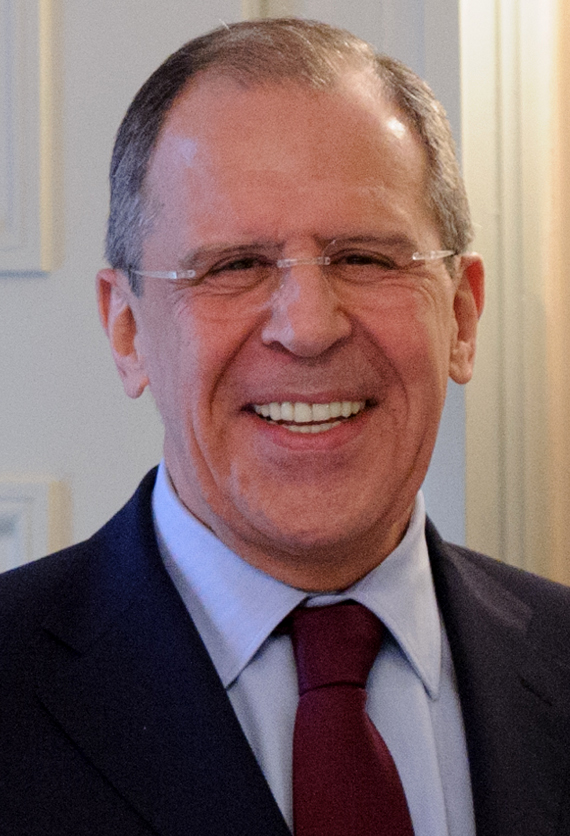
(Russia)
Russia
Sergey Lavrov, Foreign Minister

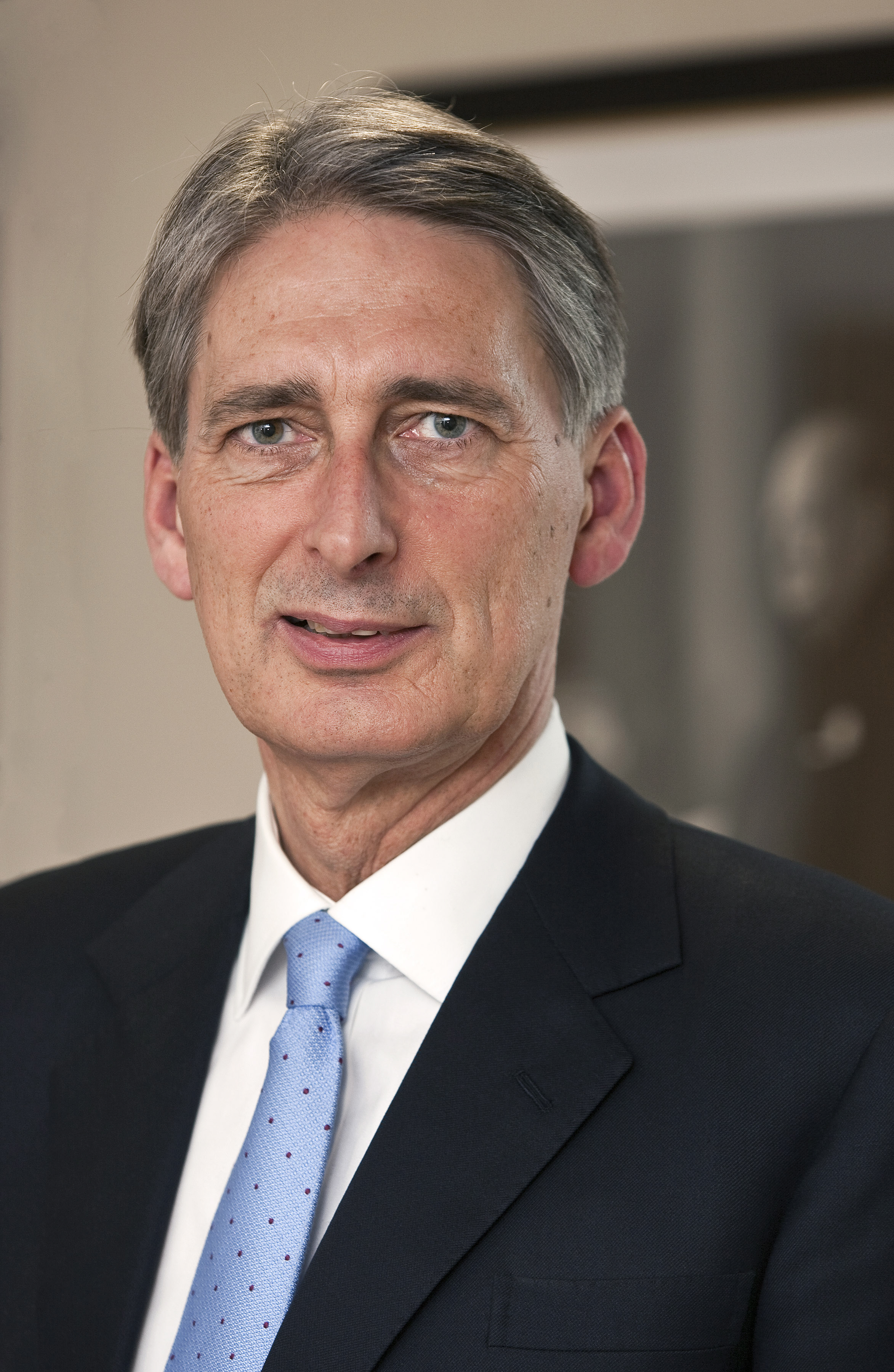
United Kingdom
Philip Hammond, Foreign Secretary

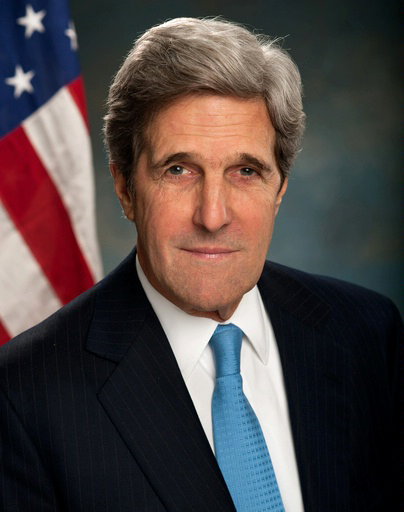
United States
John Kerry, Secretary of State

== Provisions ==
The Joint Comprehensive Plan of Action (JCPOA) covered 109 pages, including five annexes. The major provisions are:

=== Nuclear ===
Enrichment-related provisions
Capability	Before JCPOA	After JCPOA (for 10-year period)	After 15 years
First-generation centrifuges installed	19,138	capped at 6,104	Unconstrained (Note: According to the JCPOA, "The sequence and milestones set forth above and in Annex V are without prejudice to the duration of JCPOA commitments stated in this JCPOA.")
Advanced centrifuges installed	1,008	0	Unconstrained
Centrifuge R&D	Unconstrained	Constrained	Unconstrained
Stockpile of low-enriched uranium	7,154 kg	300 kg	Unconstrained
Stockpile of medium-enriched uranium	196 kg	0 kg	Unconstrained
The physical limits phase out over 10 to 15 years

=== Stocks ===
Over 15 years, Iran would reduce its stockpile of low-enriched uranium by 97%, from 10,000 kg to 300 kg, and limit enrichment to 3.67%, sufficient for civilian nuclear power and research, but not for weaponry. This represented a "major decline" in Iran's nuclear activity. Iran had produced stockpiles near 20% (medium-enriched uranium). Stocks in excess of 300 kg enriched up to 3.67% would be diluted to 0.7% or sold in return for uranium ore, while uranium enriched to between 5% and 20% was to be fabricated into fuel plates for the Tehran Research Reactor or sold or diluted to 3.67%. P5+1 agreed to facilitate commercial contracts.

After 15 years, all limits on enrichment would be removed, including limits on the type and number of centrifuges, Iran's stocks of enriched uranium, and enrichment sites. According to Harvard University's Belfer Center for Science and International Affairs, at this point Iran could "expand its nuclear program to create more practical overt and covert nuclear weapons options".

=== Centrifuges ===
Iran initially possessed centrifuges sufficient for one nuclear weapon, but not for nuclear power. Over ten years, Iran would secure over two-thirds of its centrifuges in storage, reducing active units to 6,104 centrifuges, with only 5,060 allowed to enrich uranium. Enrichment would be restricted to the Natanz plant. The centrifuges there were limited to IR-1 centrifuges, Iran's oldest and least efficient; Iran would warehouse its advanced IR-2M centrifuges during this period. Non-operating centrifuges would be stored in Natanz and monitored by IAEA, but could be used to replace failed centrifuges. Iran agreed to build no enrichment facilities for 15 years.

=== Research ===
Iran could continue research and development work on enrichment only at the Natanz facility and had to respect specific limitations for eight years. The intent was to maintain a one-year breakout interval.

=== Reactors ===
With cooperation from the "Working Group" (the P5+1 and possibly other countries), Iran was permitted to modernize the Arak heavy water research reactor based on an agreed design. Arak was to be limited to 20 MW (thermal) to support allowed research and production, while minimizing plutonium production and avoiding weapons-grade plutonium. Spent fuel was to be sent out of the country. All heavy water beyond Iran's reactor needs was to be exportable. In exchange, Iran imported 130 tonnes of uranium ore in 2015 and in late 2016 was approved to import 130 tonnes in 2017. For 15 years Iran agreed not to research or engage in spent fuel reprocessing, build additional heavy-water reactors, or accumulate heavy water.

Fordow would stop researching and enriching uranium for at least 15 years. The facility was to be converted into a nuclear physics and technology center. For 15 years Fordow would maintain no more than 1,044 IR-1 centrifuges in six cascades in one wing. Two of the six cascades would be transitioned for stable radioisotope production for medical, agricultural, industrial, and scientific use. The other four would remain idle. Iran agreed to keep no fissile material there.

=== Inspections ===
A comprehensive inspections regime would monitor and confirm Iranian compliance. The monitoring and inspections regime included provisional implementation of the Additional Protocol and additional measures to monitor centrifuge rotor production and stockpiles, and uranium mining. (Note: At the same time that the JCPOA was agreed to, Iran and the IAEA signed a separate document, the Roadmap for Clarification of Past and Present Outstanding Issues. The roadmap includes "the provision by Iran of explanations regarding outstanding issues" and provides "for technical expert meetings, technical measures and discussions, as well as a separate arrangement regarding the issue of Parchin", an Iranian military research and development site. "The specific measures that Iran is committed to take with respect to technical expert meetings and discussions and access to Parchin are contained in two separate documents between Iran and the IAEA that are not public." On 19 August 2015, the Associated Press reported that an anonymous official had given the AP an unsigned, preliminary draft of one of the confidential bilateral IAEA-Iran agreements. This draft indicated that Iran would be allowed to use its own inspectors to investigate the Parchin site. (The AP reported that two anonymous officials had told it that the draft does not differ from the final, confidential agreement between the IAEA and Iran). The AP said that the draft "diverges from normal procedures". Several hours after posting the article, the AP removed several details of the story (without issuing a formal retraction), and published another article that noted, "IAEA staff will monitor Iranian personnel as they inspect the Parchin nuclear site." The AP restored the contentious details the next morning and said it was standing by its entire story. It further published the full document it had transcribed. The following day, IAEA Director-General Yukiya Amano issued a statement stating: "I am disturbed by statements suggesting that the IAEA has given responsibility for nuclear inspections to Iran. Such statements misrepresent the way in which we will undertake this important verification work ... the arrangements are technically sound and consistent with our long-established practices. They do not compromise our safeguards standards in any way. The Road-map between Iran and the IAEA is a very robust agreement, with strict timelines, which will help us to clarify past and present outstanding issues regarding Iran's nuclear programme." The IAEA did not elaborate on the provisions of the confidential agreement, but the Arms Control Association has noted, "under managed access procedures that may be employed the IAEA, the inspected party may take environmental swipe samples at a particular site in the presence of the IAEA inspectors using swabs and containment bags provided by the IAEA to prevent cross contamination. According to former IAEA officials, this is an established procedure. Such swipe samples collected at suspect sites under managed access would likely be divided into six packages: three are taken by the IAEA for analysis at its Seibersdorf Analytical Lab and two to be sent to the IAEA's Network of Analytical Labs (NWAL), which comprises some 16 labs in different countries, and another package to be kept under joint IAEA and Iran seal at the IAEA office in Iran a backup and control sample if re-analysis might be required at a later stage. The process ensures the integrity of the inspection operation and the samples for all parties." Mark Hibbs of the Nuclear Policy Program at the Carnegie Endowment for International Peace and Thomas Shea, a former IAEA safeguards official and head of Defense Nuclear Nonproliferation Programs at the Pacific Northwest National Laboratory described a similar protocol in an article titled "No, Iran is not allowed to inspect itself." Hibbs and Shea wrote that the claims that Iran would be in charge of inspections at Parchin were "wholly specious" and "unfounded". Arms control expert Jeffrey Lewis of the Monterey Institute of International Studies stated that the procedures referred to in the AP report were consistent with expert practice: "There are precedents for just providing photos and videos. When the South Africans disabled their nuclear test shaft, they video-recorded it and sent the IAEA their video. I don't care who takes a swipe sample or who takes a photograph, so long as I know where and when it was taken, with very high confidence, and I know that it hasn't been tampered with." Lewis expressed the opinion that "the point of the leak was to make the IAEA agreement on Parchin sound as bad as possible, and to generate political attention in Washington." On 21 September 2015, both the Associated Press and Reuters noted that under the arrangement between Iran and the IAEA, Iranian technicians, instead of the IAEA's experts, would take environmental samples. Reuters also reported that a spokesman for Iran's atomic energy agency said Iranian nuclear experts have "taken environmental samples from Parchin without U.N. inspectors present".)

The IAEA was to have multilayered oversight "over Iran's entire nuclear supply chain, from uranium mills to its procurement of nuclear-related technologies". For sites such as Fordow and Natanz, the IAEA was to have 24-hour access to nuclear facilities and maintain continuous monitoring (including via surveillance equipment). The agreement authorized the IAEA to use sophisticated monitoring technology, such as fiber-optic equipment seals that could send the IAEA information; satellite imagery to detect covert sites; sensors to detect minute nuclear specimens; and tamper- and radiation-resistant cameras. Other tools included software to gather information and detect anomalies, and datasets on imports. The number of inspectors tripled to 150.

Inspectors could request access, informing Iran of the basis of the request, to verify the absence of prohibited activities and nuclear materials. The inspectors were to come only from countries with which Iran had diplomatic relations. Iran could either allow the inspection or propose alternatives that satisfied the IAEA's concerns. If the inspectors were not satisfied, a 24-day process would ensue. Iran and the IAEA were to have 14 days to reach agreement. For the following week a majority of the commission could require Iran to take specific actions within three more days. This allowed the U.S. and its allies to insist on responses that Iran, Russia or China could not veto. After three days of non-compliance, sanctions would be automatically reimposed.

=== Breakout ===
These provisions were intended to extend the "breakout time"—the interval during which Iran could prepare enough material for a single nuclear weapon—from two to three months to one year. (Note: Ali Vaez, the senior analyst on Iran at the International Crisis Group, notes that breakout time is not precisely measurable and is "estimated rather than calculated", depending on various assumptions and factors. Vaez notes, "Breakout estimates ... usually assume that an Iranian dash for the bomb would face none of the technical challenges that have plagued the program over the past decade.") The Belfer Center and Center for Arms Control and Non-Proliferation supported these estimates. By contrast, Alan J. Kuperman, coordinator of the Nuclear Proliferation Prevention Project at University of Texas at Austin, disagreed, arguing that the breakout time would be only three months.

After ten years or more, the breakout time would gradually decrease. By the 15th year, U.S. officials said the breakout time would return to the status quo ante of a few months. The Belfer Center report stated: "Some contributors to this report believe that breakout time by year 15 could be comparable to what it is today—a few months—while others believe it could be reduced to a few weeks."

=== Exemptions ===
Iran was granted exemptions prior to 16 January 2016. Their reported purpose was to enable sanctions relief and other benefits to start by that date. The exemptions allowed Iran to:

- exceed the 300 kg of 3.5% LEU limit;
- exceed the zero kg of near 20% LEU limit;
- keep operating 19 "hot cells" that exceed the size limit;
- maintain control of 50 tonnes of heavy water that exceeded the 130-tonne limit by storing the excess at an Iran-controlled facility in Oman.

=== Sanctions ===
Iran had to submit a full report on its nuclear history before it could receive any sanctions relief. At the time of the agreement, Iran was subject to a variety of sanctions imposed by an array of organizations. Once IAEA verified compliance with the nuclear-related measures, U.N. sanctions would terminate. Some E.U. sanctions would terminate and some would suspend. That would allow Iran to recover approximately $100 billion of its assets frozen in overseas banks. No U.N. or E.U. nuclear-related sanctions or restrictive measures were to be imposed.

Additional E.U. sanctions would be lifted after eight years of compliance, including some on the Revolutionary Guards.

The U.S. agreed to suspend its nuclear-related secondary sanctions. This was not tied to a date or compliance but was expected to occur "roughly in the first half of 2016". Some sanctions would continue: those on conventional weapon sales for five years; those on ballistic missile technologies for eight. But sanctions related to human rights, missiles, and support for terrorism remained in effect. Many U.S. sanctions apply worldwide; E.U. sanctions apply only in Europe.

==== Snapback ====
Under the JCPOA, any of the P5+1 countries could invoke a "snapback" mechanism, allowing for the automatic reimposition of UN sanctions if Iran was found to be in significant non-compliance with the deal. Snapback sanctions would not apply retroactively to contracts that were lawful at the time they were signed.

=== Dispute resolution ===
Any party could refer allegations of non-compliance to the Joint Commission monitoring body. Complaints by a non-Iran party that were not resolved to the complainant's satisfaction within 35 days would allow the complainant to cease performing its commitments, notify the S.C., or both. The S.C. would then have 30 days to adopt a resolution to continue the sanctions relief. Absent such a resolution, nuclear-related U.N. sanctions would automatically be reimposed. Iran said it would then cease performing its nuclear obligations. This would allow any permanent S.C. member (U.S., United Kingdom, China, Russia or France) to veto sanctions relief.

This procedure implied that the U.S., U.K., or France could reinstitute sanctions if it concluded that Iran was non-compliant, though since that might cause Iran to withdraw from the agreement, they might be reluctant to do so.

=== Expiration ===
"Transition Day" was to occur either eight years after Adoption Day or earlier if the IAEA reached its broader conclusion on Iran's nuclear program. At that point, the UN would lift restrictions on missiles, Iran was expected to pursue ratification of its Additional Protocol, the EU must end its remaining nuclear-related sanctions, and the United States would remove specific items from its sanctions list and work toward ending certain sanctions through legislative means.

"Termination Day" was set for 18 October 2025—ten years after Adoption Day. It would mark the end of UN Security Council Resolution 2231 and the council's formal closure of Iran's nuclear file. With this, the mechanism allowing any participant to unilaterally reimpose prior UN sanctions on Iran's nuclear program without risk of veto, known as the snapback provision, would also expire.

After 15 years, many provisions of the JCPOA would expire, including most enrichment provisions.

=== International reaction ===
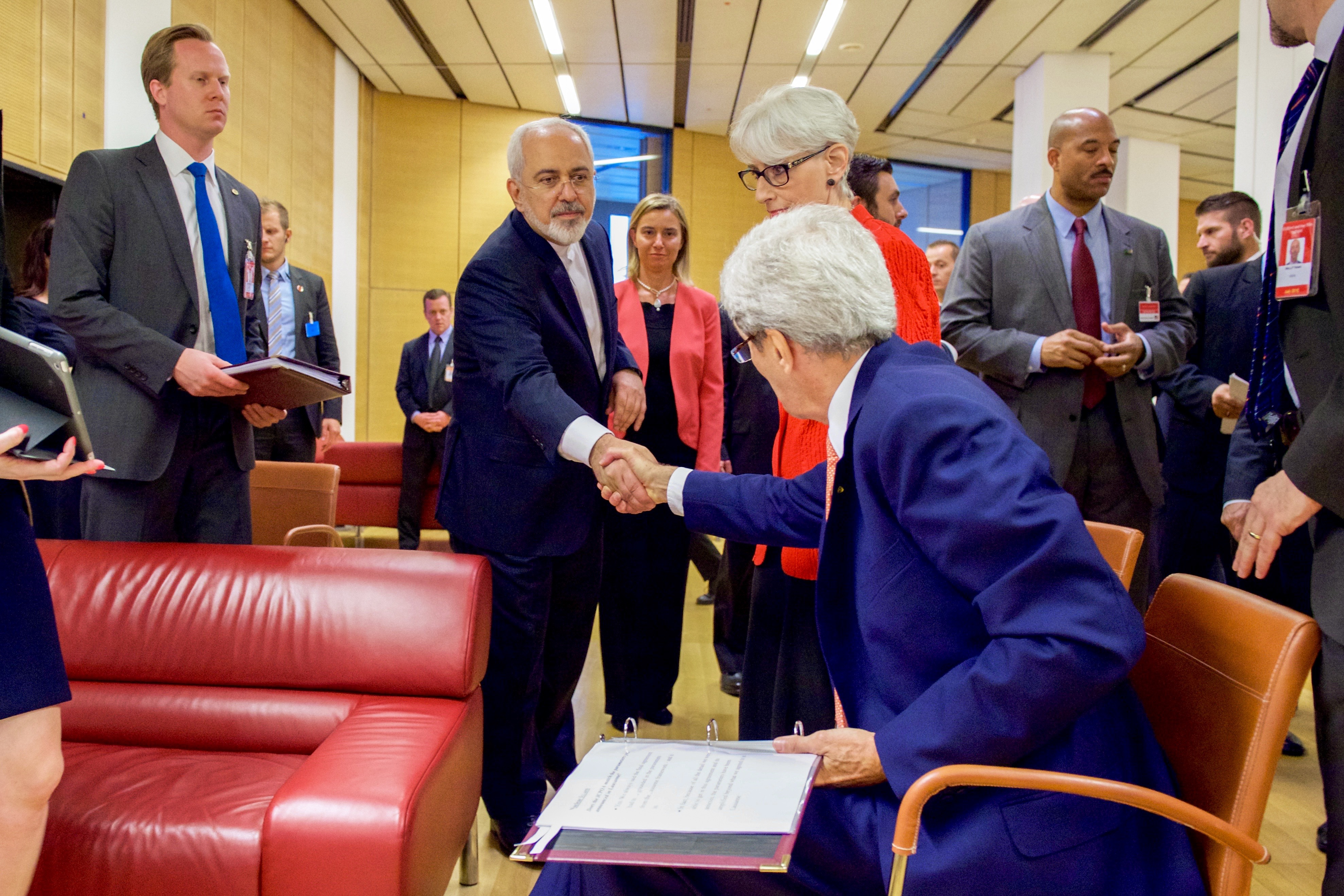
Pictured here, Iranian Minister of Foreign Affairs Mohammad Javad Zarif and U.S. Secretary of State John Kerry shaking hands at the end of negotiations on 14 July 2015, Vienna. They shook hands on 26 September 2013 in the United Nations Headquarters for the first time.

The JCPOA received a mixed international reaction. Many countries expressed hope that it could achieve its goals, while Iranian adversaries in the Middle East, including Israel and Saudi Arabia, and some U.S. lawmakers saw it as defective and appeasing Iran.

=== Unique elements ===
JCPOA was the first of its kind in the annals of non-proliferation. The 159-page JCPOA document and its five appendices is the longest text of a multinational agreement since World War II, according to BBC Persian.

It was the first time that the Security Council had recognized a developing country's nuclear enrichment program and backed a multinational agreement within the framework of a resolution (2231). For the first time in U.N. history, a country—Iran—was able to rid itself of six U.N. resolutions—1696, 1737, 1747, 1803, 1835, 1929—without abiding by them for a single day. Sanctions against Iran were lifted for the first time.

Iran was the first country subject to Chapter VII of the United Nations Charter that ended its case by diplomacy. All other cases ended by regime change, war, or acquiescence.

Gary Sick said that during the history of the Nuclear Non-Proliferation Treaty (NPT), no country other than Iran had ever voluntarily agreed to such restrictions.

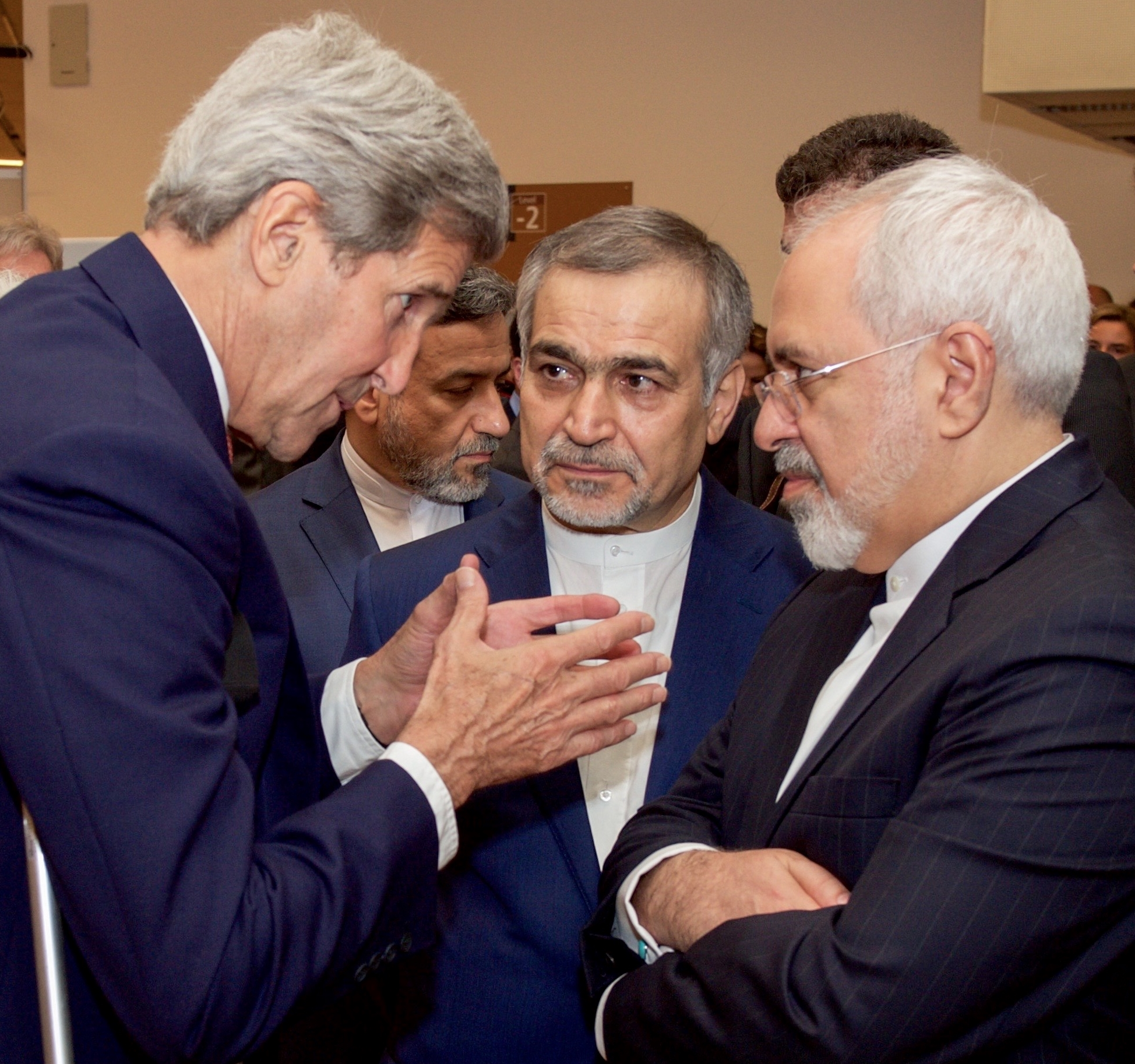
John Kerry with Hossein Fereydoun, the brother of 7th President of Iran Hassan Rouhani and Mohammad Javad Zarif during the announcement of the Joint Comprehensive Plan of Action

During the final negotiations, Kerry stayed in Vienna for 17 days, the longest interval a Cabinet official had devoted to a single international negotiation in more than four decades. Zarif broke the record for an Iranian Foreign Minister staying far from home with an 18-day stay in Vienna, and set the record of 106 days of negotiations over 687 days, more than any other chief nuclear negotiator in 12 years. The negotiations became the longest continuous negotiations with the presence of all five foreign ministers of the permanent Security Council members.

The negotiations included "rare events" in Iran–U.S. relations over their entire history. Kerry and Zarif met on 18 different dates—sometimes more than once per day—and in 11 different cities. On 27 April 2015, Kerry visited the official residence of the Permanent Representative of Iran to the United Nations to meet his counterpart. The encounter was the first since the Iran hostage crisis. On the sidelines of the 70th session of the United Nations General Assembly, President Obama shook hands with Zarif, the first such greeting in history. The event was unique in the form of diplomatic ranks, as a head of state shook hands with a minister. Obama said, "Too much effort has been put into the JCPOA and we all should be diligent to implement it."

== Incorporation and implementation ==
=== Incorporation into international law by the Security Council ===
The S.C. formally endorsed the agreement on 20 July 2015.

On 15 July, U.S. Ambassador to the UN Samantha Power circulated a 14-page draft to Council members. On 20 July, the S.C. approved resolution 2231 by a 15–0 vote. The resolution delayed implementation for 90 days to allow for U.S. Congressional consideration under the Iran Nuclear Agreement Review Act of 2015.

Speaking immediately after the vote, Power told the S.C. that sanctions relief would start only when Iran "verifiably" met its obligations. She also called upon Iran "to immediately release all unjustly detained Americans", specifically naming Amir Hekmati, Saeed Abedini, and Jason Rezaian, who were detained at the time, and Robert A. Levinson, who had been missing in the country. Hekmati, Abedini, and Rezaian were released in a January 2016 prisoner exchange, which Kerry said the nuclear agreement had accelerated.

=== Iranian review ===
Supreme Leader Ali Khamenei gave President Hassan Rouhani guidelines for how to proceed. On 21 June 2015, the Iranian Parliament (Majlis) formed a committee to study the JCPOA and decided to wait at least 80 days before voting. Zarif and Atomic Energy Organization of Iran (AEOI) chief Ali Akbar Salehi defended the deal in Parliament.

In televised remarks on 23 July 2015, Rouhani rejected domestic criticism by Iranian hardliners, such as the Islamic Revolutionary Guard Corps. He claimed a popular mandate to make an agreement based on his election in 2013 and said the alternative was suffering under continued sanctions. A two-page, top-secret directive from Iran's Supreme National Security Council instructed newspapers to avoid criticism or giving any impression of disagreement at the highest levels of government.

On 2 September, Iranian defense minister Hossein Dehqan said that Iran would not allow the IAEA to visit every site or facility it wished. On 3 September, Khamenei said that the Majlis should make the final decision. The same day, Parliament Speaker Ali Larijani voiced his support. Former presidents Akbar Hashemi Rafsanjani and Mohammad Khatami and moderates within parliament announced their support. Most prominent opposition leaders, including Mir-Hossein Mousavi, a 2009 presidential candidate under house arrest for his role as a leader of the Green Movement, also announced their support.

The anti-agreement coalition included former president Mahmoud Ahmadinejad, former head of AEOI Fereydoon Abbasi, ex-nuclear negotiator Saeed Jalili, and various conservative clerics and IRGC commanders. This group claimed that Iranian negotiators caved on many key issues and were outmaneuvered.

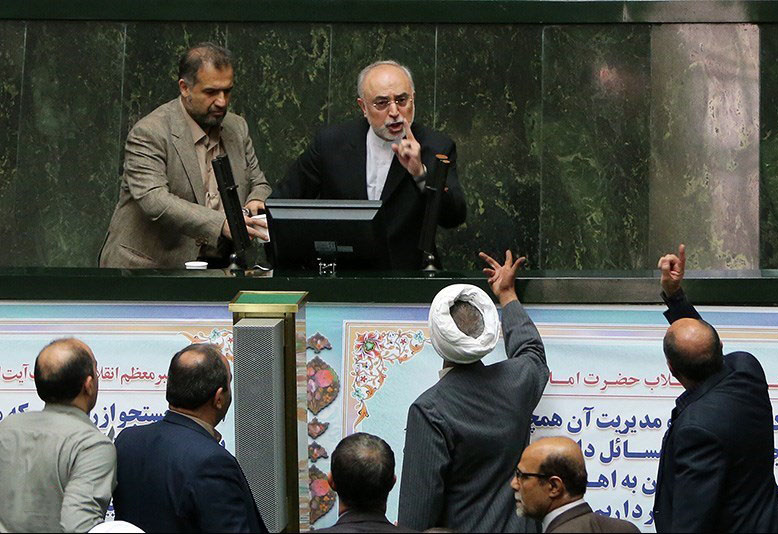
Anti-JCPOA representatives of Islamic Consultative Assembly protested Ali Akbar Saheli and made death threats toward him.

The Majlis commission for examining the JCPOA invited Ali Shamkhani, as well as members of a former nuclear negotiation team including Ali Bagheri and Abbasi, to a hearing. During the session, ex-chief negotiator Saeed Jalili said that "approximately 100 absolute rights" of Iran had been conceded and that the deal turned Iran's right to adopt nuclear technology under the NPT into mere permission. He claimed that the deal violated the terms Khamenei set. Commission members Masoud Pezeshkian and Abbas Ali Mansouri Arani criticized Jalili's testimony. In another session, negotiators Abbas Araqchi and Majid Takht-Ravanchi defended the deal.

The leading reformist newspapers, Etemad and Shargh, supported the deal. The leading conservative papers, Ettelaat and Kayhan, criticized its terms.

Many Iranian dissidents, including Nobel Peace Prize laureate, human rights activist, and Iranian exile Shirin Ebadi and former political prisoner Akbar Ganji came out in support. Others opposed the agreement, including Ahmad Batebi, Nazanin Afshin-Jam, and Roozbeh Farahanipour.

On 13 October the Iranian Parliament approved the JCPOA supplemented by text unilaterally added by Iran and not agreed to by the P5+1, with 161 votes in favor, 59 against, and 13 abstentions.

=== Review period in the U.S. Congress ===
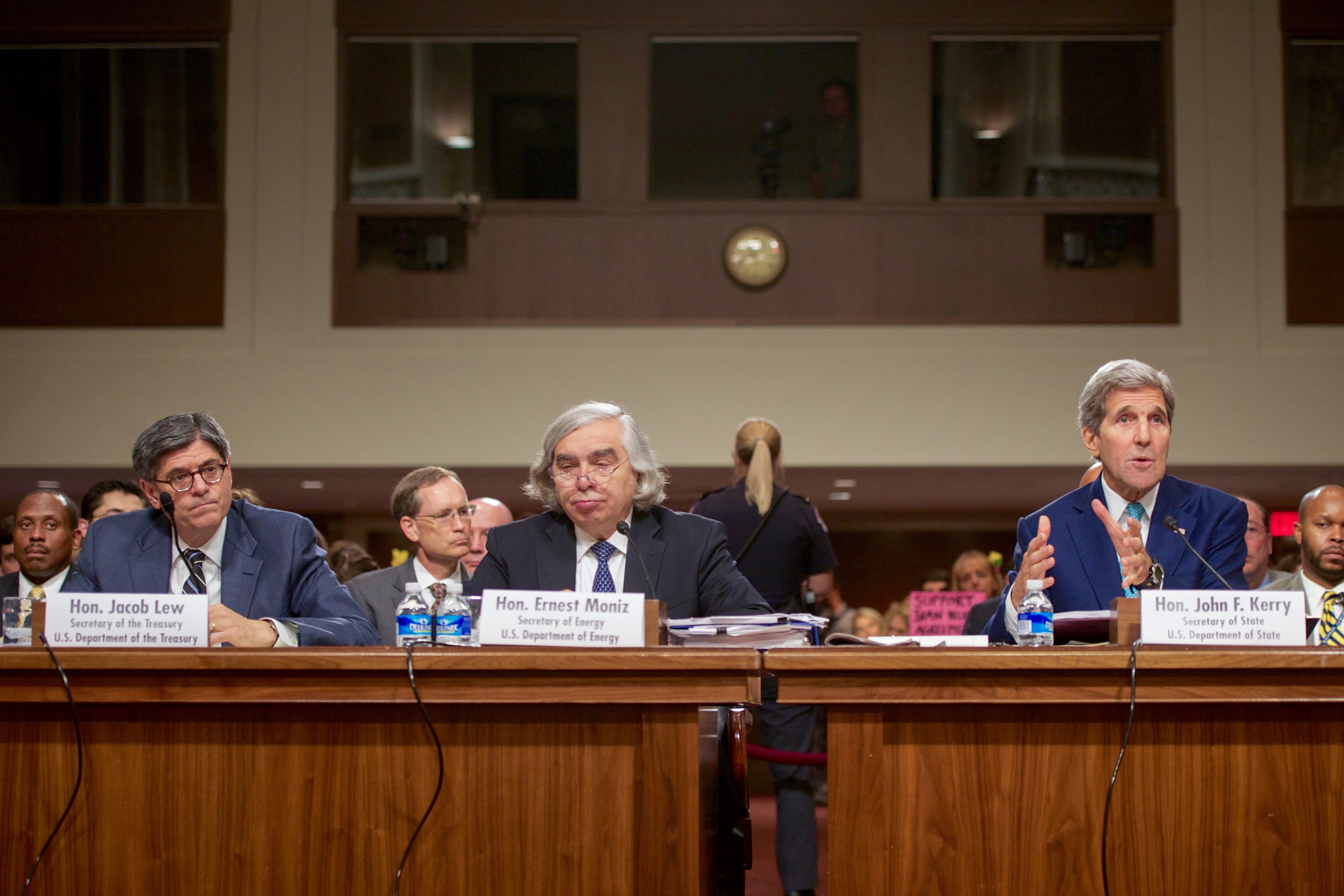
Secretary of State John Kerry, Secretary of Energy Ernest Moniz, and Secretary of the Treasury Jack Lew defending the JCPOA at a hearing of the Senate Foreign Relations Committee on 23 July 2015

The agreement's legal status in the U.S. was disputed. (Note: The extent to which the JCPOA is legally binding on the United States—i.e., whether a future president could lawfully repudiate the JCPOA once it goes into effect—is a matter of dispute. Legal scholars Bruce Ackerman of Yale Law School and David Golove of the New York University School of Law argue that the Iran Nuclear Agreement Review Act of 2015 had the effect of making the agreement (once implemented) into a congressional-executive agreement. Golove states that the president cannot "ignore commitments [made by him or by a past president] in congressional-executive agreements without congressional authority to do so", and believes that the agreement is binding under international law, irrespective of any White House declaration, because it contains no provision saying otherwise. Ackerman agrees, arguing, "Presidents do not have the power to repudiate congressional-executive agreements without strictly following the procedures laid out by Congress in its original authorizing legislation." Others, such as Michael Ramsey of the University of San Diego School of Law, argue that unless Congress expressly approves of the agreement via a resolution of approval (which is unlikely), the agreement is nonbinding under domestic law, so that "this president can implement to the extent of his statutory and constitutional authority [and] future presidents can refuse to follow." Ramsey points out, however, that even if the agreement is a nonbinding executive agreement under domestic law, it may still be binding under international law, since domestic invalidity is not a defense to failure to follow an international agreement. The position of the U.S. government is different. Secretary of State Kerry stated in a Senate Foreign Relations Committee hearing, "with respect to the talks, we've been clear from the beginning. We're not negotiating a, quote, 'legally binding plan.' We're negotiating a plan that will have in it a capacity for enforcement." (Kerry also said that a future president is, as a practical matter, unlikely to "turn around and just nullify it" given the international agreement from the other P5+1 powers.) Several legal scholars support this argument. John B. Bellinger III argues: "The next president will have the legal right under both domestic and international law to scrap the JCPOA and reimpose U.S. nuclear sanctions on Iran." Bellinger states that "such an action would be inconsistent with political commitments made by the Obama administration and would likely cause a major rift with U.S. allies and Iran to resume its nuclear activities," but that "would not constitute a violation of international law, because the JCPOA is not legally binding". Orde Kittrie of Arizona State University similarly writes that the JCPOA is a kind of "nonbinding, unsigned political" agreement considered "more flexible than treaties or other legally binding international agreements".) Under U.S. law, the JCPOA is a non-binding political commitment. According to the State Department, it is neither an executive agreement nor a treaty (as defined in U.S. law). In contrast to treaties, which require two-thirds of the Senate to consent to ratification, executive commitments require no congressional approval and are not legally binding under domestic law, though they may carry weight under international law. (Note: The "vast majority of international agreements" negotiated by the United States, especially in recent decades, have been executive agreements, rather than treaties. In 2003, the U.S. Supreme Court held in American Insurance Association v. Garamendi, "our cases have recognized that the President has authority to make 'executive agreements' with other countries, requiring no ratification by the Senate or approval by Congress, this power having been exercised since the early years of the Republic." Various opponents of the JCPOA, including David B. Rivkin Jr., Lee A. Casey, and Michael Ramsey have criticized the form of the agreement, arguing that it should be considered a treaty rather than an executive agreement. Other commentators disagree; the constitutionality of the executive agreement form of the JCPOA has been defended by Jack Goldsmith, who called arguments for the illegality of the agreement "weak", and by John Yoo, who wrote that the executive agreement form of the JCPOA is consistent with the Treaty Clause of the Constitution.)

In May 2015, the U.S. enacted the Iran Nuclear Agreement Review Act (INARA), (Note: The Iran Nuclear Agreement Review Act of 2015, Pub.L. 114–17, was an amendment to the Atomic Energy Act of 1954.) which gave Congress a defined period to review any nuclear agreement with Iran. Under the Act, once the JCPOA was submitted, Congress had 60 days to pass a resolution of approval or disapproval or take no action. Additional time was allotted to allow for potential presidential vetoes and override votes.

On 19 July 2015, the State Department formally transmitted the JCPOA to Congress, along with an unclassified verification report and a classified annex from the Intelligence Community. The 60-day review period began on 20 July and ended on 17 September. A resolution of disapproval failed in the Senate, as did a resolution of approval in the House. As a result, the agreement went into effect after the congressional review period expired.

==== Congress and the administration ====
Obama repeatedly urged Congress to support the agreement, noting the inspections regime's vigor and criticizing opponents for failing to offer a viable alternative. Vice President Joe Biden met with Senate Foreign Relations Committee Democrats, seeking their support.

Republicans generally rejected the deal. Cruz said that under the agreement "the Obama administration will become the financier of terrorism against America in the world." Former Governor Mike Huckabee of Arkansas, a candidate for the 2016 Republican presidential nomination, called Obama "naive". Obama cited the support of Democrats typically associated with strong defense backgrounds, saying, "This is a deal that has been endorsed by people like Brent Scowcroft and Sam Nunn... historic Democratic and Republican leaders on arms control and on keeping America safe".

Senate Majority Leader Mitch McConnell promised that Republicans would discuss the agreement respectfully in September. Democrat Senate Minority Leader Chuck Schumer distinguished the nuclear and non-nuclear aspects. His conclusion was: "when it comes to the nuclear aspects of the agreement within ten years, we might be slightly better off with it. However, when it comes to the nuclear aspects after ten years and the non-nuclear aspects, we would be better off without it."

Director of National Intelligence James Clapper said that JCPOA "puts U.S. in a far better place in terms of insight and access" than no agreement.

==== Committee hearings ====
A Senate Foreign Relations Committee hearing took place on 23 July. Kerry, Treasury Secretary Jack Lew, and Moniz testified. Chair Bob Corker said the agreement codified rather than dismantled the Iranian program. Ranking member Benjamin Cardin remained neutral. Other Democrats, led by Barbara Boxer, expressed support. Corker and Cardin requested to review the IAEA-Iran document. Kerry, Lew, and Moniz said that without JCPOA, international sanctions would collapse. Republican senators gave vociferous speeches denouncing the deal.

The three also testified before the House Committee on Foreign Affairs. Republican Committee chair Ed Royce claimed that the deal traded permanent sanctions relief for temporary restrictions and criticized the inspection regime. Ranking member Eliot Engel was not in support.

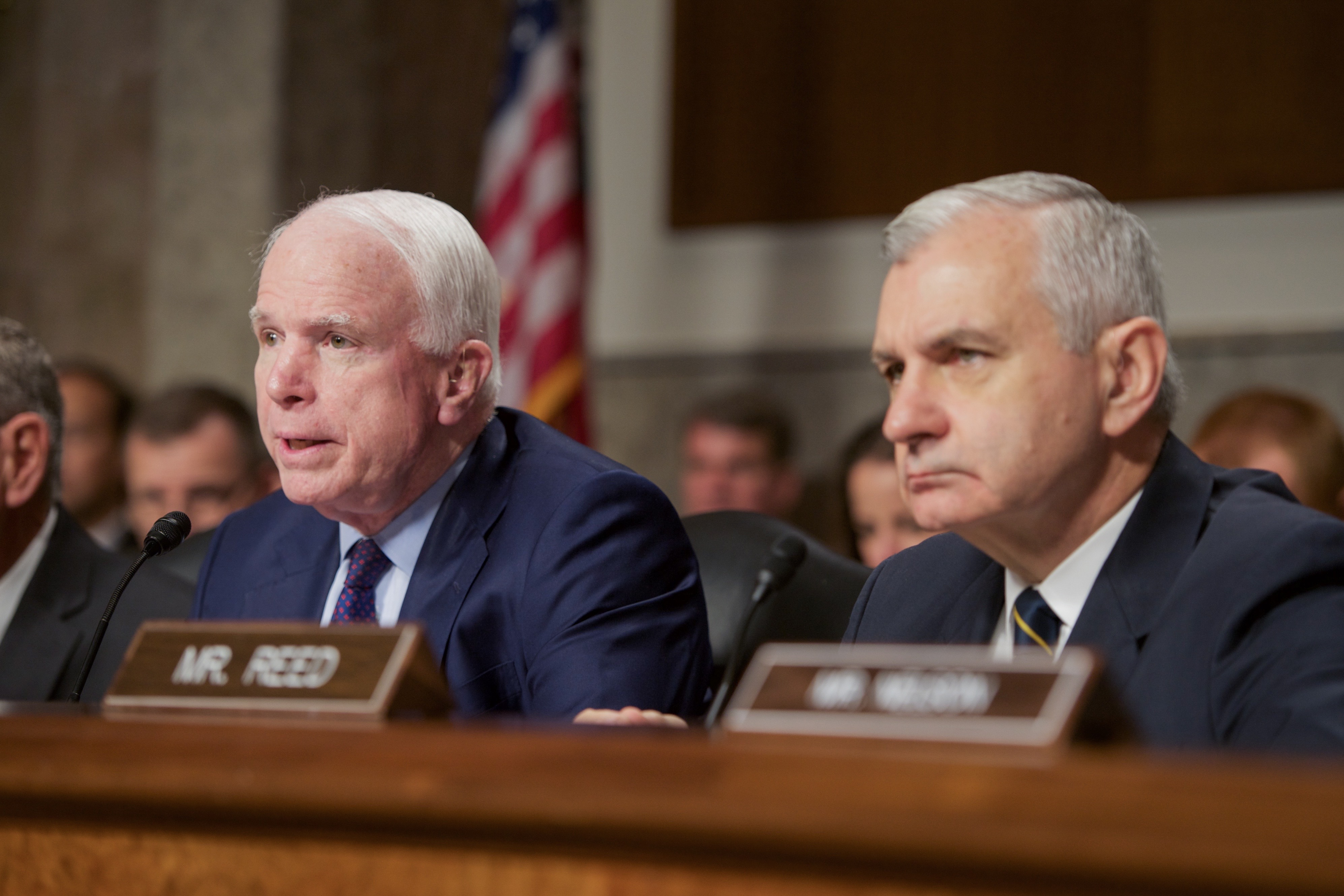
Senators John McCain (Republican of Arizona), the committee chair, and Jack Reed (Democrat of Rhode Island), the committee ranking member, at a hearing of the Senate Armed Services Committee on the JCPOA, 29 July 2015

Secretary of Defense Ashton Carter, General Martin Dempsey, the chairman of the Joint Chiefs of Staff, Kerry, Moniz, and Lew appeared before the Senate Armed Services Committee. Carter and Dempsey had been invited to testify by Republican Chair John McCain, who opposed the deal. Ranking member Jack Reed stressed the need to independently validate the deal.

Carter assured the committee that the U.S. could employ military force if needed and that he did not expect other Iranian misbehavior to stop, another reason to limit its nuclear program. Dempsey testified that the agreement reduced the chances of a near-term military conflict.

IAEA has confidential technical arrangements with many countries. Some Republican lawmakers called such agreements "secret side deals" that restructured the deal. Cruz introduced an unsuccessful resolution seeking a delay in the review period, arguing that the review period should begin upon receipt of all relevant documents.

State Department spokesman John Kirby responded the P5+1 had been fully briefed and that related questions could be addressed in a classified setting. Various experts lined up on both sides of the controversy.

==== Congressional reactions ====
The Washington Post listed 12 issues raised by U.S. senators including Corker, Bob Menendez, Jim Risch, Marco Rubio, and Ron Johnson, including the efficacy of inspections at undeclared sites; the effectiveness of the snapback sanctions; the significance of limits on enrichment; the significance of IAEA side agreements; the effectiveness of inspections of military sites; the consequences of walking away from an agreement; and the effects of lifting sanctions. (Note: "Much of the criticism of the deal" from opponents in the U.S. Congress and from the Israeli government "derives from the fact that slowing and shrinking Iran's nuclear program this way falls well short of the original diplomatic goal, which was to end entirely Iran's ability to enrich uranium—the 'zero enrichment' goal". Before the JCPOA, there was "a preference on the part of the United States and many of its allies for zero enrichment in Iran (indeed, opposition to the spread of any uranium enrichment capability to any additional countries has been long-standing U.S. policy and an important nonproliferation principle)", although "the potential to discuss with Iran the conditions under which it could continue enrichment is not new" and was "built into the proposals that the P5+1 have offered Iran since 2006, spanning the George W. Bush and Barack Obama administrations". Some commentators, such as Michael Singh of the Washington Institute for Near East Policy (writing in 2013), argued for a "zero enrichment" approach: i.e., that no agreement contemplating any enrichment by Iran should be made. This was also the position of Senator Bob Menendez of New Jersey, who introduced the Nuclear Weapons Free Iran Act, a proposed bill (not enacted) which would require that Iran reduce its uranium enrichment to zero before an agreement is made. Other commentators have said that "zero enrichment" has long been an implausible goal, including R. Nicholas Burns of Harvard's Belfer Center, the Under Secretary of State for Political Affairs and leading figure on Iranian nuclear matters during the second Bush administration, said that this was implausible given that Iran has 19,000 centrifuges, stating: "If I could get an ideal solution, or you could, where the Iranians submitted to every demand we had, I would take that. In a real world, you have to make real-world decisions." Similarly, Michael A. Levi of the Maurice R. Greenberg Center for Geoeconomic Studies at the Council on Foreign Relations argued in the August–September 2011 edition of the journal Survival, "it is far from clear that zero enrichment is a realistic goal" and stated, "the goal of current U.S. policy, even if it is not typically articulated this way", is "limited enrichment, in which Iran has some non-trivial enrichment capability, but is unable to produce a bomb (or small arsenal) without risking strong international retaliation, including military destruction of its enrichment infrastructure". Similar arguments have been advanced by Mark Jansson, adjunct fellow at the Federation of American Scientists (who wrote in October 2013 in The National Interest, "there is nothing clear-eyed or realistic about the demand for zero enrichment" and "nor is it technically necessary" to prevent proliferation) and George Perkovich, director of the Nonproliferation Program at the Carnegie Endowment for International Peace (who argued in January 2014 in Foreign Affairs, "the complete elimination of Iran's nuclear fuel cycle program" is not "an achievable goal" and what is needed is "not the cessation of Iran's nuclear enrichment but its capacity to create a nuclear weapon quickly").)

Republican leaders vowed to kill the agreement.

One area of disagreement was the consequences of walking away, and whether renegotiation was a realistic option. Schumer, an opponent, called for retaining and strengthening sanctions, and to continue negotiating. President Obama argued that renegotiation was unrealistic, that the Iranian people would see further concessions as "total surrender of their sovereignty", and that other countries would not continue to support the existing sanctions regime. Senator Al Franken accepted the claim that no better deal was feasible. (Note: Scholars differ on whether a "better deal" from the American point of view is realistic. Stephen M. Walt of Harvard, writing an article titled "The Myth of the Better Deal" in Foreign Policy magazine, argued that the idea of an achievable better deal is "magical thinking" that is at odds with the facts and "ignores Diplomacy 101". Albert Carnesale of Harvard's Belfer Center wrote, "there is no real alternative that would serve the interests of the United States and our allies and friends as well as the deal that is now before Congress. A 'better deal' is unachievable; a military solution is unrealistic (and probably would be counterproductive); and an international agreement without U.S. participation is less attractive than an agreement in which the United States has a strong voice in resolving of issues that might arise." Conversely, Robert Satloff of the Washington Institute for Near East Policy argues, "a better deal with Iran is possible," and that congressional rejection of the agreement would not immediately result in the collapse of the JCPOA or military action, and law professor Orde Kittrie of Arizona State University argued that Congress could send the JCPOA back for renegotiation.) Representative Sander M. Levin announced his support. Senator Cardin said that if the agreement were implemented, the U.S. should increase military aid to Israel and friendly Gulf states. Senator Bill Nelson and Foreign Relations Committee members Tim Kaine and Barbara Boxer announced their support.

The Associated Press reported that the classified U.S. Intelligence Community assessment concluded the agreed inspection regime would diminish Iran's ability to conceal a covert weapons program. Ten active and former Democratic members of the House Select Committee on Intelligence (including Minority Leader Nancy Pelosi and Intelligence Committee ranking member Adam Schiff) cited this assessment, which was available for members of Congress to read, as a reason to support the agreement.

==== Congressional votes ====
A resolution of disapproval was initially expected to pass both the House and Senate.

Two-thirds of both houses are required to override a presidential veto. On 20 August 2015, Pelosi claimed that House Democrats had the votes to sustain a veto of a resolution of disapproval. By 20 August, about 60 House Democrats had announced their support, versus about 12 opponents.

By early September 2015, 34 senators had confirmed their support, ensuring that the Senate could sustain a veto. This proved to be moot, since by 8 September, all senators had announced their commitments, with 42 in support (40 Democrats and two independents) and 58 opposed (54 Republicans and four Democrats). Without 60 votes on either side, the other could filibuster any resolution. A key part of obtaining even limited support came during an August 2015 meeting at which top diplomats from the UK, Russia, China, Germany, and France told 10 undecided Democratic senators they had no intention of returning to negotiations.

Initially, the House leadership planned to vote on a resolution of disapproval. (Note: A similar resolution of disapproval was introduced on 16 July by Representative Peter Roskam, Republican of Illinois, who announced on 3 August that he had obtained 218 cosponsors (a majority of the House). But Roskam's resolution "is not the formal disapproval measure that the House is expected to take up in September"; and it was expected that it is the resolution by Royce, as the relevant committee chair, will be the one ultimately voted upon. Ultimately, neither resolution was voted upon.) Speaker John Boehner instead chose to advance a resolution of approval to force Democratic supporters to formally register their views. On 11 September 2015 the resolution of approval failed on a 162–269 vote; 244 Republicans and 25 Democrats voted no, while 162 Democrats and no Republicans voted yes. The same day, Congress passed resolutions claiming that the requirements of a congressional review period were not met (by party-line vote) and that that would prevent the U.S. from lifting any sanctions (all Republicans and two Democrats in favor).

Public opinions

The discussion extended to the wider public. Major campaign donors took sides, with opponents (Sheldon Adelson, Paul Singer, and Haim Saban) outspending supporters (Ploughshares Fund, Rockefeller Brothers Fund, George Soros, S. Daniel Abraham, Tim Gill, Norman Lear, Margery Tabankin, and Arnold Hiatt) by millions of dollars.

Some groups welcomed the JCPOA, such as the National Iranian American Council (NIAC), and Iranian American Bar Association.

Public letters of support abounded (often bipartisan):

- 73 Middle East and foreign affairs scholars supported the deal. Signatories included John Esposito, Ehsan Yarshater, Noam Chomsky, Peter Beinart, John Mearsheimer, and Stephen Walt.
- More than 100 former U.S. ambassadors and senior State Department officials. Signatories included Daniel C. Kurtzer, James R. Jones, Frank E. Loy, Princeton N. Lyman, Jack F. Matlock Jr., Donald F. McHenry, Thomas E. McNamara, and Thomas R. Pickering.
- Five former U.S. ambassadors to Israel and three former Under Secretaries of State: R. Nicholas Burns, James B. Cunningham, William C. Harrop, Daniel Kurtzer, Thomas R. Pickering, Edward S. Walker Jr., and Frank G. Wisner.
- 60 national-security leaders. Republican signatories included Paul O'Neill, Carla Anderson Hills, William Perry, and Nancy Landon Kassebaum. Democrats included Madeleine Albright, George J. Mitchell, Tom Daschle, Carl Levin. Others included Zbigniew Brzezinski, Brent Scowcroft, R. Nicholas Burns, Thomas R. Pickering; Ryan Crocker, Stuart Eizenstat; Eric T. Olson, Michele Flournoy, and Robert Einhorn.
- 29 U.S. scientists, mostly physicists, many of whom had held Q clearances and been longtime government advisers. The five primary authors were Richard L. Garwin, Robert J. Goldston, R. Scott Kemp, Rush D. Holt, and Frank N. von Hippel. Six Nobel Prize in Physics laureates co-signed the letter: Philip W. Anderson, Leon N. Cooper, Sheldon L. Glashow, David Gross, Burton Richter, and Frank Wilczek. Other scientists included Siegfried S. Hecker, Freeman Dyson, and Sidney Drell.
- 36 retired military generals and admirals. Signatories included James E. "Hoss" Cartwright, Joseph P. Hoar, Merrill McPeak, and Lloyd W. Newton, Robert G. Gard Jr., Claudia J. Kennedy, Lee F. Gunn, Garland Wright, Joseph Sestak, and Paul D. Eaton.
- 75 arms control and nuclear nonproliferation experts. Signers included Valerie Plame, Joseph C. Wilson, Hans Blix; Morton H. Halperin; and experts from the Brookings Institution, Stimson Center, and other think tanks.
- 26 Jewish leaders supported the deal; signers included three former chairs of the Conference of Presidents of Major American Jewish Organizations as well as former AIPAC executive director Tom Dine.
- 340 rabbis organized by Ameinu. Signers included Sharon Brous, Burton Visotzky, Nina Beth Cardin, Lawrence Kushner, Sharon Kleinbaum, and Amy Eilberg.
- 11 Democratic Jewish former members of Congress. Signatories included Levin, Barney Frank, Mel Levine, Steve Rothman, and Robert Wexler.

Public letters from opponents included:

- 200 retired generals and admirals. Signers included Leon A. "Bud" Edney, James A. Lyons, William G. Boykin, and Thomas McInerney.

U.S. pro-Israel lobby groups were divided. American Israel Public Affairs Committee spent millions opposing it. J Street came out in support, and planned a $5 million advertising effort. In the first week of August J Street launched a $2 million, three-week ad campaign in support of the agreement, with TV ads in Colorado, Maryland, Michigan, Oregon, and Pennsylvania.

Leaders of the Reform Jewish movement stayed neutral.

Conversely, in late August a group of 900 rabbis signed an open letter by Kalman Topp and Yonah Bookstein calling upon Congress to reject the agreement. The Orthodox Union and American Jewish Committee also announced opposition to the agreement.

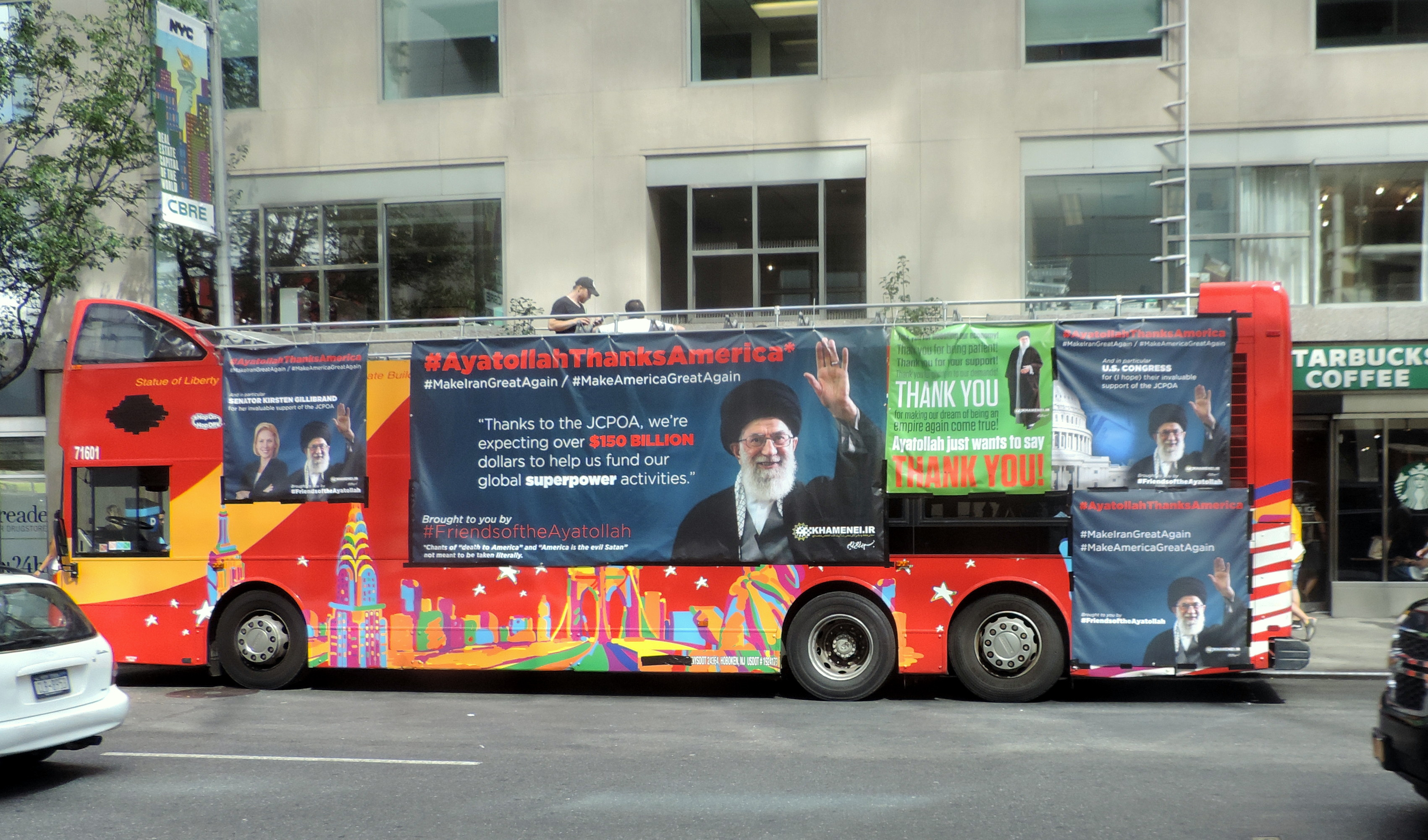
Anti-JCPOA bus advertisement in New York City. The bus ad was sponsored by New York Assemblyman Dov Hikind, an opponent of the agreement.

United Against Nuclear Iran (UANI) and Citizens for a Nuclear Free Iran (CNFI) opposed the deal, although the group's president and co-founder, nonproliferation expert Gary Samore, disagreed. Foundation for American Security and Freedom and Veterans Against the Deal ran opposing ads.

Supporters included MoveOn.org, Americans United for Change, and Global Zero. Iran Project, and the United Nations Association of the U.S.supported the agreement. Colin Powell expressed support.

Retired U.S. Senators Carl Levin and John Warner published a supporting op-ed. Retired Republican Richard Lugar and Democrat J. Bennett Johnston wrote in support of the agreement.

Foreign diplomats joined the debate. Israeli ambassador to the U.S. Ron Dermer was an opponent. European ambassadors including Sir Peter Westmacott supported it.

The Roman Catholic Church expressed support, led by Bishop Oscar Cantú.

Michael Mandelbaum claimed that nonproliferation ultimately depended on deterrence, not agreements. Alan Dershowitz claimed that the involvement of Russia and China made the deal irrelevant.

=== European Union ===
On the same day that the S.C. approved its resolution, the E.U. formally approved the JCPOA via a vote of the E.U. Foreign Affairs Council (the group of E.U. foreign ministers) meeting in Brussels. This set into motion the lifting of certain E.U. sanctions, including those prohibiting the purchase of Iranian oil. The E.U. continued its sanctions relating to human rights and prohibiting the export of ballistic missile technology.

=== Adoption Day ===
On 18 October 2015 E.U. High Representative Mogherini and Iranian Foreign Minister Zarif jointly announced "Adoption Day".

On 20 September 2015, Director-General Yukiya Amano of the IAEA went to the Parchin missile production facility, along with Director of Safeguards Tero Varjoranta, to obtain clarifications on the site's nuclear activities. The next day, Amano professed satisfaction with the samples submitted by the Iranians to the IAEA. IAEA experts were not physically present during the sampling, but Amano said the procedure met "strict agency criteria". In June 2016, IAEA investigators reported that they had reported traces of uranium found at the Parchin facility in December 2015.

=== Implementation Day ===
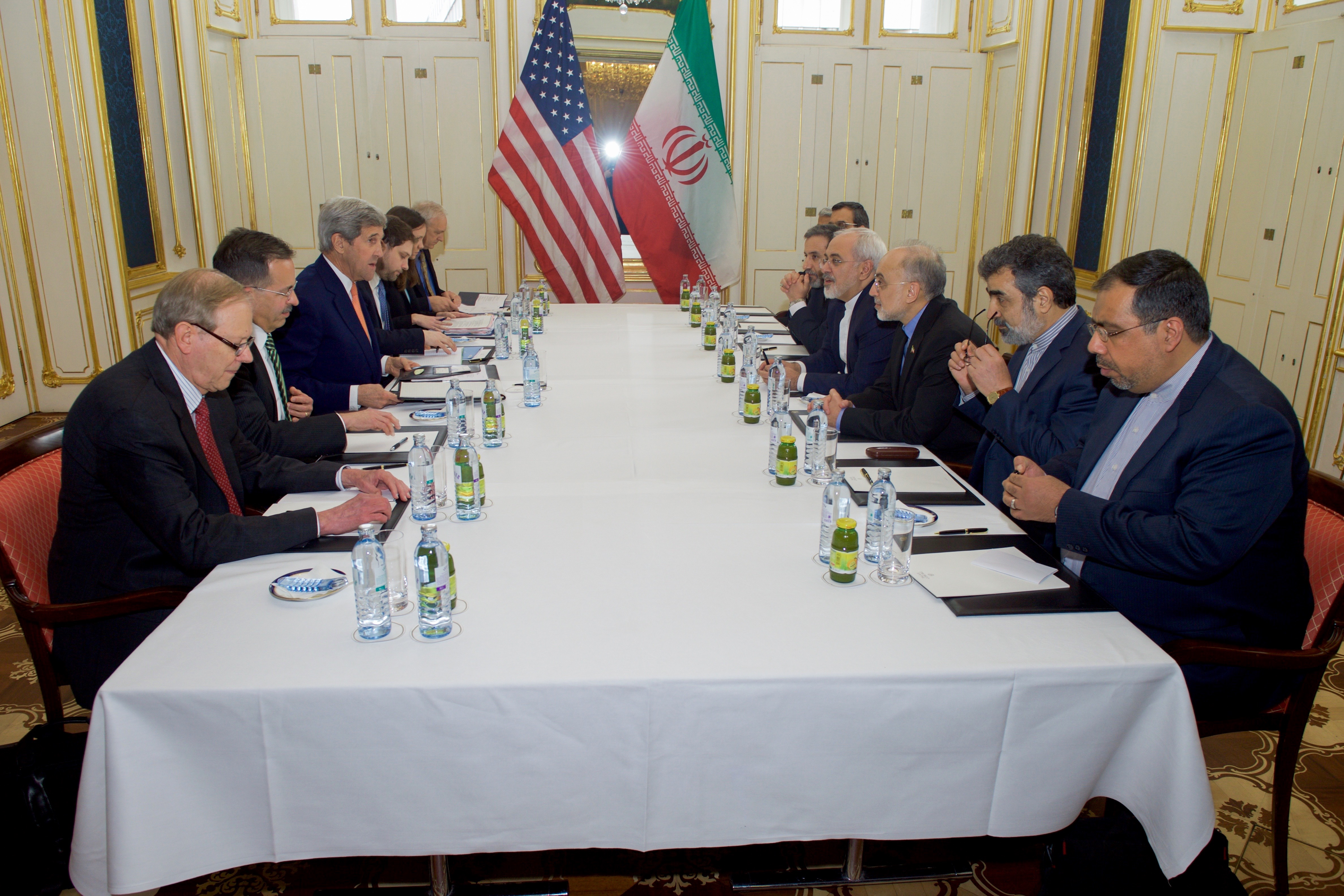
Last meeting between diplomatic teams of Iran and the U.S., at the Palais Coburg Hotel in Vienna

After the IAEA certified that Iran had met the relevant JCPOA requirements, all nuclear sanctions were lifted by the UN, the E.U. and the U.S. on 16 January 2016, "Implementation Day".

That day Washington imposed sanctions on 11 companies and individuals for supplying Iran's ballistic missile program. According to Kerry, $1.7 billion in debt with interest was to be paid to Tehran. But some Iranian financial institutions, including Ansar Bank, Bank Saderat, Bank Saderat PLC, and Mehr Bank, remained on the SDN List and U.S. sanctions with respect to Iran, including existing terrorism, human rights and ballistic missiles-related sanctions, remained in effect.

=== Status in U.S. law ===
In a letter to then Representative Mike Pompeo, the State Department wrote that the JCPOA "is not a treaty or an executive agreement, and is not a signed document".

According to the Congressional Research Service, different definitions of "treaty" are used in international and U.S. law. Referring to the Vienna Convention on the Law of Treaties, "The term 'treaty' has a broader meaning under international law than under domestic law. Under international law, 'treaty' refers to any binding international agreement. Under domestic U.S. law, 'treaty' signifies only those binding international agreements that have received the advice and consent of the Senate."

=== Deterrence ===
Michael Eisenstadt, Director of the Military and Security Studies Program at the Washington Institute for Near East Policy, wrote that deterrence must remain the "core imperative" for U.S. policy. Einhorn wrote that maintaining a credible deterrent was essential.

Obama stated that the U.S. would continue its policy of deterring any Iranian efforts to develop nuclear weapons, including via military force. Flexibility meant that Obama rejected specifying "the penalties for smaller violations of the accord" in advance.

Dennis Ross and David Petraeus said that deterrence including military force was essential to preventing Iran from nuclear weapons and called on Obama to clearly state that policy.

According to Khamenei, his fatwa and not JCPOA was the reason Iran would not acquire nuclear weapons.

== Subsequent developments ==
=== Trump administration (2017) ===
The U.S. certified in April 2017 and in July 2017 that Iran was complying with the deal.

On 13 October 2017, US President Donald Trump announced that he would not make the certification required under the Iran Nuclear Agreement Review Act, accusing Iran of violating the spirit of the deal and calling on Congress and international partners to "address the deal's many serious flaws", though he stopped short of terminating the agreement.

Trump left Congress to decide whether to reimpose sanctions. His aides sought to enact rules indicating how the U.S. could reimpose sanctions. Trump listed three items that could provoke the U.S. to reject the deal: intercontinental ballistic missile development, Iranian refusal to extend the constraint period, and evidence that Iran had reduced the time needed to manufacture a bomb to fewer than 12 months.

Rouhani, Theresa May, Emmanuel Macron, Angela Merkel, and European Union foreign policy chief Federica Mogherini said the agreement was working well and that no one country could break it, reconfirming support for the deal. Russian foreign minister Sergey Lavrov confirmed that Iran was in compliance.

In 2018, IAEA inspectors spent an aggregate of 3,000 calendar [person-]days in Iran, installing seals and collecting surveillance camera photos, measurement data, and documents for further analysis. In March 2018, IAEA Director Yukiya Amano said that the organization had verified that Iran was implementing its nuclear-related commitments. On 30 April, the U.S. and Israel said that Iran had not disclosed a past covert nuclear weapons program to the IAEA, as required.

==== Project Cassandra ====
Project Cassandra was a U.S. Drug Enforcement Administration (DEA) initiative launched in 2008 to disrupt Hezbollah's funding networks by targeting its involvement in international drug trafficking and money laundering. The operation uncovered significant links between Hezbollah and organized crime, but its later years were marked by controversy over allegations that enforcement efforts were slowed to protect the JCPOA negotiations—a claim former officials disputed.

=== U.S. withdrawal (May 2018) ===
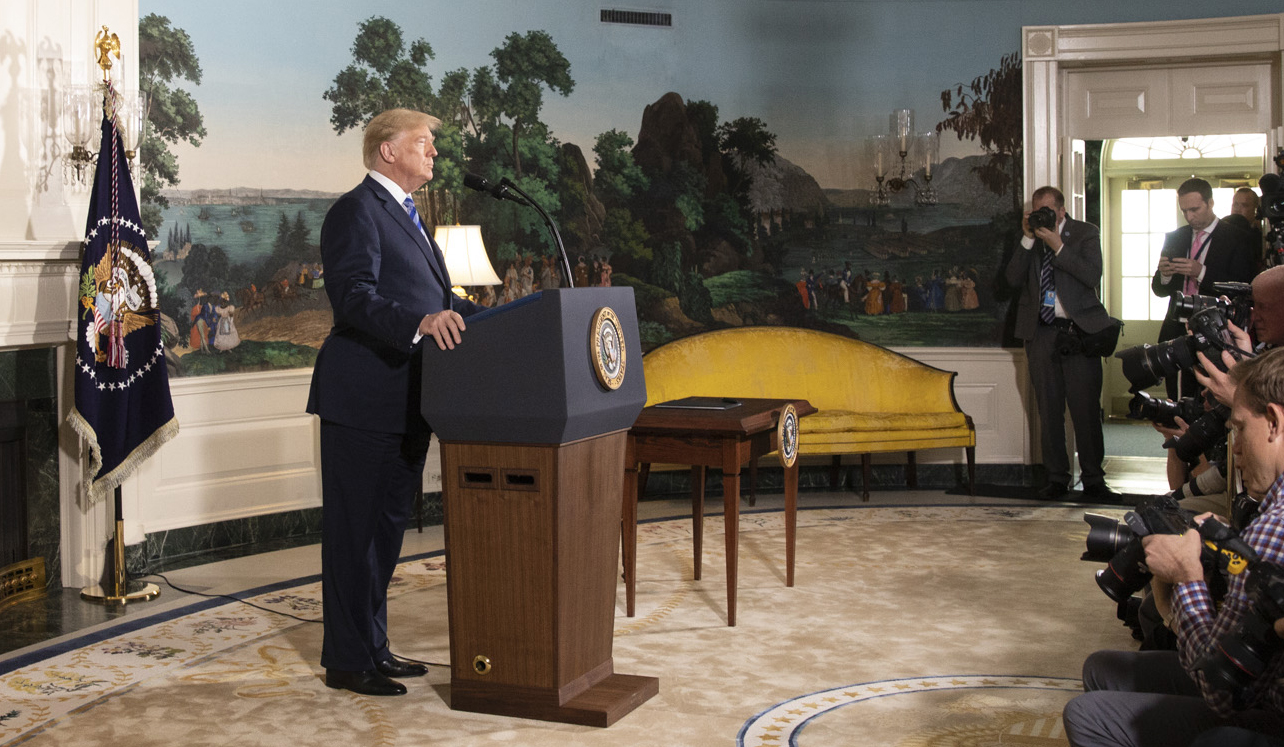
Trump announces U.S. withdrawal on 8 May.

On 8 May 2018, the U.S. officially withdrew from the JCPOA after Trump signed a Presidential Memorandum ordering reinstatement of sanctions. The IAEA continued to certify Iranian compliance. Other signatories said they would comply with the deal even absent the U.S.

I am announcing today that the United States will withdraw from the Iran nuclear deal. In a few moments, I will sign a presidential memorandum to begin reinstating U.S. nuclear sanctions on the Iranian regime. We will be instituting the highest level of economic sanction. Any nation that helps Iran in its quest for nuclear weapons could also be strongly sanctioned by the United States.

— Donald Trump

=== Consequences of U.S. withdrawal ===
The U.S. adopted a policy of "maximum pressure", led by global sanctions.

The Iranian rial fell by 20%, from 35,000 to the dollar to 42,000 in 2021. International banks that traded with Iran paid heavy fines. The U.S. flag was set on fire in Iran's Parliament. According to Israel Defense Forces sources, IRGC Quds Forces based in Syria launched rockets at Israeli military targets the next evening, the first time Iran had directly targeted Israel. All major European companies abandoned doing business with Iran out of fear of U.S. punishment.

=== Iranian demands and European measures ===
Khamenei presented seven conditions for Europe to sustain JCPOA. Among them was that European powers must take steps to preserve business relations with Iranian banks and purchase Iranian oil. He rejected holding discussions about Iran's ballistic missile program and regional activities.

On 7 August 2018, the E.U. enacted a blocking statute to defeat U.S. sanctions on countries trading with Iran. In November 2018, U.S. sanctions came back into effect, intended to force Iran to alter its policies, including its support for militant groups in the region and its development of ballistic missiles.

=== Reactions by Iran (2019) ===
One year after the U.S. withdrawal, Iran took countermeasures. Iran halted its required sales of excess enriched uranium and heavy water to other countries. Rouhani said that Iran would resume enrichment beyond 3.67% if other parties could not let Iran benefit from JCPOA's economic provisions.

In May 2019, IAEA certified that Iran was abiding by the deal's main terms, but raised questions about how many advanced centrifuges Iran was allowed to have, which was only loosely specified in the deal.

On 8 May, Iran announced it would suspend implementation of parts of JCPOA, threatening further action in 60 days absent exemption from U.S. sanctions.

On 1 July 2019, Iran announced that it had breached the limit set on its stockpile of low-enriched uranium, which the IAEA confirmed. On 7 July, Iran announced that it had started to increase uranium enrichment beyond the agreed 3.67% limit. IAEA said its inspectors would verify Iran's actions. Zarif sent a letter to Mogherini notifying her about Iran's noncompliance.

On 4 November, Iran doubled the number of advanced centrifuges it operated. It began enriching uranium to 4.5%. On 5 November 2019, Iranian nuclear chief Ali Akbar Salehi announced that Iran would enrich uranium to 5% at Fordow, adding that it already had the capability to enrich uranium to 20%.

On 5 January 2020, Iran declared that it would no longer abide by the deal's limitations but would continue to coordinate with IAEA.

=== Diplomatic conflict (2020) ===
In 2020, Trump and Pompeo asserted that the U.S. remained a "participant" in the agreement, despite having formally withdrawn, in an effort to persuade the S.C. to reimpose pre-agreement sanctions on Iran for its breaches.

=== Reentry negotiations ===
==== 2021 ====
New U.S. President Joe Biden stated his intention to reinstate the deal. Israeli Prime Minister Naftali Bennett advised against this, saying that stopping Iran's aggression and preventing Iran from building nuclear weapons should be the priority.

In April, talks between the original parties started in Vienna. Biden put the meetings on hold in June. Enrique Mora, E.U. coordinator for reviving negotiations with Iran, attended President Ebrahim Raisi's inauguration. Iran sought E.U. assurances that the U.S. withdrawal would not be repeated. On 14 October, Iran and the E.U. agreed to further negotiations. Iranian deputy foreign minister Ali Bagheri reiterated Mora's statement that "the E.U. was ready to collaborate with Iran and the other parties".

A joint statement by French, German, U.K., and U.S. leaders on 30 October welcomed Biden's interest in reestablishing JCPOA. Talks resumed on 29 November, with representatives from Iran, China, France, Germany, Russia, and the U.K.

Bagheri presented Iran's draft. Western negotiators rejected it. Iranian negotiators insisted that the U.S. lift all sanctions before Iran would scale back its nuclear program. On 9 December, negotiations continued, with Russia and China pushing Iran to revise its stance.

==== 2022 ====
On 20 February, 250 members of the 290-member Iranian parliament, which had been controlled by hardliners since 2020, issued a statement urging Raisi to comply with their requirements for reestablishing JCPOA.

The U.S. engaged in indirect talks with Iran, mediated by China, Russia and E.U. JCPOA revival became a priority for the Biden administration when the Russian invasion of Ukraine spiked global energy prices. JCPOA would add about a million barrels/day of Iranian oil to the international market, which would lower crude oil prices.

Throughout the year, leaders on both sides made statements assessing the state of talks. Points of contention included:

- the IAEA investigation about undeclared materials from three nuclear sites;
- the presence of IRGC on the list of terrorist organizations;
- Russian demands to explicitly protect its economic relations with Iran (eventually Russia received U.S. guarantees to protect its trade with Iran from international sanctions);
- additional sanctions relief.

By May, talks had stalled. On 7 May, Mora visited Iran to restart them.

In June, Tehran said it was removing 27 U.N. surveillance cameras.

On 16 June, the Biden administration announced sanctions against Iran's petrochemical industry. On 6 July, the U.S. initiated legal proceedings against entities based in Singapore, Vietnam, and the United Arab Emirates for evading sanctions.

In July, indirect talks between the U.S. and Iran failed.

In August European negotiators presented a "final" text, after another round. The draft did not include removal of the IRGC's terrorism designation.

In September, Iran increased its oil exports to China, circumventing sanctions.

A delegation visited Tehran on 18 December to discuss the nuclear material discovered at three sites. Earlier Iran reported it had enriched uranium to its highest level of 60%, one step away from weapons grade.

On 20 December, a meeting was held in Amman, Jordan.

The IAEA censured Iran twice in 2022 for failing to cooperate.

==== 2023 ====
An IAEA report on the Fordow Uranium Enrichment Plant found that two cascades of IR-6 centrifuges were configured in a way "substantially different" from what Iran had previously declared. Iran claimed the difference was due to a human error. On 31 January, the U.S. State Department authorized a sanctions waiver, which allowed Russia to develop the enrichment site, a move that some criticized because it allowed Iran to develop its nuclear program with Russian-state controlled firms.

On 4 March, Grossi met with Raisi and other top Iranian officials. Earlier, IAEA had detected uranium particles enriched up to 83.7% at Fordow. In the meantime, Iran gave assurances that it would reinstall monitoring equipment at sensitive locations.

In early June, European powers resumed internal talks. Preliminary negotiations with France, Germany, the U.K., and Ali Bagheri Kani again took place in Oslo. A U.S. State Department official acknowledged that direct connections had been under way, the first since 2018. Both sides had released prisoners accused of espionage and terrorism.

On 18 June, indirect talks between Iran and the U.S. began in Oman after the U.S. allowed the release of blocked Iraqi payments to Iran. On 4 July, Iran-Iraq Joint Chamber of Commerce chairman Yahya Ale Eshaq confirmed the release of $10 billion, to be used for unsanctioned goods. This allowed Iran to double its trade with Iraq. As a consequence, IAEA imposed no additional punitive measures on Iran, as European allies saw no benefit. Israel said it opposed "mini-agreements" with Iran, as well as the original agreement.

In late August, after months of negotiations, first in Oman and then with Qatari officials in New York, agreements between the U.S. and Iran led to a gradual easing of sanctions on Iranian oil sales, particularly for eastern markets such as China. Iranian oil sales reached their highest since 2018, allowing prices to drop below $85 a barrel. Skeptical analysts claimed this was simply to keep U.S. gasoline prices in check for the 2024 election. The U.S. State Department insisted on continued sanctions enforcement, while some reports indicated that Iran was slowing its uranium enrichment. Iranian oil production reached 3 million barrels per day in July, with a further increase to at least 3.4 million barrels in August.

In late August, IAEA confirmed that Iran had slowed its program to enrich uranium to 60%. Concurrently, the sale of Iranian crude increased. Some oil sanctions were lifted.

In the first week of September, the U.S. State Department officially released $6 billion in frozen assets and finalized an exchange of five prisoners each. The funds could be used only for unsanctioned goods.

A September IAEA report confirmed an enrichment slowdown, but claimed that no reporting progress had been made and that the camera equipment at the enrichment site remained inaccessible.

In mid-September, the IAEA/Iran relationship further deteriorated when Iran rejected IAEA nuclear inspectors. This was formally permitted by Iran's safeguards agreement.

On 18 September, Raisi spoke at the U.N. General Assembly and said that Iran would never give up its right to peaceful nuclear energy. He urged Western powers to return to the nuclear deal. Israel left the assembly hall in protest.

In October, Qatar and the U.S. put Iran's access to blocked funds on hold due to the Gaza war, although Iran denied any involvement in the attack.

==== 2024 ====
Additional sanctions were imposed on the Iranian aviation sector due to its involvement with exports of missile components to Russia. Iran denied any deliveries. An IAEA report confirmed the expansion of Iran's enrichment program. Fordow was routinely enriching uranium to 60%. The report said that Iran informed the agency that eight clusters of advanced IR-6 centrifuges had been installed at the site but not brought online. The larger site at Natanz added 15 cascades, allowing an enrichment purity of 5%. IAEA board resolutions required Iran to cooperate with its investigations into uranium traces and called for inspectors to enter nuclear sites.

AEOI spokesman Behrouz Kamalvandi met with representatives of Russia's Joint Institute for Nuclear Research to exchange technical details.

On 13 November, IAEA director Rafael Grossi visited Tehran, where he was welcomed by Behrouz Kamalvandi, spokesman for the Atomic Energy Organization of Iran (AEOI). Grossi, holding talks with Foreign Minister Abbas Araghchi and AEOI Chief Mohammad Eslami, had earlier said the JCPOA was an "empty shell" but that IAEA inspectors had no evidence that Iran was building a nuclear bomb. During the COP29 climate summit in Baku, he warned that "the international situation is becoming increasingly tense".

==== 2025 ====
In February 2025, Khamenei criticized the JCPOA, saying the Iranian team had been too generous and the U.S. had failed to uphold its commitments and ultimately withdrew from the deal. He said the JCPOA left a constant threat hanging over Iran (the snapback mechanism). He concluded that negotiating with such a government "is neither wise, nor intelligent, nor honorable".

In September 2025, the UN security council rejected a resolution by China and Russia to delay "snapback sanctions" triggered by France, the UK, and Germany. European powers still adhere to agreements set forth by the JCPOA, and demand direct negotiations between Iran and the U.S. At the same time, Iran has welcomed IAEA inspectors to control the remaining undamaged nuclear sites. Iran has called the snapback sanctions "procedurally flawed" because they rely on terms of the 2015 agreement long abandoned by the U.S. Russia called the reimposition of sanctions "clumsy blackmail" and dismissed it as "null and void".

Also in September 2025, Iran signed a $25 billion agreement with Russia to build four nuclear power reactors in Sirik, Iran. The Generation III reactors are expected to produce 5 GW of electricity. Iran, which suffers power shortages at times of high demand, currently has one operating nuclear power plant, in Bushehr. Also built by Russia, it has a capacity of 1 GW. On 28 September, UN sanctions were officially reimposed on Iran.

On 10 September 2025, Grossi reached a confidential agreement with Araghchi in Cairo on practical steps to restore safeguards implementation. In November 2025, Araghchi said Iran was no longer enriching uranium. On 30 November 2025 the IAEA Board of Governors adopted a resolution asking the Director General to report on implementation of the UN Security Council resolutions that were reimposed by the snapback, and said that "Iran must ... provide the agency without delay with precise information on nuclear material accountancy and safeguarded nuclear facilities in Iran, and grant the agency all access it requires to verify this information." Iran responded by declaring the Cairo agreement null and void. In December 2025, Grossi told an Austrian newspaper that IAEA inspectors remained in Iran but were unable to access damaged facilities in Natanz, Isfahan, and Fordo.

On 28 September 2025, UN sanctions were officially reimposed on Iran. China and Russia rejected snapback sanctions.

=== Twelve-Day War and its aftermath ===
The IAEA estimated that Iran stockpiled the following amounts of enriched uranium by 12 June 2025:

- 440.9 kg enriched to up to 60%
- 184.1 kg enriched to up to 20%
- 6,024.4 kg enriched to up to 5%
- 2,391.1 kg enriched to up to 2%.

IAEA chief Raphael Grossi said he believed "a bit more than 200 kg" of the 60% stock is stored at a tunnel complex ‌in Isfahan, largely unharmed by the June attacks, confirming previous reports that most of the enriched uranium stored underground survived the attacks. Those stockpiles have become Iran's major bargaining chip in negotiating a truce with the U.S.

On 13 June 2025, Israel attacked Iran. According to the IAEA, Iran did not disclose "traces of uranium", which led to the conclusion that Iran might have developed nuclear weapons. The lack of support for the initial resolution complicated enforcement agreements. The Trump administration's inability to craft a new agreement with Iran has been viewed by some commentators as a major setback for U.S. foreign policy. According to the UN, Iran's nuclear programme was "exclusively peaceful", per the terms of the JCPOA, but inspectors later said they had been "unable to determine whether Iran's nuclear programme was exclusively peaceful". According to a June 2025 IAEA report, there had been no indication of a physical attack on the underground cascade hall containing part of the Pilot Fuel Enrichment Plant at Fordow and the main Fuel Enrichment Plant, but a power loss due to the attack might have caused the centrifuges there to malfunction.

On 21 June 2025, the U.S. bombed three Iranian nuclear sites, Fordow, Natanz, and Isfahan, and claimed it had totally destroyed them, but according to Iranian news agencies, all three locations had been abandoned and equipment moved elsewhere. Damage to the deep underground Fordow site could not be confirmed, and no release of radioactive materials was reported. Iranian nuclear facilities are under IAEA routine inspection, and the atomic agency strongly discouraged military attacks on these facilities.

In September 2026, the IAEA said it could no longer verify the size, composition or location of Iran's enriched uranium stockpile because inspectors had been denied access to the country's main enrichment facilities since June 2025. The IAEA said it was also unable to determine whether Iran had suspended enrichment, what centrifuges it possessed, or the status of a fourth enrichment facility near Isfahan that Iran had announced in 2025. Grossi described the lack of access as an urgent proliferation concern and urged Iran to admit inspectors.

== See also ==
- Islamabad Memorandum
- 2016 United States–Iran naval incident
- Agreed Framework
- Begin Doctrine (The common term for the Israeli government's preventive strike to the potential enemies' capability to possess WMD)
- Black Cube (a private intelligence company founded by former Israeli intelligence officers)
- Budapest Memorandum
- Iraq disarmament crisis
- Elimination of Libya's WMD programs
- Iran–United States relations during the Obama administration
- Mehdi Sarram
- United Nations Security Council resolutions concerning the nuclear program of Iran
  - United Nations Security Council Resolution 2231
- Executive Order 12170
- History and culture of negotiation in Iran
- 2026 United States military buildup in the Middle East
