= History and culture of negotiation in Iran =

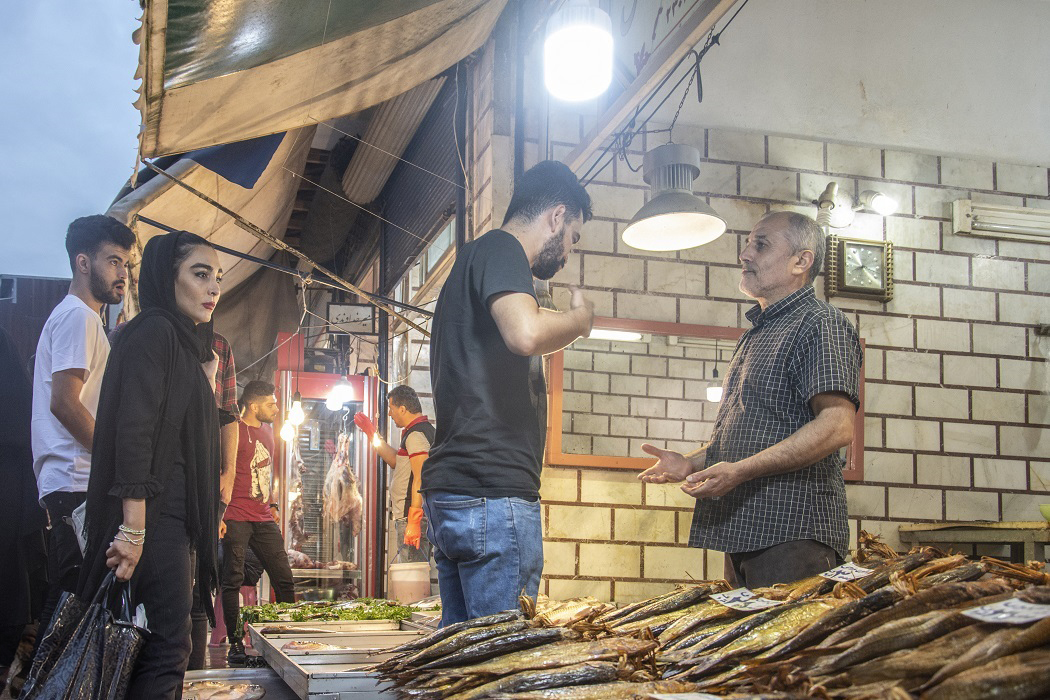
Locals bargaining at a fish stall in the Bandar Abbas market

Iran's post-1979 foreign policy has been shaped by cultural practices. Concepts like taarof (ritualized politeness), national pride, and a patient, endurance-based outlook, shape Iranian diplomacy. In practice, this means Iranian leaders often approach talks as a test of resolve, wiliness and prestige. Iranians typically see negotiations as prolonged contests rather than win-win deals, and expect to demonstrate dignity and resolve.

== Key concepts ==
=== Taarof (ceremonial politeness) ===
In Iranian culture, taarof is a complex etiquette of offering and refusing that can confuse outsiders. Diplomatically, it often appears as exaggerated civility: an Iranian official may initially decline an offer several times or couch demands in elaborate flattery. Anthropologists note that taarof encourages courtesy and avoidance of directness, with practices like repeated offers or hesitations in conversations. While this ritual can build goodwill among Iranians, Western negotiators sometimes misinterpret it.

=== National pride and honor ===
Iranian officials frame many diplomatic goals as matters of national dignity. For example, Iran's Supreme Leader has repeatedly declared that its uranium enrichment is "a matter of national pride" (and thus non-negotiable). Analysts note that "all Iranians across the political spectrum take great pride in the enrichment program," and domestic pressure makes conceding it politically costly. More generally, Iran's leaders are careful to avoid any deal that might appear humiliating. National pride means that, in negotiations, Iranian teams are expected to present an image of strength and resolve. Concessions are often deferred until the last possible moment, so the regime can claim "victory" in any agreement.

=== Strategic patience ===
Iranian culture and religious tradition emphasize endurance and patience as core virtues, particularly influencing diplomatic strategies and negotiation behavior. Iranian negotiators demonstrate traits such as persistence, pragmatic realism, and calculated patience in diplomatic settings. Iranian negotiators frequently perceive prolonged negotiations as beneficial, operating under the assumption that extended dialogues can alter circumstances in their favor, reflecting deeply rooted Shiite beliefs about the virtue and efficacy of patience. This strategic patience enables Iran to endure sanctions and protracted diplomatic processes in pursuit of long-term goals. Analysts consistently describe Iran's approach as one characterized by deliberate ambiguity and delay, utilizing negotiations strategically to gain time and probe the resolve of opposing parties. Iranian leadership regularly signals its intention to outlast external pressure, a diplomatic maneuver often referred to as "Persian patience", awaiting shifts in global power dynamics or favorable domestic political conditions.

== Negotiation style and tactics ==
=== Protracted and complex bargaining ===
The Persian proverb "Muddy the waters, and you'll be able to catch the fish" illustrates a common Iranian negotiation tactic: to prolong discussions, obscure intentions, and exhaust the other party before reaching an agreement. This approach is designed to gain the upper hand by wearing opponents down and maximizing concessions.

=== Defensive posture and mistrust ===
Iranian negotiators often approach talks from a position of mistrust, shaped by a history of foreign intervention and a sense of being under siege. This leads to a defensive, loss-minimizing stance, with a high tolerance for risk and a willingness to hold out for better terms.

=== Cleverness and rhetorical skills ===
The concept of zerangi (cunning or cleverness) is highly valued. Iranian negotiators may use discourse manipulation, threats, bluffing, and disinformation as legitimate tactics. Demonstrating rhetorical skill and outmaneuvering opponents is a source of pride and social capital.

=== Bazaar tradition ===
The Iranian approach to negotiation is often compared to the traditional bazaar, where haggling is an art form. This includes entering into detailed negotiations even on issues that may not be deliverable, as a way to test the other side and gather information.

== Historical negotiation episodes ==
=== U.S. hostage crisis (1979–1981) ===
The seizure of the US Embassy in Tehran (Nov 1979 - Jan 1981) was both a diplomatic crisis and a cultural test. Initially, the new Iranian regime refused direct talks, insisting on preconditions (like extraditing the Shah) and even making exorbitant demands. For example, during indirect negotiations in late 1980, Iran suddenly tabled a surprise demand for a $24 billion deposit covering frozen Shah-era assets. The Carter administration ultimately ignored what it viewed as unacceptable demands, relying on Algeria to shuttle messages. In the end, the Algiers Accords (January 1981), reached on the eve of Reagan's inauguration, secured the hostages' release. Iran won the unfreezing of about $8 billion in assets and a tribunal for settling claims.

Throughout this ordeal, Iranian negotiators were guided by cultural imperatives. Taking hostages was initially presented as a defense of revolutionary honor, and Iran kept the hostages until it felt it was negotiating from a position of advantage. Publicly, Iranian leaders portrayed the deal as a victory and shrewd endurance of hardship. Western negotiators privately noted Iranian officials' genial but rigid style. To many Americans, the process seemed tortuously slow and enigmatic, a manifestation of tarof and patience. One hostage-taker that turned to diplomat later described how the captors tried to "look like generous hosts," only to retract this courtesy at the last moment, illustrating a blend of hospitality and hard bargaining.

=== Iran–Iraq war ceasefire (1988) ===
After eight years of war, from 1980 to 1988, Iran agreed to a ceasefire brokered by the United Nations on August 20, 1988. This decision surprised many Western observers, as the Iranian government had repeatedly vowed publicly to "fight to the end." However, behind the scenes, Iran had been carefully pursuing diplomatic channels for several years, quietly communicating through allies such as Syria and Oman, even while publicly insisting on total victory.

Culturally, this episode showed how Iranian pride and patience coexisted alongside pragmatism. Iran could claim it had defended the revolution and exacted material gains (e.g. border stability) before agreeing to peace. The sudden ceasefire announcement was framed domestically as a wise and dignified end to suffering, not a defeat. Outsiders noted that Iran's acceptance came after "years of patient diplomatic efforts," a strategy largely overlooked by Western media.

=== Nuclear negotiations (2003–2015, JCPOA) ===
Iran's nuclear program became an international flashpoint in the 2000s. Negotiations with the P5+1 (U.S., UK, France, China, Russia, Germany) spanned over a decade. From the start, national pride was explicit: Iranian leaders insisted on their "peaceful nuclear rights" and called any abandonment of enrichment unacceptable. For instance, in 2025 Iran's chief negotiator Abbas Araqchi bluntly tweeted: "Zero nuclear weapons = we DO have a deal. Zero enrichment = we do NOT have a deal." Iran leveraged this stance to constrain talks: Western experts noted that every Iranian team member (from reformists to hardliners) felt pressure to defend the enrichment program as a point of pride.

At the same time, Iran employed tarof-like caution and patience. Negotiations were complex and indirect (often using European intermediaries), with Iranian diplomats often speaking in formal, high-context language. Western counterparts frequently complained that Iranian officials gave vague answers and took weeks to respond to proposals, a negotiator's "stalling" strategy. A cultural analysts wrote that Iranian diplomats are "methodical" and "detailed," and their preference for ambiguity lets them avoid committing until the last moment. The long duration of talks (often punctuated by domestic political cycles in both Iran and the U.S.) reflected this protracted style.

Negotiations culminated in the JCPOA (2015). In this deal, Iran agreed to limit enrichment capacity and allow intense inspections, in exchange for lifting many economic sanctions. From the Iranian perspective, the agreement was cast as a triumph of "resistance", proof that perseverance had brought sanctions relief without ceding sovereignty. Official statements emphasized national unity and pride: the regime congratulated itself on defending Iran's interests and insisted no compromise had been made on core rights. In practice, many analysts observe that Iran used the lengthy talks to strengthen its own science and to gradually alleviate international pressure, only conceding gradually when sanctions bite. The outcome was relatively favorable to Iran's leaders: they secured major sanctions relief while preserving the essence of the program, and could claim the deal as a victory of wise endurance rather than capitulation.

=== Post-2018 talks and ongoing diplomacy ===
In 2018 the U.S. withdrew from the JCPOA and reimposed sanctions. Since then, Iran's diplomatic style has remained consistent culturally, but with some tactical shifts. Iranian leaders have pursued what they describe as "maximum patience": they have refused direct talks without preconditions and often responded to proposals indirectly. For example, 2021–2023 rounds of talks with US mediators (via Oman) saw Iran first stall and then issue hardline counter-demands. Tehran's negotiators still insist on rights and "removing all sanctions" as a sine qua non, reflecting national pride. At the same time, they schedule negotiations carefully, often delaying formal responses for months.

Western analysts frequently interpret this approach as deliberate stalling. A recent policy study describes Iran's tactics as "operating discreetly… to shape the information spectrum and protract talks to buy time". Indeed, reports note that Iran took many months to formally reject a draft agreement already provisionally accepted, underscoring their slow-hand tactics. Meanwhile, Iranian media portray their side as cooperative: they frame Iran as ready for "true dialogue," insisting that Tehran has met its obligations (as under the JCPOA) while the other side must show "respect" (for example, by lifting sanctions).

The outcome remains unresolved as of May 2025. Iran continues to enrich at high levels (viewed domestically as rightful insistence) and uses ongoing talks to demonstrate its perseverance. Internationally, observers describe a stalemate: U.S. diplomats worry about "obfuscation and procrastination", while Iranians believe they are simply being patient until the world accepts their terms.

== Evolution and international perception ==
Over four decades, certain patterns have persisted even as Iran's tactics adapt. In the early revolutionary era, Iran often mixed ideology with obstinacy; today it has become somewhat more pragmatic under moderate presidents, yet the cultural underpinnings remain. Across the spectrum, Iranian negotiators expect courtesy and time. Western counterparts have learned to recognize Iranian "cultural baggage": diplomats advise showing patience, insisting on respect, and not forcing speedy decisions in Iranian talks.

Internationally, Iran's style is often viewed with skepticism. In the U.S. and Europe, analysts warn that Iranian politeness can mask intransigence. American officials have been advised to "shine light" on Iran's process to counter the narrative of Iranian intransigence. On the other hand, Iran's friends (e.g. Russia, some regional allies) praise Iran's endurance. In Iranian eyes, their leaders are defending the nation's rights through disciplined negotiation.

== Timeline of major negotiations ==
Period	Negotiation/Event	Outcome & Cultural Notes
1979–1981	U.S. hostage crisis (Tehran) Embassy seizure and Algiers Accords	Hostages freed Jan 1981 in exchange for release of frozen Iranian assets (~$8 billion) and claims tribunaladst.org. Iran's negotiators delayed talks and made high demands (reflecting pride), finally conceding only when they could claim victory. Iranian culture of stoicism and "defeat first" negotiations (talking only after asserting leverage) was evident throughout.
1988 (Aug)	Iran–Iraq war ceasefire UNSC Resolution 598	Iran accepted ceasefire Aug 20, 1988 after 8 years of war. This came after years of patient behind-the-scenes diplomacy. Iran presented the end of war as a dignified decision, emphasizing sacrifice and readiness for peace. Cultural factors: strategic patience (prolonged talks with allies) and finally pragmatism with honor, balancing national pride with war-weariness.
2003–2015	P5+1 nuclear talks (culminating in JCPOA 2015)	After long negotiations, Iran agreed (July 2015) to restrict its enrichment in return for sanction relief. The JCPOA, effective Jan 2016, imposed strict limits on Iran's nuclear program. Throughout talks, Iranians insisted on their right to enrichment (a point of national priderferl.org) while pursuing a drawn-out, indirect dialogue (reflecting taarof-like formality and patience). Outcome: A landmark deal which Iran portrayed as a validation of its negotiating strategy and resilience.
2018–2025	Post-JCPOA and renewed talks U.S. withdrawal; indirect US–Iran talks via mediators	No final accord as of 2025. Iran continues enrichment to various levels while negotiating with P4+1 (and de facto U.S.). Iranian stance: refuse direct talks without preconditions; "persistence" and careful timing of responses (aligning with strategic patience). International perception: efforts seen as stalled by Iranian delays and maximalist demands. Iran emphasizes its steadfast defense of interests, while critics accuse it of "obfuscation and procrastination".
