= Nicholas Kittrie =

American legal scholar (died 2019)

- Died: December 9, 2019
- Education: American University's Washington College of Law
- Occupation: Legal scholar

Nicholas Kittrie (died December 9, 2019) was an American legal scholar. He taught at American University's Washington College of Law for five decades, and he was the president of the American Society of Criminology in 1975.
