= Orde Kittrie =

American academic

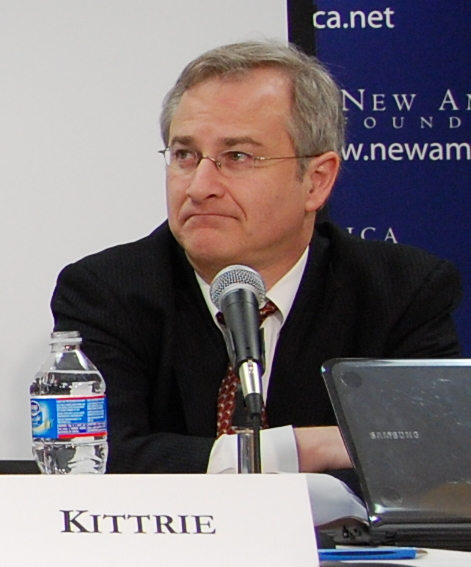
- Kittrie in 2011
- Born: Orde Félix Kittrie
- Occupations: Academic; professor

Academic background
- Education: Walt Whitman High School; Yale University; University of Michigan Law School

Orde Félix Kittrie is a tenured professor of law at Arizona State University, based at its District of Columbia mini-campus, where his teaching and research focus on international law (especially nonproliferation and sanctions) and criminal law. He has written extensively in the areas of international law, criminal law, nuclear non-proliferation, and international negotiations. Kittrie served for many years as the director of ASU's Sandra Day O’Connor College of Law Washington Legal Externship Program. Kittrie was recipient of the 2006-2007 Centennial Professor of the Year award at ASU, a university-wide honor presented in recognition of outstanding teaching inside and outside of the classroom.

Kittrie is the author of Lawfare: Law as a Weapon of War He has published articles in the University of Michigan Law Review, Iowa Law Review, Syracuse University Law Review, University of Michigan Journal of International Law, University of Pennsylvania Journal of International Law, and Case Western Journal of International Law.

Kittrie has published articles in The Wall Street Journal, Foreign Affairs, The National Interest the Washington Post, and Arms Control Today.

Kittrie is an expert on legal issues relating to nuclear nonproliferation. Kittrie has testified on nonproliferation issues before both the U.S. Senate and U.S. House of Representatives. During 2008, Kittrie served on a National Academies of Science committee created by Congress (in the National Defense Authorization Act for Fiscal Year 2008) to issue a report, in time for the next Administration, assessing and making recommendations to improve current U.S. government programs to prevent the proliferation of nuclear, chemical and biological weapons. In February 2008, Kittrie wrote a chapter for a report produced by the National Academies of Science, in coordination with the Russian Academy of Sciences, entitled The Future of the Nuclear Security Environment in 2015. Kittrie’s chapter describes and analyzes several critical legal issues that must be successfully managed if future U.S.-Russian nuclear security cooperation is to be maximized. In 2005, Kittrie served on the National Academies of Science committee which produced with the Russian Academy of Sciences a joint report entitled Strengthening US-Russian Cooperation on Nuclear Nonproliferation, for which Kittrie wrote the chapter on legal obstacles and opportunities.

Kittrie, a Mexican-American, is active in the Latino community, including service in 2006 as President of the Hispanic National Bar Association’s Southwest Region. Kittrie was also named by Hispanic Outlook on Higher Education as one of the United States’ four most notable Hispanic professors of international law. In 2006, he received the Dr. Manuel Servin Faculty Award (2006) from the Chicano Faculty/Staff Association of Arizona State University (an annual award to one faculty member for exemplary mentorship, scholarship and service to the Hispanic community). In 2012, he was honored by the Latino Law Students Association of the University of Michigan Law School with that year's J.T. Canales Award, which honors one “alumnus who has made a significant contribution to empowering the Latino community” each year.
