= List of United Nations Security Council resolutions concerning Iran =

The UN Security Council has passed a number of resolutions concerning Iran, mainly related to its nuclear program.

== List of resolutions ==
- United Nations Security Council Resolution 2 – passed on 30 January 1946. Encouraged Iran and the Soviet Union to resolve their conflict concerning Soviet troops occupying Iranian territory. The Security Council requested to be updated on negotiations between the two sides at any time. Unanimously adopted.
- United Nations Security Council Resolution 3 – passed on April 4, 1946. Acknowledged that the Soviet troops in Iran could not be removed in time to meet their deadline under the Tri-Partite Treaty but requested the Soviet Union remove them as fast as possible and that no member state in any way retard this process. If any developments threaten the withdrawal of troops, the Security Council requested to be informed. Adopted, with both the Soviet Union and Australia not voting on the measure.
- United Nations Security Council Resolution 5 – passed on May 8, 1946. Deferred decisions on Soviet troops in Iran until the Iranian government had time to confer with the Soviet Union and submit a report to the UN regarding all information about Soviet troops in their country. Adopted with the Soviet Union absent.
- United Nations Security Council Resolution 1696 – passed on 31 July 2006. Demanded that Iran suspend all enrichment-related and reprocessing activities and threatened sanctions, invoking Chapter VII of the United Nations Charter to make that demand legally binding on Iran. Adopted by 14 votes with Qatar abstaining.
- United Nations Security Council Resolution 1737 – passed on 23 December 2006 in response to the proliferation risks presented by the Iranian nuclear program and, in this context, by Iran's continuing failure to meet the requirements of the International Atomic Energy Agency Board of Governors and to comply with the provisions of Security Council resolution 1696 (2006). Made mandatory for Iran to suspend enrichment-related and reprocessing activities and cooperate with the IAEA, imposed sanctions banning the supply of nuclear-related materials and technology, and froze the assets of key individuals and companies related to Iran's nuclear and missile programs. It established a committee to monitor sanctions implementation. Adopted unanimously
- United Nations Security Council Resolution 1747 – passed on 24 March 2007. Imposed an arms embargo and expanded the freeze on Iranian assets, welcomed the proposal by the permanent five members of the Security Council plus Germany for resolving issues regarding Iran's nuclear program. Unanimously adopted.
- United Nations Security Council Resolution 1803 – passed on 3 March 2008. Extended the asset freezes and called upon states to monitor the activities of Iranian banks, inspect Iranian ships and aircraft, and to monitor the movement of individuals involved with the program through their territory, impose travel restrictions on sanctioned persons, and bar exports of nuclear- and missile-related dual-use goods to Iran. Adopted by 14 votes with one abstentation.
- United Nations Security Council Resolution 1835 – Passed 27 September 2008, reaffirmed the preceding four resolutions, the only one of the seven not to invoke Chapter VII. Unanimously adopted.
- United Nations Security Council Resolution 1929 – passed on 9 June 2010. Banned Iran from participating in any activities related to ballistic missiles, tightened the arms embargo, travel bans on individuals involved with the program, froze the funds and assets of the Iranian Revolutionary Guard Corps and Islamic Republic of Iran Shipping Lines, and recommended that states inspect Iranian cargo, prohibit the servicing of Iranian vessels involved in prohibited activities, prevent the provision of financial services used for sensitive nuclear activities, closely watch Iranian individuals and entities when dealing with them, prohibit the opening of Iranian banks on their territory and prevent Iranian banks from entering into relationship with their banks if it might contribute to the nuclear program, and prevent financial institutions operating in their territory from opening offices and accounts in Iran. The resolution passed by a vote of 12–2, with Turkey and Brazil voting against and Lebanon abstaining. A number of countries imposed measures to implement and extend these sanctions, including the United States, the European Union, Australia, Canada, Japan, Norway, South Korea, and Russia.
- United Nations Security Council Resolution 1984 – passed on 9 June 2011. This resolution extended the mandate of the panel of experts established by Resolution 1929, that supports the Iran Sanctions Committee for one year. Adopted by 14 votes with Lebanon abstaining.
- United Nations Security Council Resolution 2049 – passed on 7 June 2012. Renewed the mandate of the Iran Sanctions Committee’s Panel of Experts for one year. Unanimously adopted.
- United Nations Security Council Resolution 2105 – Passed 5 June 2013. Renewed the mandate of the Iran Sanctions Committee’s Panel of Experts for one year. Unanimously adopted.
- United Nations Security Council Resolution 2159 – Passed 9 June 2014. Renewed the mandate of the Iran Sanctions Committee’s Panel of Experts for one year.
- United Nations Security Council Resolution 2231 - Passed 20 July 2015. Endorsed the Joint Comprehensive Plan of Action and lifted all previous sanctions on Iran provided that Iran remains in compliance with its responsibilities in the nuclear deal. Unanimously adopted. In 2020 the United States announced plans to revoke the resolution and demand re-imposition of U.N. sanctions on Iran under Paragraph 11 of the JCPOA. The United States could not trigger Paragraph 11 in 2020 because the United States withdrew itself from JCPOA in 2018 and unilaterally re-imposed sanctions on Iran while Iran was in full compliance of JCPOA, verified by consecutive IAEA reports.
