= Timeline of the nuclear program of Iran =

This is the timeline of the nuclear program of Iran.

== 1956–1979 ==
1957: The United States and Iran sign a civil nuclear co-operation agreement as part of the U.S. Atoms for Peace program.

August 9, 1963: Iran signs the Partial Test Ban Treaty (PTBT) and ratifies it on December 23, 1963.

1967: The Tehran Nuclear Research Centre is built and run by the Atomic Energy Organization of Iran (AEOI). In 1967, reflecting their close diplomatic relationship, the United States provided the University of Tehran with a 5-megawatt light-water research reactor. While the facility was intended for scientific and medical use, the move was also gave the United States more ability to monitor Iran’s nuclear activities and prevent the development of military capabilities.

September 1967: The United States supplies 5.545 kilograms (kg) of enriched uranium, of which 5.165 kg contain fissile isotopes for fuel in a research reactor. The United States also supplies 112 grams of plutonium, of which 104 g are fissile isotopes, for use as start-up sources for research reactor.

July 1968: Iran signs the Nuclear Non-Proliferation Treaty and ratifies it. It goes into effect on March 5, 1970.

1970s: Under the rule of Mohammad Reza Shah Pahlavi, plans are made to construct up to 20 nuclear power stations across the country with U.S. support and backing. Numerous contracts are signed with various Western firms, and the West German firm Kraftwerk Union (a subsidiary of Siemens) begins construction on the Bushehr power plant in 1974.

1974: The Atomic Energy Act of Iran was promulgated. The Act covers the activities for which the AEOI was established at that period. These activities included using atomic energy and radiation in industry, agriculture and service industries, setting up atomic power stations and desalination factories, producing source materials needed in atomic industries. This creates the scientific and technical infrastructure required for carrying out the said projects, as well as co-ordinating and supervising all matters pertaining to atomic energy in the country.

1974: The Shah lent $1 billion to the French Atomic Energy Commission to help build the Eurodif uranium processing company in Europe. In exchange, Iran received rights to 10% of the enriched uranium product, a right Iran never exercised. After a bitter legal dispute, the loan was repaid in 1991. Following the passage of United Nations Security Council Resolution 1737 in 2006, UN financial sanctions required France to freeze dividend payments to the AEOI.

1975: Massachusetts Institute of Technology signs a contract with the AEOI to provide training for Iranian nuclear engineers.

1975: Iran buys a 15% interest in the Rössing uranium mine in South West Africa. However, due to international pressure, it is never allowed to collect any uranium from this outside country.

== 1979–1996 ==
1979: Iran's Islamic revolution puts a freeze on the existing nuclear program and the Bushehr contract with Siemens is terminated as the German firm leaves.

1982: Iranian officials announced that they planned to build a reactor powered by their own uranium at the Isfahan Nuclear Technology Centre.

1983: International Atomic Energy Agency (IAEA) inspectors inspect Iranian nuclear facilities, and report on a proposed co-operation agreement to help Iran manufacture enriched uranium fuel as part of Iran's "ambitious program in the field of nuclear power reactor technology and fuel cycle technology." The assistance program is later terminated under U.S. pressure.

1984: Iranian radio announced that negotiations with Niger on the purchase of uranium were nearing conclusion.

1985: Iranian radio programs openly discuss the significance of the discovery of uranium deposits in Iran with the director of the AEOI. Also in this year Iran, Syria and Libya say that they should all develop nuclear weapons to counter the Israeli nuclear threat.

1989: the Radiation Protection Act of Iran was ratified in public session of April 9, 1989 by the Parliament and was approved by the Council of Law-Guardians on April 19, 1989.

1990: Iran begins negotiations with the Soviet Union regarding the re-construction of the Bushehr power plant.

1992: Iran signs an agreement with China for the building of two 950-megawatt reactors in Darkhovin (Western Iran). To date, construction has not yet begun.

1993: China provides Iran with an HT-6B Tokamak fusion reactor that is installed at the Plasma Physics Research Centre of Azad University.

January 1995: Iran signs an $800 million contract with the Russian Ministry of Atomic Energy (MinAtom) to complete a Light water reactor in Bushehr under IAEA safeguards.

1996: China and Iran inform the IAEA of plans to construct a nuclear enrichment facility in Iran, but China withdraws from the contract under U.S. pressure. Iran advises the IAEA that it plans to pursue the construction anyway.

== 2002–2004 ==
August 2002: A spokesman for the People's Mujahedin of Iran group holds a press conference to expose two nuclear facilities in Natanz and Arak.

December 2002: The United States accuses Iran of attempting to make nuclear weapons.

Spring 2003: Iran makes a comprehensive proposal of negotiations with the United States that offers "full transparency for security that there are no Iranian endeavors to develop or possess WMD", joint decisive action against terrorists, coordination on a stable Iraq, coordination on nuclear matters, stop of any material support to Palestinian opposition groups (Hamas, Jihad etc.) resisting Israeli occupation, and a normalization of relationships. The offer is spurned by V.P. Cheney and the Bush administration, which instead criticizes the Swiss ambassador who forwarded the offer.

June 16, 2003: Mohamed ElBaradei, Director General of the International Atomic Energy Agency, declares that "Iran failed to report certain nuclear materials and activities" and requests "co-operative actions" from the country. The International Atomic Energy Agency does not at this time decide to declare Iran in non-compliance with its safeguards agreement under the Non-Proliferation Treaty.

October 21, 2003: As a confidence-building measure, Iran and the EU-3 agree to negotiations under the terms of the Paris Agreement, pursuant to which Iran agrees to temporarily suspend enrichment and permit more stringent set of nuclear inspections in accordance with the Additional Protocol, and the EU-3 explicitly recognizes Iran's right to civilian nuclear programs in accordance with the Non-Proliferation Treaty. The EU-3 submits a demand in August 2005 that Iran abandon enrichment nonetheless.

October 31, 2003: After negotiations with Iran and the U.S. on language in the IAEA document, the IAEA declares that Iran has submitted a "comprehensive" declaration of its nuclear program.

November 11, 2003: The IAEA reports that Iran had many breaches and failures to comply with its safeguards agreement, including a "policy of concealment" from the IAEA, but also states that there is "no evidence" that Iran is attempting to build an atomic bomb.

November 13, 2003: The Bush administration claims that the IAEA conclusion of "no evidence" is "impossible to believe."

December 18, 2003: As agreed in the Paris Agreement, Iran voluntarily signs and implements the Additional Protocol to the Nuclear Non-Proliferation Treaty Though the Protocol was not binding on Iran until ratified, Iran voluntarily agrees to permit expanded and more intensive IAEA inspections pursuant to the Protocol, which fail to turn up a nuclear weapons program in Iran. Iran ends the voluntary implementation of Additional Protocol after two years of inspections, as a protest to continued EU-3 demands that Iran abandon all enrichment.

June 2004: Kamal Kharrazi, Iran's foreign minister, responding to demands that Iran halt its nuclear program, says: "We won't accept any new obligations. Iran has a high technical capability and has to be recognised by the international community as a member of the nuclear club. This is an irreversible path."

June 14, 2004: Mohamed ElBaradei, Director General of the IAEA, accuses Iran of "less than satisfactory" co-operation during the IAEA investigation of its nuclear program. ElBaradei demands "accelerated and proactive cooperation" from Iran which exceed the terms of Iran's legal obligations.

July 27, 2004: Iran removes seals placed upon uranium centrifuges by the International Atomic Energy Agency and resumes construction of the centrifuges at Natanz.

On June 29, 2004, IAEA Director General Mohammad ElBaradei announced that the Bushehr reactor was "not of international concern" since it was a bilateral Russian-Iranian project intended to produce nuclear energy.

July 31, 2004: Iran states that it has resumed building nuclear centrifuges to enrich uranium, reversing a voluntary October 2003 pledge to Britain, France, and Germany to suspend all uranium enrichment-related activities. The United States contends that the purpose is to produce weapons-grade uranium.

August 10, 2004: Several long-standing charges and questions regarding weapons-grade uranium samples found in Iran are clarified by the IAEA. Some samples match Pakistani and Russian sources which had contaminated imported Iranian equipment from those countries. The sources of the remaining samples remain unaccounted for.

August 24, 2004: Iranian Foreign Minister Kamal Kharrazi declares in Wellington, New Zealand, that Iran will retaliate with force against Israel or any nation that attempts a pre-emptive strike on its nuclear program. Earlier in the week, Israel's Chief of Staff, General Moshe Ya'alon, told an Israeli newspaper that "Iran is striving for nuclear capability and I suggest that in this matter [Israel] not rely on others."

September 6, 2004: The latest IAEA report finds that "unresolved issues surrounding Iran's atomic program are being clarified or resolved outright".

September 18, 2004: The IAEA unanimously adopts a resolution calling on Iran to suspend all activities related to uranium enrichment.

September 21, 2004: Iran announces that it will continue its nuclear program converting 37 tonnes of yellowcake uranium for processing in centrifuges.

October 18, 2004: Iran states that it is willing to negotiate with the U.K., Germany, and France regarding a suspension of its uranium enrichment activities, but that it will never renounce its right to enrich uranium.

October 24, 2004: The European Union makes a proposal to provide civilian nuclear technology to Iran in exchange for Iran terminating its uranium enrichment program permanently. Iran rejects this outright, saying it will not renounce its right to enrichment technologies. A decision to refer the matter from the International Atomic Energy Agency to the United Nations Security Council is expected on November 25, 2004.

November 15, 2004: Talks between Iran and three European Union members, the United Kingdom, France, and Germany, result in a compromise. Iran agrees to temporarily suspend its active uranium enrichment program for the duration of a second round of talks, during which attempts will be made at arriving at a permanent, mutually-beneficial solution.

November 15, 2004: A confidential UN report is leaked. The report states that all nuclear materials within Iran have been accounted for and there is no evidence of any military nuclear program. Nevertheless, it still cannot discount the possibility of such a program because it does not have perfect knowledge.

November 22, 2004: Iran declares that it will voluntarily suspend its uranium enrichment program to enter negotiations with the EU. Iran will review its decision in three months. The EU seeks to have the suspension made permanent and is willing to provide economic and political incentives.

November 24, 2004: Iran seeks to obtain permission from the European Union, in accordance with its recent agreement with the EU, to allow it to continue working with 24 centrifuges for research purposes.

November 28, 2004: Iran withdraws its demand that some of its technology be exempted from a freeze on nuclear enrichment activities.

== 2005 ==
Jan 17, 2005: Iran offers a proposal to the EU. It includes: An Iranian commitment not to pursue weapons of mass destruction; cooperation on combating terrorism, and on regional security, including for Iraq and Afghanistan; and cooperation on strategic trade controls. The proposal was not accepted.

Mar 23, 2005: Iran offers a proposal to the EU including: Iran's adoption of the IAEA Additional Protocol and continuous on-site inspections at key facilities; as well as limiting the expansion of Iran's enrichment program, and a policy declaration of no reprocessing. The proposal was not accepted.

June 2005: U.S. Secretary of State Condoleezza Rice said IAEA head Mohamed ElBaradei should either "toughen his stance on Iran" or fail to be chosen for a third term as the agency's head. Following a one on one meeting between Rice and ElBaradei on June 9, the United States withdrew its opposition and ElBaradei was re-elected to his position on June 13, 2005.

August 5, 2005: The EU-3 submit a proposal to Iran pursuant to the Paris Agreement which requires Iran to permanently cease enrichment. The proposal is rejected by Iran as a violation of the Paris Agreement and Iran's Non-Proliferation Treaty rights.

Between August 8 and August 10, 2005: Iran resumed the conversion of uranium at the Isfahan facility, under IAEA safeguards, but did not engage in enrichment of uranium.

August 9, 2005: The Iranian Head of State, Ayatollah Ali Khamenei, issued a fatwa forbidding the production, stockpiling and use of nuclear weapons. The full text of the fatwa was released in an official statement at the meeting of the International Atomic Energy Agency in Vienna.

August 11, 2005: The 35-member governing board of the IAEA adopted a resolution calling upon Iran to suspend uranium conversion, and instructing ElBaradei to submit a report on Iran's nuclear program by September 3, 2005.

August 15, 2005: Iran's new president, Mahmoud Ahmadinejad, installed his new government. Iranian presidents do not have exclusive control over Iran's nuclear program, which falls mainly under the purview of Iran's Supreme Leader. Ali Larijani replaced Hassan Rowhani as secretary of the Supreme National Security Council, Iran's top policy-making body, with nuclear policy in his purview.

September 15, 2005: Ahmadinejad stated at a United Nations high-level summit that Iran has the right to develop a civil nuclear-power program within the terms of the 1970 treaty on the non-proliferation of nuclear weapons. He offered a compromise solution in which foreign companies would be permitted to invest and participate in Iran's nuclear program, which he said would ensure that it could not be secretly diverted to make nuclear weapons.

September 24, 2005: The IAEA Board of Governors finds that the failures and breaches reported in November 2003 constitute non-compliance with Iran's safeguards agreement.

October 10, 2005: Iranian Oil Ministry Deputy for International Affairs Hadi Nejad-Hosseinian said that Iran could run out of oil reserves in nine decades.

November 5, 2005: The Iranian government approved a plan that allows foreign investors to participate in the work at the Natanz uranium enrichment plant. The cabinet also authorised the AEOI to take necessary measures to attract foreign and domestic investment in the uranium enrichment process.

November 19, 2005: The IAEA released a report saying that Iran blocked nuclear inspectors from the United Nations from conducting a second visit to a site known as Parchin military complex, where Iran was not legally required to allow inspections at all. The first inspections had failed to turn up any evidence of a nuclear program. IAEA Director-General Mohamed ElBaradei said in the report, "Iran's full transparency is indispensable and overdue." Separately, Iran confirmed that it had resumed the conversion of new quantities of uranium pursuant to its rights under the NPT, despite an IAEA resolution to stop such work.

== 2006 ==
January 2006: Iran provides the European negotiating side with a six-point proposal, which includes an offer to again suspend uranium enrichment for a period of two years, pending the outcome of continued negotiations. The offer is dismissed by the Europeans, and not reported in the Western press. This offer of compromise follows several other offers from Iran, all of which were summarily dismissed by the US.

January 31, 2006: The IAEA reports that "Iran has continued to facilitate access under its Safeguards Agreement as requested by the Agency ... including by providing in a timely manner the requisite declarations and access to locations" and lists outstanding issues.

January 2006: The New York Times reporter James Risen published State of War, in which he alleged a CIA operation code-named Operation Merlin backfired and may have helped Iran in its nuclear program, in an attempt to delay it feeding them false information.

February 4, 2006: The IAEA votes 27–3 to report Iran to the United Nations Security Council. After the vote, Iran announced its intention to end voluntary co-operation with the IAEA beyond basic Nuclear Non-Proliferation Treaty requirements, and to resume enrichment of uranium.

March 2006: The U.S. National Security Strategy decried Iran, stating that "Iran has violated its Non-Proliferation Treaty safeguards obligations and refuses to provide objective guarantees that its nuclear program is solely for peaceful purposes." The term "objective guarantees" is understood to mean permanent abandonment of enrichment.

March 15, 2006: President Mahmoud Ahmadinejad reaffirms Iran's commitment to developing a domestic nuclear power industry.

March 27, 2006: In a Foreign Policy article entitled "Fool Me Twice", Joseph Cirincione, director for non-proliferation at the Carnegie Endowment for International Peace, claimed that "some senior officials have already made up their minds: They want to hit Iran." and that there "may be a co-ordinated campaign to prepare for a military strike on Iran." Joseph Cirincione also warns "that a military strike would be disastrous for the United States. It would rally the Iranian public around an otherwise unpopular regime, inflame anti-American anger around the Muslim world, and jeopardise the already fragile U.S. position in Iraq. And it would accelerate, not delay, the Iranian nuclear program. Hard-liners in Tehran would be proven right in their claim that the only thing that can deter the United States is a nuclear bomb. Iranian leaders could respond with a crash nuclear program that could produce a bomb in a few years."

April 11, 2006: Ahmadinejad announced that Iran had enriched uranium to reactor-grade using 164 centrifuges. He said, "I am officially announcing that Iran has joined the group of those countries which have nuclear technology. This is the result of the Iranian nation's resistance. Based on international regulations, we will continue our path until we achieve production of industrial-scale enrichment". He reiterated that the enrichment was performed for purely civil power purposes and not for weapons purposes.

April 28, 2006: The International Atomic Energy Agency hands a report titled Implementation of the NPT Safeguards Agreement in the Islamic Republic of Iran to the UN Security Council. The IAEA says that Iran has stepped up its uranium enrichment programs during the 30-day period covered by the report.

June 1, 2006: The UN Security Council agrees to a set of proposals designed to reach a compromise with Iran.

July 31, 2006:United Nations Security Council Resolution 1696 gave until August 31, 2006 for Iran to suspend all uranium enrichment and related activities or face the prospect of sanctions. The draft passed by a vote of 14-1 (Qatar, which represents Arab states on the council, opposing). The same day, Iran's U.N. Ambassador Javad Zarif qualified the resolution as "arbitrary" and illegal because the NTP protocol explicitly guarantees under international law Iran's right to pursue nuclear activities for peaceful purposes. In response to today's vote at the UN, Iranian President Mahmoud Ahmadinejad said that his country will revise his position vis-à-vis the economic/incentive package offered previously by the G-6 (5 permanent Security council members plus Germany.)

September 16, 2006: (Havana, Cuba) All of the 118 Non-Aligned Movement member countries declare their support for Iran's nuclear program for civilian purposes in their final written statement . That is a clear majority of the 192 countries comprising the entire United Nations.

December 23, 2006: United Nations Security Council Resolution 1737 was unanimously passed by the United Nations Security Council. The resolution, sponsored by France, Germany and the United Kingdom, imposed sanctions against Iran for failing to stop its uranium enrichment program following Security Council Resolution 1696. It banned the supply of nuclear-related technology and materials and froze the assets of key individuals and companies related to the enrichment program. The resolution came after the rejection of UN economic incentives for Iran to halt their nuclear enrichment program. The sanctions will be lifted if Iran suspends the "suspect activities" within 60 days to the satisfaction of the International Atomic Energy Agency.

== 2007 ==
January 15, 2007: Ardeshir Hosseinpour, an Iranian junior scientist involved in The Uranium Conversion Facility at Isfahan, dies, reportedly due to "gassing". Several other scientists may also be killed or injured, and treated in nearby hospitals.

January 21, 2007: The death of Ardeshir Hosseinpour is finally reported by the Al-Quds daily and the Iranian Student's News Agency (in Arabic & Persian).

February 2, 2007: The U.S. private intelligence company Stratfor releases a report saying that Ardeshir Hosseinpour was killed by the Mossad through radioactive poisoning.

February 4, 2007: Reva Bhalla of Stratfor confirms the details of Stratfor's report to The Sunday Times. Despite the previous reports, the "semi-official" Fars News Agency reports that an unnamed informed source in Tehran told them that Ardeshir Hosseinpour was not involved in the nuclear facility at Isfahan, and that he "suffocated by fumes from a faulty gas fire in sleep."

March 6, 2007: Gholam Reza Aghazadeh, the head of AEOI declared that Iran has started construction of a domestically built nuclear power plant with capacity of 360 MW in Darkhovin, in southwestern Iran.

March 24, 2007: United Nations Security Council Resolution 1747 is adopted unanimously by the United Nations Security Council (UNSC). In the UNSC resolution, the Council resolved to tighten the sanctions imposed on Iran in connection with that nation's nuclear program. It also resolved to impose a ban on arms sales and to step up the freeze on assets already in place.

April 9, 2007: President Mahmoud Ahmadinejad announced that Iran could produce nuclear fuel on an industrial scale. Some officials said 3,000 uranium gas enrichment centrifuges were running at the Natanz plant in central Iran.

June 7, 2007: *Head of the International Atomic Energy Agency, Mohammad ElBaradei was quoted by the BBC as warning against the views of "new crazies who say 'let's go and bomb Iran'".

June 30, 2007: U.S. Congressional Representatives Mark S. Kirk and Robert E. Andrews proposed a bill to sanction against any company or individual that provides Iran with refined petroleum products. The plan is to pressure Iran over its nuclear program from December 31, 2007.

December 3, 2007: The U.S. Intelligence Community released a National Intelligence Estimate concluding that Iran "halted its nuclear weapons program" in 2003, but "is keeping open the option to develop nuclear weapons."

December 11, 2007: British spy chiefs have grave doubts that Iran has mothballed its nuclear weapons program, as a U.S. intelligence report claimed last week, and believe the CIA has been hoodwinked by Tehran.

December 16, 2007: Iran's president said on Sunday the publication of a U.S. intelligence report saying Iran had halted a nuclear weapons program in 2003 amounted to a "declaration of surrender" by Washington in its row with Tehran.

== 2008 ==
- March 4, 2008: The UN Security Council adopts Resolution 1803 - the third sanction resolution on Iran with a 14–0 vote (Indonesia abstained). The resolution extends financial sanctions to additional banks, extends travel bans to additional persons and bars exports to Iran of nuclear- and missile-related dual-use items.
- March 24, 2008: The last shipment of fuel and equipment arrives at the Bushehr Nuclear Power Plant.
- May 16, 2008: Iran offers proposed package to the UN, UN Security Council, Group of G+1 and submitted to Russia and China.

== 2009 ==
- February 17: In Paris, International Atomic Energy Agency Director-General Mohamed ElBaradei said that Iran is still not helping United Nations nuclear inspectors find out whether it worked on developing an atom bomb in the past but Tehran has slowed its expansion of a key nuclear facility. "They haven't really been adding centrifuges, which is a good thing," ElBaradei said at a think-tank in Paris, adding: "Our assessment is that it's a political decision."
- June 5: IAEA releases report on Iran's compliance with the NPT. The IAEA claims the following: Access not granted for a recent inspection on May 19; access not granted since August 2008 to heavy water reactor at Arak; and, IAEA not given design information for reactor at Darkhovin. The IAEA further reports that Iran has not implemented the Additional Protocol (a requirement of UN Security Council Resolution 1737) and has not cooperated in providing information which remains unclear or missing.
- June 19: El Baradei stated he had a "gut feeling that Iran definitely would like to have the technology" enabling it to possess nuclear weapons. He told the BBC that Iran wants to "send a message" to its neighbors and the rest of the world: "Don't mess" with Iran and "we can have nuclear weapons if we want to." Asked about voices in Israel who back a military strike against Iran to stop it from getting a nuclear weapon, El Baradei reiterated his opposition, saying "military action" would turn the region "into a ball of fire."
- July 8–10: On the 35th G8 summit, U.S. president Obama said Iran will have to September (at the G20 meeting) to show some improvements on the negotiations about Iran's nuclear program, or else "face consequences". French president Nicolas Sarkozy said G8 are united on the issue with Iran, stating that patience with Iran was running thin: "For the past 6 years we have extended our hand saying stop your nuclear armament program... Do they want discussions or don't they want them? If they don't, there will be sanctions" he told reporters. Sarkozy also stated that Israel attacking Iran, would be an absolute catastrophe. "Israel should know that it is not alone and should follow what is going on calmly," he said, adding that he had not received any assurances that Israel would hold off on any action ahead of the September deadline.
- July 25: Mohammad Ali Jafari, Iran's Revolutionary Guards commander-in-chief, said that if Israel attacked Iran, Iran would strike Israel's nuclear facilities with their missiles: "Our missile capability puts all of the Zionist regime (Israel) within Iran's reach to attack," Jafari said.
- August 7: U.S. Air Force General Charles Wald said that a devastating U.S. military strike against Iran's nuclear and military facilities "is a technically feasible and credible option".

== 2010 ==
- February 9: Iran began producing uranium enriched to 20%, reportedly for the Tehran Research Reactor.
- May 17: Iran, Turkey and Brazil announced a deal on procedures for a nuclear fuel swap aimed at easing concerns over Tehran's nuclear program.
- June 9: The UN Security Council passed Resolution 1929, which increased sanctions against Iran. It made rules about Iran’s nuclear program stricter, banned nuclear-capable missile tests, and stopped the sale of major weapons to Iran.
- June 24: The U.S. Congress passed a new law that increased sanctions on Iran. It targeted companies investing in Iran’s energy industry and companies selling refined oil to Iran. The sanctions were extended until 2016.
- July 26: The EU agreed to impose new sanctions on Iran. The sanctions affected trade, banking, energy, and transportation. They also included travel bans and freezing some Iranian assets.
- August 21: Iran acquired nuclear fuel rods from Russia.
- September 16: A security expert discovers the Stuxnet computer virus. It was designed to attack an Iranian nuclear facility, probably the Natanz nuclear plant.

== 2011 ==
- January 21–22: The P5+1 met with Iran in Istanbul, but they did not reach an agreement. Iran wanted the P5+1 to recognize its right to enrich uranium and remove the sanctions. The P5+1 rejected these conditions.
- February 16: U.S. intelligence officials told a Senate committee that Iran had not yet decided to build nuclear weapons, but it was developing the capabilities needed to keep that option open.
- May 8: Iran’s Bushehr nuclear power plant begins operating. Two days later, it successfully achieves a stable nuclear chain reaction, according to Atomstroyexport, the Russian state-owned company responsible for building and operating the plant.
- May 10, 2011: Iran's Bushehr Nuclear Power Plant began operating at a low level.
- June 8: Iran announces plans to triple its production of uranium enriched to 20 percent by using more advanced centrifuges. Iran also says it will move this production to the Fordow enrichment facility near Qom, which was still under construction at the time.
- July 12: Russian Foreign Minister Sergey Lavrov presents a proposal for Iran to increase cooperation with the IAEA and take confidence-building steps in exchange for a gradual reduction of sanctions.
- October 21: EU foreign policy chief Catherine Ashton sent a letter to Iran’s nuclear negotiator, Saeed Jalili, urging “meaningful discussions” on specific confidence-building measures to address international concerns about Iran’s nuclear program.
- November 8: IAEA released a safeguards report that included detailed account of "possible military dimensions" to Iran's nuclear program. The Agency expressed serious concerns regarding Iran's "activities relevant to the development of a nuclear explosive device." According to information from the report, Parchin military complex has been used for testing high explosives that could be used in nuclear weapons. Yukiya Amano, Director General of the IAEA, also stated in his report that the Agency cannot "conclude that all nuclear material in Iran is in peaceful activities," since "Iran is not providing the necessary cooperation."
- December 31: As part of the Fiscal Year 2012 National Defense Authorization Act, Congress passed legislation allowing the United States to impose sanctions on foreign banks that continued to process transactions involving Iran’s Central Bank.

== 2012 ==
- January 2012: Iran announced it had begun uranium enrichment at the Fordow facility near Qom. The IAEA confirmed Iran started the production of uranium enriched to 20%.
- January 29–31, 2012: After exchanging letters with Iran, the IAEA agreed to send a team to Tehran to discuss its investigation into the possible military aspects of Iran’s nuclear program, as described in the Agency’s November 2011 report.
- February 15, 2012: Jalili responds to Ashton’s October 21 letter as Iran announces new nuclear achievements, including the production of a fuel plate for the Tehran Research Reactor (TRR).
- April 14, 2012: Iran and the P5+1 hold positive talks in Istanbul. Both sides agree to continue negotiations step by step, with each side taking actions in return for the other.
- May 23-24, 2012: Iran and the P5+1 meet in Baghdad (in Iraq) for a second set of talks.
- June 18–19, 2012: Iran and the P5+1 continue talks in Moscow. Both sides discuss their proposals. Catherine Ashton and Saeed Jalili say they will decide whether to continue high-level political talks after a technical meeting in July.
- July 1: The European Union decided to ban all member states from importing Iranian oil starting July 1, 2012. The decision also prohibited EU countries from providing the insurance and protection services needed for tankers transporting Iranian oil.
- July 3, 2012: Experts from the six parties meet in Istanbul to discuss the technical details of both the P5+1 proposal and Iran’s proposal.
- July 24, 2012: Schmid and Bagheri meet in Istanbul to discuss the results of the experts’ meeting. They agree that Ashton and Jalili will discuss the next steps in the negotiations.
- August 30, 2012: The IAEA reports that Iran has installed more centrifuges at the Fordow nuclear facility and continues to produce 20% enriched uranium beyond what it needs for the Tehran Research Reactor.
- September 2012: Ashton and Jalili meet in Istanbul to review the areas of agreement reached during the experts’ talks in early July. The meeting is not an official negotiation.
- September 27, 2012: Israeli Prime Minister Benjamin Netanyahu tells the UN General Assembly that Israel may attack Iran if it collects enough uranium enriched to 20 percent. He sets the limit at about 250 kilograms, which could be further enriched to make enough material for one nuclear bomb.
- November 16, 2012: The IAEA reports that Iran has installed all 2,800 centrifuges planned for the Fordow facility, although the number actually enriching uranium has not changed. The number of centrifuges producing 20% enriched uranium also remains the same. The report adds that Iran installed more centrifuges at Natanz and continued producing 20% enriched uranium.

== 2013 ==
- February 26, 2013: Iran and the P5+1 resume negotiations in Almaty, Kazakhstan over Iran's nuclear program. The P5+1 offers Iran an updated proposal based largely on the 2012 package.
- March 2013: The United States began a series of secret negotiations with Iranian officials in Oman. The negotiations were kept hidden from other P5+1 partners. The White House asked journalists not to report on the talks.
- April 5–6, 2013: Iran and the P5+1 meet for a second round of talks in Almaty. The meetings end without an agreement, and both sides remain far apart. No further talks are scheduled.
- In Vienna, Iran's new IAEA representative, Reza Najafi, meets with IAEA deputy director Herman Nackaerts to restart talks about concerns that Iran's nuclear program may have military purposes. Both sides describe the meeting as positive and agree to meet again on October 28.
- Wendy Sherman, the U.S. Undersecretary of State for Political Affairs, says that Iran was more open and honest during the talks than it had been in the previous two years of negotiations. Both sides agree to meet again in Geneva on November 7–8, with a meeting of experts scheduled for October 30–31.
- August 3, 2013: Hassan Rouhani was inaugurated as the president of Iran.
- October 15–16, 2013: Iran and the P5+1 meet in Geneva to restart talks about Iran's nuclear program. After the meetings, both sides describe the talks as productive and focused on future progress. Iran presents a new proposal, which the P5+1 considers an important contribution. The proposal reportedly includes a plan for a final agreement and temporary steps to build trust over the next 3–6 months. However, no details are released because both sides agree to keep the negotiations secret.
- October 28–29, 2013: Iran and the IAEA meet to continue discussions about investigations into Iran's past nuclear activities that may have had military purposes. Iran presents a new proposal with practical steps to improve cooperation and help resolve the remaining issues. Both sides agree to meet again in Tehran on November 11.
- November 7–10, 2013: Iran and the P5+1 meet in Geneva to continue negotiations over Iran's nuclear program. On November 8, U.S. Secretary of State John Kerry and other foreign ministers join the talks because an agreement seems close. However, the sides fail to reach an initial agreement and decide to continue negotiations on November 20 in Geneva.
- November 11, 2013: Iran and the IAEA signed a Joint Statement on a Framework for Cooperation committing both parties to cooperate and resolve all present and past issues. As a first step, the Framework identified six practical measures to be completed within three months.
- Secretary Kerry says at a November 10 press conference that the sides reduced their disagreements and made important progress toward reaching an agreement.
- November 20–24, 2013: Iran and the P5+1 meet again in Geneva to continue nuclear negotiations. On November 23, the P5+1 foreign ministers join the talks. Early on November 24, Iran's Foreign Minister and P5+1 representative Catherine Ashton sign an agreement called the Joint Plan of Action. It sets out steps both sides must take during an initial six-month period and provides a framework for negotiating a final, comprehensive agreement.
- November 24, 2013: Iran and the P5+1 reached an interim agreement (Joint Plan of Action).
- December 8, 2013: As part of the Framework for Cooperation Agreement, the IAEA visits Iran’s Arak Heavy Water Production Plant.
- December 9–12, 2013: Iran and the P5+1 meet in Geneva for technical talks on how to implement the November 24 Joint Plan of Action.
- December 11, 2013: Iran and the IAEA meet in Vienna to review progress on the six steps Iran agreed to take under the Framework for Cooperation Agreement. They also discuss further actions Iran should take. They initially plan to meet again on January 21, but the meeting is later postponed to February 8 at Iran’s request.
- December 30–31, 2013: Iran and the P5+1 continue technical talks in Geneva on implementing the Joint Plan of Action.

== 2014 ==
- January 9–10, 2014: Iran and the P5+1 hold their third meeting in Geneva to discuss implementing the agreement. They reach an understanding and return to their respective countries to seek approval.
- January 12, 2014: Iran and the P5+1 announce that they will begin implementing the Joint Plan of Action on January 20.
- January 20, 2014: Implementation of the Joint Plan of Action begins. The IAEA reports that Iran is following the agreement. Iran has stopped enriching uranium to 20%, started reducing half of its 20%-enriched uranium stockpile to 3.5%, and halted work on the Arak Heavy Water Reactor. The IAEA also begins carrying out more frequent and detailed inspections of Iran's nuclear facilities.
- February 9, 2014: Iran and the IAEA meet to discuss further steps under their November 11 agreement to address concerns about Iran’s nuclear program. They agree on additional actions, including investigating Iran’s past work on exploding bridgewire detonators, which were linked to possible military uses of its nuclear program.
- February 17–20, 2014: Iran and the P5+1 start talks in Vienna in order to reach a final deal. They agree on how the talks will proceed.
- March 17-20, 2014: The P5+1 and Islamic Republic of Iran meet in Vienna to continue negotiations.
- April 7-9, 2014: Another round of talks between Islamic Republic of Iran and the P5+1 take place in Vienna.
- May 13-16, 2014: The P5+1 and Islamic Republic of Iran begin drafting the comprehensive agreement.
- May 21, 2014: Iran and the IAEA agree on five new steps for Iran to complete by August 25. Two involve providing information about possible military-related nuclear activities.
- July 20, 2014: Initial deadline for reaching a comprehensive agreement between the P5+1 and Iran. The deadline was extended to November 24, 2014.
- August 25, 2014: Iran had implemented three of the five specific steps agreed with the IAEA in May 2014 but failed to meet the deadline of 25 August on the other steps.

== 2015 ==
- January 15-18, 2015: The P5+1 and Islamic Republic of Iran meet in Geneva to continue negotiations.
- July 14, 2015: The P5+1 and Iran reached agreement on the Joint Comprehensive Plan of Action (JCPOA), which lifted Sanctions on Iran in exchange for limits on Iran's nuclear program and expanded IAEA verification.
- July 20, 2015: The JCPOA was codified in United Nations Security Council Resolution 2231.

== 2018 ==
- April 30, 2018: Israeli Prime Minister Benjamin Netanyahu gave a speech on where he spoke of "new and conclusive proof of the secret nuclear weapons program that Iran has been hiding for years from the international community in its secret atomic archive."
- May 8, 2018: U.S. President Donald Trump announced United States withdrawal from the Joint Comprehensive Plan of Action.

== 2021 ==
- Iran's parliament passed a law mandating the enrichment of uranium to 20% ^{235}U, exceeding the limits in the JCPOA and over the objections of the Iranian president.

== 2024 ==
- Iran was warned by the IAEA about lack of transparency in their nuclear activities.

== 2025 ==
- June 12: The IAEA Board of Governors found Iran non-compliant with its safeguards obligations for the first time in 20 years. The IAEA stated that Iran’s repeated failure to fully address questions about undeclared nuclear material and activities amounts to non-compliance. It also raised concerns over Iran’s stockpile of highly enriched uranium, which could be used to make nine nuclear weapons. Iran dismissed the resolution as politically motivated, and declared plans to build a new enrichment site and install advanced centrifuges. Using Iranian data available up to 12 June, most of which the IAEA had independently checked, the agency estimated that Iran held 9,874.9 kg of enriched uranium, including 184.1 kg enriched to 20% and 440.9 kg enriched to 60%.
- June 13: Israel began launching large-scale attacks against targets in several areas in Iran. Israel's codename for the attack was Operation Rising Lion. The attacks, conducted by the Israel Defense Forces and Mossad, occurred at nuclear sites, military sites, and officials' residential buildings. Blasts were reported in Natanz, in Iran's Isfahan province, where one of the country's most critical nuclear facilities is located. Nuclear sites at Khondab and Khorramabad were also targeted.
- June 21: the US bombed the Fordow Uranium Enrichment Plant, the Natanz Nuclear Facility, and the Isfahan nuclear technology center. In an address from the White House, Trump claimed "Iran’s key nuclear enrichment facilities have been completely and totally obliterated," though later reporting said only one site (Fordow) was "mostly destroyed."
- July 2: Iran suspended co-operation with the United Nations' International Atomic Energy Agency. The last IAEA inspectors left Iran by July 4.
- August 28: E3 members initiated the snapback mechanism for sanctions against Iran. The mechanism gave a 30-day deadline for further diplomatic efforts before the Security Council sanctions went into effect, however Iran was unable to prevent the sanctions from being implemented before the end of the deadline.
- September 28: U.N. Security Council sanctions against Iran and Iran’s nuclear program resume, 10 years after the JCPOA was created.
- November 16: Mohammad Eslami, the head of the Atomic Energy Organization of Iran, stated that the first site targeted by Israel during its attacks was the fuel production facility for the Tehran Research Reactor—a reactor used to produce radioactive medicines. He claimed that information regarding this facility had been shared with the International Atomic Energy Agency (IAEA), and that the facility had been equipped with the Agency's assistance.

== 2026 ==
- February 28: United States and Israel started a war with surprise airstrikes on sites and cities across Iran, assassinating Supreme Leader Ali Khamenei and several other Iranian officials and inflicting thousands of civilian casualties.
- September 1: The IAEA said it could no longer verify Iran’s enriched uranium stockpile or determine whether enrichment had ceased because inspectors had been denied access to the country’s main enrichment facilities since June 2025.

== See also ==
- 13 steps, Article 6 of the NPT (disarmament pledge)
- 2025–2026 Iran–United States negotiations
- Comprehensive Test Ban Treaty
- Global Nuclear Energy Partnership
- Iran-Russia relations
- Iran–United States relations
- Israel and the nuclear program of Iran
- Military of Iran
- Supreme Nuclear Committee of Iran
