= United Nations Security Council Resolution 1984 =

UN Security Council Resolution 1984
- Logo of the Atomic Energy Organisation of Iran
- Date: 9 June 2011
- Meeting no.: 6,552
- Code: S/RES/1984 (Document)
- Subject: Non-proliferation; Iran
- Voting summary: 14 voted for; None voted against; 1 abstained
- Result: Adopted

Security Council composition
- Permanent members: China; France; Russia; United Kingdom; United States
- Non-permanent members: Bosnia–Herzegovina; Brazil; Colombia; Germany; Gabon; India; Lebanon; Nigeria; Portugal; South Africa

United Nations Security Council Resolution 1984, adopted on June 9, 2011, after recalling resolutions 1696 (2006), 1737 (2006), 1747 (2007), 1803 (2008), 1835 (2008), 1887 (2009) and 1929 (2010) concerning Iran and non-proliferation, the Council extended the mandate of an expert panel monitoring sanctions against the country over its nuclear program for a period of one year.

The resolution, proposed by France, Germany, the United Kingdom and United States, was adopted by a vote of 14 in favour, none against and one abstention from Lebanon.

== Resolution ==
=== Observations ===
In the preamble of Resolution 1984, the Security Council noted the importance of credible and objective assessments, analysis and recommendations in the reports of the expert panel. It determined that the proliferation of weapons of mass destruction constituted a threat to international peace and security.

=== Acts ===
Acting under Article 41 of Chapter VII of the United Nations Charter, Council members extended the mandate of the expert panel monitoring the Iranian sanctions until June 9, 2012. The panel was required to report to the Council by December 9, 2011 and again at the end of its mandate.

All states, organisations and United Nations bodies were urged to co-operate with the Committee established in Resolution 1737 and the expert panel.

== See also ==
- Iran and weapons of mass destruction
- List of United Nations Security Council Resolutions 1901 to 2000 (2009 – 2011)
- Nuclear facilities in Iran
- Nuclear program of Iran
- Sanctions against Iran
