= P5+1 =

Group of countries that engaged with Iran over its nuclear program

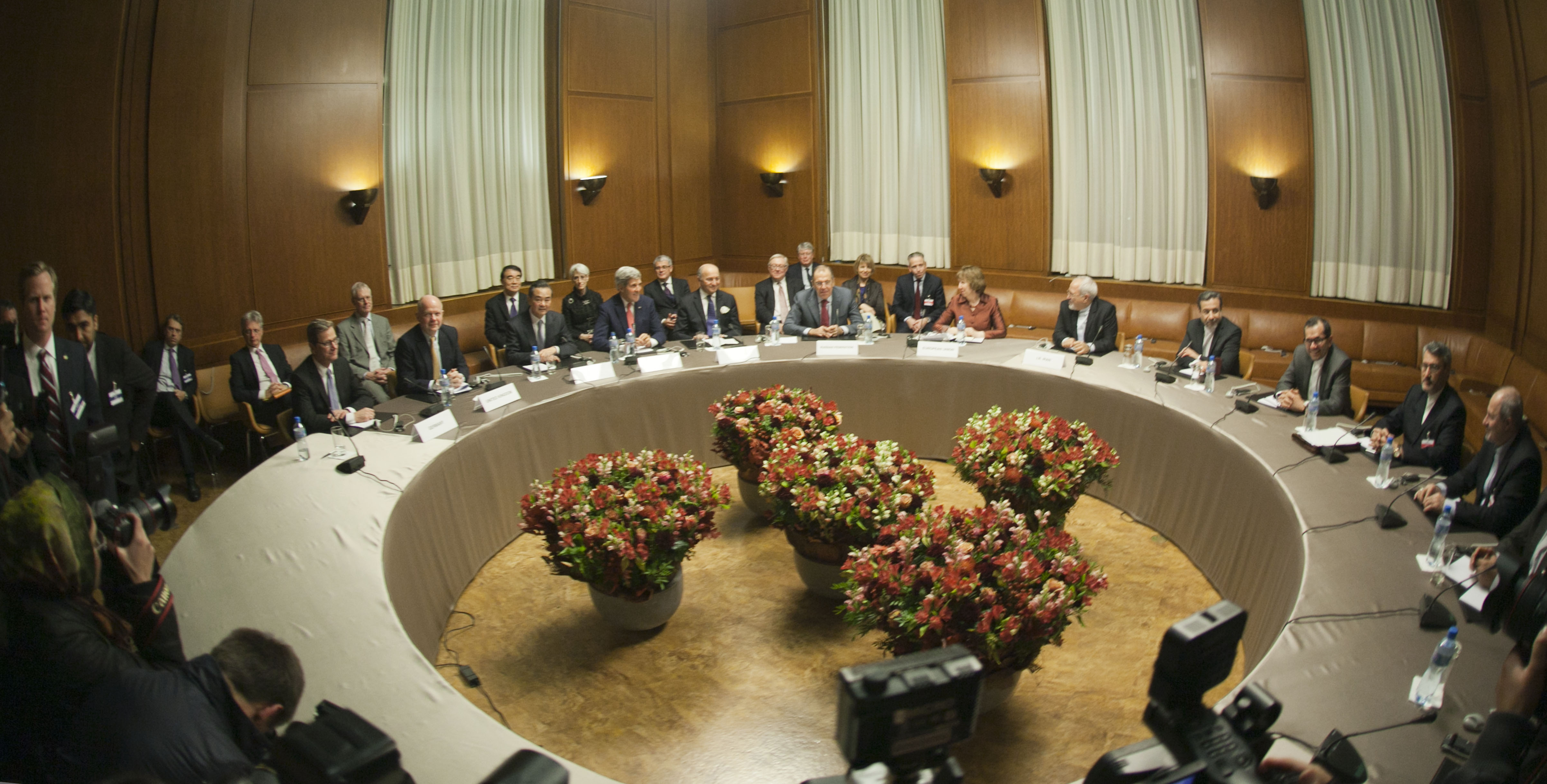
The foreign ministers of the P5+1 nations, the High Representative of the European Union for Foreign Affairs, and the Iranian foreign minister in November 2013, when the Joint Plan of Action, an interim agreement on the Iranian nuclear program, was adopted in Geneva

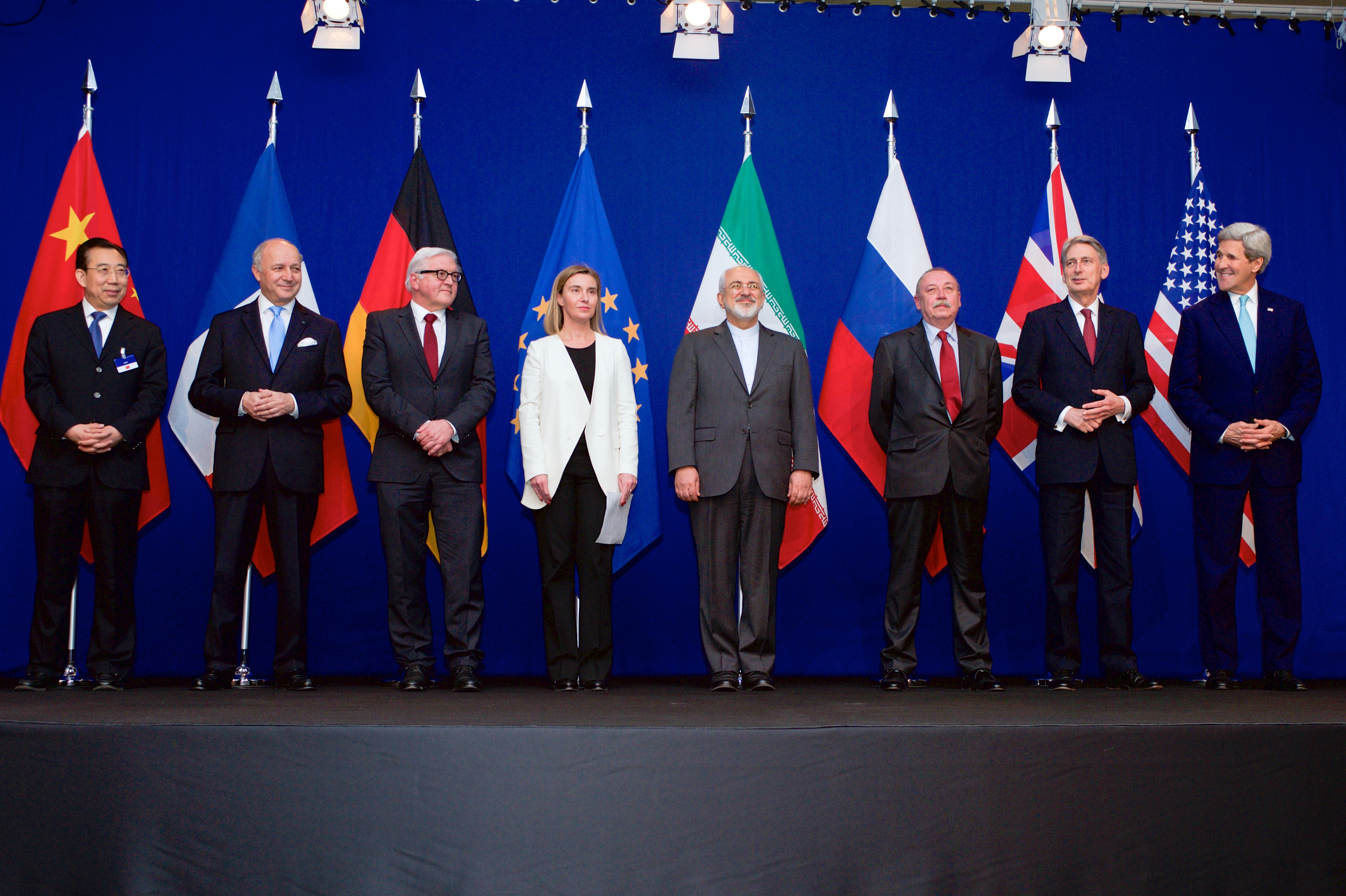
The representatives from the P5+1 countries and the European Union and Iran announcing the nuclear agreement framework in Lausanne on 2 April 2015. The framework became the basis for the Joint Comprehensive Plan of Action (JCPOA), which was agreed on 15 July 2015, from left to right: Chinese ambassador to the United Nations Wu Hailong, French foreign minister Laurent Fabius, German foreign minister Frank-Walter Steinmeier, EU High Representative of the European Union for Foreign Affairs Federica Mogherini, Iranian foreign minister Mohammad Javad Zarif, Russian deputy political director Alexey Karpov, British foreign secretary Philip Hammond and US secretary of state John Kerry; Lausanne, Switzerland on 2 April 2015

The P5+1 refers to the UN Security Council's five permanent members (the P5); namely China, France, Russia, the United Kingdom, and the United States; plus Germany. The P5+1 is often referred to as the E3+3 by European countries. It is a group of six world powers which, in 2006, joined in diplomatic efforts with Iran with regard to its nuclear program.

== History ==
In June 2006, China, Russia, and the United States joined the three EU-3 countries, which had been negotiating with Iran since 2003, to offer another proposal for comprehensive negotiations with Iran.

Up to then, the UN Security Council has adopted six resolutions in response to the Iranian nuclear program. The first resolution, #1696, was adopted in July 2006 and demands that Iran halt its uranium enrichment-related and reprocessing activities.

The next three years saw the adoption of three more resolutions, #1737 in December 2006, #1747 in March 2007, and #1803 in March 2008, which have imposed gradual sanctions on Iranian individuals and entities believed to be involved in Iran's nuclear and missile programs.

UN Security Council Resolution #1835, adopted in September 2008, restated the Security Council's demands made in resolution #1696 of 2006, but without imposing additional sanctions.

The last Security Council resolution, #1929, adopted in June 2010, saw the expansion of more sanctions on Iran for its lack of cooperation and its continued uranium enrichment-related and reprocessing activities

== 2013 interim agreement ==
A round of the talks between Iran and the P5+1, chaired by EU High Representative Catherine Ashton, was held in the Kazakh city of Almaty on 26–27 February 2013. The two sides agreed to meet again in the city on 5–6 April to continue the talks after holding expert-level talks in the Turkish city of Istanbul on 17–18 March 2013.

In a further meeting of the P5+1 in Geneva on 16 October 2013, Iran stated that it may allow unannounced visits to its nuclear sites as a "last step" in a proposal to resolve differences with the West. Lowering uranium enrichment levels could also be part of a final deal, according to an Iranian official.

On 24 November 2013, an interim agreement was reached between the E3/EU+3 (P5+1 countries and the EU) and Iran in Geneva, Switzerland. It is expected to lead to a six-month freeze and partial rollback of portions of Iran's nuclear program in exchange for decreased economic sanctions on Iran, as the countries work towards a long-term agreement. It represents the first formal agreement between the United States and Iran in 34 years.

== 2014 negotiations on a comprehensive agreement ==
The U.S. Under Secretary of State for Political Affairs and the lead negotiator with Iran, Wendy Sherman, told a Senate hearing that Iran's ballistic missile program would be addressed as part of a comprehensive nuclear deal. On 10 February 2014, Iran's defense minister said they successfully test-fired two new domestically made missiles. The next day, Iran laid out "red lines" related to its ballistic missile program, atomic sites and uranium enrichment ahead of talks of the next step in nuclear talks, which resumed in Vienna on 18 February. Deputy Foreign Minister Abbas Araqchi, also a senior Iranian nuclear negotiator, said "defense-related issues are a red line for Iran" and that Tehran "will not allow such issues to be discussed in future talks."

Senior officials of the P5+1 and Iran met on 18–20 February 2014 in Vienna and agreed on a framework for future negotiations. The P5+1 and Iran planned to have monthly meetings to try to forge a final, comprehensive deal.

Former Israeli UN Ambassador Dore Gold claimed that the comprehensive agreement being negotiated between Iran and the P5+1 focused on increased transparency instead of a reduction in nuclear capability. Former U.S. State Department official and advisor on Iran's nuclear program Robert Einhorn said such an agreement would need to both increase transparency and lengthen Iran's timeline for nuclear breakout capability.

== 2015 negotiations on last solutions and final agreement ==
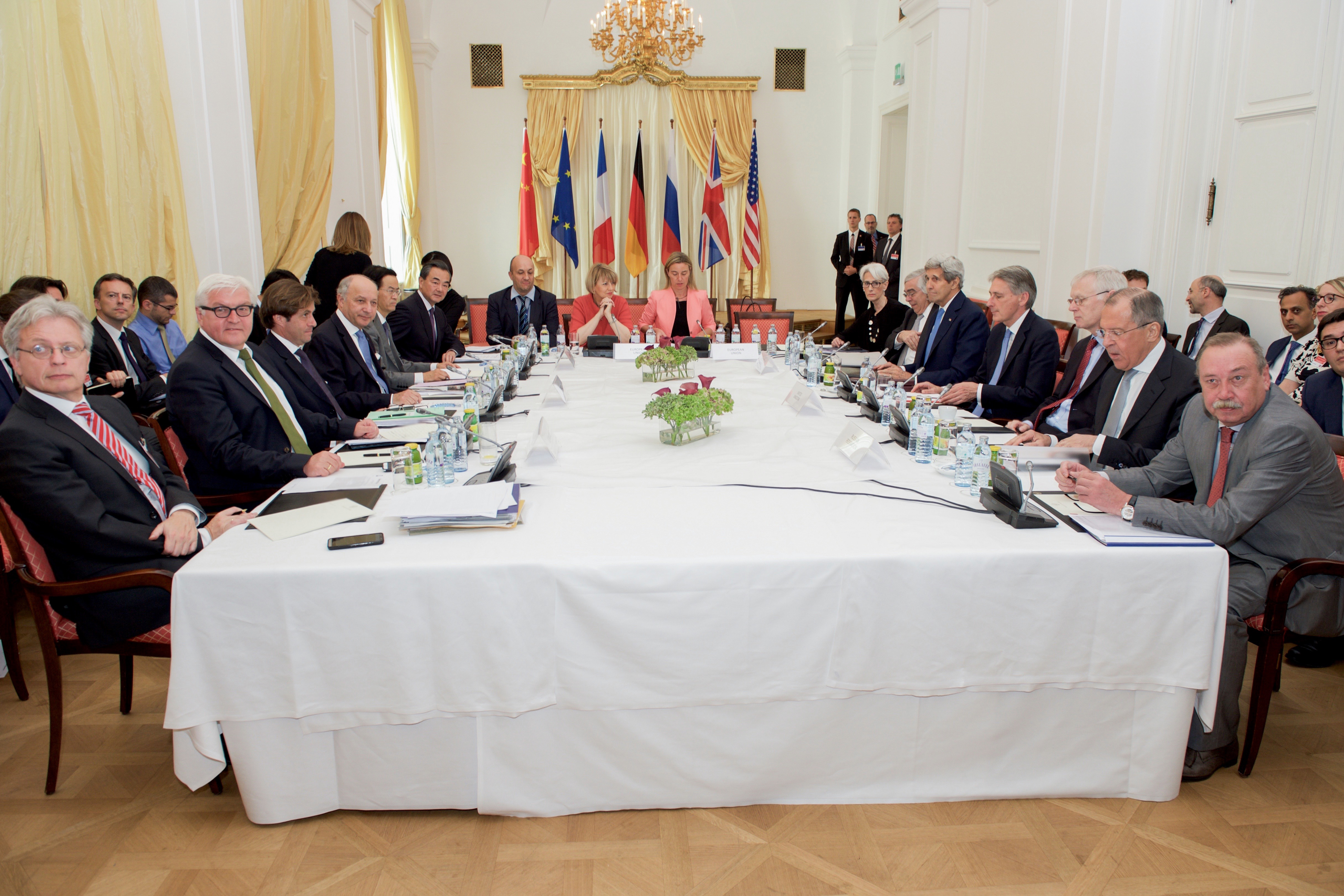
Last meetings before nuclear agreement

== See also ==
- Iran and weapons of mass destruction
- List of Middle East peace proposals
- Iran–United States relations
- Iran–European Union relations
- Germany–Iran relations
- Iran–France relations
- Iran–United Kingdom relations
- Iran–Russia relations
- Iran–China relations
- Iran nuclear deal
- Six-party talks
