= United Nations Security Council resolutions concerning the nuclear program of Iran =

Seven resolutions have been approved by the United Nations Security Council (UNSC) relating to the nuclear program of Iran, although the only one currently in force is Resolution 2231, passed on 20 July 2015 endorsing the Joint Comprehensive Plan of Action on the Iranian nuclear program. It sets out an inspection process and schedule while also preparing for the removal of United Nations arms sanctions against Iran. In August 2020, the U.S. released a proposal to extend the UN arms embargo on Iran in the UN.

== All UN arms resolution on Iran ==
These are the security council resolutions concerning the United Nations' arms embargoes on Iran:

=== Resolution 1737 ===
On 23 December 2006, the UN adopted Resolution 1737 on Iran. The United Nations Security Council (UNSC) called on Iran to suspend all uranium-enrichment activities, including research and extension. This resolution aimed to prevent the transfer, importation, and export of sensitive nuclear material and equipment by Iran and vice versa. The resolution called on other countries to block all assets of the institutions and persons described in the resolution's annex.

=== Resolution 1747 ===
On 24 March 2007, the UN adopted Resolution 1747 on Iran. In addition to the terms described in Resolution 1737, Iran was banned from transferring, importing, and exporting any arms and Conventional Arms (UNROCA) by its nationals, and using its flag vessels or aircraft. Travel and asset restrictions were placed on individuals connected to Iran's nuclear program.

=== Resolution 1803 ===
On 3 March 2008, the UN adopted Resolution 1803 on Iran. This resolution reinforced the requirements set out in the previous resolutions. It also added restrictions on Iran's banks' transactions and required all countries to inspect cargo entering or transiting from or to Iran within their territory if there were "reasonable grounds to believe the cargo" included prohibited items.

=== Resolution 1929 ===
On 9 June 2010, the UN adopted Resolution 1929 on Iran. It stressed previous resolutions and strengthened the restrictions on Iran's banks' transactions. It also increased the number of Iranian individuals and companies listed on a travel ban and froze their assets. Iran was prevented from transferring, importing, and exporting missiles or missile systems, such as ballistic missiles, and heavy weapons such as battle tanks, combat aircraft, and warships.

=== Resolution 2231 ===
On 20 July 2015, the UN adopted Resolution 2231 on Iran. It endorsed the agreement of the Joint Comprehensive Plan of Action (JCPOA). In the resolution, Iran was banned from transferring, importing, and exporting arms, sensitive nuclear material and equipment, and missiles or missile systems for the duration specified. According to the resolution, when the International Atomic Energy Agency (IAEA) has confirmed that Iran has taken the actions specified, 10 years after the JCPOA Adoption Day, all the previous arms resolutions on Iran will be terminated. On 8 May 2018, the United States left the JCPOA, also known as the "Iran nuclear deal" or the "Iran deal".

== U.S. proposal to extend arms embargo on Iran ==
On 18 October 2020, according to Resolution 2231, all previous arms resolutions on Iran and a travel ban on Quds Force commander Qasem Soleimani ended. In June 2020, the U.S. released an original draft proposal to extend the UN arms embargo on Iran in the UN. The foreign ministers of Russia and China criticized this proposal in letters sent to UN Secretary-General Antonio Guterres and the Security Council. They announced they would veto any resolution if it got nine votes in favor from the 15-member council. Some diplomats claimed the proposal sought to extend the arms embargo, which had been rejected.

In August 2020, the U.S. released an amended draft that replaced the original. The new draft said the embargo, "shall continue to apply until the Security Council decides otherwise" and would expire on 18 October 2020. The U.S. blamed Iran for attacks on Saudi Arabian oil facilities and an Iraqi military base in Kirkuk and the U.S. embassy in Baghdad. The original draft included anti-Iran rhetoric that the U.S. removed from the amended draft.

=== Result ===
On 13 August 2020, this resolution was rejected by 11 abstentions (Britain, France, and Germany), two votes against (China and Russia), and two votes in favor (United States and the Dominican Republic).

=== Reactions ===
United States Before the vote, the U.S. threatened to use "snapback" (sanctions) against Iran if the Security Council defeated the arms embargo resolution.

After the Security Council vote, the U.S. secretary of state, Mike Pompeo, said: "The Security Council's failure to act decisively in defense of international peace and security is inexcusable." He denounced the decision, and called the Iranian regime terrorist. He stated Iran threatens Europe, the Middle East, and beyond, and said the U.S. cannot abide Iran as "the world's biggest leading state sponsor of terrorism, to buy and sell conventional weapons without specific UN restrictions in place".

Kelly Craft, the U.S. ambassador to the United Nations, said that according to the 2231 resolution, the U.S. has a right to use the snapback and return all previous resolutions of the Security Council on Iran. Snapback is a mechanism of JCPOA that lets any of the parties to an accord return all UN resolutions on Iran if Iran violates the accord. She said other members of the Security Council support terrorists.

Israel

Israeli Foreign Minister Gabi Ashkenazi said Iran is a sponsor of terrorism and that the rejection of the U.S. resolution on Iran will lead to further Middle East instability.

China

The Chinese ambassador to the UN, Zhang Jun, said this "once again shows that unilateralism receives no support and bullying will fail". Before, China said the U.S. could not use snapback on Iran because it had unilaterally left the JCPOA.

United Kingdom

America's European allies expressed concern that Iran had free access to dangerous weapons. They explained that the American proposal to extend the embargo indefinitely would never have been accepted because of Russia and China's veto.

Russia

Russia's ambassador to the UN, Mikhail Ulyanov, said "the resolution can be counterproductive" and asked Iran and IAEA to solve the problem. He said on Twitter that the U.S. use of a snapback mechanism will hurt the UNSC. He said the validity of the UN sanctions was called into question by this, and the use of snapback by the U.S. was illegal because they had left the JCPOA unilaterally.

Russian president Vladimir Putin said Iran fully agreed to the JCPOA and offered to hold an online summit with the United States, Britain, France, China, Germany, and Iran to avoid "confrontation and escalation" at the UN.

Iran

Iranian president Hassan Rouhani called the rejection of the U.S. resolution on Iran by the Security Council a humiliating defeat of the U.S. Iranian foreign minister Mohammad Javad Zarif tweeted, "The lawless bullying of Pompeo leaves the United States in isolation again. It's time for Donald Trump to stop listening to rogue novices."

== U.S. actions after rejecting the resolution ==
=== The complaint and the suggestion to trigger the "snapback" against Iran to the UN ===
On 20 August 2020, the U.S. formally demanded the UN institute "snapback" against Iran. According to the JCPOA, each "participant state" can claim an example of "significant non-performance" by Iran. 30 days after a complaint, if no council member offers a draft resolution to extend sanctions relief on Iran within 10 days of a complaint, the secretary-general of the United Nations should do this within the remaining 20 days, and the U.S. can veto all draft resolutions. Otherwise, all sanctions would automatically "snap back". However, on 8 May 2018, the United States withdrew from JCPOA.

=== Result ===
13 countries on the 15 members U.N. declared their opposition to the U.S. suggestion.

=== Reactions ===
United States

John Bolton, the national security advisor to President Donald Trump at the time the U.S. left the JCPOA, wrote an article in The Wall Street Journal called, "Iran Snapback Isn't Worth the Risk It". He also said that the snapback validates the JCPOA, which the U.S. had already left. On the other hand, he believed it would weaken the Security Council veto, which serves U.S. interests at the U.N.

Pompeo said: "No country but the United States has had the courage and conviction to put forward a resolution" and filed a complaint of “significant non-performance” by Iran with the Security Council. He has called European allies supporters of the ayatollahs.

Kelly Craft accused the Security Council and its members of having "lost their way" and standing by the terrorists.

Russia

Vasily Nebenzya, Russia's U.N. ambassador, stated that the snapback by the U.S. was "nonexistent". He claimed the U.S. wanted to make Iran the "scapegoat for an uncontrollable escalation in the Middle East" and said the U.S. was, "putting its knee to the neck of the Iranian people". Russia suggested a security council meeting on Iran, which was rejected by the United States.

European Union

Josep Borrell, a spokesperson for the EU foreign policy chief, claimed the U.S. is not part of JCPOA because it unilaterally withdrew on 8 May 2018 and did not participate in JCPOA programs.

=== Announcement of Snapback Mechanism activation by the United States ===
On 19 September 2020, the United States reimposed all UN sanctions against Iran. On Saturday, Pompeo claimed that all UN sanctions against Iran which were suspended within United Nations Security Council Resolution 2231 were reimposed 31 days following a suggestion to the UN by the U.S. on 20 August 2020.

=== Result ===
António Guterres, the UN secretary-general, stated he could not act on the U.S. statement because there was legal uncertainty.

Iran

Hassan Rouhani claimed U.S. efforts had "reached its definitive point of failure". Majid Takht-Ravanchi said the claim was "null and void."

European Union

European leaders warned that to inflict U.S. sanctions on countries not complying with the reimposed UN ones was legally invalid.

On 20 September 2020, Britain, France, and Germany claimed that all UN sanctions relief on Iran would be terminated. "We have worked tirelessly to preserve the nuclear agreement and remain committed to doing so."

United States

The U.S. tried to impose sanctions on any countries that contravened the UN arms embargo on Iran. The U.S. stated it was still a participant in the agreement from which it withdrew in 2018, but only so that it could activate the "snapback".

== See also ==
- Sanctions against Iran
- United Nations Security Council resolution
