= War of the cities =

Series of air raids, missile attacks and artillery shellings in the Iran–Iraq War

- Part of the Iran–Iraq War
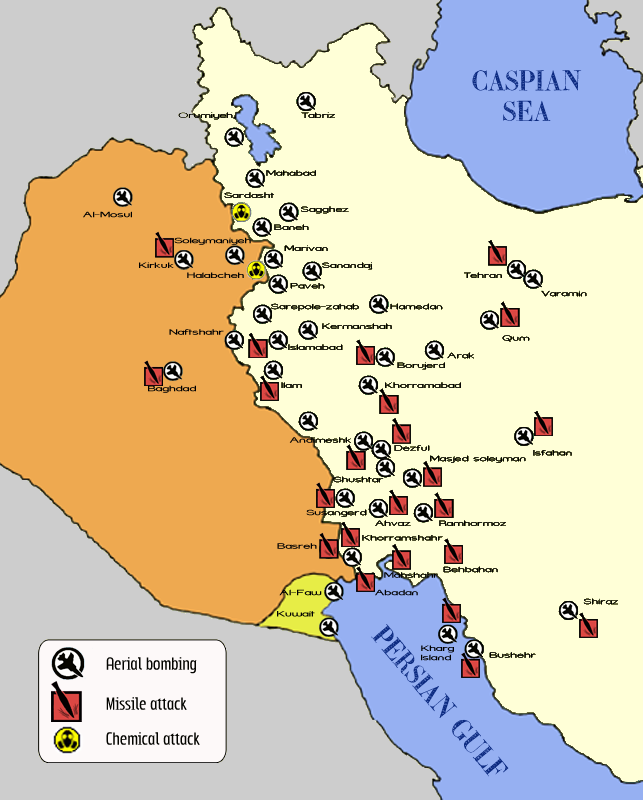
- A map indicating the attacks on civilian areas of Iran, Iraq, and Kuwait targeted during the War of the cities
Date
Location
- February 7 to 22, 1984
- March 22 to April 8, 1985
- January 17 to 25, 1987
- February to April 1987
- January to February 1988
Iran, Iraq, Kuwait

Belligerents
Iraqi Air Force	Iranian Air Force

Commanders and leaders
Saddam Hussein	Ruhollah Khomeini

Casualties and losses
unknown	2,312–4,000 civilians killed 11,625–22,000 civilians wounded

The war of the cities was a mid-1980s series of air raids, missile attacks and artillery shellings on major cities and urban areas initiated by Saddam Hussein's Iraqi Air Force, with the aim of disrupting the morale of Iran during the Iran–Iraq War. The first phase of air strikes were undertaken by the Iraqi Air Force, which normally was followed by retaliation by the Iranian Armed Forces.

Iraq attacked major cities in the western half of Iran, including Tehran, Tabriz, Isfahan and Shiraz, in addition to attacks to Iranian towns and cities close to the front. Iran's retaliations targeted mostly Baghdad, Kirkuk and Basra.

== Raids ==
While Iraq had launched numerous attacks with aircraft and missiles against border cities from the beginning of the war and sporadic raids on Iran's main cities, this was the first systematic strategic bombing that Iraq carried out during the war. This became known as the "war of the cities".

In late 1981, in the context of the Iranian ground counter-offensives, the USSR lifted their arms embargo and massively rearmed Iraq, including with 40 MiG-25s, which enabled the Iraqi air force to challenge Iran's F-14s in their air space. Iraq used Tu-22 Blinder and Tu-16 Badger strategic bombers to carry out long-range high-speed raids on Iranian cities, including Tehran. Fighter-bombers such as the MiG-25 Foxbat and Su-22 Fitter were used against smaller or shorter range targets, as well as escorting the strategic bombers. Civilian and industrial targets were hit by the raids, and each successful raid inflicted economic damage from regular strategic bombing.

In response, the Iranians deployed F-4 Phantoms to combat the Iraqis, and eventually they deployed F-14s as well. By 1986, Iran expanded its air defense network to take the load of the fighting off of the air force. Later in the war, Iraqi raids primarily consisted of missile attacks while air attacks were used on fewer, more important targets. Starting in 1987, Saddam Hussein ordered several chemical attacks on civilian targets in Iran, such as the town of Sardasht.

Iran launched several retaliatory air raids on Iraq, while primarily shelling border cities such as Basra. Iran bought some Scud missiles from Libya and launched them against Baghdad. These too inflicted damage upon Iraq.

On 7 February 1984, during the first war of the cities, Saddam ordered his air force to attack eleven Iranian cities. Bombardments ceased on 22 February 1984. Iran struck back, hitting Baghdad and other Iraqi cities.

The attacks resulted in tens of thousands of civilian casualties on both sides, and became known as the first "war of the cities". It was estimated that 4,700 Iranian civilians were killed and 22,000 were wounded during the raids in February alone. There were five such major exchanges throughout the course of the war, and multiple minor ones. While interior cities such as Tehran, Tabriz, Qom, Isfahan and Shiraz did receive numerous raids, it was the cities of western Iran that suffered the most death and destruction.

=== Campaigns ===
Five campaigns of systematic Iraqi and Iranian air raids were conducted over eight years.

The first campaign, initiated by the Iraqi Army, lasted from February 7 to 22, 1984, and was conducted in response to the Iranian refusal to observe a ceasefire.

The second campaign was conducted from March 22 to April 8, 1985, in response to Iranian Operation Badr. This campaign attacked many Iranian urban areas in western Iran, including Tehran, Tabriz, Shiraz, and Isfahan.

The third campaign lasted from January 17 to 25, 1987, in response to Iranian Operation Dawn 8.

The fourth campaign was from February to April 1987.

The fifth campaign was the most intensive, and was conducted by Iraq once the Iranian front lines showed elements of weakening. It was conducted in January-February 1988, and involved missile attacks on some Iranian cities.

== Casualties and aftermath ==
Iraq fired 533 ballistic missiles against Iran, of which 414 missiles (77.7%) struck 27 Iranian cities. These caused the deaths of 2,312 civilians, while a further 11,625 were injured. Three types of ballistic missiles were used: FROG-7, Scud, and Al-Hussein. Tehran was hit by 118 missiles over the course of 52 days, which killed 422 civilians and injured 1,572 more, an average of 5 deaths per missile strike.

The conflict triggered the initiation of Iran's missile program by the IRGC.

== In popular culture ==
The war era has become the theme of many films, with some of them representing the situation of cities in the wartime. For example, Union of the God (1992) portrays the general image of Tehran as a quiet city that turned to a location of a missile war and sometimes this calmness and quietness breaks with the sound of ambulances and fire-fighting alarms.

Under the Shadow (2016) portrays Tehran during the war of the cities.

== Sources ==
- Farrokh, Kaveh (2011). Iran at War: 1500–1988. Oxford: Osprey Publishing. ISBN 978-1-84603-491-6.
- Goharipour, Hamed (2016). "A Review of Urban Images of Tehran in the Iranian Post-revolution Cinema". In Arefian, Fatemeh Farnaz; Moeini, Seyed Hossein Iradj (eds.). Urban Change in Iran: Stories of Rooted Histories and Ever-accelerating Developments. Cham, Switzerland: Springer International. pp. 47–57. ISBN 978-3-319-26113-3.
- Karsh, Efraim (2002). The Iran–Iraq War: 1980–1988. Oxford: Osprey Publishing. ISBN 1-84176-371-3.
