= Iranian missile tests =

Testing of Iranian-made missiles

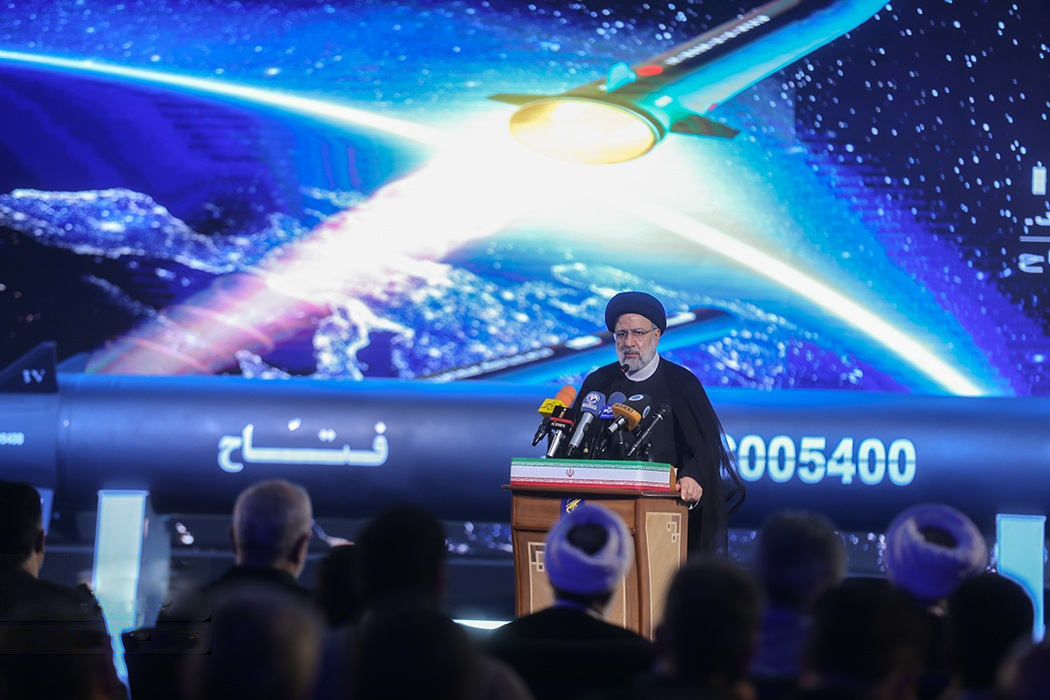
Fatah hypersonic ballistic missile unveiling ceremony, June 16, 2023

Iran has been testing and producing missiles to increase its military capabilities, and as such, has performed a series of tests on increasingly advanced types of missiles, including ballistic missiles.

== Background ==
The Iranian missile program began during the so-called War of the Cities during which Iraq began deliberately attacking civilian targets in Iran.

== List of missile tests ==
- On 10 October 2015, Iran tested precised Emad missile that has a declared range of 1700 km and a new precision guidance system.
- On 21 November 2015, Iran reportedly carried out a test of the Ghadr-110, having a range variously reported between 1500 and 2000 km.
- On 8 and 9 March 2016, Iran test fired several missiles, including the Qiam 1.
- On 29 January 2017, Iran tested the medium-range Khorramshahr ballistic missile that flew 600 miles before exploding, in a failed test of a reentry vehicle.
- On 23 September 2017, Iran tested another ballistic missile after showing it off at a military parade in Tehran.
- Between February and August 2018, Iran conducted seven test flights: one Khorramshahr, two Shahab-3 variants, one Qiam and three Zolfaghar ballistic missiles. According to the president of the U.N. Security Council, was "in violation of resolution 2231" because the missiles were all category I systems under the Missile Technology Control and not capable of carrying nuclear warheads.
- In August 2018, Iran's defense ministry unveiled two new missiles: the Fakour and the "Fateh Mobin" (Bright Conqueror), the latest addition to the Fateh-series of short-range tactical ballistic missiles with a range of about 1,300 kilometers (810 miles).
- On Dec. 1, 2018, the Khorramshahr medium-range ballistic missile was tested at its facility near Shahrud, in northeast Iran.
- On Feb. 2, 2019, Tehran announced the successful test of the Hoveizeh cruise missile with a range of more than 1,350 kilometers (838 miles) during celebrations marking the 40th anniversary of the 1979 Revolution.
- On Feb. 7, 2019, the Dezful ballistic missile was unveiled, with a range of 1,000 kilometers (600 miles). Iran's Press TV quoted Hajizadeh as saying the Revolutionary Guards will "continue missile tests ... and plan to carry out more than 50 missile tests each year."

== Reactions ==
After the March 2016 test firing, the U.S. asked the UN Security Council to discuss the tests. US ambassador to the UN Samantha Power said the tests were provocative and destabilizing. At least one missile had "ישראל צריכה להמחק מעל פני האדמה" ("Israel must be wiped off the face of the earth") written on them in Hebrew. Sources differ on whether the tests violate Security Council resolutions.

On 29 March 2016, the US, Britain, France, and Germany wrote a joint letter to UN chief Ban Ki-moon accusing Iran of "defying" Security Council Resolution 2231 that endorsed the July 2015 deal. The letter said the missiles were "inherently capable of delivering nuclear weapons". However, it stopped short of saying the tests were illegal. Resolution 2231 calls for Iran to refrain from activity related to nuclear-capable missiles, but according to diplomats the language is not legally binding and cannot be enforced with punitive measures.

After the 29 January 2017 missile test by Iran, on 3 February, the Trump administration imposed sanctions on Iran's 25 individuals and entities, which it said were but "initial steps", with Trump's National Security Advisor Michael T. Flynn adding that ″the days of turning a blind eye to Iran's hostile and belligerent actions toward the United States and the world community are over.″

== See also ==
- Iran's ballistic-missile program
- Iranian underground missile bases
- Air Force of the Army of the Guardians of the Islamic Revolution § Missile forces
- Defense industry of Iran
- Sanctions against Iran
