= United Nations Security Council Resolution 1835 =

UN Security Council Resolution 1835
- Iran
- Date: 27 September 2008
- Meeting no.: 5,984
- Code: S/RES/1835 (Document)
- Subject: Non-proliferation; Iran
- Voting summary: 15 voted for; None voted against; None abstained
- Result: Adopted

Security Council composition
- Permanent members: China; France; Russia; United Kingdom; United States
- Non-permanent members: Burkina Faso; Belgium; Costa Rica; Croatia; Indonesia; Italy; Libya; Panama; South Africa; Vietnam

UN Security Council Resolution 1835 was adopted unanimously by United Nations Security Council on 27 September 2008. The resolution was in response to 15 September report of the International Atomic Energy Agency (IAEA) that stated that Iran had not suspended uranium-enrichment-related activities. The resolution reaffirmed four previous Security Council resolutions: 1696 (2006), 1737 (2006), 1747 (2007), and 1803 (2008).

== Background ==
On 15 September 2008, the International Atomic Energy Agency (IAEA) released a report on the execution of Nuclear Non-Proliferation Treaty (NPT) regulations in Iran. The report also investigated Iran's acquiescence to Security Council Resolutions 1737, 1747, and 1803. The report found conclusively that Iran was continuing along its path of non-compliance. In addition, the report included two important findings about Iran's non-compliance. The report found that Iran is making significant progress on developing and operating its centrifuges and that it continues to resist efforts to address its suspected nuclear weapons work.

== 5984th Council Meeting ==
The 5984th meeting of the UN Security Council took place on 27 September 2008. The P5+1 countries; United States, United Kingdom, France, Germany, Russia, and the People's Republic of China, proposed the resolution. The resolution was passed unanimously. The meeting lasted from 4:05 pm to 4:10 pm. The representative of Indonesia voted in favor of the resolution despite making a statement before the vote was taken. The representative, who had abstained from voting for resolution 1803 in 2008, declared Indonesia's support for the resolution because it did not provide for additional sanctions against Iran. He emphasized Indonesia's desire for a negotiated solution, one that provided incentives, not "discentives" to Iran.

== Public reaction ==
=== Iran ===
Iran dismissed the resolution, saying that its uranium development was for peaceful purposes and that it would not stop its uranium enrichment programs. The president of Iran, Mahmoud Ahmadinejad announced that his country would resist "bullying powers" trying to prevent nuclear development in Iran. The Chief Nuclear Negotiator, Saeed Jalili told Iranian television that the resolution would only foster "mistrust" stating, "These [resolutions] are not constructive. What they need to do is to attract the trust of the Iranian nation through constructive co-operation and collective commitment".

=== United States ===
Condoleezza Rice, the Secretary of State of the United States, declared US support for the resolution saying that it was a positive step that confirms the resolve of the international community and the P5+1. Rice also stated that the resolution lets "the Iranians know that the unity is very strong".

=== Russia ===
Vitaly Churkin, Russia's UN Representative, claimed that the idea for the resolution had been his country's. The week before the resolution was passed, Russian Foreign Minister Sergei Lavrov pulled out of talks on Iran's nuclear program. Furthermore, Lavrov stated that it was Russian belief that the resolution helps further "the primary goal" of the P5+1, which is "to help the IAEA ascertain that there is no military dimension to the nuclear program in Iran".

== Termination ==
The provisions of Resolution 1835 were terminated by United Nations Security Council Resolution 2231 effective on Implementation Day of the Joint Comprehensive Plan of Action, 16 January 2016.
