= United Nations Security Council Resolution 1929 =

United Nations Security Council resolution

UN Security Council Resolution 1929
- Iran
- Date: 9 June 2010
- Meeting no.: 6,335
- Code: S/RES/1929 (Document)
- Subject: Non-proliferation; Iran
- Voting summary: 12 voted for; 2 voted against; 1 abstained
- Result: Adopted

Security Council composition
- Permanent members: China; France; Russia; United Kingdom; United States
- Non-permanent members: Austria; Bosnia–Herzegovina; Brazil; Gabon; Japan; Lebanon; Mexico; Nigeria; Turkey; Uganda

United Nations Security Council Resolution 1929, adopted on 9 June 2010, after recalling resolutions 1696 (2006), 1737 (2006), 1747 (2007), 1803 (2008), 1835 (2008) and 1887 (2009) concerning the topics of Iran and non-proliferation, the Council noted that Iran had failed to comply with previous Security Council resolutions concerning its nuclear program and imposed further sanctions on the country.

The resolution, which imposed a fourth round of sanctions against Iran over its nuclear program, was adopted by twelve votes for the resolution, two against from Brazil and Turkey, with one abstention from Lebanon.

== Resolution ==
=== Observations ===
In the preamble of the resolution, the Council reaffirmed its commitment to the Nuclear Non-Proliferation Treaty, its provisions therein and obligations on parties to the Treaty. The International Atomic Energy Agency (IAEA) Board of Governors had adopted a resolution stating that a solution to the Iranian nuclear issue would contribute to global non-proliferation efforts and the Middle East region free of weapons of mass destruction. There was concern that Iran had not yet fully suspended uranium enrichment activities, resumed co-operation with the IAEA or clarified issues relating to a possible military dimension to its nuclear program.

The Council recognised that access to diverse, reliable energy was critical for sustainable development, and emphasised the rights of states in international trade. It called upon Iran to ratify the Comprehensive Nuclear-Test-Ban Treaty and was determined to take appropriate measures to make Iran comply with provisions in previous Security Council resolutions and requirements of the IAEA.

=== Acts ===
Acting under Article 41 of Chapter VII of the United Nations Charter, the Council determined that the Iranian government had yet to meet the requirements of previous Security Council resolutions and IAEA requirements. It affirmed that Iran should immediately co-operate with the IAEA on all outstanding issues, particularly with regard to activity at Qom, clarifications on a possible military use of the nuclear program and granting unrestricted access to all sites, persons, equipment and documents requested by the IAEA. The Council also decided that Iran should comply with the Safeguards Agreement with the IAEA, not undertake any further reprocessing, heavy water-related or enrichment-related activities or acquire commercial interests in other states involving uranium mining or use of nuclear materials and technology.

Provisions of the resolution included:

- Iran is prohibited from investing in sensitive nuclear activities abroad, like uranium enrichment and reprocessing activities, where it could acquire nuclear technology and know-how, as well as activities involving ballistic missiles capable of delivering nuclear weapons. The ban also applies to investment in uranium mining.
- States are prohibited from selling or in any way transferring to Iran eight broad categories of heavy weapons (battle tanks, armored combat vehicles, large caliber artillery systems, combat aircraft, attack helicopters, warships, missiles or missile systems). States are similarly prohibited from providing technical or financial assistance for such systems, or spare parts. States are also to exercise vigilance and restraint in supplying any other arms or related materiel to Iran.
- Iran is prohibited from undertaking any activity related to ballistic missiles capable of carrying nuclear weapons and States are required to take all necessary measure to prevent the transfer of related technology or technical assistance.
- The resolution updates and adds to the list of technical items related to nuclear and missile proliferation that are banned for transfer to and from Iran.
- Iran is subject to a new regime for inspection of suspicious cargo to detect and stop Iran's smuggling. States should inspect any vessel on their territory suspected of carrying prohibited cargo, including banned conventional arms or sensitive nuclear or missile items. States are also expected to cooperate in such inspections on the high seas.
- Once prohibited items are found, States are now obligated to seize and dispose of the items.
- States are required not to provide critical support services (e.g., fuel, water) to ships suspected of carrying prohibited cargo.
- States must require their nationals to exercise vigilance over IRISL, a known sanctions violator. Three IRISL-related companies will have their assets frozen. States are requested to report any information on activities by IRISL and Iran's Air's cargo division to evade sanctions, including by renaming vessels.
- States are called upon to prevent any financial service – including insurance or reinsurance – and freeze any asset that could contribute to Iran's proliferation. This broad language will help states take action when there are suspected financial links to Iran's banned nuclear activities.
- States are required to ensure their nationals exercise vigilance when doing business with any Iranian firm, including IRGC and IRISL, to make sure such business does not contribute to Iran's proliferation.
- States are called upon to prohibit on their territories new banking relationships with Iran, including the opening of any new branches of Iranian banks, joint ventures and correspondent banking relationships, if there is a suspected link to proliferation. States also should prohibit their own financial institutions from opening branches in Iran if there is a suspected link to proliferation.
- The resolution highlights the IRGC's role in proliferation and requires states to mandate that businesses exercise vigilance over all transactions involving the IRGC. Fifteen IRGC-related companies linked to proliferation will have their assets frozen.
- Forty Iranian companies and one individual will be subject to an asset freeze. The individual – the head of a critical nuclear research program – will also be subject to a travel ban. Thirty-five additional individuals previously subject to "travel vigilance" will now be subject to a travel ban.
- A UN "Panel of Experts" will be established to monitor states' implementation of the sanctions, report on sanctions violations and recommend ways to continually improve enforcement.

Throughout the imposition of the aforementioned measures, exceptions were made for humanitarian purposes and legal economic activities.

The Security Council deplored the transfer of arms by Iran to other countries in violation of Resolution 1747 and directed the Committee to respond to violations and promote the implementation of previous resolutions. The Secretary-General Ban Ki-moon was requested to establish a panel consisting of up to eight experts for an initial period of one year to assist the Committee in its mandate; examine information presented by countries, particularly with regard to instances of non-compliance; make recommendations to the Council and report on its findings and recommendations.

All states were to report to the Committee within 60 days on the measures they had taken to implement the provisions of the current resolution. It emphasised diplomatic efforts by the five plus one (China, France, Germany, Russia, the United Kingdom and United States) to resolve the nuclear issue and encouraged further efforts. It commended the Director-General of the IAEA Yukiya Amano for a draft agreement between France, Iran and Russia and requested a report within 90 days on whether Iran had begun co-operating with the IAEA and suspended activities mentioned in Resolution 1737. On the basis of the report, the Council would review the sanctions regime and would lift provisions if compliance was reported or consider further measures in the light of non-compliance with Security Council resolutions.

== Voting ==
The resolution was adopted after receiving 12 votes for the resolution, two against (Brazil and Turkey) and one abstention (Lebanon).

Approved (12)	Abstained (1)	Opposed (2)
Austria; Bosnia and Herzegovina; **China**; **France**; Gabon; Japan; Mexico; Nigeria; **Russia**; **United Kingdom**; **United States**; Uganda	Lebanon	Brazil; Turkey

* Permanent members of the Security Council are in bold.

== Reactions ==
=== Iran ===
Iranian President Mahmoud Ahmadinejad described the new resolution as a "used handkerchief which should be thrown in the dustbin".

In an e-mail interview to the British newspaper The Guardian, the Iranian reformist politician Mehdi Karroubi argued these sanctions would actually strengthen the Ahmadinejad regime by offering "an excuse to the Iranian government to suppress the opposition".

=== Turkey and Brazil ===
Brazil and Turkey criticised the sanctions, saying they could undermine further diplomatic efforts. Brazil and Turkey had just previously attempted to mediate the dispute, concluding negotiations with Iran which led to the Tehran Declaration, but which was not accepted by the P5+1.

== Violations ==
On 10 or 11 October 2015, Iran tested a missile that the United States said was "inherently capable" of carrying a nuclear warhead.

== Termination ==
The provisions of Resolution 1929 were terminated by United Nations Security Council Resolution 2231 effective on Implementation Day of the Joint Comprehensive Plan of Action, 16 January 2016.

== See also ==
- Iran and weapons of mass destruction
- Nuclear facilities in Iran
- Nuclear program of Iran
- Sanctions against Iran
