= United Nations Security Council Resolution 2231 =

UN Security Council Resolution 2231
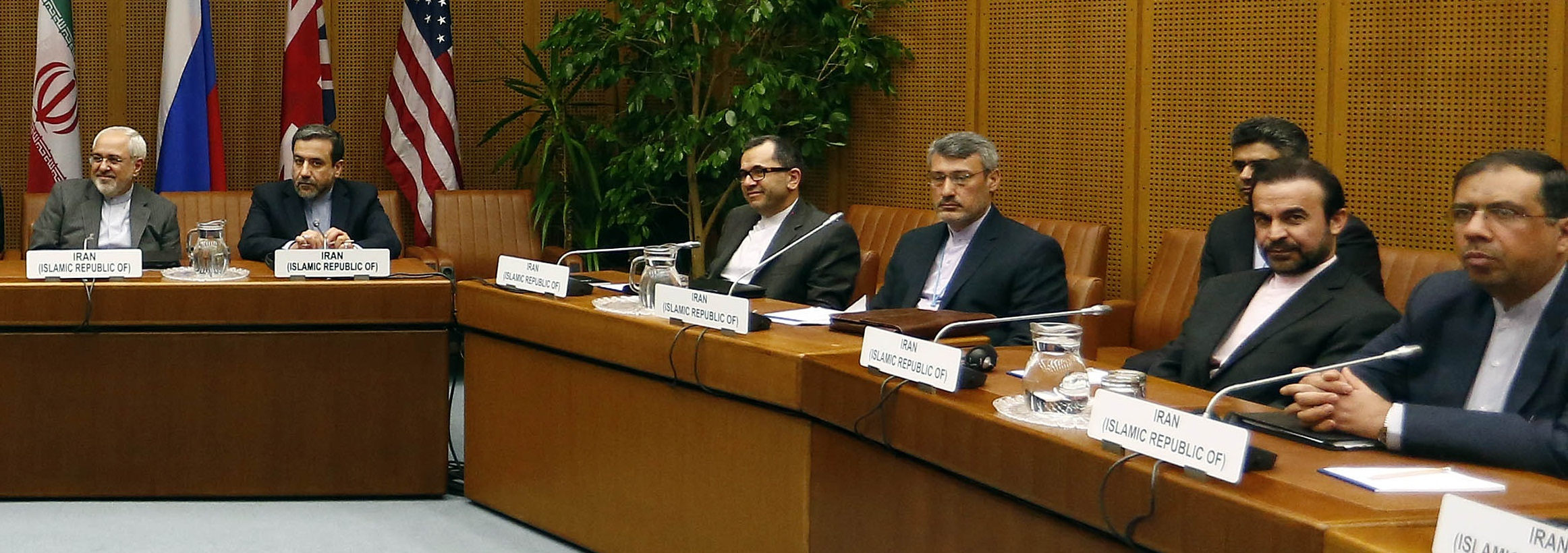
- Iran Nuclear Negotiators in 2014
- Date: 20 July 2015
- Meeting no.: 7488
- Code: S/RES/2231 (Document)
- Subject: Nuclear program of Iran
- Voting summary: 15 voted for; None voted against; None abstained; None absent
- Result: Adopted

Security Council composition
- Permanent members: China; France; Russia; United Kingdom; United States
- Non-permanent members: Angola; Chad; Chile; Jordan; Lithuania; Malaysia; New Zealand; Nigeria; Spain; Venezuela

United Nations Security Council Resolution 2231 was a 20 July 2015 resolution endorsing the Joint Comprehensive Plan of Action (JCPOA) on the nuclear program of Iran. It sets out an inspection process and schedule while also preparing for the removal of United Nations sanctions against Iran. At the same time, negotiators built in an emergency snapback mechanism as a safeguard for the deal's enforcers: if Iran were to violate its commitments, sanctions could be swiftly reimposed without the risk of a veto in the Security Council. The unprecedented snapback provision helped secure support for the JCPOA by ensuring that any violations by Iran could be met with a rapid restoration of international sanctions. The U.N. Security Council unanimously endorsed the JCPOA through Resolution 2231 on July 20, 2015, incorporating this mechanism into international law.

On 29 March 2016, the United States, the UK, France, and Germany wrote a joint letter to Secretary-General of the United Nations Ban Ki-moon accusing Iran of "defying" Security Council Resolution 2231 through missile tests conducted since the deal. In May 2018, U.S. unilaterally withdrew from JCPOA, reimposed the sanctions that had been lifted by the agreement, and started the maximum pressure campaign against Iran, despite the fact that IAEA continued to certify Iran's compliance with the agreement. In February 2019, the IAEA certified that Iran was still abiding by the international Joint Comprehensive Plan of Action (JCPOA) of 2015. However, on 8 May 2019, one year after U.S. withdrawal from JCPOA, Iran announced it would suspend implementation of some parts of the JCPOA, threatening further action in 60 days unless it received protection from US sanctions. In early July 2025, Iran suspended co-operation with the United Nations' International Atomic Energy Agency (IAEA), and all IAEA inspectors left Iran by July 4.

In July 2025, E3 members, Britain, France and Germany, warned that the snapback mechanism would be triggered if no progress was made in the nuclear talks by the end of August 2025. As a result, Iran turned to Russia and China in order to discuss the threat of sanctions and to strengthen the military ties between them. On August 28, 2025, E3 members, France, Germany, and the United Kingdom, initiated the process of the snapback mechanism, asserting that Iran had violated its commitments.

== Description ==
United Nations Security Council Resolution 2231 was a 20 July 2015 resolution endorsing the Joint Comprehensive Plan of Action (JCPOA) on the nuclear program of Iran. It sets out an inspection process and schedule while also preparing for the removal of United Nations sanctions against Iran. The 15 nations on the Security Council unanimously endorsed the resolution, which had been negotiated by the permanent members of the United Nations Security Council—China, France, Russia, the United Kingdom, and the United States—plus Germany, the European Union, and Iran.

At the same time, negotiators built in an emergency snapback mechanism as a safeguard for the deal's enforcers: if Iran were to violate its commitments, sanctions could be swiftly reimposed without the risk of a veto in the Security Council. This snapback provision, described as an unprecedented diplomatic tool, helped secure support for the JCPOA by ensuring that any "significant non-performance" by Iran could be met with a rapid restoration of international sanctions. The U.N. Security Council unanimously endorsed the JCPOA through Resolution 2231 on July 20, 2015, incorporating this mechanism into international law.

== Iran's reaction ==
After the resolution, Iran's then–Foreign Minister Mohammad Javad Zarif stated that: "the Iranian nation should feel fundamental changes in accordance with the UN Security Council Resolution 2231".

== U.S. withdrawal from JCPOA and accusation of Iranian non-compliance ==
=== 2016 missile tests ===
On 29 March 2016, the United States, the UK, France, and Germany wrote a joint letter to Secretary-General of the United Nations Ban Ki-moon accusing Iran of "defying" Security Council Resolution 2231 through missile tests conducted since the deal. The letter said the missiles were "inherently capable of delivering nuclear weapons". However, it stopped short of saying the tests were illegal. Resolution 2231 calls for Iran to refrain from activity related to nuclear-capable missiles ("Iran is called upon not to undertake any activity related to ballistic missiles designed to be capable of delivering nuclear weapons, including launches using such ballistic missile technology"), but according to unnamed diplomats in a Deutsche Welle report, the language is not legally binding and cannot be enforced with punitive measures.

=== 2018 U.S. withdrawal from JCPOA ===
In May 2018, U.S. unilaterally withdrew from JCPOA, reimposed the sanctions that had been lifted by the agreement, and started the maximum pressure campaign against Iran, despite the fact that IAEA continued to certify Iran's compliance with the agreement.

=== 2020 drone attacks ===
On 9 June 2020, U.N. Secretary-General António Guterres stated in his biennial report to the UNSC on the Iran arms embargo that cruise missiles used in multiple 2019 attacks on Saudi Arabia had Iranian origin. Cruise missiles or drones used in the 2019 Afif attack, the 2019 Abqaiq–Khurais attack and the 2019 Abha International Airport attacks had Iranian origin, as were several items of materiel interdicted by the US in November 2019 and February 2020. Some items were allegedly transferred between February 2016 and April 2018 in a matter possibly "inconsistent" with Resolution 2231:

The Secretariat assesses that the cruise missiles and/or parts thereof used in the four attacks are of Iranian origin.

At the time, US Ambassador to the UN Kelly Craft said that as a result of the Guterres report she would "circulate a draft resolution to extend the arms embargo on Iran soon". Diplomats said Washington could likely face a "tough, messy battle".

=== 2022 trafficking drones to Russia ===
On 18 October 2022 the U.S. State Department accused Iran of violating Resolution 2231 by selling Shahed 131 and Shahed 136 drones to Russia, agreeing with similar assessments by France and the United Kingdom. Iran denied sending arms for use in the Russian invasion of Ukraine. On 22 October France, Britain and Germany formally called for an investigation by the UN team responsible for UNSCR 2231.

Responding to these accusations, Iran's ambassador to the UN wrote to the UNSC on 19 October and 24 October that this was an erroneous interpretation of paragraph 4 of annex B of the resolution, which clearly states it applies to items that "could contribute to the development of nuclear weapon delivery systems", which these drones could not.

On 26 October, the procedural matter of if a group of member states could request the Secretariat to conduct an investigation rather than the Security Council as a whole deciding the matter was discussed at a meeting of the UNSC, with the United Nations Legal Counsel Miguel de Serpa Soares stating that United Nations Secretary-General and Secretariat staff "must not seek or receive instructions from any Government" but can take note of information brought to its attention.

=== 2018-2025 erosion of nuclear deal ===
In February 2019, the IAEA certified that Iran was still abiding by the international Joint Comprehensive Plan of Action (JCPOA) of 2015. However, on 8 May 2019, one year after U.S. withdrawal from JCPOA, Iran announced it would suspend implementation of some parts of the JCPOA, threatening further action in 60 days unless it received protection from US sanctions. In July 2019, the IAEA confirmed that Iran had breached both the 300 kg enriched uranium stockpile limit and the 3.67% refinement limit. On 5 November 2019, Iranian nuclear chief Ali Akbar Salehi announced that Iran would enrich uranium to 5% at the Fordow Fuel Enrichment Plant, adding that the country had the capability to enrich uranium to 20% if needed. Also in November, Behrouz Kamalvandi, spokesman for the Atomic Energy Organization of Iran, stated that Iran can enrich up to 60% if needed. President Hassan Rouhani declared that Iran's nuclear program would be "limitless" while the country launches the third phase of quitting from the 2015 nuclear deal.

On January 5, 2020, two days after the US assassinated Iranian Quds Force commander Qasem Soleimani, Iran's government declared it would no longer observe any JCPOA limits on uranium enrichment capacity, levels, or stockpile size. In March 2020, the IAEA said that Iran had nearly tripled its stockpile of enriched uranium since early November 2019. In September 2020, the IAEA reported that Iran had accumulated ten times as much enriched uranium as permitted by the JCPOA.

Throughout 2021 and 2022, Iran installed cascades of advanced centrifuges (IR-2m, IR-4, IR-6) at Natanz and Fordow, significantly increasing its enrichment output. In February 2021, the IAEA reported that Iran stopped allowing access to data from nuclear sites, as well as plans for future sites. In April 2021, a sabotage attack struck the Natanz enrichment plant, causing an electrical blackout and damaging centrifuges. Iran responded by further increasing enrichment: days later, it began producing 60% enriched uranium, an unprecedented level for Iran, just short of weapons-grade (90% and above). This 60% enrichment took place at Natanz, and later at Fordow as well, yielding a stockpile that as of early 2023 exceeded ~70 kg of 60% uranium. If Iran chose to enrich this material to 90%, it would be sufficient for several nuclear warheads. The UK, France, and Germany said that Iran has "no credible civilian use for uranium metal" and called the news "deeply concerning" because of its "potentially grave military implications". On 25 June 2022, in a meeting with the senior diplomat of the EU, Ali Shamkhani, Iran's top security officer, declared that Iran would continue to advance its nuclear program until the West modifies its "illegal behavior".

In July 2022, according to an IAEA report referred to by Reuters, Iran had increased its uranium enrichment through the use of sophisticated equipment at its underground Fordow plant in a configuration that can more quickly vary between enrichment levels. In September 2022, Germany, United Kingdom and France expressed doubts over Iran's sincerity in returning to the JCPOA after Tehran insisted that the IAEA close its probes into uranium traces at three undeclared Iranian sites. The IAEA said it could not guarantee the peaceful nature of Iran's nuclear program, stating there had been "no progress in resolving questions about the past presence of nuclear material at undeclared sites". United Nations Secretary-General António Guterres urged Iran to hold "serious dialogue" about nuclear inspections and said IAEA's independence is "essential" in response to Iranian demands to end probes. In February 2023, the IAEA reported having found uranium in Iran enriched to 84%. The Iranian government has claimed that this is an "unintended fluctuation" in the enrichment levels, though the Iranians have been openly enriching uranium to 60% purity, a breach of the 2015 nuclear deal. In 2024, Iranian President Masoud Pezeshkian expressed interest in reopening discussions with the United States on the nuclear deal.

In November 2024, Iran announced that it would make new advanced centrifuges after IAEA condemned Iranians' non-compliance and secrecy.

In January 2025, it was reported that Iran was developing long-range missile technology under the Islamic Revolutionary Guard Corps (IRGC), with some designs based on North Korean models. According to the National Council of Resistance of Iran (NCRI), these missiles, such as the Ghaem-100 and Simorgh, could carry nuclear warheads and reach targets as far as 3,000 kilometres (1,900 mi) away, including parts of Europe.

In March 2025, US President Donald Trump sent a letter to Ali Khamenei seeking to reopen negotiations. Ayatollah Ali Khamenei later said, "Some bullying governments insist on negotiations not to resolve issues but to impose their own expectations," which was seen as in response to the letter.

In late March 2025, Khamenei's top advisor Ali Larijani said Iran would have no choice but to develop nuclear weapons if attacked by the United States, Israel or its allies.

In April 2025, Trump revealed that Iran had decided to undertake talks with the United States for an agreement over its nuclear program. On 12 April, both countries held their first high-level meeting in Oman, followed by a second meeting on 19 April in Italy. On May 16, Trump sent Iran an offer and said they have to move quickly or else bad things would happen. On May 17, Khamenei condemned Trump, saying that he lied about wanting peace and that he was not worth responding to, calling the US demands "outrageous nonsense". Khamenei also reiterated that Israel is a "cancerous tumour" that must be uprooted.

On 31 May 2025, IAEA reported that Iran had sharply increased its stockpile of uranium enriched to 60% purity, just below weapons-grade, reaching over 408 kilograms, a nearly 50% rise since February. The agency warned that this amount is enough for multiple nuclear weapons if further enriched. It also noted that Iran remains the only non-nuclear-weapon state to produce such material, calling the situation a "serious concern". In June 2025, the NCRI said Iran is pursuing nuclear weapons through a new program called the "Kavir Plan". According to the NCRI, the new project involves six sites in Semnan province working on warheads and related technology, succeeding the previous AMAD Project.

On June 10, Trump stated that Iran was becoming "much more aggressive" in the negotiations. On 11 June, the Iranian regime threatened US bases in the Middle East, with Defense Minister Aziz Nasirzadeh stating, "If a conflict is imposed on us... all US bases are within our reach, and we will boldly target them in host countries." The US embassy in Iraq evacuated all personnel. The Iran-backed Yemen-based Houthi movement threatened to attack the United States if a strike on Iran were to occur. CENTCOM presented a wide range of military options for an attack on Iran. UK issued threat advisory for ships in the Persian Gulf. US Secretary of Defense Pete Hegseth told Congress that Iran was attempting a nuclear breakout.

On 12 June 2025, IAEA found Iran non-compliant with its nuclear obligations for the first time in 20 years. Iran retaliated by announcing it would launch a new enrichment site and install advanced centrifuges. On the night of June 13, Israel initiated Operation Rising Lion, a large‑scale aerial assault targeting Iranian nuclear facilities, missile factories, military sites, and commanders across cities including Tehran and Natanz.

On 13 June 2025, Israel attacked Iranian nuclear facilities as part of the June 2025 Israeli strikes on Iran.

On 21 June, the US bombed the Fordow Fuel Enrichment Plant, the Natanz Nuclear Facility, and the Isfahan nuclear technology center. In an address from the White House, Trump claimed "Iran's key nuclear enrichment facilities have been completely and totally obliterated," though later reporting said only one site (Fordow) was "mostly destroyed."

In early July 2025, Iran suspended co-operation with the United Nations' International Atomic Energy Agency (IAEA), and all IAEA inspectors left Iran by July 4.

=== 2026 ===
On September 17, Russia and China vetoed a US-supported resolution at the UN Security Council that aimed to continue monitoring sanctions on Iran. This resolution aimed to extend the mandate of the Panel of Experts to continue monitoring sanctions that were reinstated last year after the IAEA found Iran in non-compliance with its safeguards agreement. Despite 11 members voting in favor, the resolution failed due to the vetoes. Iran expressed gratitude to Russia and China for opposing what it called a politically motivated US draft resolution.

== Motions to snapback sanctions ==
On 14 August 2020, a proposal by the US to extend arms restrictions on Iran set to expire in October of that year under resolution 2231 was defeated at the Security Council, with only the Dominican Republic voting with the US in favour, while China and Russia voted against. The remaining 11 members of the council, which included UK, German, French, Belgian, and Estonian delegations, abstained from the vote. In response to the defeat, the Iranian ambassador to the United Nations Majid Takht-Ravanchi remarked that "the result of the vote in [the UNSC] on arms embargo against Iran shows—once more—the US' isolation. Council's message: no to unilateralism".

On 19 August 2020, US Secretary of State Mike Pompeo said that his government intends to utilize the so-called snapback provision in ¶11 of the document, in which any member of the JCPOA can "demand the restoration of all UN sanctions". The motion for the snapback, which is intended in case of significant Iranian non-compliance with the resolution, "starts a 30-day clock during which the UNSC must vote affirmatively to continue the sanctions relief that Iran was given in return for curbs on its nuclear program". This UNSC vote "cannot be blocked by a veto".

On 16 September 2020, Elliott Abrams, the US "special envoy for Iran", announced that all UN sanctions would "snap back" at 20:00 EDT on 19 September. Abrams said that "We expect all UN member states to implement their member state responsibilities and respect their obligations to uphold these sanctions. If other nations do not follow it, I think they should be asked... whether they do not think they are weakening the structure of UN sanctions." Other nations advocate a position whereby when the US abrogated the JCPOA it excluded itself from the JCPOA membership and hence no longer can benefit from the JCPOA.

The embargo on conventional Iranian arms ended in October 2020 while restrictions on Iran regarding missiles and related technologies ended in October 2023.

=== 2025 Snapback negotiations ===
In July 2025, E3 members, Britain, France and Germany, warned that the snapback mechanism would be triggered if no progress was made in the nuclear talks by the end of August 2025. As a result, Iran turned to Russia and China in order to discuss the threat of sanctions and to strengthen the military ties between them.

On 14 July 2025, amid possible snapback activation by E3, Foreign Ministry spokesman Esmaeil Baqaei warned of consequences and threatened that should it be triggered it would "be met with a proportionate and appropriate response", without elaborating.

On 25 July 2025, after Iranian foreign minister declared that Iran would not abandon its nuclear program nor would it ever halt its enrichment of uranium, negotiations between E3 and Iran were held in Istanbul. Iran's Deputy Foreign Minister Kazem Gharibabadi warned that triggering sanctions "is completely illegal", and Iranian diplomats threatened that Iran would leave the global nuclear non-proliferation treaty if U.N. sanctions were to be reinstated.

On 8 August 2025, after Iran did not respond to an offer of extension for the negotiation deadline, E3 sent a letter to the UN in which they declared that they were prepared to trigger the snapback mechanism "should no satisfactory solution be reached by the end of August 2025". In response, Iranian Parliament member of the Commission on National Security and Foreign Policy, Amir Hayat Moghadam, stated that all of Europe, and in particular Britain, France and Germany is in range of Iranian missiles, while major US cities such as Washington and New York, may be targeted by missiles launched from the sea. Simultaneously, according to the Telegraph, senior officials of the Islamic Republic stated that it would not have the financial or military ability to withstand the snapback sanctions, and that their consequences would be more damaging than war.

== Snapback deadline ==
As Resolution 2231 and the JCPOA approached their scheduled expiration on 18 October 2025, the Security Council faced a final opportunity to invoke the snapback mechanism. This mechanism allowed any JCPOA participant to notify the Council of significant Iranian non-compliance, thereby triggering the automatic reimposition of previously lifted UN sanctions unless a new resolution to maintain sanctions relief is adopted within 30 days. The process is not subject to veto by permanent Council members. The European parties to the JCPOA - France, the United Kingdom, and Germany - signaled a potential willingness to consider this step, contingent upon findings from forthcoming reports by the International Atomic Energy Agency (IAEA) regarding Iran's adherence to its nuclear commitments.

If activated, the snapback mechanism was expected to have wide-reaching implications for Iran's energy sector. Reimposed sanctions would likely affect oil and gas exports, maritime shipping, banking, and insurance, while also restricting access to international financial systems and deterring foreign investment. Ongoing efforts to modernize production infrastructure could be disrupted, and access to vital equipment and technology may be curtailed. Iranian officials responded to the potential reactivation of the snapback mechanism with threats of escalatory measures, including a shift in military posture, withdrawal from the Nuclear Non-Proliferation Treaty (NPT), and increased regional destabilization through proxy activity and maritime disruptions.

== Snapback activation ==
On August 28, 2025, E3 members, France, Germany, and the United Kingdom, initiated the process of the snapback mechanism, with the prospect of freezing Iranian overseas assets, blocking arms deals with Iran, imposing penal action against development of Iran's ballistic missile program and further restricting Iran's military and nuclear activities. In a letter addressed to the president of the UN Security Council, the foreign ministers of the E3 stated that since 2019, Iran had "increasingly and deliberately ceased performing its JCPOA commitments", including "the accumulation of a highly enriched uranium stockpile which lacks any credible civiliian justification and is unprecedented for a state without a nuclear weapons program". The letter detailed additional Iranian violations of the agreement despite the fact that the E3 "have consistently upheld their agreements under the terms of the JCPOA". The activation opened a 30-day window, intended to reengage Iran, "whose refusal to cooperate with the International Atomic Energy Agency's (IAEA) inspectors started the crisis", in diplomatic negotiations before full restoration of sanctions. According to Euronews, Iran's Foreign Minister Abbas Araghchi declared that it was "unjustified, illegal, and lacking any legal basis" and promised that "The Islamic Republic of Iran will respond appropriately".

== See also ==
- United Nations Security Council Resolutions 1696, 1737, 1747, 1803, 1835, and 1929
- United Nations Security Council resolutions concerning the nuclear program of Iran
