= United Nations Security Council Resolution 1747 =

UN Security Council Resolution 1747
- Iran
- Date: 24 March 2007
- Meeting no.: 5,647
- Code: S/RES/1747 (Document)
- Subject: Non-proliferation
- Voting summary: 15 voted for; None voted against; None abstained
- Result: Adopted

Security Council composition
- Permanent members: China; France; Russia; United Kingdom; United States
- Non-permanent members: Belgium; Rep. of the Congo; Ghana; Indonesia; Italy; Panama; Peru; Qatar; Slovakia; South Africa

Flag of the United Nations

Flag of Islamic Republic of Iran

United Nations Security Council Resolution 1747 was a United Nations Security Council resolution, written with reference to some IAEA reports, that tightened the sanctions imposed on Iran in connection with the Iranian nuclear program. It was adopted unanimously by the United Nations Security Council on 24 March 2007.

In June 2006, the five permanent Security Council members plus Germany offered a package of economic incentives including transfer of technology in the civilian nuclear field, in exchange for Iran to give up permanently its disputed uranium enrichment programme.

Iran maintains it did not accept this offer because it was not attractive enough and because of its inalienable right to enrich uranium for peaceful purposes. To justify its position, Iran made reference to previous accords concluded between the late Shah of Iran and the West regarding Eurodif and Bushehr. Iran has also referred to similar accords between the West and other countries like North Korea or Libya, where agreements reached and promises made have not been kept. In Resolution 1737, adopted by the Security Council in December 2006, an initial series of sanctions against Iran was implemented because it did not suspend its uranium enrichment programme.

In the Resolution 1747, the Council decided to tighten the sanctions imposed on Iran in connection with that nation's nuclear program. It also resolved to impose a ban on arms sales and to step up the freeze on assets already in place. The successive Security Council interventions and positions are summarized hereafter:

== Background on IAEA inspections ==
Access to nuclear sites: According to the International Atomic Energy Agency (IAEA), Iran had not yet declared the full scope of its programme and has not allowed a full-unrestricted access to all its nuclear sites. The programme is 18 years old, and part of it was outside of the IAEA's purview. This situation worried the IAEA and the international community. Iran said that it has allowed the IAEA to access all its nuclear sites, voluntarily and more than any other country by signing additional NPT protocols.

Iran's previous suspension: Iran said that a previous agreement to suspend uranium enrichment for two years in 2004 did not yield any tangible results for any party. Iran expressed an official concern to disclose more information to the IAEA because of the repeated military threats made by the West since 2005. Subsequently, the IAEA declared that it was unable to conclude there are no undeclared nuclear materials or activities in Iran and has referred the file to the UNSC.

== Statement of intentions ==
United Nations position: The permanent Security Council members, including Russia and China, declared their intentions to prevent Iran from acquiring weapons of mass destruction because of its belligerent rhetoric towards the West and Israel since the Iranian Revolution. In principle, the UN Security Council (UNSC) and the International Atomic Energy Agency (IAEA) have confirmed Iran's right to peaceful nuclear technology in conformity with the Nuclear Non-Proliferation Treaty (NPT).

Iranian stance: Iran said it wanted to build a network of nuclear power plants with a capacity for 20,000 MW by 2020. Iran has referred to its inalienable right to develop nuclear technology for civilian and peaceful purposes under the NPT to justify its position. The Supreme Leader of Iran has stated in a fatwa that possession and use of nuclear weapons is "anti-Islamic". Iranian officials have insisted that they have no intention to develop nuclear weapons. This point has been strongly questioned by the West because uranium enrichment is a dual-use technology.

Iran said it did not intend to suspend its enrichment programme. Iranian Foreign Minister Manouchehr Mottaki told the Security Council after the vote: "The world must know – and it does – that even the harshest political and economic sanctions or other threats are far too weak to coerce the Iranian nation to retreat from their legal and legitimate demands." He added: "Suspension is neither an option nor a solution".

Non-Aligned Movement's position: Iran reminded the Security Council of the Non-Aligned Movement's support for its civilian nuclear programme and its opposition to any military attack against Iran. This declaration by the Non-Aligned Movement, at the summit level, represented 118 countries.

== Nuclear disarmament ==
Iran and weapons of mass destruction: As of 2007, Iran is not known to possess weapons of mass destruction and has signed treaties repudiating their possessions, including the Biological Weapons Convention, the Chemical Weapons Convention, and the Nuclear Non-Proliferation Treaty (NPT). A number of countries, including the United States, the United Kingdom, and France, have accused Iran of a clandestine intention to develop nuclear weapons. By most estimates, Iran is at least two to six years away from being able to produce an atomic bomb, even if it wanted to.

Western hypocrisy: Iran has said it does not accept to be lectured and pressured by the West and it has accused the West of "hypocrisy and double standard". Iran has condemned the Security Council members for not doing what they preach to others: namely, getting rid of their own weapons of mass destruction, as it is their duty under the NPT. In March 2006, Iran strongly deplored United Kingdom's decision to renew its Trident missile nuclear weapons system. It also feels threatened by the United States military deployment in Iraq, Afghanistan and in the Middle East. Iran has pointed to the fact that the United States is the only country who has ever used nuclear weapons in history and has not ruled out the possibility to use them again in the future as part of the Bush doctrine, and against the UN Charter.

Double standard: Iran has said that the double standard applied to Israel is unjust and disturbing given its possession of nuclear weapons, its non-adherence to the NPT, and its treatment of the Palestinians over many years. Israel has unofficially stated it needs to have nuclear weapons to assure its survival in a predominantly hostile Middle East environment, since its independence in 1948 and following the Holocaust. Iran has responded that the Middle East should not bear responsibility for crimes against humanity and atrocities committed by the Nazis during World War II against the Jews in Europe.

== Bushehr nuclear power plant ==
Nuclear fuel: In 1995, Russia signed a contract to supply a light water reactor for the plant (the contract is believed to be valued between $700,000,000 and US$1,200,000,000). Although the agreement calls for the spent fuel rods to be sent back to Russia for reprocessing, the US has expressed concern that Iran would reprocess the rods itself, in order to obtain plutonium for atomic bombs. In March 2007, following Iran's refusal to halt enrichment, Russia announced it will withhold the delivery of nuclear fuel, pretexting overdue payments vis-à-vis the Bushehr reactor even though Iran has denied any late payment. Consequently, Bushehr should be commissioned by early 2009, after five delays of two years each.

Air defense system: Russia has declared repeatedly its opposition to any military attack against Iran's civilian nuclear facilities. In January 2007, Russia announced the sale of 29 units of its Tor Missile System to Iran as part of a one billion dollar deal to protect its installations.

== Justification for the programme ==
Economic reasons: Iran has stated that its programme is motivated by economic needs and scientific progress only. Iran has said its large petroleum reserves will inevitably extinguish, given its increasing domestic energy consumption and because of its oil exports. Iran has referred to U.S. government reports from the time of the Shah and independent U.S. estimates as recent as 2006 to justify its position. Iran has also referred to Russia's recent decision to withhold fuel delivery for its nuclear power plant as an additional reason why it cannot rely on other countries for its nuclear fuel needs.

Financial investment: Iran has said it has spent too much money - over ten billion U.S. dollars in the past 30 years - on its civilian nuclear programme to give it up now. Furthermore, it has argued that suspension is a way for the West to undermine Iran's independence and progress. If its rights are not respected by the Security Council, Iran has threatened to withdraw from the Non-Proliferation Treaty. Iran has justified its uranium enrichment programme because it has plans to construct more nuclear power plants in the future.

National pride and independence: In March 2007, it was announced that Iran would issue a 50,000 rial banknote with the subject being the Iranian nuclear energy programme, which has become an object of national pride and the symbol of independence for many Iranians.

== United States–Iran relations ==
Iranian concerns: Other subjects interfere with Iran's international file at the Security Council, including:

- the economic and industrial war conducted by the United States on Iran for many years, through economic sanctions,
- the freezing of Iran's assets held abroad since the Iranian Revolution in 1979, amounting to over $10 billion according to some estimates,
- US meddling in its domestic affairs, especially in the field of human rights,
- CIA Operation Ajax to overthrow democratically elected Prime Minister Mohammad Mossadegh in the 1950s, for which the U.S. government apologized in 2000.

Propaganda: Both parties have resorted to propaganda, psychological war, ideology and defamation through the media to galvanize their troops and win the public opinion. Iran has labeled the United States the "Great Satan" and chants "Death to America." Meanwhile, U.S. President George W. Bush declared Iran part of the "axis of evil." Iran and the United States accuse each other of not working for the benefit of their own people but for a small group holding to power, even if both parties claim a broad democratic support for their endeavor. A BBC poll conducted in June 2006 found that the world public opinion considered the United States, along with Iran, to be the greatest threats to world peace.

Proxy wars: The United States has accused Iran of undermining peace in the Middle East by supporting economically and militarily warring parties beyond its borders, especially:

- in Iraq by supporting sectarian violence and the insurgents,
- in Lebanon through Hezbollah,
- in the Palestinian territories through Hamas.

Iran accuses the United States to be an "occupier" in Iraq. Nevertheless, Iran has denied any military involvement in Iraq, even though American forces have said they have proof of it. On 25 December 2006, US armed forces arrested and later released four senior Iranian military officials in Baghdad. In January 2007, US controlled forces kidnapped and allegedly tortured five Iranians in Irbil, Iraq, which have not been released yet. In April 2007, those same prisoners were allowed visits by ICRC delegates for the first time. Iran has accused the United States of supporting armed opposition groups against its Government inside and outside of Iran, and conducting UAV reconnaissance flights over Iran since 2005.

Iranian Oil Bourse: According to some experts, Iran is seeking to weaken U.S. global influence by creating an Iranian oil bourse that will trade in Iranian rial and major currencies instead of United States dollars, as well as a gas cartel with Russia, which both have the greatest proven gas reserves in the world. Iran has denied this and has justified both projects based on their sole economic merits.

== Iran–Israel relations ==
Iranian threats: Iran has denied it wants to see "Israel wiped off the map" as reported by the foreign media. Iran's foreign minister has affirmed that Iran's stated policy on Israel is to urge a one-state solution through a countrywide referendum in which a government would be elected that all Palestinians and all Israelis would jointly vote for. This would normally be an end to the "Zionist state", similarly to the end of the Soviet Union.

Israeli threats: Iran has referred to Israel's Defense Forces surprise attack in 1981 against the Osirak nuclear reactor in Iraq and its recent threats against Tehran as additional reasons why it cannot disclose more information about its programme to the IAEA. Israel has stated that "a nuclear armed Iran is not acceptable for Israel" and that it will take military action if the international community fails to curb the Iranian nuclear program. If attacked, Iran has vowed its readiness to retaliate in asymmetric warfare and by using its vast arsenal of missile forces to reach Tel Aviv.

== Iran's proposed solution ==
Comprehensive negotiations: Iran has agreed to hold further talks, without the precondition to halt its uranium enrichment programme. The United States has opposed this, even though it has agreed to hold direct talks relating to other subjects like the war in Iraq. In 2003, Iran was known to have made a similar confidential proposal to the United States through the Swiss Embassy in Tehran. Switzerland is the US protecting power in Iran since the Iranian Revolution in 1979. The United States is said to have rejected those discussions, at that time.

International consortium: Iran is ready to consider the creation of an international consortium for uranium enrichment based in Iran as a solution to the current standoff at the Security Council. In April 2007, Iran declared it had reached the early stage in industrial nuclear fuel production following the installation of more than a thousand centrifuges at the Natanz underground facility. Iran has declared it was planning to install 50,000 more centrifuges in the future. In 2005, Iran inaugurated a uranium conversion facility in Isfahan, and a heavy water production plant in Arak in 2006. All declared Iranian installations are under the strict supervision of the IAEA.

== Related resolutions ==
- United Nations Security Council Resolution 1696, demanding Iran halts its enrichment programme, 31 July 2006 (Wikisource)
- United Nations Security Council Resolution 1737, imposing initial sanctions, 23 December 2006 (Wikisource)
- United Nations Security Council Resolution 1803, requiring Iran to halt enrichment-related activities, 3 March 2008
- United Nations Security Council Resolution 1835, reaffirming previous resolutions, 27 September 2008
- United Nations Security Council Resolution 1929, imposing sanctions and enforcement measures, 9 June 2010
- United Nations Security Council Resolution 2231, endorsing the Joint Comprehensive Plan of Action, 20 July 2015

== Termination ==
The provisions of Resolution 1747 were terminated by United Nations Security Council Resolution 2231 effective on Implementation Day of the Joint Comprehensive Plan of Action, 16 January 2016.

== See also ==
- Atomic Energy Organization of Iran
- Iran's missile forces
- List of United Nations Security Council Resolutions 1701 to 1800 (2006–2008)
- Nuclear programme of Iran
- Sanctions against Iran
- United States–Iran relations
