= United Nations Security Council Resolution 1696 =

UN Security Council Resolution 1696
- Iran
- Date: 31 July 2006
- Meeting no.: 5,500
- Code: S/RES/1696 (Document)
- Subject: The situation concerning Iran; Non-proliferation
- Voting summary: 14 voted for; 1 voted against; None abstained
- Result: Adopted

Security Council composition
- Permanent members: China; France; Russia; United Kingdom; United States
- Non-permanent members: Argentina; Rep. of the Congo; Denmark; Ghana; Greece; Japan; Peru; Qatar; Slovakia; Tanzania

United Nations Security Council Resolution 1696, adopted on July 31, 2006, after expressing concern at the intentions of the nuclear programme of Iran, the Council demanded that Iran halt its uranium enrichment programme.

Resolution 1696 was adopted by 14 votes in favour to one against (Qatar) and no abstentions. Qatar said that while it agreed with the demands of the resolution, it was not the right timing as the "region was in flames".

== Background ==
The International Atomic Energy Agency (IAEA) Board of Governors concluded in September 2005 that Iran had not complied with its safeguards agreement and that its nuclear program raised questions within the competence of the Security Council. In February 2006, the IAEA Board reported those conclusions to the Security Council, after it determined that Iran had not provided sufficient clarification of its nuclear intentions.

== Resolution ==
=== Observations ===
In the preamble of the resolution, the Security Council reaffirmed the provisions of the Nuclear Non-Proliferation Treaty and the right of states to the peaceful use of nuclear energy. It was "seriously concerned" that the IAEA was unable to clarify the intentions of the nuclear programme, and whether there were any undeclared activities or materials within Iran. Iran had also not taken steps required of it by the IAEA, according to the reports of its Director-General, Mohamed ElBaradei.

The text underlined the need for a political and diplomatic resolution to the situation, while expressing the proliferation risks presented by the Iranian nuclear programme and members of the Council not willing to aggravate the issue.

=== Acts ===
Acting under Chapter VII of the United Nations Charter, the Council called upon Iran to follow through with the requirements of the IAEA which would build confidence and resolve outstanding questions. It demanded that Iran suspend all enrichment-related and reprocessing activities, which would be verified by the IAEA. The resolution stated that compliance with the requirements of the IAEA would contribute to a diplomatic solution guaranteeing that Iran's nuclear programme is exclusively for peaceful purposes. Furthermore, the proposals of China, France, Germany, Russia, the United Kingdom and United States for a long-term comprehensive solution were endorsed.

The resolution urged all states to "exercise vigilance" and prohibit the transfer of any materials that could contribute to Iran's nuclear and ballistic missile programmes. It also reinforced the authority of the IAEA in its work to clarify outstanding issues relating to Iran. The Security Council expected a report from the IAEA on whether Iran had complied with its requests by August 31, 2006; legally binding "appropriate measures" would be adopted if the council was satisfied that Iran had not met its obligations under the current Resolution 1696 in order to persuade it to co-operate with the IAEA.

== Aftermath ==
The day after the resolution was passed, the Iranian president, Mahmoud Ahmadinejad, said he would not bow to "the language of force and threats".

Iran's failure to respond satisfactorily led to Resolution 1737 on December 23, 2006, in which sanctions were applied. Those sanctions were subsequently stepped up by resolutions 1747 (2007) and 1929 (2010).

== Suspension ==
The provisions of Resolution 1696 were terminated by United Nations Security Council Resolution 2231 effective on Implementation Day of the Joint Comprehensive Plan of Action, 16 January 2016, subject to the continued implementation of the JCPOA by member states.

== Reinstatement ==
The dispute resolution mechanism envisioned by UNSCR 2231 allows for the restoration of the terminated resolutions (aka snap back) including UNSCR 1696 in the event of significant non-compliance by Iran with its nuclear obligations.

page 20 of UNSCR 2231:

... Upon receipt of the notification from the complaining participant, as described

above, including a description of the good-faith efforts the participant made to exhaust the dispute resolution process specified in this JCPOA, the UN Security Council, in accordance with its procedures, shall vote on a resolution to continue the sanctions lifting. If the resolution described above has not been adopted within 30 days of the notification, then the provisions of the old UN Security Council resolutions would be re-imposed, unless the UN Security

Council decides otherwise ...

== Snap Back Controversy ==
On August 20, 2020, US secretary of state, Mike Pompeo, notified the UN Security Council of significant Iranian non-compliance of the JCPOA, officially requesting all prior sanctions to be reinstated. The move was highly controversial as other council members did not recognize the US as participant in the JCPOA since the 2018 American withdrawal of the deal, thus unable to use its dispute resolution mechanism to re-impose international sanctions. The US position however, is that UNSCR 2231 forever names US as a participant for the purpose and that there is no mechanism for it to be removed. Iranian non-complicance with the deal is thus enough to bring back the international sanctions that were lifted in return for Iran accepting limits on its nuclear programme.

== See also ==
- Iran and weapons of mass destruction
- List of United Nations Security Council Resolutions 1601 to 1700 (2005–2006)
- Nuclear programme of Iran
