= United Nations Security Council Resolution 1737 =

UN Security Council Resolution 1737
- Iran
- Date: 23 December 2006
- Meeting no.: 5,612
- Code: S/RES/1737 (Document)
- Subject: The situation concerning Iran; Non-proliferation
- Voting summary: 15 voted for; None voted against; None abstained
- Result: Adopted

Security Council composition
- Permanent members: China; France; Russia; United Kingdom; United States
- Non-permanent members: Argentina; Rep. of the Congo; Denmark; Ghana; Greece; Japan; Peru; Qatar; Slovakia; Tanzania

United Nations Security Council Resolution 1737 was unanimously passed by the United Nations Security Council on 23 December 2006.

The resolution, sponsored by France, Germany and the United Kingdom, imposed sanctions against Iran for failing to stop its uranium enrichment program following resolution 1696. It banned the supply of nuclear-related technology and materials and froze the assets of key individuals and companies related to the enrichment program. It took place two months after the creation of a draft-resolution, which was amended several times after objections from Russia and China. These objections were evident, as it took a last minute call from Russian President Vladimir Putin to U.S. President George W. Bush to finalise the vote. The resolution came after Iran rejected economic incentives put forward by the permanent five members of the Security Council plus Germany for Iran to halt its nuclear enrichment programme.

== Summary of resolution ==
The resolution, enacted under Chapter VII of the United Nations Charter, requires Iran to suspend certain "proliferation-sensitive nuclear activities." It places several prohibitions on all states with regards to Iran's nuclear activities. The Security Council also imposed a freeze on those assets supporting or associated with Iran's proliferation nuclear activities and established a committee (known as the 1737 Committee) to oversee their implementation. It also provided a deadline for Iran to comply with the resolution. The sanctions would be lifted if Iran suspended the "suspect activities" within 60 days to the satisfaction of the International Atomic Energy Agency.

== Iranian response ==
Iran responded by condemning the resolution and criticizing the Security Council. Mohammad Ali Hosseini, a spokesman for Iran's Foreign Ministry, said the resolution "cannot affect or limit Iran's peaceful nuclear activities but will discredit the decisions of the Security Council, whose power is deteriorating." Because the resolution is under Article 41 of Chapter 7 of the United Nations Charter, it cannot be enforced through the use of military means. The Iranian Ambassador to the U.N, M. Javad Zarif, also replied to the resolution, “A nation is being punished for exercising its inalienable rights,” accusing the council of acting at the “behest of a dangerous regime with aggression and war crimes as its signature brand of behaviour,” referring to Israel, whose Prime Minister, Ehud Olmert, allegedly took steps towards the disambiguation of Israel's suspected nuclear arsenal.

In reaction to the resolution, Iranian President Mahmoud Ahmadinejad stated "I am sorry for you who lost the opportunity for friendship with the nation of Iran. You yourself know that you cannot damage the nation of Iran an iota." Hosseini, the foreign ministry spokesman, vowed that Iran's relationship with the UN nuclear watchdog would change.

== List of individuals and entities with frozen assets ==
The resolution lists the following individuals and organizations in an annex, as the initial list of people and organizations whose assets are asked to be frozen:

=== Nuclear program ===
Organizations

- Atomic Energy Organization of Iran
- Mesbah Energy Company
- Kala-Electric
- Pars Trash Company
- Farayand Technique
- Defense Industries Organization
- 7th of Tir

Individuals

- Mohammad Qannadi, AEOI Vice President for Research & Development
- Behman Asgarpour, Operational Manager ( Arak)
- Dawood Agha-Jani, Head of the PFEP (Natanz)
- Ehsan Monajemi, Construction Project Manager, Natanz
- Jafar Mohammadi, Technical Adviser to the AEOI (in charge of managing the production of valves for centrifuges)
- Ali Hajinia Leilabadi, Director General of Mesbah Energy Company
- Lt Gen Mohammad Mehdi Nejad Nouri, Rector of Malek Ashtar University of Defence Technology

=== Ballistic missile program ===
Organizations

- Shahid Hemmat Industrial Group
- Shahid Bagheri Industrial Group
- Fajr Industrial Group

Individuals

- Gen Hosein Salimi, Commander of the Air Force, IRGC (Pasdaran)
- Ahmad Vahid Dastjerdi, Head of the AIO
- Reza-Gholi Esmaeli, Head of Trade & International Affairs Dept, AIO
- Bahmanyar Morteza Bahmanyar, Head of Finance & Budget Dept, AIO

In addition to the above, Major General Yahya Rahim Safavi, Commander in Chief of the Islamic Revolutionary Guard Corps, is listed in a separate group and is claimed to be involved in both the nuclear and ballistic missile programs.

== Russian missile sale ==
After the resolution was passed, Russia sold an unspecified number of surface-to-air missiles of the Tor-M1 type to Iran.

== Implementation ==
In September 2012, Bahrain and the United Arab Emirates confiscated various equipment headed to Iran which may have been sought for the Iranian nuclear program, including carbon fibre, which experts said would be vital if Iran wanted to develop more advanced nuclear enrichment centrifuge technology. In addition, diplomats said that the UAE reported to the 1737 Committee that the UAE had intercepted suspicious equipment headed to Iran about 15 times in three years.

== Termination ==
The provisions of Resolution 1737 were terminated by United Nations Security Council Resolution 2231 effective on Implementation Day of the Joint Comprehensive Plan of Action, 16 January 2016.

== See also ==
- Iran and weapons of mass destruction
- List of United Nations Security Council Resolutions 1701 to 1800 (2006–2008)
- Nuclear programme of Iran
- United Nations Security Council Resolution 1747
