= United Nations Security Council Resolution 1803 =

UN Security Council Resolution 1803
- Iran
- Date: 3 March 2008
- Code: S/RES/1803 (Document)
- Subject: Non-proliferation; Iran
- Voting summary: 14 voted for; None voted against; 1 abstained
- Result: Adopted

Security Council composition
- Permanent members: China; France; Russia; United Kingdom; United States
- Non-permanent members: Burkina Faso; Belgium; Costa Rica; Croatia; Indonesia; Italy; Libya; Panama; South Africa; Vietnam

UN Security Council Resolution 1803 was adopted on March 3, 2008, by a vote of 14–0–1, with Indonesia as the only abstention. The Security Council of the United Nations, acting pursuant to Article 41 of Chapter VII of the UN Charter, required Iran to cease and desist from any uranium enrichment. It also required Iran to stop research and development associated with centrifuges and uranium enrichment.

== Termination ==
The provisions of Resolution 1803 were terminated by United Nations Security Council Resolution 2231 effective on Implementation Day of the Joint Comprehensive Plan of Action, 16 January 2016.

== See also ==
- International sanctions against Iran
- Current international tensions with Iran
