= Kamal Kharazi =

Iranian politician and foreign minister of Iran (1944–2026)

Seyyed Kamal Kharazi
- کمال خرازی
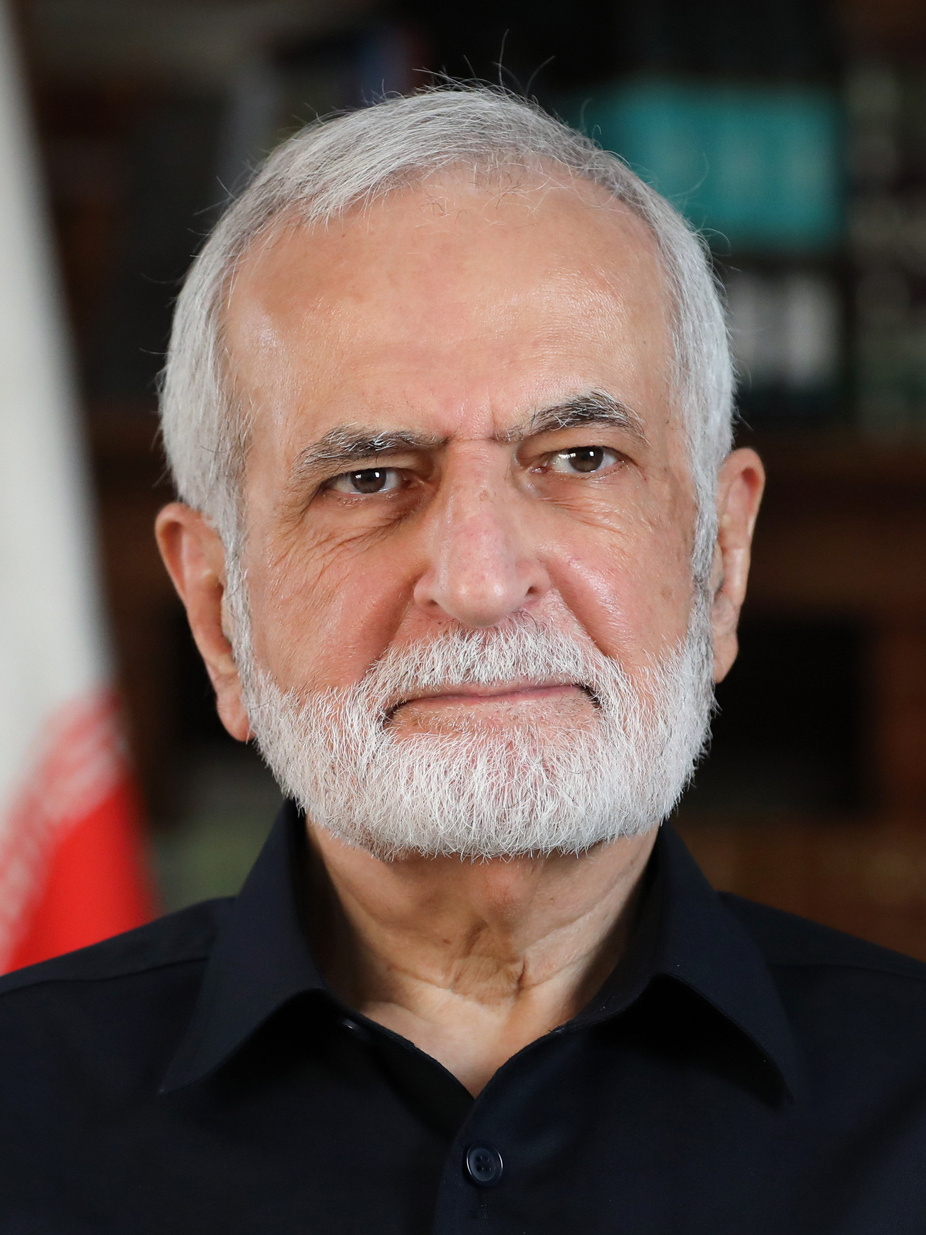
- Kharazi in 2025

Member of Expediency Discernment Council
- In office 20 September 2022 – 9 April 2026
- Appointed by: Ali Khamenei
- Chairman: Sadiq Larijani

Minister of Foreign Affairs of Iran
- In office 20 August 1997 – 24 August 2005
- President: Mohammad Khatami
- Preceded by: Ali Akbar Velayati
- Succeeded by: Manouchehr Mottaki

Ambassador of Iran to the United Nations
- In office 12 April 1989 – 30 August 1997
- President: Akbar Hashemi Rafsanjani
- Preceded by: Mohammad Jafar Mahallati
- Succeeded by: Mohammad Hadi Nejad Hosseinian

Personal details
- Born: Ali Naghi Kharazi; 1 December 1944 Tehran, Iran
- Died: 9 April 2026 (aged 81) Tehran, Iran
- Cause of death: Assassination by airstrike
- Education: University of Tehran; University of Houston

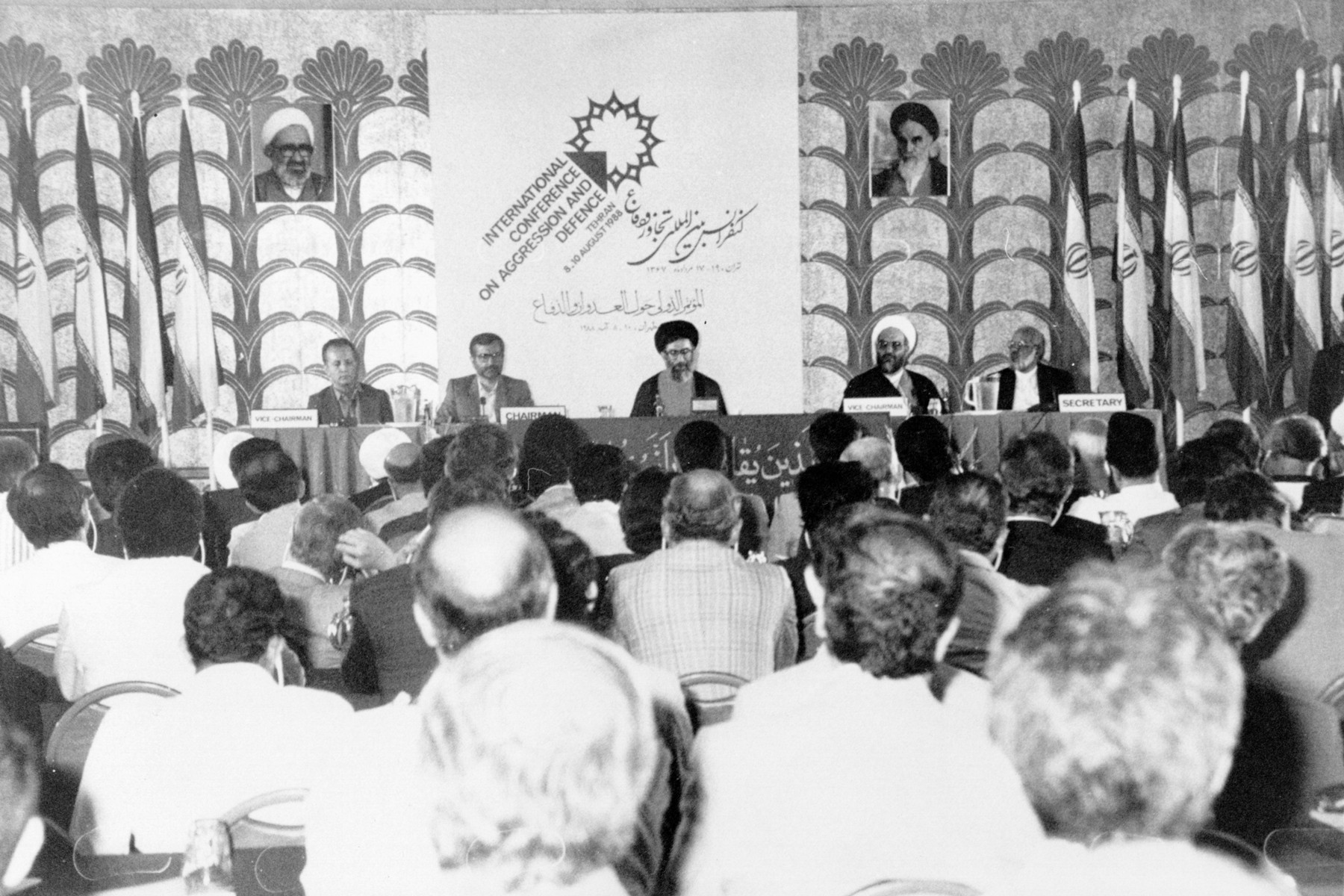
International Conference on Aggression and Defense in Tehran 7–9 August 1988 - 180 scholars from 21 countries presented their research on the Iran-Iraq War

Sayyid Kamal Kharazi (Persian: کمال خرازی, 1 December 1944 – 9 April 2026) was an Iranian reformist politician and diplomat who served as the foreign minister of Iran from 20 August 1997 to 24 August 2005.

Kharazi was succeeded as foreign minister by Manouchehr Mottaki following Mahmoud Ahmadinejad's election. He later served as an advisor to Supreme Leader Ayatollah Ali Khamenei, was a member of the Expediency Discernment Council, chaired the Strategic Council on Foreign Relations, and co-founded the Institute for Cognitive Science Studies in 2016. He died on 9 April 2026 from wounds sustained in an airstrike during the 2026 Iran war.

== Early life and education ==
Kharazi was born in Tehran in 1944. He gained a BA in Arabic studies followed by a MEd from the University of Tehran. From 1975-76, he was a teaching fellow at the University of Houston, which awarded him a PhD in industrial psychology.

== Career ==
Kharazi was a Professor of Management and Educational Psychology at Tehran University starting in 1983. Kharazi was a founding member of the Islamic Research Institute in London.

He held a number of governmental, diplomatic, and academic posts and headed Iranian delegations at numerous international conferences, most importantly at the Earth Summit held in Rio de Janeiro in 1992. For several years Kharazi presented the official Iranian position on TV and at university campuses in the United States and Europe and wrote extensively on foreign policy issues. He had extensive experience in guiding the media during the early days of the Iranian Revolution.

From July 1980 to September 1989, he was the President of the Islamic Republic News Agency. On 18 September 1980, the Iran–Iraq War broke out, and Kharazi served as a member of the Supreme Defense Council of Iran and headed the War Information Headquarter. He served as a military spokesman for most of the war (from September 1980 to September 1988).

During the first months after the Iranian Revolution, Kharazi served as the Vice-President of Iranian National Television (March to August 1979) for the new Islamic state. He then served as the Vice-Minister for Political Affairs of the Ministry of Foreign Affairs (from August 1979 to March 1980) and as the Managing Director of the Center for Intellectual Development of Children and Young Adults (from August 1979 to July 1981). Previously, he represented Iran at the United Nations from 1989 to 1997.

In 2006, Iran's Supreme Leader, Ali Khamenei, created the Foreign Relations Steering Council and appointed Kharazi as Chairman.

In 2015, Kharazi was condemned for questioning Bahrain’s Arab identity, statements that were considered disrespectful by members of Bahrain’s Council of Representatives and Foreign Affairs Committee, who stated his remarks were a violation of international law.

In May 2023, Kharazi was the opening speaker at an Iranian-Arab dialogue conference in Doha, Qatar.

== Personal life ==
Kharazi was married with two children. In April 2026 his wife was killed in the same airstrike that fatally wounded him. His nephew, Sadegh Kharazi, is Iran's ambassador to Paris and played a key role in developing the so-called roadmap or 'Swiss memo'.

== Assassination ==
On 1 April 2026, Iranian outlet Nournews reported that Kharazi had been seriously injured and his wife killed in a targeted U.S.-Israeli airstrike that hit his home in Tehran during the 2026 Iran war. On 9 April, Iranian media reported that he had died of his wounds at the age of 81.

== Published works ==
Kharazi wrote and translated a number of textbooks and articles on education and management.

== See also ==
- Mohsen Kharrazi
- List of Iranian officials killed during the 2026 Iran war
- Ministry of Foreign Affairs of Iran

Media offices
Preceded by None	Deputy Head of IRIB; 1979	Succeeded by Ali Jannati
Preceded by Nohammad-Reza Sharif	Managing-Director of IRNA; 1980–1989	Succeeded by Hossein Nasiri
Diplomatic posts
Preceded by Mohammad Jafar Mahallati	Ambassador of Iran to the United Nations; 1989–1997	Succeeded by Mohammad Hadi Nejad Hosseinian
Political offices
Preceded by Ali Akbar Velayati	Minister of Foreign Affairs; 1997–2005	Succeeded by Manouchehr Mottaki
