= ICSS =

ICSS may refer to:

- Institute for Cognitive Science Studies
- Intracranial Self-Stimulation
- Integrated Control and Safety Systems
- Interdisciplinary Social Science Research Center, Zhejiang University
- International Centre for Sport Security
- International Climate Space Station
