= Majid Takht-Ravanchi =

Iranian diplomat

- مجید تخت‌روانچی
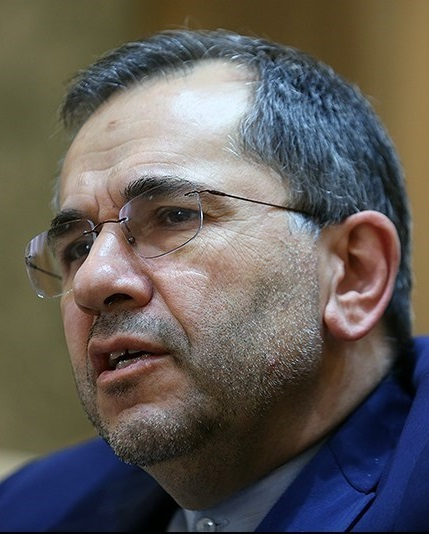
- Takht-Ravanchi in 2018

Ambassador of Iran to the United Nations
- In office 24 April 2019 – 7 September 2022
- President: Hassan Rouhani; Ebrahim Raisi
- Preceded by: Gholam-Ali Khoshroo
- Succeeded by: Amir-Saeid Iravani

Ambassador of Iran to the Switzerland and Lichtenstein
- In office 2002–2006
- President: Mohammad Khatami; Mahmoud Ahmadinejad

Personal details
- Born: 15 October 1958 (age 67) Tehran, Iran
- Education: University of Kansas; Fordham University; University of Bern
- Awards: Order of Merit and Management (2nd class)

Majid Takht-Ravanchi (also Takht-e-Ravanchi, Persian: ‌مجید تخت‌روانچی, born 15 October 1958, in Tehran) is an Iranian diplomat who is currently political deputy at the Ministry of Foreign Affairs of Iran since September 2024. He served as the Ambassador of Iran to the United Nations from 2019 to 2022.

== Education ==
Takht-Ravanchi holds a BS and MS from the University of Kansas in civil engineering, an MA from Fordham University in international political economy and development, and a PhD from the University of Bern in political science.

== Negotiations ==
Takht-Ravanchi is a negotiator who accompanied Javad Zarif in a series of negotiations with the P5+1 (the United States, the United Kingdom, France, China and Russia plus Germany) prior to the conclusion of the 2015 JCPOA between Iran and the United States. He also participated in the 2025 Iran–United States negotiations at the expert level.

Political offices
Preceded by Hamid Aboutalebi	Deputy Chief of Staff of the President for Political Affairs; 13 November 2017–8 April 2019	Succeeded by Fereydoun Verdinejad
Diplomatic posts
Preceded by Ali Asghar Khaji	Under Secretary for European and American Affairs of the Ministry of Foreign Affairs of Iran; 4 September 2013–13 November 2017	Succeeded by Office abolished
