= Iranian Non-Aggression Initiative =

The Iranian Non-Aggression Initiative was a diplomatic proposal introduced by Mohammad Javad Zarif and the Iranian government in 2019 with the aim of reducing military and security tensions in the Persian Gulf region amid escalating confrontation between Iran on one side and the United States, Israel, and the Arab Gulf states on the other, following the American withdrawal from the Iranian nuclear agreement. The initiative later evolved into a broader project known as the Hormuz Peace Endeavor (HOPE).
