= Permanent Representative of Iran to the United Nations =

Leader of the delegation of Iran to the United Nations

Ambassador to the United Nations of the Islamic Republic of Iran
- Flag of the United Nations
- Incumbent; Amir-Saeid Iravani since 7 September 2022
- Appointer: President of Iran
- Inaugural holder: Nasrollah Entezam
- Formation: 1945
- Website: Website of The Permanent Mission of the Islamic Republic of Iran to the United Nations - New York at the Wayback Machine (archived August 16, 2017). Additional archives: Website of The Permanent Mission of the Islamic Republic of Iran to the United Nations - New York.

The Ambassador of Iran to the United Nations is the leader of the delegation of Iran to the United Nations. The position is more formally known as the "Permanent Representative of the Islamic Republic of Iran to the United Nations”, with the rank and status of Ambassador Extraordinary and Plenipotentiary, and Representative of Iran in the United Nations Security Council.

The current ambassador is Amir-Saeid Iravani. since September 7, 2022.

== Office-holders ==
The following is a chronological list of those who have held the office:

No.	Image	Permanent Representative	Years served	Head of State of Iran	UN Secretary-General	
Imperial State of Iran (1925–1979) •
Head of delegation		Hassan Taqizadeh	1946–1947	Mohammad Reza Pahlavi	Gladwyn Jebb	
1		Nasrollah Entezam	1947–1950	Mohammad Reza Pahlavi	Trygve Lie	
2		Aligholi Ardalan	1950–1955	Mohammad Reza Pahlavi	Trygve Lie, Dag Hammarskjöld	
3		Jalal Abdoh	1955–1959	Mohammad Reza Pahlavi	Dag Hammarskjöld	
4		Mehdi Vakil	1959–1970	Mohammad Reza Pahlavi	Dag Hammarskjöld, U Thant	
5		Fereydoon Hoveyda	1970–1979	Mohammad Reza Pahlavi	U Thant, Kurt Waldheim	
Interim Government of Iran (1979) •
Chargé d'Affaires a.i.		Jamal Shemirani	1979	Mehdi Bazargan	Kurt Waldheim	
Islamic Republic of Iran (1979–present) •
6		Mansour Farhang	1979–1980	Abolhassan Banisadr	Kurt Waldheim	
Chargé d'Affaires a.i.		Jamal Shemirani	1980	Abolhassan Banisadr	Kurt Waldheim	
7		Saeed Rajaee Khorasani	1981–1987	Ali Khamenei	Kurt Waldheim, Javier Pérez de Cuéllar	
Chargé d'Affaires a.i.		Mohammad Jafar Mahallati	1987–1988	Ali Khamenei, Akbar Hashemi Rafsanjani	Javier Pérez de Cuéllar	
8		Mohammad Jafar Mahallati		Ali Khamenei, Akbar Hashemi Rafsanjani	Javier Pérez de Cuéllar	1988–1989 (Permanent representative)
9		Kamal Kharazi	1989–1997	Akbar Hashemi Rafsanjani	Javier Pérez de Cuéllar, Boutros Boutros-Ghali, Kofi Annan	
10		Mohammad Hadi Nejad Hosseinian	1997–2002	Mohammad Khatami	Kofi Annan	
11		Mohammad Javad Zarif	2002–2007	Mohammad Khatami, Mahmoud Ahmadinejad	Kofi Annan, Ban Ki-moon	
12		Mohammad Khazaee	2007–2014	Mahmoud Ahmadinejad, Hassan Rouhani	Ban Ki-moon	
Chargé d'Affaires a.i		Gholamhossein Dehghani	2014–2015	Hassan Rouhani	Ban Ki-moon	
13		Gholamali Khoshroo	2015–2018	Hassan Rouhani	Ban Ki-moon, António Guterres	
Chargé d'Affaires a.i		Es'hagh Al Habib	2018–2019	Hassan Rouhani	António Guterres	
14		Majid Takht-Ravanchi	2019–2022	Hassan Rouhani, Ebrahim Raisi	António Guterres	
15		Amir-Saeid Iravani	2022–present	Ebrahim Raisi, Masoud Pezeshkian	António Guterres	

== See also ==
- Foreign relations of Iran
- List of permanent representatives of Iran to the United Nations Office at Geneva
- List of ambassadors of Iran to United Nations Office at Vienna
