= Fifth session of the United Nations General Assembly =

- 19 September 1950 – 5 November 1951 5th session 5th general debate
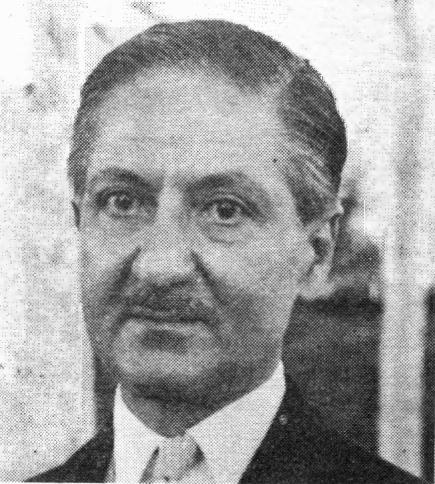
- President of the 5th General Assembly, Nasrollah Entezam
- Host country: United Nations
- Participants: United Nations Member States
- President: Nasrollah Entezam
- Secretary-General: Trygve Lie

The fifth session of the United Nations General Assembly opened on 19 September 1950 in Lake Success, New York The president was Nasrollah Entezam, previously the Permanent Representative of Iran to the United Nations.

Tensions between the USSR and the UN over Korea led to the passing of the Declaration on the Removal of the Threat of a New War and the Strengthening of Peace and Security among the Nations

The session saw the establishment of December 10 as Human Rights Day

== See also ==
- List of UN General Assembly sessions
- List of General debates of the United Nations General Assembly
