= Nasrollah Entezam =

Iranian Ambassador and politician

- نصرالله انتظام
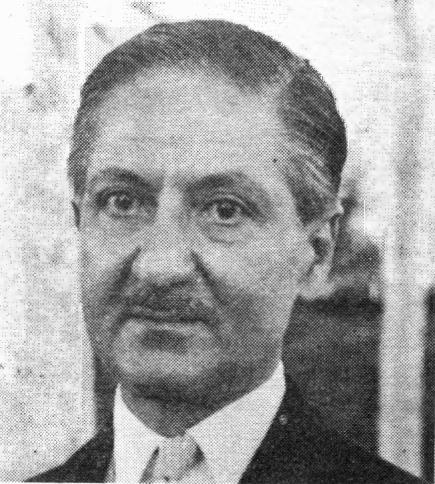
- Entezam in 1950

Iranian Ambassador to France
- In office February 1958 – February 1962

22nd Iranian Ambassador to US
- In office 22 October 1953 – January 1956
- Preceded by: Abbas Aram
- Succeeded by: Ali Amini

19th Iranian Ambassador to US
- In office 10 June 1950 – 22 September 1952
- Preceded by: Hosein Alā
- Succeeded by: Allah-Yar Saleh

Permanent Representative of Iran to the United Nations
- In office 1 April 1947 – 1 April 1950
- Preceded by: Hassan Taqizadeh
- Succeeded by: Aligholi Ardalan

President of the United Nations General Assembly
- In office 1 January 1950 – 1 January 1951
- Preceded by: Carlos P. Romulo
- Succeeded by: Luis Padilla Nervo

Personal details
- Born: 16 February 1900 Tehran, Guarded Domains of Persia
- Died: 19 December 1980 (aged 80) Tehran, Iran
- Resting place: Behesht-e Zahra
- Party: New Iran Party; Rastakhiz Party
- Relations: Abdollah Entezam (brother); Hume Horan (nephew)
- Education: University of Tehran; University of Paris
- Occupation: Ambassador; Diplomat; Politician; Minister

Nasrollah Entezam (Persian: نصرالله انتظام; also spelled Naṣr-Allāh Enteẓām; 16 February 1900 – 19 December 1980) was a diplomat, politician, and minister, as well as Iranian Ambassador to the United States and France. He was the first Iranian Ambassador to the United Nations from 1947 to 1950 and President of the UN General Assembly during its fifth session in 1950.

== Biography ==
=== Early life ===
Nasrollah Entezam was born in Tehran, Iran on 16 February 1900 into a Qajari family. His father Al-Saltanah Entezam and older brother Abdullah Entezam were also diplomats and politicians and his grandfather was the Minister of Order under Naser al-Din Shah Qajar. His mother, Khorshid Laqa Ghaffari, was descended from the Ghaffari family of Kashan. Nasrollah and his brother both studied at the German Embassy School in Tehran. Entezam then studied political science at the University of Tehran and law at the University of Paris.

=== Career ===
In 1918, following World War I, Entezam joined the Ministry of Foreign Affairs before serving as the Secretary to the Iranian Legations in Paris, Warsaw, Bern, and London between 1926 and 1929. He represented the Iranian government at the World Economic Conference in London in 1933 and was Iran's chargé d'affaires in Bern and deputy head of the Iranian delegation between 1934 and 1938. During the Anglo-Persian Oil Company dispute in 1932-1933, Entezam served as secretary to the Iranian delegation and accompanied Ali-Akbar Davar and Hossein Ala' to Geneva to present Iran's case at the League of Nations. Entezam left Bern in 1938 to return to Tehran, where he was the Director of the Political Department of the Ministry of Foreign Affairs for four years.

During the Anglo-Soviet occupation of Iran during World War II, Entezam served in a number of positions, including Minister of Public Health, Minister of Post and Telegraph, Minister of Roads, and, in 1944-1945, Minister of Foreign Affairs under Prime Minister Bayat. Following the occupation and Reza Shah's abdication in September 1941, until the appointment of Mohammad Ali Foroughi as Court Minister in March 1942, Nasrollah was "fully in charge of the court" and developed close ties with Mohammad-Reza Shah. In 1942, he was also appointed Grand Master of Ceremonies at the Imperial Palace. He continued in foreign affairs following the war by representing Iran at the San Francisco Conference in 1945, the gathering that established the United Nations, and at the first session of the General Assembly in 1946. In 1947, he became Iran's permanent representative to the UN and joined the United Nations Special Committee on Palestine, and in 1949 "served 'with distinction' as chairman of the Assembly's Special Political Committee." He also chaired a UN sub-committee about the permanent UN headquarters location and in 1949 was an initial candidate for president of the UN General Assembly. He eventually withdrew from the election in favor of Carlos P. Romulo of the Philippines "in interests of Asian unity."

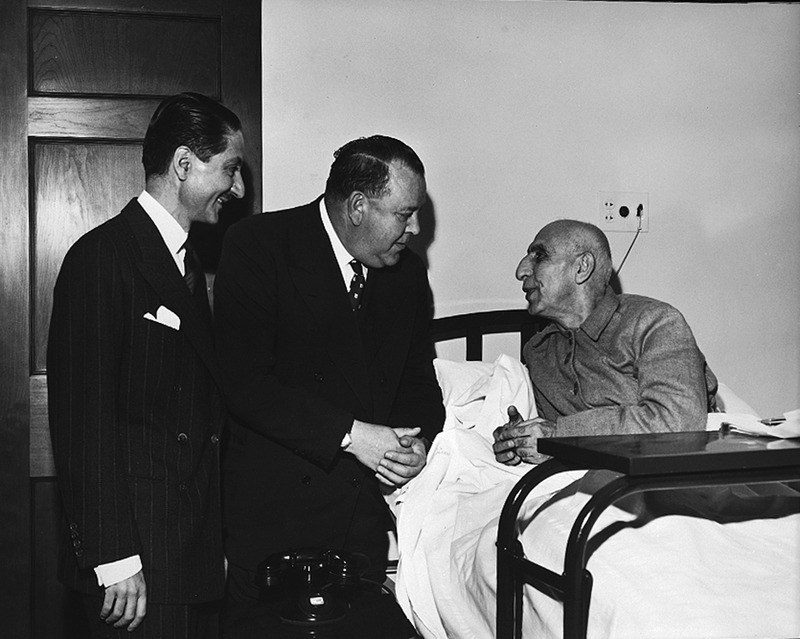
Entezam with Prime minister Mohammad Mosaddegh (right) and Trygve Lie (center)

During the third session of the General Assembly in 1948, he was chairman of the United Nations Trusteeship Council and the Special Committee on Methods and Procedures. In 1948, he was chairman of the ad hoc Political Committee and in 1950, he was a member of the Cease Fire Committee for Korea and was elected President of the Assembly. The Korean War occurred during his presidency and Entezam, wanting both economic aid from the USA and improved relations with Russia, strove to "tread a delicate path while maintaining a judicious appearance of fairness to all." The Assembly also passed the Uniting for Peace resolution during this time, and Entezam helped establish a committee to consider granting UN membership to China and passed a resolution "guaranteeing Korea's postwar freedom, unity, and independence." In 1952, he was expected to become the UN's next Secretary-General but Dag Hammarskjöld was instead elected.

Entezam was given the title Ambassador Extraordinary and Minister Plenipotentiary by the United States in 1950 for serving as a diplomat at the Embassy in the USA. He was the first non-Christian diplomat at the General Assembly in New York and served as Iran ambassador to the United States until 1952, when he was removed and replaced by Allah-Yar Saleh under Prime Minister Mohammad Mosaddegh. Entezam was instead installed at the International Court of Justice in The Hague. Following the Iran coup of August 1953, Entezam returned to his post in the USA. He then worked as the Ambassador to France from 1958 to 1962.

Following his departure from Paris, he was a minister without portfolio under Prime Minister Asadollah Alam. Following the Indo-Pakistani War in 1965, Entezam served as a member and judge on the dispute over the boundaries of the warring nations, namely the Rann of Kutch. He was later elected chairman of the Inaugural Congress of the Rastakhiz Party. According to a 1963 report by the United States Embassy, Entezam and his brother Abdollah were informally active in Prime Minister Amini's Cabinet and met every Wednesday for twelve years. Where his brother was considered to be prestigious and deserving of respect, Nasrollah was seen as a "flamboyant and sartorially elegant bachelor... [he was] also considered to be a capable official."

=== Final years and death ===
Entezam retired in the late 1960s/early 1970s but continued to serve the Shah in some capacity. His final duties were as chairman of the United States Bicentennial celebration and co-chair of the Rastakhiz Party. Several years later, following the Islamic Revolution, he returned to Iran from asthma treatment in Switzerland despite his family's pleas to stay abroad. He was immediately seized at the Mehrabad International Airport upon landing and arrested "on 'political charges'." He was held in Evin Prison, where he was tortured and later suffered a stroke, for which he was sent to the hospital. Entezam died shortly after on 19 December 1980, though sources cannot seem to agree where he passed beyond it being in Tehran: at his house, at his sister's house, in prison, or at the hospital. He is buried in Behesht-e Zahra.

Entezam's nephew, the son of his brother Abdollah, was American diplomat Hume Horan. Entezam was also a freemason.

Diplomatic posts
Preceded by Carlos P. Romulo	President of the United Nations General Assembly –1951	Succeeded by Luis Padilla Nervo
