= Carlos P. Romulo =

Filipino politician & diplomat (1899–1985)

Carlos P. Rómulo
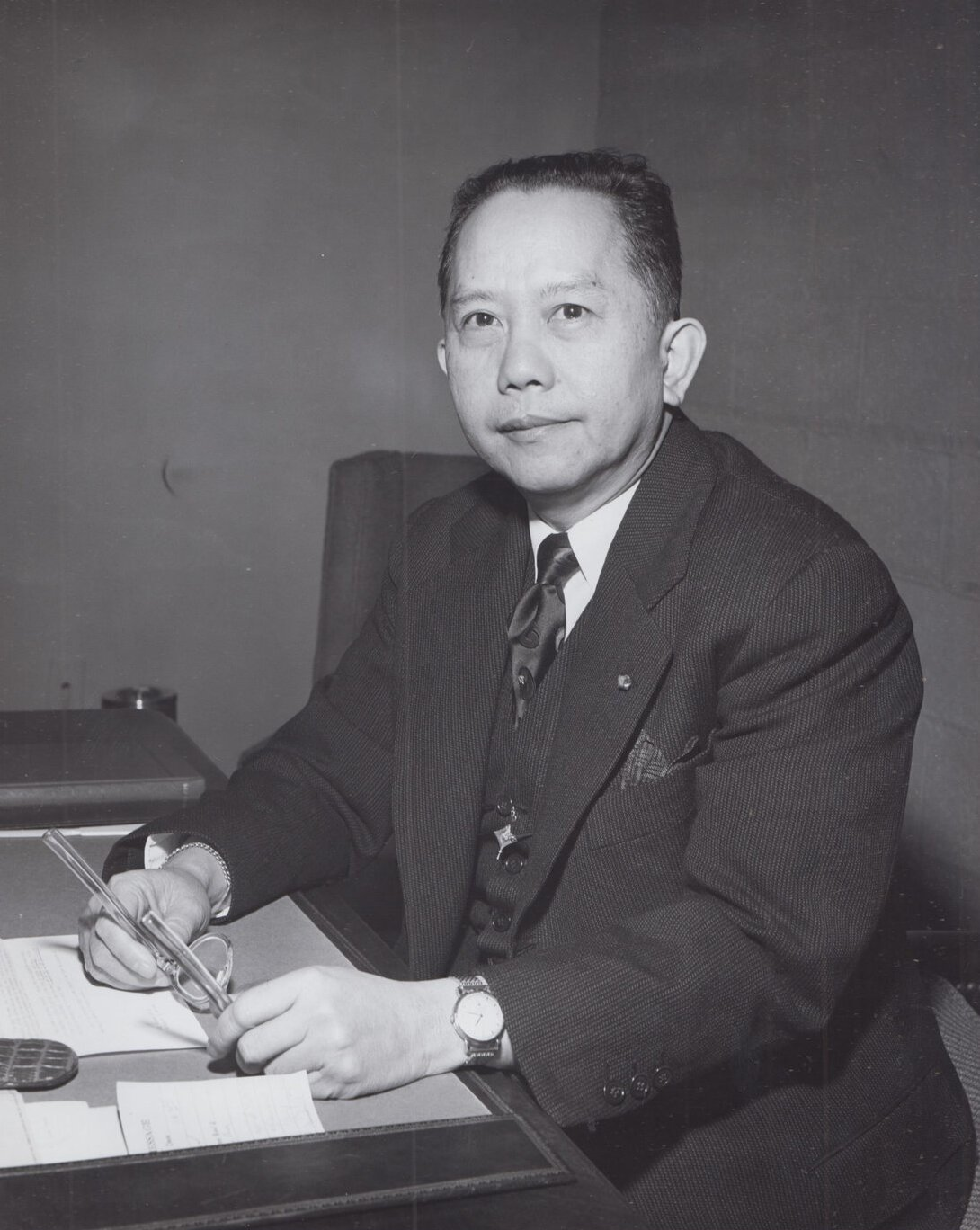
- Romulo in 1949

President of the United Nations General Assembly
- In office September 20, 1949 – June 30, 1950
- Preceded by: H. V. Evatt
- Succeeded by: Nasrollah Entezam

Secretary/Minister of Foreign Affairs
- In office November 30, 1968 – January 14, 1984
- President: Ferdinand Marcos
- Preceded by: Narciso Ramos
- Succeeded by: Manuel Collantes (Acting)
- In office May 11, 1950 – January 1952
- President: Elpidio Quirino
- Preceded by: Felino Neri
- Succeeded by: Joaquín Miguel Elizalde

36th Secretary of Instruction and Information/Education
- In office December 30, 1965 – December 16, 1967
- President: Ferdinand Marcos
- Preceded by: Alejandro Roces
- Succeeded by: Onofre Corpuz (Acting)
- In office February 27, 1945 – March 8, 1945
- President: Sergio Osmeña
- Preceded by: Sergio Osmeña
- Succeeded by: Maximo Kalaw

Ambassador of the Philippines to the United States
- In office September 1955 – February 1962
- President: Ramon Magsaysay; Carlos P. Garcia; Diosdado Macapagal
- Preceded by: Joaquín Miguel Elizalde
- Succeeded by: Emilio Abello
- In office January 1952 – May 1953
- President: Elpidio Quirino
- Preceded by: Joaquín Miguel Elizalde
- Succeeded by: Joaquín Miguel Elizalde

Resident Commissioner of the Philippines
- In office August 10, 1944 – July 4, 1946
- President: Sergio Osmeña
- Preceded by: Joaquín Miguel Elizalde
- Succeeded by: Position abolished

Secretary of Information and Public Relations
- In office October 11, 1944 – February 27, 1945
- President: Sergio Osmeña
- Preceded by: Position established
- Succeeded by: Position abolished

Member of the Interim Batasang Pambansa
- In office June 12, 1978 – September 16, 1983
- Constituency: Region IV

11th President of the University of the Philippines
- In office 1962–1968
- Preceded by: Vicente Sinco
- Succeeded by: Salvador P. Lopez

Personal details
- Born: Carlos Peña Rómulo; January 14, 1899 Intramuros, Manila, Captaincy General of the Philippines, Spanish East Indies
- Died: December 15, 1985 (aged 86) Manila, Philippines
- Resting place: Libingan ng mga Bayani; Metro Manila, Philippines
- Party: KBL (1978–1985)
- Other political affiliations: Nacionalista (before 1946; 1957–1978); Democratic (1953–1957); Liberal (1946–1953)
- Spouse(s): Virginia Llamas; Beth Day
- Relations: Alberto Romulo (nephew); Roman Romulo (grandnephew); Bernadette Romulo-Puyat (grandniece)
- Children: 4
- Education: University of the Philippines Manila; Columbia University
- Occupation: Diplomat, author, statesman, soldier
- Profession: Journalist
- Awards: See below
- Website: www.carlospromulo.org

Military service
- Allegiance: Philippines
- Branch/service: Armed Forces of the Philippines (Reserve) commissioned to United States Army
- Rank: Major General
- Battles/wars: World War II
- Carlos P. Romulo's voice Carlos P. Romulo reading the message of President Manuel L. Quezon for the Eighth Anniversary of the Philippine Commonwealth (Recorded November 13, 1943)

Carlos Peña Rómulo Sr. GCS CLH NA GCrM GCrGH KGCR (January 14, 1899 – December 15, 1985) was a Filipino diplomat, statesman, soldier, journalist and author. He was a co-founder of the Boy Scouts of the Philippines, a general in the US Army and the Philippine Army, university president, and president of the United Nations General Assembly.

He has been named as one of the Philippines's national artists in literature, and was the recipient of many other honors and honorary degrees.

Romulo believed in anti-colonialism and internationalism, and held Pro-American, anti-communist, anti-fascist, and economically and politically liberal beliefs.

== Early career ==
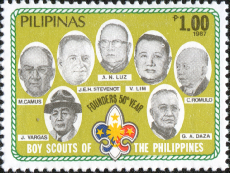
Romulo (far right) on a stamp featuring the "Founders of the Boy Scouts of the Philippines". Stamp for the National Boy Scout Movement's 50th Anniversary, October 28, 1987

Carlos Romulo was born in Intramuros, Manila on January 14, 1899. His parents were Pangasinense. His father fought against the United States in the Philippine-American War. His father transitioned to working for the U.S. government in the Philippines after the war, rising through the ranks as town councilor, mayor, and eventually the governor of Tarlac province.

He studied at the Camiling Central Elementary School during his basic education.

Romulo became a professor of English at the University of the Philippines in 1923. Simultaneously, Romulo served as the secretary to the president of the Senate of the Philippines, Manuel Quezon.

=== Publishing ===
During the 1930s, Romulo became the publisher and editor of The Philippines Herald, and one of his reporters was Yay Panlilio. On October 31, 1936, the Boy Scouts of the Philippines (BSP) was given a legislative charter under Commonwealth Act No. 111. Romulo served as one of the vice presidents of the organization.

=== World War II ===
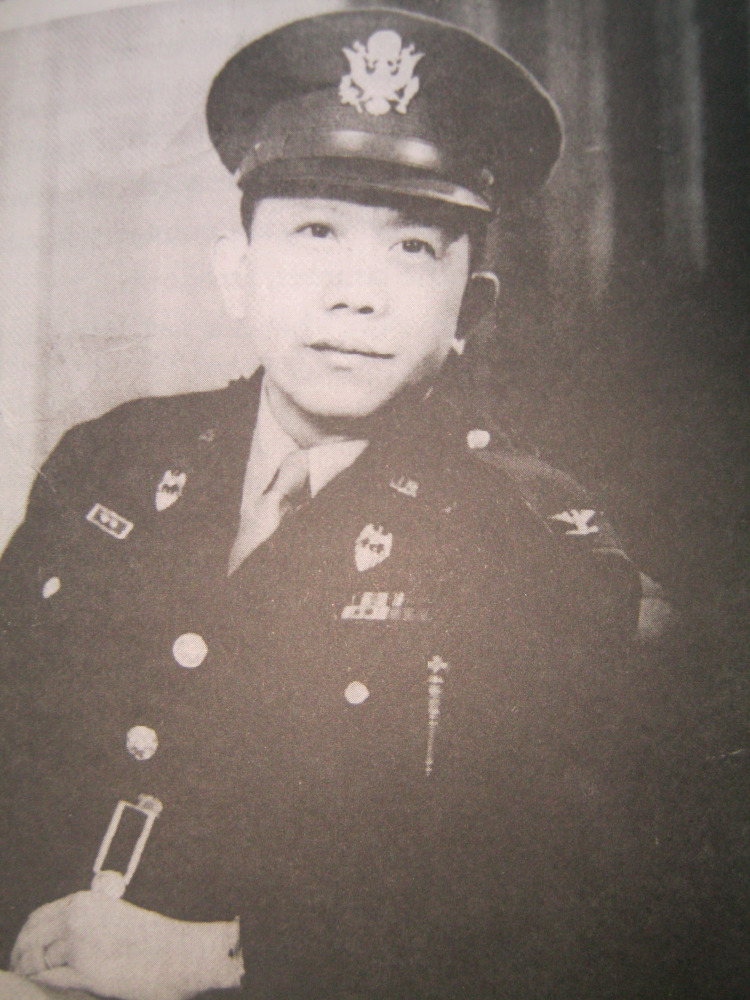
Romulo in 1942

At the start of World War II, Romulo, a major, served as an aide to General Douglas MacArthur. He was one of the last men evacuated from the Philippines before the surrender of U.S. Forces to the invading Japanese, as illness had prevented him from departing with MacArthur, finally leaving from Del Monte Airfield on Mindanao on April 25. Active in propaganda efforts, particularly through the lecture circuit, after reaching the United States, he became a member of President Quezon's War Cabinet, being appointed Secretary of Information in 1943. He reached the rank of general by the end of the war.

=== Position on independence ===
Romulo supported Philippine independence. As the United States had promised Philippine independence in the Jones Act of 1916, Romulo believed that independence was inevitable. Romulo tended to portray American imperialism in a favorable light compared to European imperialism.

== Diplomatic career ==
Romulo served eight Philippine presidents, from Manuel L. Quezon to Ferdinand Marcos, as the secretary of foreign affairs of the Philippines and as the country's representative to the United States and to the United Nations (UN). He also served as the resident commissioner to the U.S. House of Representatives during the Commonwealth era. In addition, he served also as the secretary of education in President Diosdado P. Macapagal's and President Ferdinand E. Marcos's cabinet through 1962 to 1968.

=== Resident commissioner ===
Romulo served as resident commissioner of the Philippines to the United States Congress from 1944 to 1946. This was the title of the non-voting delegate to the U.S. House of Representatives for lands taken in the Spanish–American War, and as such, he is the only member of the U.S. Congress to end his tenure via a legal secession from the union.

=== United Nations ===
In his career in the UN, Romulo was a strong advocate of human rights, freedom, and decolonization. In 1948, at the third UN General Assembly in Paris, France, he strongly disagreed with a proposal made by the Soviet delegation headed by Andrei Vishinsky, who challenged his credentials by insulting him with this quote: "You are just a little man from a little country." In return, Romulo replied, "It is the duty of the little Davids of this world to fling the pebbles of truth in the eyes of the blustering Goliaths and force them to behave!", leaving Vishinsky with nothing left to do but sit down.

=== Palestine partition plan ===
In the days preceding the UN General Assembly vote on the Partition Plan for Palestine in 1947, Romulo stated "We hold that the issue is primarily moral. The issue is whether the United Nations should accept responsibility for the enforcement of a policy which is clearly repugnant to the valid nationalist aspirations of the people of Palestine. The Philippines Government holds that the United Nations ought not to accept such responsibility." Thus, he clearly intended to oppose the partition plan, or at most abstain in the vote. However, pressure on the Philippines government from Washington led to Romulo being recalled, and was replaced by a Philippines representative who voted in favor of the partition plan.

==== President of the UN General Assembly ====
Romulo served as the president of the fourth session of UN General Assembly from 1949 to 1950—the first Asian to hold the position—and served as president of the UN Security Council four times, twice in 1957, 1980 and 1981. He had served with General MacArthur in the Pacific, and became the first non-American to win the Pulitzer Prize in Correspondence in 1942. The Pulitzer Prize website states that Carlos P. Romulo was awarded "for his observations and forecasts of Far Eastern developments during a tour of the trouble centers from Hong Kong to Batavia".

==== Campaign for secretary-general ====
Romulo ran for the office of UN secretary-general in the 1953 selection. He fell two votes short of the required seven-vote majority in the Security Council, finishing second to Lester B. Pearson of Canada. His ambitions were further dashed by negative votes from France and the Soviet Union, both of whom were permanent members with veto power. The Security Council eventually settled on a dark horse candidate and selected Dag Hammarskjöld to be UN secretary-general.

=== Ambassador to the United States ===
From January 1952 to May 1953, Romulo became the second former member of the Congress to become the ambassador to the United States from a foreign country, following Joaquín M. Elizalde, who had been his immediate predecessor in both posts. He later served as ambassador again from September 1955 to February 1962.

== Return to the Philippines ==
=== Philippine presidential elections ===
Romulo returned to the Philippines and was a candidate for the nomination as the presidential candidate for the Liberal Party, but lost at the party convention to the incumbent president, Elpidio Quirino. Quirino had agreed to a secret ballot at the convention, but after the convention opened, he demanded an open roll-call voting, leaving the delegates no choice but to support Quirino, the candidate of the party machine. Feeling betrayed, Romulo left the Liberal Party and became national campaign manager of Ramon Magsaysay, the candidate of the opposing Nacionalista Party, who won the election in 1953.

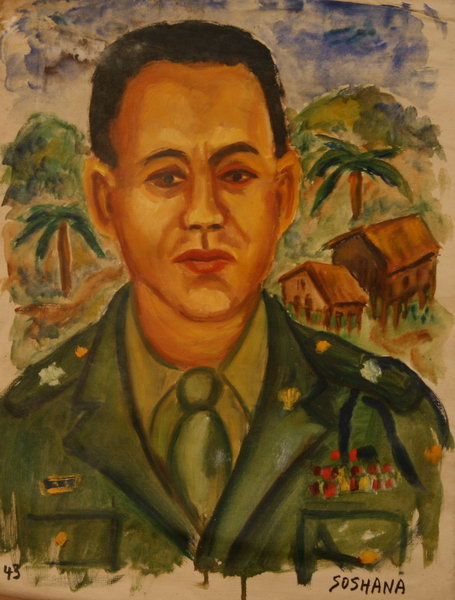
Romulo, portrait by Soshana, oil on canvas, 1945

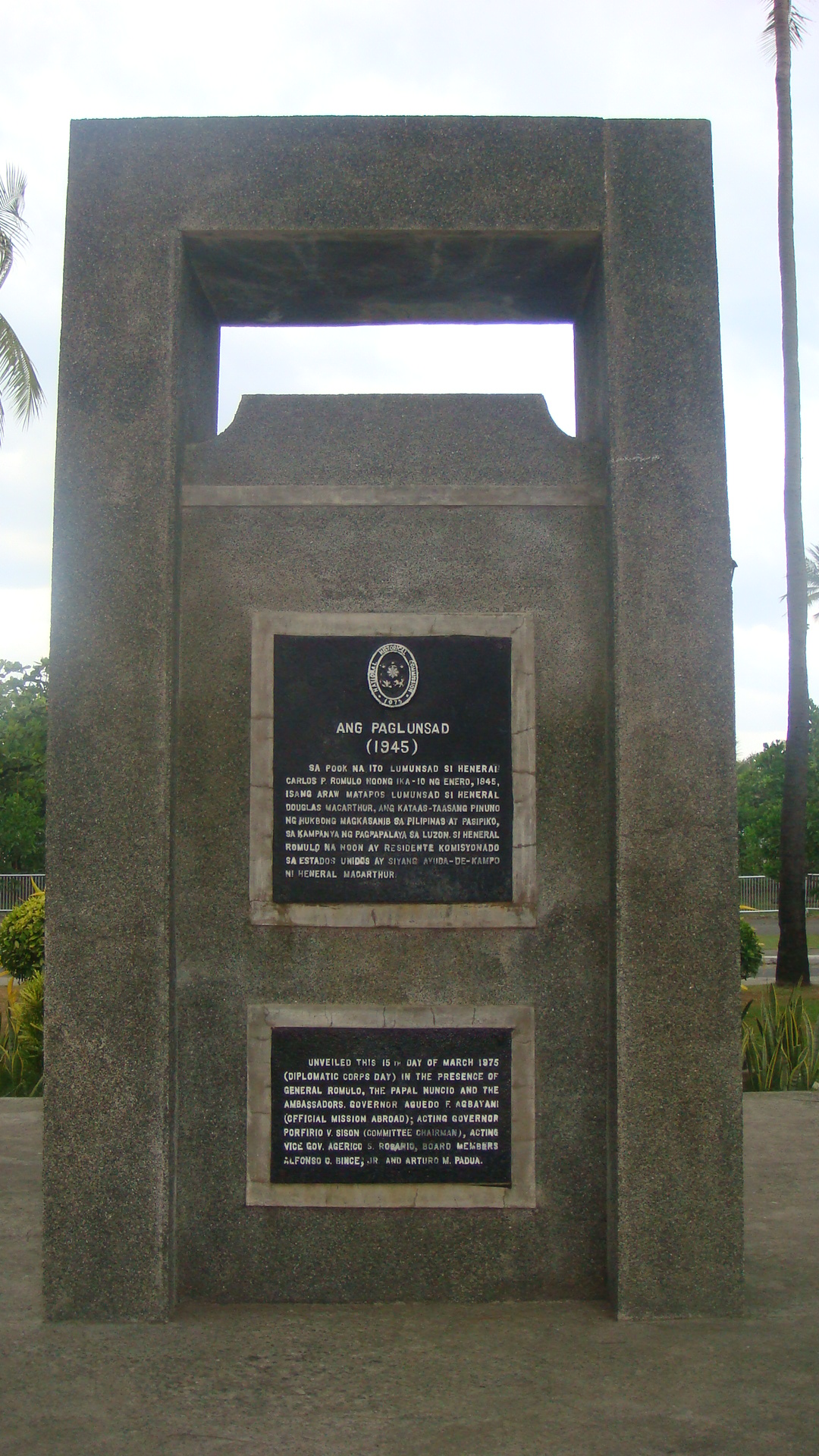
Ang Paglunsad Memorial, Lingayen, Pangasinan. Carlos P. Romulo launched on January 10, 1945, Philippine and Pacific troops to liberate Luzon

=== Minister of Foreign Affairs ===
Romulo served as the Philippines' secretary (minister from 1973 to 1984) of foreign affairs under President Elpidio Quirino from 1950 to 1952, under President Diosdado Macapagal from 1963 to 1964, and under President Ferdinand Marcos from 1968 to 1984.

==== Bandung Conference ====
In April 1955, he led the Philippines' delegation to the Asian-African Conference at Bandung, Indonesia . During the conference, his opinions remained unpopular among Asian countries. Romulo warned against the threats of communism in Asia and justified that SEATO as a purely defensive and non-aggressive security pact. However, his suggestions were not included in the final communique of the conference. Participating countries viewed that colonialism, racialism, cultural suppression, discrimination, and nuclear weapons were considered regional threats.

=== Resignation from the Marcos cabinet ===
Romulo supported President Ferdinand Marcos through most of his presidency. However, he resigned in 1983, soon after the assassination of Benigno Aquino, citing poor health. Gregorio Brillantes interviewed Romulo in 1984, and Romulo said he resigned "heartsick" because of the assassination of Aquino, whom he considered a "friend", and the resulting freefall of the Philippines' economy and international reputation.

According to Romulo's wife, Beth Day Romulo, the Marcos administration had asked him to sign an advertisement that the administration was planning to place in the New York Times and other major international dailies. Romulo refused to sign the advertisement and instead resigned.

== Death and legacy ==
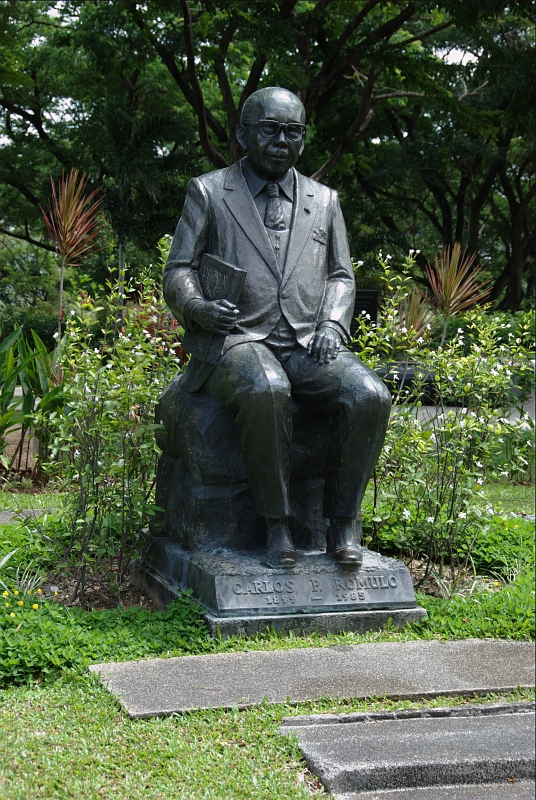
Romulo's grave and statue at Libingan ng nga Bayani in Taguig.

Romulo died, aged 86, in Manila on December 15, 1985 of circulatory collapse, and was buried in the Libingan ng mga Bayani at Fort Bonifacio, Taguig City.

He was honored as "one of the truly great statesmen of the 20th century". In 1980, he was extolled by UN Secretary-General Kurt Waldheim as "Mr. United Nations" for his valuable services to the UN and his dedication to freedom and world peace.

== Published books ==
Romulo, in all, wrote and published 22 books, including The United (novel), I Walked with Heroes (autobiography), I Saw the Fall of the Philippines, Mother America, and I See the Philippines Rise (war-time memoirs). In 1982, he was proclaimed a National Artist for Literature of the Philippines, in recognition of his contributions to Philippine Literature.

== Honors ==
=== National Honors ===
- Bayani ng Bagong Republika (Hero of the New Republic Award) – (14 January 1984)
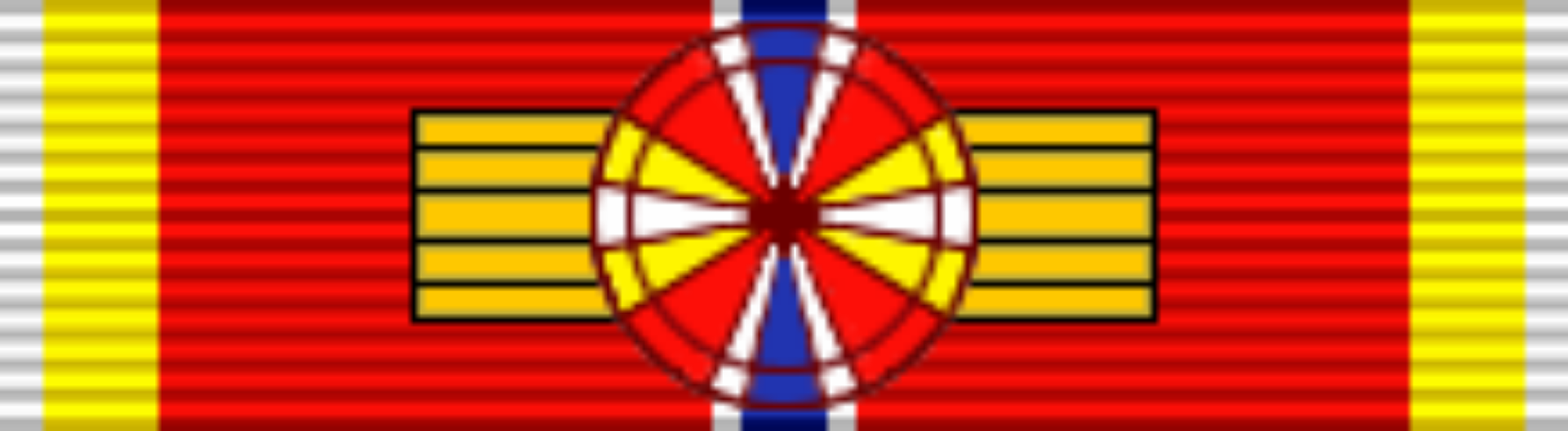
- Grand Collar of the Order of Sikatuna, Rank of Raja – (1982).
- : Philippine Legion of Honor, Commander (Komandante)
- : National Artist of the Philippines
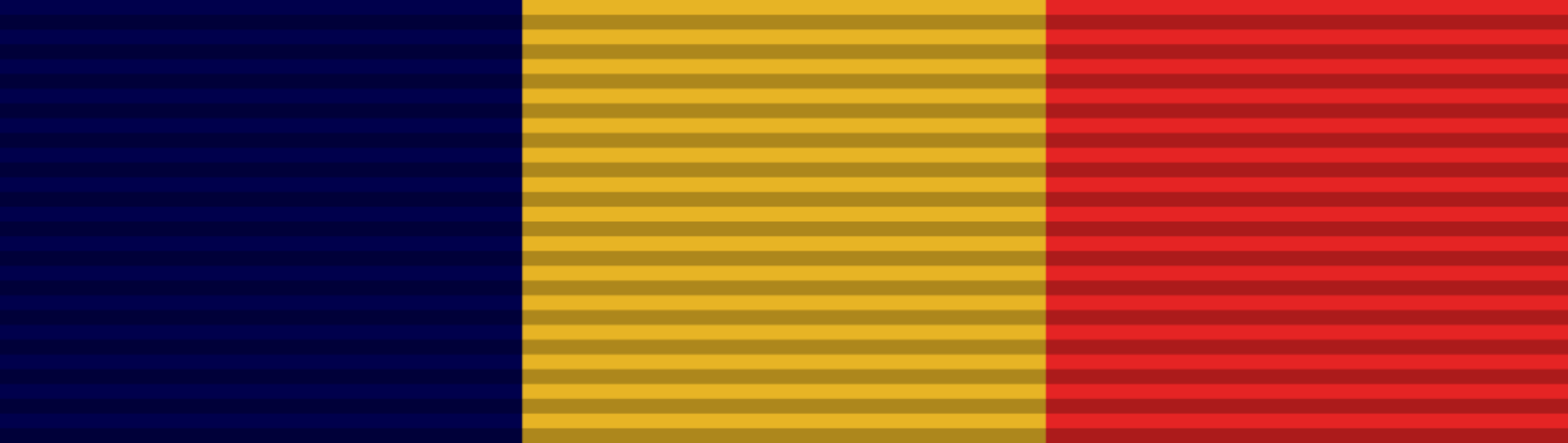
- : Grand Cross (Dakilang Kamanong) of the Gawad Mabini – (2005)
- : Grand Cross (Maringal na Krus) of the Order of the Golden Heart – (1954)
- : Member (Kagawad) of the Order of the Golden Heart – (13 September 1954)
- : Presidential Medal of Merit – (July 3, 1949)
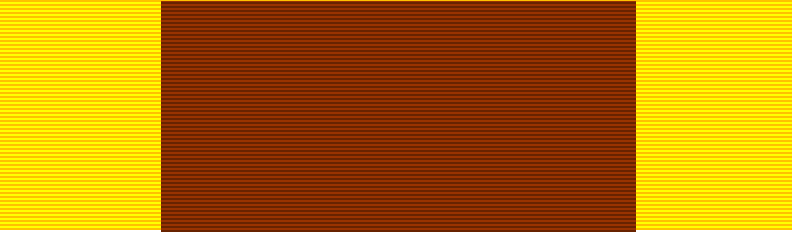
- : Order of the Knights of Rizal, Knight Grand Cross of Rizal. – (1961)

=== Military Medals (Philippines) ===
- : Distinguished Service Star
- : Philippine Gold Cross
- : Philippine Defense Medal
- : Philippine Liberation Medal

=== Military Medals (Foreign) ===
- : Commander, Legion of Merit (10 March 1950)
- : Silver Star
- : Purple Heart
- : Asiatic–Pacific Campaign Medal

=== Foreign Honors ===
- Argentina:
  - Grand Cross of the Order of the Liberator General San Martín (1983)
- Cuba:
  - Grand Cross of the Order of Carlos Manuel do Cespedes
- France:
  - Grand Cross of the National Order of the Legion of Honour
- Greece:
  - Grand Cross of the Order of the Phoenix
- Indonesia:
  - 2nd Class of the Star of the Republic of Indonesia (February 16, 1979)
- Portugal:
  - : Grand Cross of the Military Order of Christ
- Spain:
  - : Knight Grand Cross of the Order of Isabella the Catholic
- United States:
  - : Presidential Medal of Freedom
- Taiwan:
  - : Grand Cordon of the Order of Brilliant Star
- Yugoslavia:
  - : Order of the Yugoslav Star with Sash (1974)

== Awards and recognitions ==
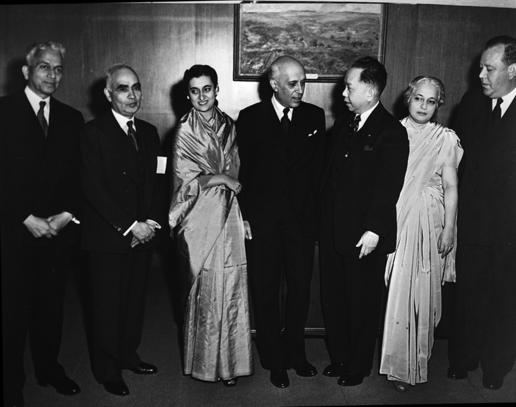
Gen. Romulo (3d from R), as President of the United Nations General Assembly, talks with Prime Minister Jawaharlal Nehru

Romulo is perhaps among the most decorated Filipinos in history. He has been awarded 72 honorary degrees from different international institutions and universities and 144 awards and decorations from foreign countries:

- Nobel Peace Prize nomination in 1952 "For his contribution in international cooperation, in particular on questions on undeveloped areas, and as president for UN's 4th General Assembly"
- Boy Scouts of America Silver Buffalo Award
- Presidential Unit Citation with Two Oak Leaf Clusters
- Pulitzer Prize in Correspondence, 1942
- World Government News First Annual Gold Nadal Award (for work in the United Nations for peace and world government), March 1947
- Princeton University – Woodrow Wilson Memorial Foundation Gold Medal award ("in recognition of his contribution to public life"), May 1947
- International Benjamin Franklin Society's Gold Medal (for "distinguished world statesmanship in 1947"), January 1948
- Freeman of the City of Plymouth, England, October 1948
- United Nations Peace Medal
- World Peace Award
- Four Freedoms Peace Award
- Sons of the American Revolution Gold Good Citizenship Medal
- Notre Dame University, Doctor of Laws (LL.D.), 1935
- Georgetown University, Doctor of Laws (LL.D.), 1960
- Harvard University, Doctor of Laws (LL.D.), 1950

== Anecdotes from Beth Romulo through Reader's Digest (June 1989) ==
At the third UN General Assembly, held in Paris in 1948, the USSR's deputy foreign minister, Andrei Vyshinsky, sneered at Romulo and challenged his credentials: "You are just a little man from a little country." "It is the duty of the little Davids of this world," cried Romulo, "to fling the pebbles of truth in the eyes of the blustering Goliaths and force them to behave!"

During his meeting with Josip Broz Tito of Yugoslavia, Marshal Tito welcomed Gen. Romulo with drinks and cigars, to which the general kindly refused. Their conversation went as follows:

Tito: "Do you drink?"

Romulo: "No, I don't."

Tito: "Do you smoke?"

Romulo: "No, thank you."

Tito: "What do you do then?"

Romulo: "I etcetera."

At this, Marshal Tito was tickled by his reply and loudly exclaimed around the room, "I etcetera, etcetera, etcetera!"

Romulo was a dapper little man (barely five feet four inches in shoes). When they waded in at Leyte beach in October 1944, and the word went out that General MacArthur was waist deep, one of Romulo's journalist friends cabled, "If MacArthur was in water waist deep, Romulo must have drowned!"

In later years, Romulo told another story himself about a meeting with MacArthur and other tall American generals who disparaged his physical stature. "Gentlemen," he declared, "When you say something like that, you make me feel like a dime among nickels."

== Books ==
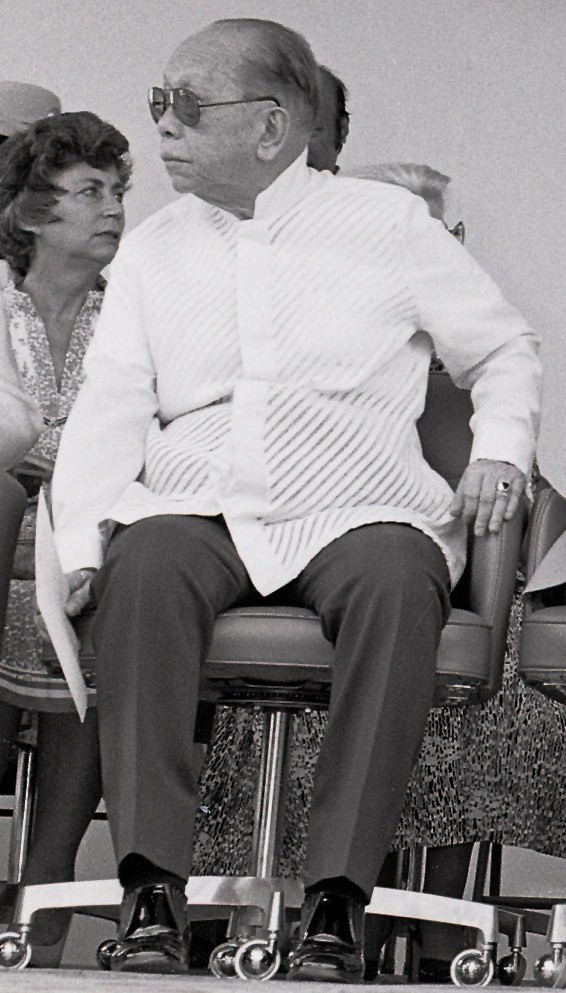
Carlos P. Romulo at the Clark Air Base (1979)

- I Saw the Fall of the Philippines.
- My Brother Americans
- I See The Philippines Rise
- I am a Filipino
- The United
- Crusade in Asia (The John Day Company, 1955; about the 1953 presidential election campaign of Ramón Magsaysay)
- The Meaning of Bandung
- The Magsaysay Story (with Marvin M. Gray, The John Day Company 1956, updated re-edition by Pocket Books, Special Student Edition, SP-18, December 1957; biography of Ramón Magsaysay, Pocket Books edition updated with an additional chapter on Magsaysay's death)
- I Walked with Heroes (autobiography)
- Last Man off Bataan (Romulo's experience during the Japanese Plane bombings.)
- Romulo: A Third World Soldier at the UN
- Daughters for Sale and Other Plays

== See also ==
- List of Filipino Nobel laureates and nominees
- List of Asian Americans and Pacific Islands Americans in the United States Congress
- Resident Commissioner of the Philippines
- The Thomasites
- Philinda Rand

== Citations ==
U.S. House of Representatives
Preceded by Joaquín Miguel Elizalde	Resident Commissioner from the Philippines to the United States Congress; 1944–1946	Post abolished
Government offices
Preceded by Sergio Osmeña as Secretary of Public Instruction, Health, and Public Welfare	Secretary of Public Instruction and Information; 1944–1945	Succeeded by Maximo Kalaw as Secretary of Instruction
Preceded by Felino Neri Salvador P. Lopez	Secretary of Foreign Affairs; 1950–1951; 1963–1964	Succeeded by Joaquín Miguel Elizalde Mauro Mendez
Preceded by Alejandro Roces	Secretary of Education; 1965–1967	Succeeded by Onofre Corpuz; Acting
Preceded by Narciso Ramos as Secretary of Foreign Affairs	Minister of Foreign Affairs; 1968–1984	Succeeded by Manuel Collantes; Acting
Diplomatic posts
Preceded by Herbert Vere Evatt	President of the United Nations General Assembly; 1949–1950	Succeeded by Nasrollah Entezam
Academic offices
Preceded by Vicente G. Sinco	President of the University of the Philippines; 1962–1968	Succeeded by Salvador P. Lopez
