= Amir-Saeid Iravani =

Iranian diplomat

- امیرسعید ایروانی
- Iravani in 2026

Ambassador of Iran to the United Nations
- Incumbent
- Assumed office 7 September 2022
- President: Ebrahim Raisi; Masoud Pezeshkian
- Preceded by: Majid Takht-Ravanchi

Personal details
- Born: 17 September 1961 (age 65) Kermanshah, Iran
- Children: 2
- Education: University of Tehran; Bhopal University

Amir-Saeid Iravani (Persian: امیرسعید ایروانی) is an Iranian diplomat who has been the permanent representative of Iran to the United Nations since 7 September 2022. Prior to this role, he held several positions, including Deputy Secretary for Foreign Policy and International Security on Iran's Supreme National Security Council from 2013 to 2021, and Iran's ambassador to Iraq from 1998 to 2001. Born on 17 September 1961, Iravani holds a Master of Arts in State Management from the University of Tehran and a Bachelor of Science in mathematics from Bhopal University in India.

In October 2024, Iravani condemned Israeli military actions in Lebanon during a UN Security Council session. He described the attacks as violations of international law and called for immediate cessation of hostilities, urging the Council to hold Israel accountable. In June 2025, Iravani was condemned by the Israeli representative, Danny Danon, as a "wolf in a suit" after Israel attacked Iran's nuclear program sparking the Twelve-Day War due to Iranian support for Hezbollah, Hamas, Palestinian Islamic Jihad, and the Houthis, as well as Israel holding Iran responsible for the October 7 attacks.

In November 2024, The New York Times reported that Elon Musk met privately with Iravani for over an hour at the diplomat's New York residence to discuss reducing bilateral tensions. While the meeting was confirmed by both U.S. and Iranian officials wishing to remain anonymous, the Iranian Foreign Ministry later issued a formal denial. At that time, the Biden administration told CNN that it was unaware of the rendezvous, and the Trump transition team declined to confirm or deny the report.

== See also ==
- List of Iranian officials
