= I Walked with Heroes =

- Book cover for Carlos P. Romulo's I Walked with Heroes.
- Author: Carlos P. Romulo
- Language: English
- Genre: Autobiography
- Publication place: Philippines

I Walked with Heroes is an autobiographical book written by Carlos P. Romulo, a former Philippine general, journalist, poet, story writer, diplomat, former resident commissioner to Washington, D.C., former Philippine ambassador to the United States, and former President of the United Nations General Assembly.

== Description ==
In I Walked with Heroes, Romulo personally reviewed his boyhood, early life, school days, and career in which he presented the facts and events with "frankness, intimacy, sense of person-to-person communication". It included Romulo's memories of his parents and the first time he met the Americans in the person of soldiers stationed in Camiling, his native town in Tarlac. The time was during the Philippine War of Independence. The nameless soldier taught Romulo and other Filipino boys how to read and write in English using Edward Baldwin's Primer. Romulo also narrated his life in Manila when he was both a morning-time student and an evening-time news reporter. A part of the book mentioned how Romulo was praised by then President of the Philippine Senate Manuel L. Quezon after writing a news item against Quezon's political opponents. In the pages of the autobiography, the reader would find that Romulo was comfortable in employing humor such as "telling jokes on himself", particularly in reference to his height to make the reader enjoy his writing. The book revealed Romulo's "unfailing faith in mankind".
