= Mohammad Khazaee =

Iranian diplomat (born 1953)

- محمد خزاعی
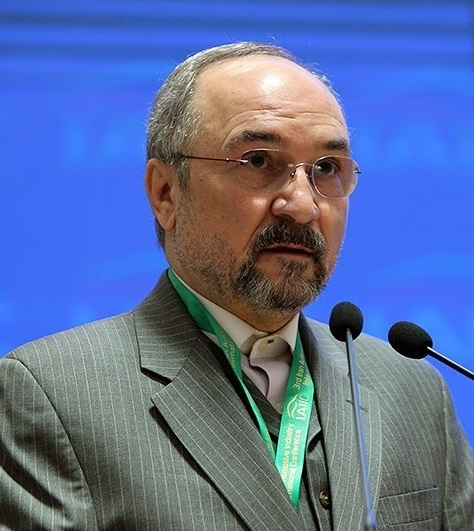
- Mohammad Khazaee in 2016

Ambassador of Iran to the United Nations
- In office 25 July 2007 – 9 March 2014
- President: Mahmoud Ahmadinejad; Hassan Rouhani
- Preceded by: Mohammad Javad Zarif
- Succeeded by: Gholamali Khoshroo

Member of the Parliament of Iran
- In office 3 May 1981 – 3 May 1988
- Constituency: Rasht
- Majority: 65,935 (44.20%)

Personal details
- Born: April 12, 1953 (age 73) Kashmar, Iran
- Education: University of Guilan; George Mason University

Mohammad Khazaee (Persian: محمد خزاعی; born 12 April 1953 in Kashmar, Iran) is the former ambassador of Iran to the United Nations. He presented his credentials to the United Nations Secretary-General Ban Ki-moon in July 2007. He was elected as Vice President of the United Nations General Assembly on 14 September 2011.

== Career ==
=== Education ===
Khazaee has a B.A. in business administration from the University of Guilan. He also holds a master's degree in international transactions from George Mason University in the United States, Mr. Khazaee has taught macroeconomics and philosophy at Tehran's Allameh Tabatabai University.

=== Parliament ===
From 1981 to 1988, Khazaee was a Member of Parliament, where he served as Rapporteur of the Economic Committee (1982–1988) and the Banking Reform Committee (1981–1982).

=== Government appointments ===
Prior to receiving his appointment as permanent representative, Khazaee held positions in international development financing between 2002 and 2007, serving as both vice-minister for international affairs and president of the Organization for Economic and Technical Assistance in Iran's Ministry of Economic Affairs. Concurrently, he served as governor of the OPEC Fund, vice-chairman of that organization's investment committee, alternate governor for the Islamic Development Bank and alternate governor for the asian Infrastructure Investment Bank and a board member of the Iran-Misr (Iran-Egypt) Development Bank. He is member general council international chambers of commerce . From 1988 to 2002, he represented Iran at the World Bank.

Diplomatic posts
Preceded by Mohammad Javad Zarif	Ambassador of Iran to the United Nations; 2007–2015	Succeeded by Gholamali Khoshroo
