= Maryam Imanieh =

Iranian politician

- مریم ایمانیه
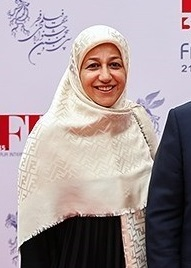

Head of Diplomatic Ladies Association (DLA)
- In office 2013–2021
- President: Hassan Rouhani

Personal details
- Spouse: Mohammad Javad Zarif (m. 1979)
- Children: 2

Maryam Imanieh (Persian: مریم ایمانیه) is the wife of Mohammad Javad Zarif. They married in 1979. She is known for her role in negotiations leading to the Joint Comprehensive Plan of Action.
