= Mohammad Javad Zarif =

Iranian politician and former Vice President of Iran (born 1960)

- محمدجواد ظریف
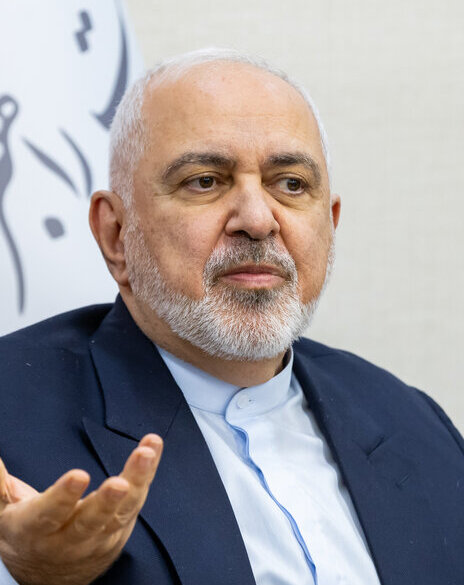
- Zarif in 2025

Vice President of Iran for Strategic Affairs
- In office 1 August 2024 – 2 March 2025
- President: Masoud Pezeshkian
- Preceded by: Position established
- Succeeded by: Mohsen Esmaeili

Advisor to the President of Iran Head of Center for Strategic Studies
- In office 1 August 2024 – 2 March 2025
- President: Masoud Pezeshkian
- Preceded by: Mostafa Zamanian
- Succeeded by: Mohsen Esmaeili

Minister of Foreign Affairs of Iran
- In office 15 August 2013 – 25 August 2021
- President: Hassan Rouhani
- Deputy: Morteza Sarmadi
- Preceded by: Ali Akbar Salehi
- Succeeded by: Hossein Amir-Abdollahian

Chief Nuclear Negotiator of Iran
- In office 6 September 2013 – 14 July 2015
- President: Hassan Rouhani
- Deputy: Abbas Araghchi
- Preceded by: Saeed Jalili
- Succeeded by: Abbas Araghchi (as head of JCPOA follow-up commission)

Ambassador of Iran to the United Nations
- In office 5 August 2002 – 25 July 2007
- President: Mohammad Khatami; Mahmoud Ahmadinejad
- Preceded by: Mohammad Hadi Nejad Hosseinian
- Succeeded by: Mohammad Khazaee

Personal details
- Born: 8 January 1960 (age 66) Tehran, Imperial State of Iran
- Party: Independent
- Spouse: Maryam Imanieh (m. 1979)
- Children: 2
- Awards: see below
- Website: Government site

Academic background
- Education: San Francisco State (BA, MA); University of Denver (MA, PhD)
- Thesis: Self-Defense in International Law and Policy (1988)

Academic work
- Institutions: School of International Relations; University of Tehran; Islamic Azad University

Mohammad Javad Zarif (Persian pronunciation: [mohæmːædd͡ʒæˌvɒːde zæˌɾiːf]; born 8 January 1960) is an Iranian career diplomat and academic. He served as the vice president for strategic affairs from August 2024 to March 2025. He was the foreign minister of Iran from 2013 until 2021 in the government of Hassan Rouhani.

During his tenure as foreign minister, Zarif led the Iranian negotiation with P5+1 countries which produced the Joint Comprehensive Plan of Action on 14 July 2015, lifting the economic sanctions against Iran on 16 January 2016. Zarif resigned from his post as foreign minister in February 2019. His resignation was rejected by Supreme Leader of Iran, Ali Khamenei, and he continued as foreign minister.

Zarif has held various significant diplomatic and cabinet posts. He is a visiting professor at the School of International Relations and University of Tehran, teaching diplomacy and international organizations. He was the Permanent Representative of Iran to the United Nations from 2002 to 2007. He served as an advisor and senior advisor to the Foreign Minister, Deputy Foreign Minister in Legal and International affairs, member of the UN Eminent Persons Group on Dialogue Among Civilizations, Head of the UN Disarmament Commission in New York, and Vice President for International Affairs of the Islamic Azad University.

== Early life and education ==
Zarif was born in Tehran around 1960, although other sources have given the year of birth as 1959 and 1961. According to The New Republic, Zarif was born to an "affluent, religiously devout and politically conservative merchant family in Tehran". His father was one of the most well-known businessmen of Isfahan, and his mother Efat Kashani (d. 2013) was the daughter of one of the most famous businessmen of Tehran. He was educated at the Alavi School, a private religious institution.

Zarif was shielded from TV, radio, and newspapers by his parents as a youth. Instead, he became exposed to revolutionary ideas by reading the books of Ali Shariati and Samad Behrangi.

At age 17, he left Iran for the United States. Zarif attended Drew College Preparatory School, a private college-preparatory high school located in San Francisco, California. He went on to study at San Francisco State University, from which he gained a B.A. in 1981 and M.A. in 1982, both in international relations. Following this, Zarif continued his studies at the Josef Korbel School of International Studies, University of Denver, from which he obtained a second M.A. in international relations in 1984 and a Ph.D. in international law and policy in 1988. His thesis was titled "Self-Defense in International Law and Policy."

Tom Rowe, a professor at the graduate school who led the committee that oversaw Zarif's dissertation, said: "He was among the very best students that I've ever taught." Ved Nanda, who taught and was on Zarif's dissertation committee, recalled: "[He was] good in the classroom. At that time ... I thought he'd play an important part in his country's life."

== Initial missions in the US ==
In May 1982 – four years after the Iranian Revolution – Zarif was appointed a member of the Iranian delegation to the United Nations largely due to his English-speaking ability and relationships in America, rather than formal diplomatic training. As a junior diplomat Zarif was involved in negotiations to win the release of U.S. hostages held by pro-Iranian gunmen in Lebanon, according to the memoirs of former United Nations envoy Giandomenico Picco. Even though the United States did not make a promised reciprocal goodwill gesture at the time, Zarif remained committed to improving ties.

In 2000, Zarif served as chairman of the Asian preparatory meeting of the World Conference against Racism and as chairman of the United Nations Disarmament Commission. Zarif was also professor of international law at the University of Tehran. He served as the vice president of Islamic Azad University in charge of foreign affairs from 2010 to 2012 under Abdollah Jasbi. He has served on the board of editors of a number of scholarly journals, including the Iranian Journal of International Affairs and Iranian Foreign Policy, and has written extensively on disarmament, human rights, international law, and regional conflicts.

== Representative at the United Nations (2002–2007) ==
Zarif served as Iran's representative at the United Nations from 2002 to 2007. He was closely linked with developing the so-called "Grand Bargain," a plan to resolve outstanding issues between the U.S. and Iran in 2003. Zarif, during his time at the UN, held private meetings with a number of Washington politicians, including the then-Senators Joseph Biden and Chuck Hagel. He resigned from office on 6 July 2007. He was succeeded by Mohammad Khazaee in the post.

In 2007, Zarif was a headline speaker at an American Iranian Council conference in New Brunswick, New Jersey including Chuck Hagel, Dennis Kucinich, Nicholas Kristof, and Anders Liden to discuss Iranian-American relations, and potential ways to increase dialogue and avoid conflict.

== Minister of Foreign Affairs (2013–2021) ==
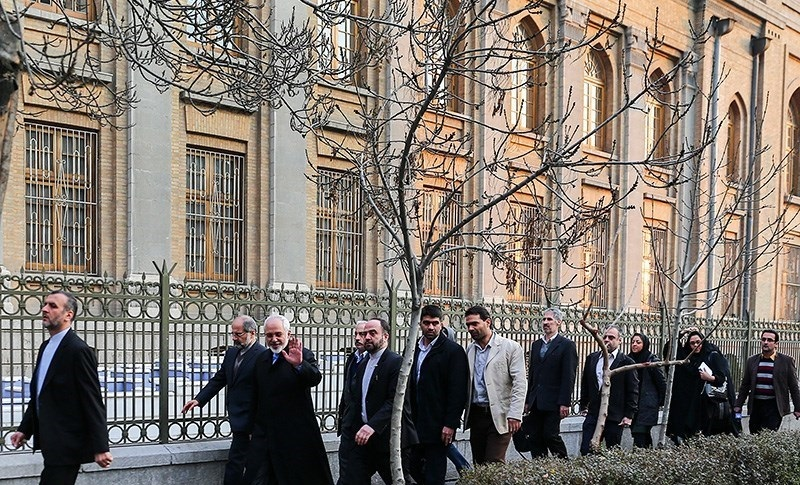
Zarif outside of Iran's Ministry of Foreign Affairs

On 23 July 2013, it was reported that Zarif was Rouhani's choice for minister of foreign affairs. This was not confirmed by the president-elect's office until 4 August when Rouhani officially nominated Zarif for the position to the Iranian Parliament. He was confirmed by the parliament with 232 votes, replacing Ali Akbar Salehi in the position.

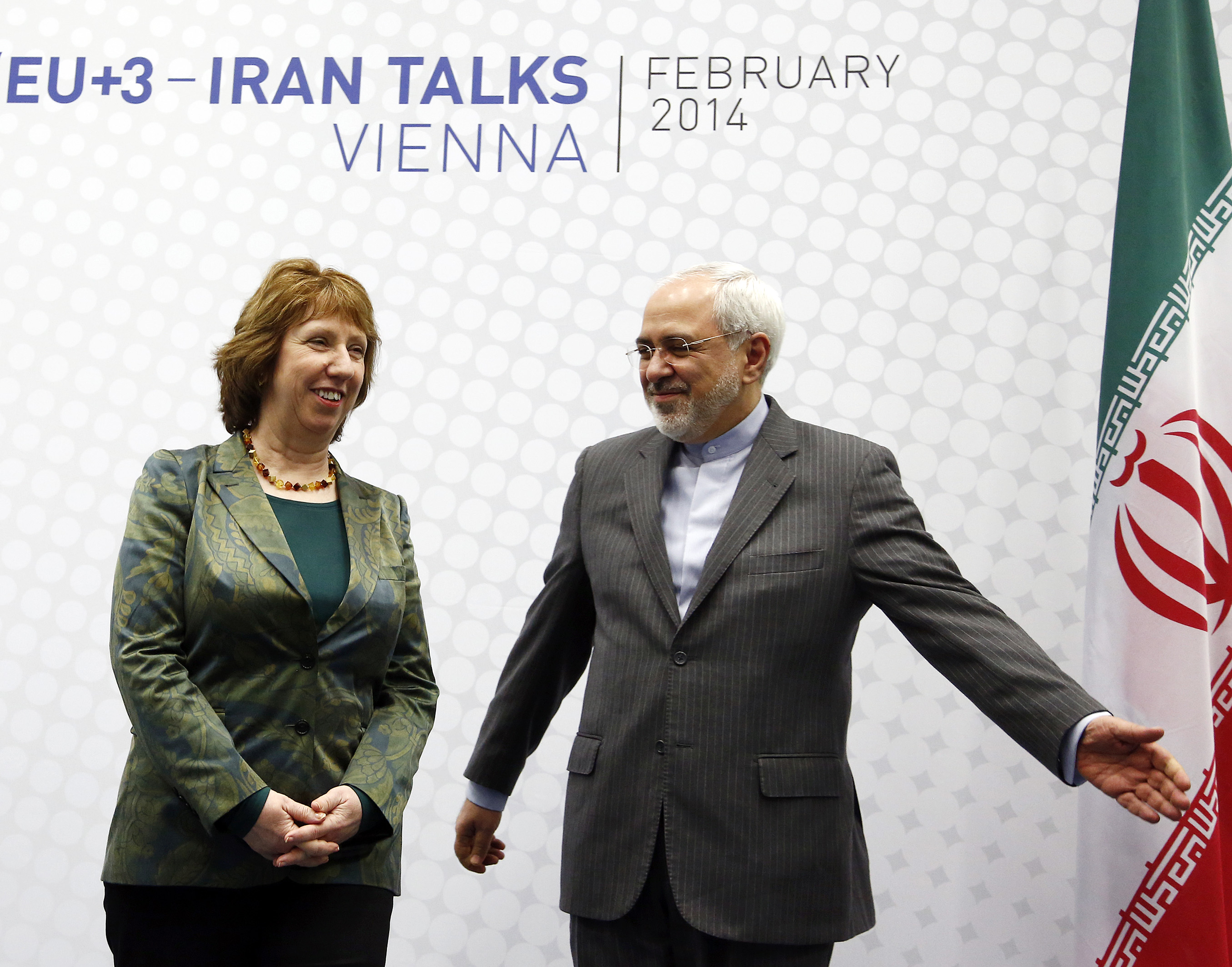
Zarif with then-EU High Representative Catherine Ashton in Vienna, 18 February 2014

Zarif welcomed the first visit by a foreign leader to Iran since Rouhani assumed the presidency ten days after his approval as Foreign Minister with the arrival of Oman's sultan, Qaboos bin Said Al Said. Stories spread that there was a secret agenda to his meetings with Iranian officials, involving claims that he came to convey messages from the United States and then to relay Iran's response to White House officials.

On 27 September 2013, he met with United States Secretary of State John Kerry during P5+1 and Iran summit. It was the highest-level direct contact between the United States and Iran in the last six years. After the meeting, Kerry said that "We had a constructive meeting, and I think all of us were pleased that Foreign Minister Zarif came and made a presentation to us, which was very different in tone and very different in the vision that he held out with respect to possibilities of the future."

After the breakup of talks on 12 November, Zarif rejected Kerry's claim that Iran had been unable to accept the deal "at that particular moment". He said "no amount of spinning" could change what had happened in Geneva, but it could "further erode confidence". Zarif appeared to blame France for "gutting over half" of a US draft deal. Representatives from Iran and the so-called P5+1 – met again on 20 November.

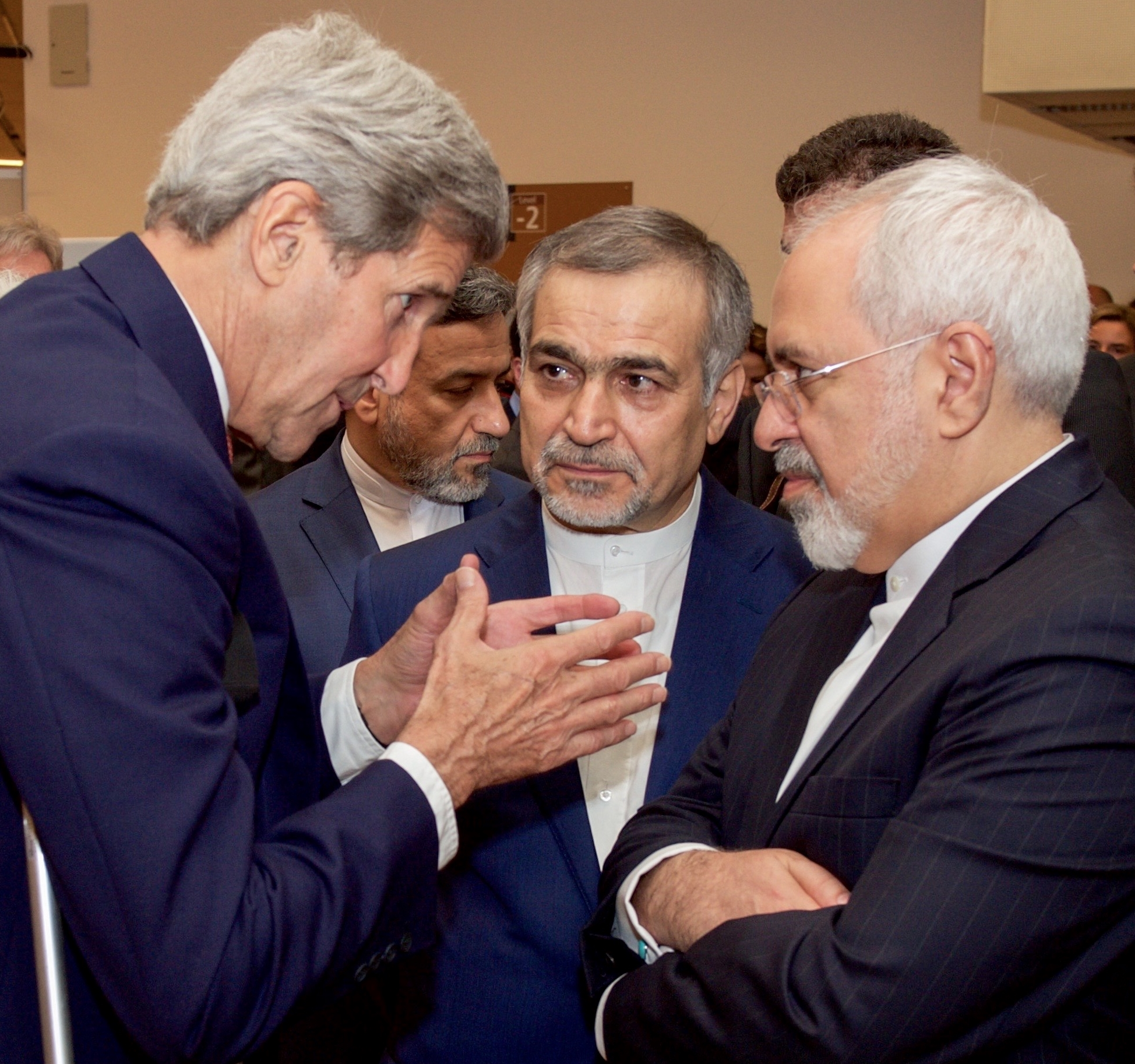
John Kerry with Hossein Fereydoun, the brother of 7th President of Iran Hassan Rouhani and Mohammad Javad Zarif during the announcement of the Joint Comprehensive Plan of Action, 14 July 2015

Talks between senior American, Iranian and European diplomats in October 2014 produced no breakthrough agreement on curbing Iran's nuclear program, but officials said they still aimed to reach a deal by the 24 November deadline. A senior State Department official characterized each step of progress in the talks as "chipping away" at complex, technical differences, with virtually every sentence requiring an appendix of further explanation. "We continue to make progress, but there is still a substantial amount of work to be done," said the official, who spoke on the condition of anonymity to discuss the difficult and secretive negotiations.

Zarif and Kerry conferred, ahead of a fresh round of negotiations between Iran and six world powers in Geneva, on settling their 12-year standoff over Tehran's nuclear ambitions. Lower-level negotiators on both sides met at the same venue on 15 January 2015 to iron out technical details ahead of negotiations 3 days later between Iran and the "P5+1" powers – the US, France, Germany, Russia, China and Britain. Speaking at a Tehran news conference, Zarif said the purpose of the talks with Kerry "is to see if we can speed up and push the negotiations forward".

In February, Zarif said that Iran did not favor another extension of the talks on limiting its nuclear program and expected economic sanctions to be quickly lifted if an accord was reached. At a security conference in Munich, he said "Sanctions are a liability; you need to get rid of them if you want a solution." Of the long effort to forge an agreement, he said "This is the opportunity to do it, and we need to seize this opportunity. It may not be repeated." The nuclear talks have already been extended twice and face a late March deadline for working out the main outlines of an accord. The deadline for a detailed agreement is the end of June.

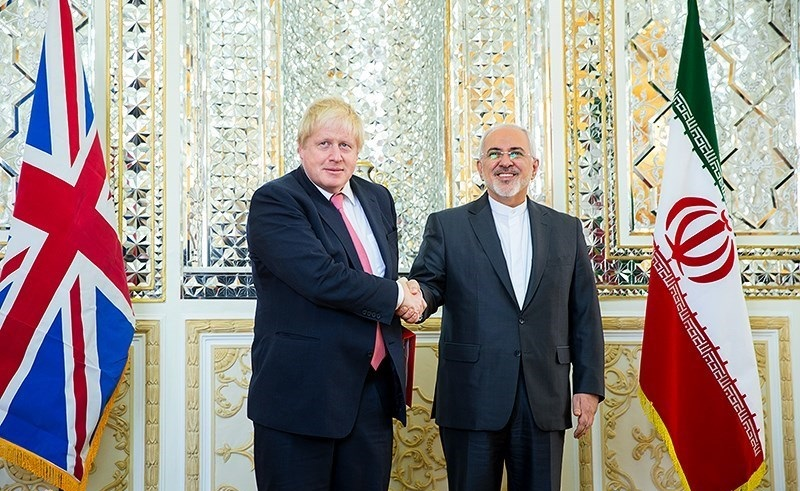
Zarif with then-U.K. Foreign Secretary Boris Johnson, 9 December 2017

Based on the Iran nuclear deal framework, which was declared on 2 April, Iran agreed to accept significant restrictions on its nuclear program for at least a decade and submit to international inspections under a framework deal. In return, international sanctions would be lifted; whether in phases or all at once still needed to be worked out.

=== Nuclear agreement ===
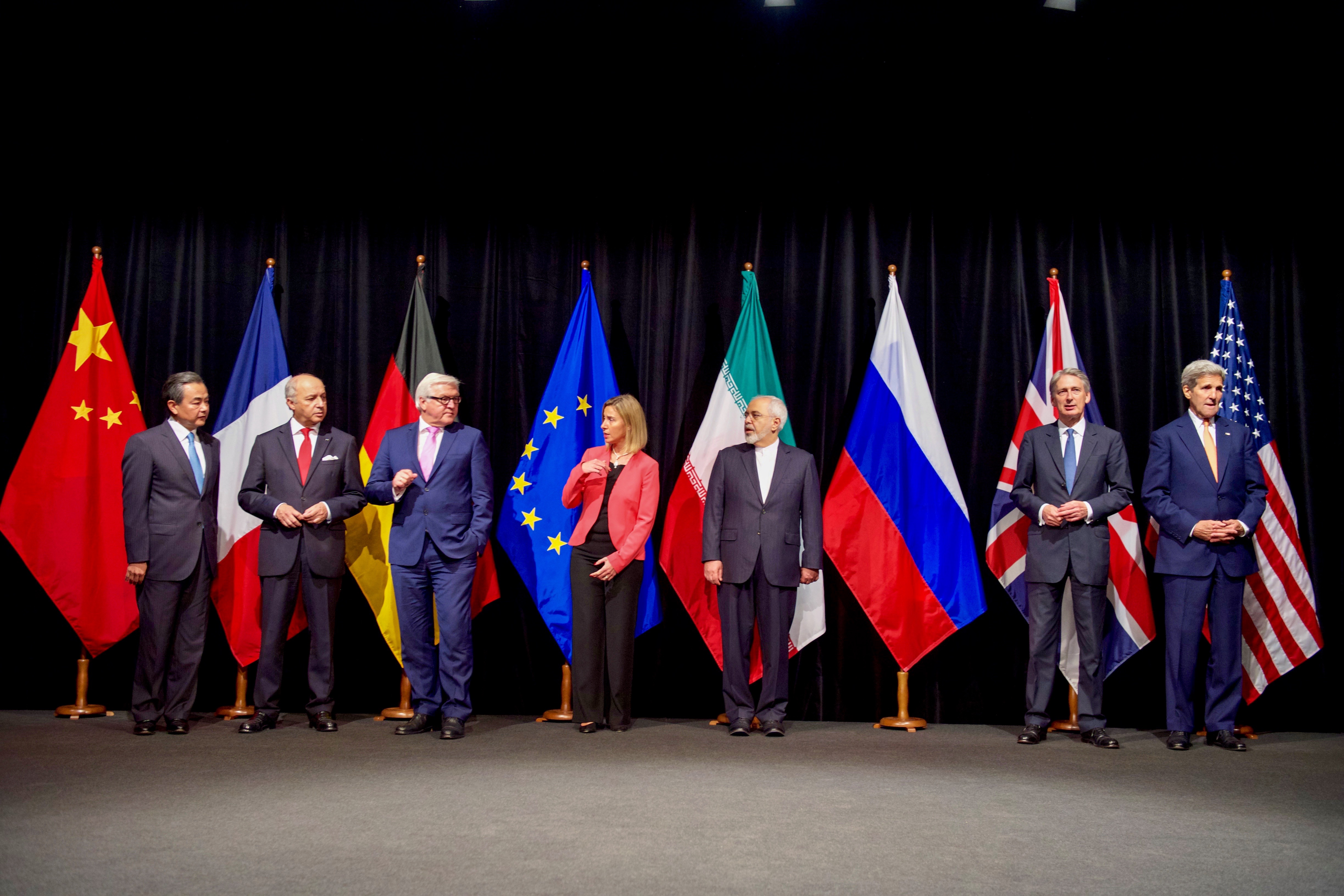
Zarif posed for a group photo shortly after finalizing the Iran nuclear deal in Vienna on 4 July 2015

On 21 November, it was reported by Iranian negotiators that progress was being made in talks in Geneva with world powers, expressing hope to bridge differences and sign an elusive deal over Tehran's nuclear drive. In statements carried by Iranian media after a one-hour meeting with Baroness Ashton, Zarif said "Differences of opinion remain and we are negotiating over them. God willing we will reach a result." Three days later, the Geneva interim agreement, officially titled the Joint Plan of Action, was signed between Iran and the P5+1 countries in Geneva, Switzerland. It consisted of a short-term freeze of portions of Iran's nuclear program in exchange for decreased economic sanctions on Iran, as the countries worked toward a long-term agreement.

=== Foreign affairs ===
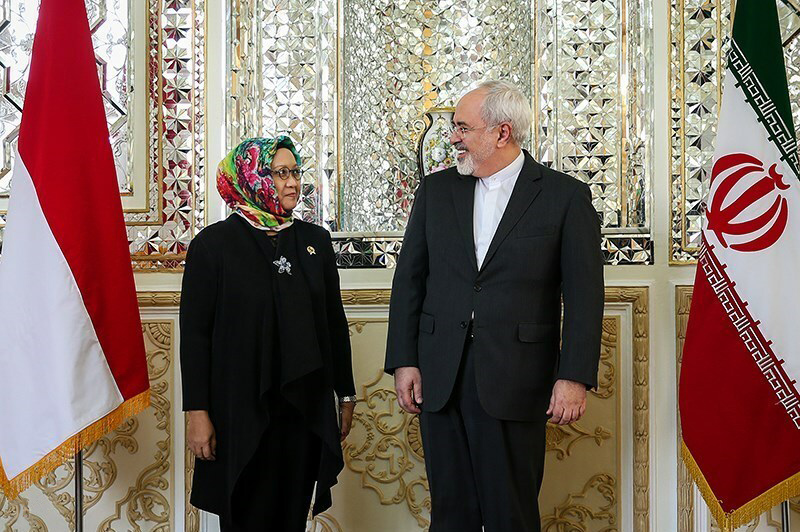
Iranian Foreign Minister Mohammad Javad Zarif and his Indonesian counterpart Retno Marsudi held a meeting in the Iranian capital of Tehran on 13 January 2016.

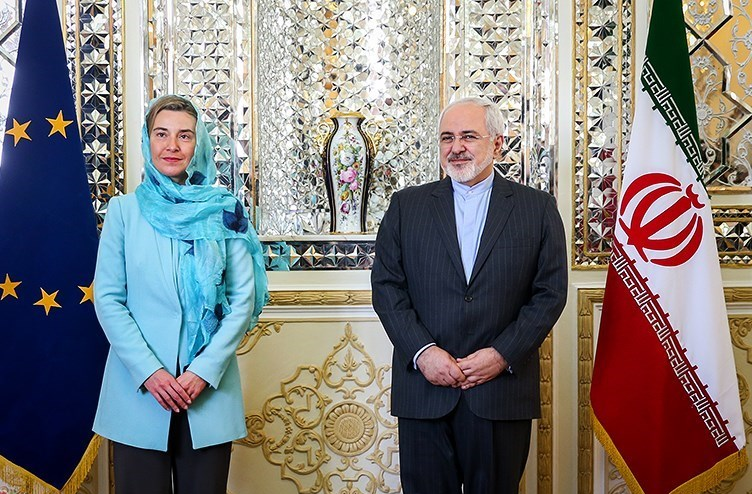
Zarif with EU High Representative Federica Mogherini in Tehran, 16 April 2016

On 29 April 2015, while appearing on The Charlie Rose Show, Zarif was asked about the detention of Jason Rezaian, the Washington Post reporter held in Iran for the past nine months. He responded, "We do not jail people for their opinions[.]"

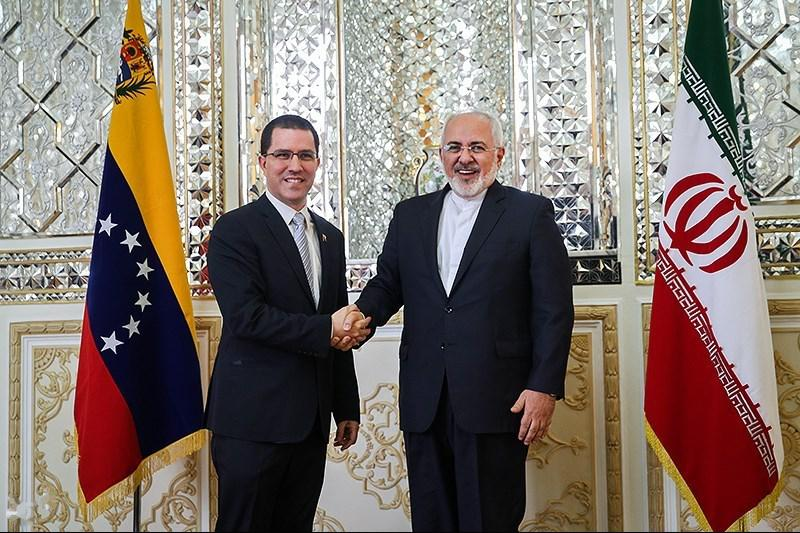
Zarif with Venezuela's Foreign Minister Jorge Arreaza, 2018

Zarif condemned U.S. involvement in the Saudi Arabian-led intervention in Yemen, saying the United States should be held "accountable for crimes against humanity".

On 11 February 2019, Zarif met with Hezbollah leader Hassan Nasrallah in Beirut. Nasrallah thanked Zarif for Iran's support of Hezbollah's fight against 'Zionist aggression', and Zarif affirmed his country's "firm stance that supports Lebanon and its state, people and resistance".

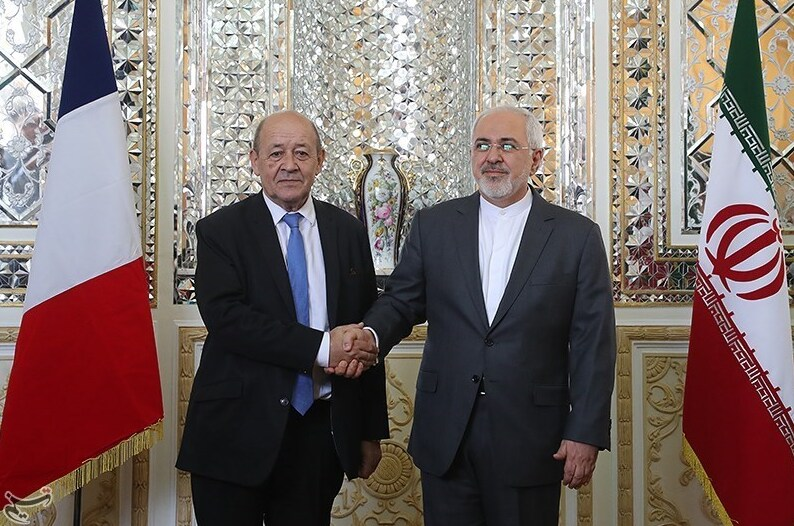
Zarif with French Foreign Minister Jean-Yves Le Drian in Tehran, 5 March 2018

In an April 2019 interview conducted by CBS News, Zarif said that he was the one who proposed a prisoner swap with the U.S. government six months prior, with the approach having been left unanswered by the U.S. Zarif further requested that the Trump administration "prove its seriousness" before any negotiations.

Zarif condemned the 2019 Turkish offensive into north-eastern Syria viewing it as a violation of Syria's sovereignty. However, regarding the US withdrawal from Syria, Zarif commented saying the US was an "irrelevant occupier in Syria", and said that Iran would be willing to mediate tensions between Syria and Turkey.

In a joint press conference with German Foreign Minister Heiko Maas in December 2019, Zarif defended the Islamic Republic's repressive human rights record. When a reporter from the German tabloid Bild questioned why citizens were being executed in Iran because of their sexual orientation, Zarif responded by saying, "Our society has moral principles. And we live according to these principles. That means that the law is respected and the law is obeyed."

=== Resignation ===
Zarif stepped down from his post on 25 February 2019, announcing his resignation on Instagram. After greetings in honor of Iranian Women's and Mothers' day, he wrote:

I am apologising [to] you (wholeheartedly) for my (inability to continue my service and any) shortcomings in the past years during my time as foreign minister... I thank the Iranian nation and officials.

Zarif did not elaborate or provide any further explanation. An aide said that one of the reasons for Zarif's resignation was anger over his exclusion that day from meetings with Syrian president Bashar al-Assad, who was visiting Tehran. Rouhani rejected Zarif's resignation two days later. Qasem Soleimani, the head of Iran's Quds Force, also rejected Zarif's resignation, with Soleimani remarking that Zarif is the "main person in charge of foreign policy."

== Vice President (2024–2025) ==
Zarif supported the candidacy of reformist Masoud Pezeshkian in the 2024 Iranian presidential election. Following Pezeshkian's victory, Zarif was tasked creating the committees to select ministers for Pezeshkian's cabinet. In August 2024, he was appointed by Pezeshkian as vice president in charge of strategic affairs. However, Zarif resigned shortly afterwards due to disagreements over the composition of Pezeshkian's cabinet, saying that the latter had failed to fulfill his promises to include more women, young people and ethnic groups. But on August 27, Zarif announced his return to the post. He resigned for a second time on March 2, 2025, which was accepted by Pezeshkian on April 15.

== Views ==
=== Leaked audiotape ===
On 25 April 2021, The New York Times published content from a leaked audiotape of a three-hour taped conversation between economist Saeed Laylaz and Zarif. The taped conversation was connected to an oral history project, "In the Islamic Republic the military field rules," that documents the work of Iran's current administration. The tape was obtained by the London-based news channel Iran International. In the tape, which the Times refers to as "extraordinary" moments, Zarif criticizes Qasem Soleimani, the commander of the Quds Force, and Iran's elite Islamic Revolutionary Guard Corps (IRGC) and alleges that former U.S. Secretary of State John Kerry told him that Israel attacked Iranian assets in Syria "at least 200 times." Although the tape has not been authenticated, the Iranian foreign ministry spokesman did not deny its validity.

=== Holocaust ===
On 5 September 2013, in an exchange prompted by his Rosh Hashanah greeting on Twitter as a Foreign Minister, Zarif said that Iran does not deny the Holocaust, distancing the government from the often belligerent stances by former President Mahmoud Ahmadinejad. Genuineness of Zarif's tweeting in English was confirmed by CNN's Christiane Amanpour. Zarif also called the Holocaust "tragically cruel" at a conference in Munich. However, his remarks drew backlash at home, leading to a summons by the Iranian Parliament for allegedly supporting "the lie of the Holocaust".

=== UAE–Israel relations ===
Zarif called the 2020 peace agreement between Israel and the United Arab Emirates a "painful betrayal" against Arab and non-Arab countries in the Middle East. On 6 March 2026, in a message leaked during the Iran war, Zarif said that United Arab Emirates and Israel are "one and the same." He argued that Iran should prioritize targeting the UAE alongside American and Israeli interests.

=== Calls to end 2026 Iran war ===
In April 2026, Zarif and former president Hassan Rouhani called for an end to the war with the United States and Israel. Zarif proposed a plan for a settlement that would go beyond a temporary ceasefire. His proposal, published in Foreign Affairs, included limiting uranium enrichment under international supervision, sanctions relief, and a potential non-aggression agreement with the United States. In response, an Iranian lawmaker called for the arrest of Zarif and Rouhani, and Saeed Haddadian called Zarif a "traitor" and threatened to raid his home.

== Sanctions ==
In July 2019 the United States imposed sanctions on Zarif, and he was identified by the US as an "illegitimate spokesperson for Iran". In response, a spokesman for European Union diplomatic chief Federica Mogherini stated, "We regret this decision."

== Awards and recognition ==
- 9th Iran National Industry Champions Festival's ‘Champion of Champions of Diplomacy’: 1392 SH
- KhabarOnline's ‘Face of The Year’: 1392 SH
- TIME's ‘100 Most Influential People in the World’ (2): 2014, 2015
- Global Risk Insights' ‘Person of the Year in Political Risk’: 2015
- Chatham House Prize: 2016 (shared with John Kerry)

=== National orders ===
Ribbon	Distinction	Country	Date	Location	Ref
	Order of Merit and Management, 1st Class	Iran	8 February 2016	Tehran	
	Grand Cross of Order of the Condor of the Andes	Bolivia	26 August 2016	La Paz	
	Order of Friendship	Kazakhstan	10 September 2018	Tehran	

== Personal life ==
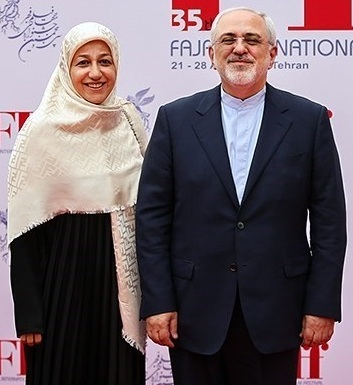
Zarif with his wife at 35th Fajr International Film Festival

Zarif has been married to Maryam Imanieh since 1979. The couple have a daughter, an interior decorator, and a son, a marketing consultant; both were born in the United States.

In addition to his native Persian, Zarif is also fluent in English.

== Public image ==
Zarif has gained some domestic popularity in Iran. His "Never threaten an Iranian!" remark, during the heated nuclear negotiations, attracted attention from global news agencies. According to a poll conducted by Information and Public Opinion Solutions LLC (iPOS) in March 2016, Zarif was the most popular political figure in Iran with 76% approval and 7% disapproval ratings.

On 3 March 2025, Zarif announced his resignation following a prolonged legal dispute concerning his appointment. In a detailed post on X, Zarif expressed that over the past six months, he and his family have faced severe insults, slanders, and threats, marking it as the most challenging period in his 40-year political career. Critics contended that his appointment violated the Constitution, citing that his children, born in the U.S., are natural-born American citizens. Zarif, who served as Foreign Minister for eight years and played a pivotal role in the 2015 nuclear deal, mentioned that the judiciary chief advised him to return to academia to alleviate pressure on the government.

== See also ==
- List of foreign ministers in 2017
- List of current foreign ministers
- Iran–United States relations during the Obama administration
- Iran–United States relations during the first Trump administration
- Iran–United States relations during the Biden administration

Diplomatic posts
Preceded by Hadi Nejad-Hosseinian	Ambassador to the United Nations; 2002–2007	Succeeded by Mohammad Khazaee
Preceded by Saeed Jalili	Chief Nuclear Negotiator of Iran; 2013–2015	Succeeded by Abbas Araghchi as Head of Joint Comprehensive Plan of Action Follow-up Commission
Government offices
Preceded by Ali Akbar Salehi	Minister of Foreign Affairs; 2013–2021	Succeeded by Hossein Amir-Abdollahian
