= Institute for Cognitive Science Studies =

Iranian research institution

- موسسه آموزش عالی علوم‌ شناختی
- Established: 1998
- President: Sohrab Hajizadeh
- Faculty: 30
- Students: 517
- Postgraduates: 517
- Location: Pardis, Tehran, Iran
- Website: icss.ac.ir

The Institute for Cognitive Science Studies (ICSS) (Persian: موسسه آموزش عالی علوم‌ شناختی, Moasesse-ye Amouzesh-e Aali-e Oloum-e Shenakhti) is a non-governmental, non-profit advanced research institution in Pardis, Tehran, Iran, committed to promoting research and educational efforts that bring together the various disciplines that contribute to cognitive sciences and its related technologies.

== History and objectives ==
The institute was initially established as a study group by the same name in 1997 at Shahid Beheshti University, and later accredited by the Ministry of Science, Research and Technology in 2003 to accept graduate students. In 2016, it departed from its parent university and acted as an independent educational organization ever since. The ICSS founded by a board of trustees consisting of prominent Iranian psychologists led by Prof. Kamal Kharazi.

In 2007, to develop cognitive sciences and technologies at the national level, the Supreme Council of Cultural Revolution, assigned Kharazi to draft a strategic report for the development of cognitive science and its related technologies. This task was carried out by a working group led by him and with the cooperation of a group of cognitive science professors, and it was approved by the Supreme Council in 2010 and announced by the then president. In addition, in 2013, the Supreme Council of Cultural Revolution, by approving the comprehensive scientific map of the country, named the field of cognitive sciences as an A-priority science for the country.

== Education ==
The institute offers various M.Sc. and PhD degrees related to cognition and cognitive studies which are:

M.Sc.: Cognitive Psychology; Mind, Brain, and Education; Cognitive Rehabilitation; Cognitive Design and Creativity; Cognitive Science and Media

PhD: Cognitive Neuroscience: Brain and Cognition; Cognitive Neuroscience: Computing and Artificial Intelligence; Cognitive Psychology; Psychology: Social Cognition; Cognitive Modeling; Philosophy of Mind; and Cognitive Linguistics.

Acceptance to the institute is competitive and entrance to its programs requires performing well in the Iranian University Entrance Exam.

== Research, laboratories, and departments ==
ICSS departments consist of: the Department of Psychology and Cognitive Rehabilitation; Department of Cognitive Education; Department of Cognitive Linguistics; Department of Cognitive Modeling; Department of Cognitive Neuroscience, Department of Computing and Artificial Intelligence; Department of Philosophy of Mind; Department of Design and Creativity; Department of Media.

The institute has these main laboratories:

- Animal Lab
- Neuropsychology Lab
- Animal Electrophysiology Lab
- Human Electrophysiology Lab
- ERP, EEG Lab
- TMS Lab
- EMG Lab
- Eye Tracking Lab
- Neural Data Analysis Lab
- fNIRS Lab
- Virtual Reality Lab

And two affiliated centres:

- Brain and Cognition Clinic (BCC)
- COGNOTECH

ICSS has a library devoted to publishing materials related to Cognitive Sciences.

In the process of research through cognition, ICSS pursues the following primary objectives: Discovery of important, unknown facts about key issues in cognitive science through quality experiments; understanding unresolved issues in cognitive science through the provision of new, effective, analytical theories; identifying means of employing achievements in cognitive science to improve the quality of individual and social wellbeing.

== Cooperations ==
The institute has had cooperations with many universities in The United States, Europe, Japan, South Korea, China, India, and Australia including, but not limited to, Kyoto University, University of Oxford, Yale University, The University of Queensland, Korea University, Seoul National University, KAIST, Lomonosov Moscow State University, University of Hyderabad, and Karolinska Institute. Also, ICSS has working relations with several United Nations agencies such as United Nations Economic and Social Council.

The institute also acts as an interuniversity organization having adjunct professors and invited lecturers from The University of Tehran, Kharazmi University, Amirkabir University of Technology, Allameh Tabatabai University, Shiraz University of Medical Sciences, K. N. Toosi University of Technology, and Shiraz University. The Institute also organizes its Media program jointly with the IRIB University.

== See also ==
- Cognitive science
- Artificial intelligence
- Philosophy of Mind
- Institute for Studies in Theoretical Physics and Mathematics (IPM)
- Shahid Beheshti University
- Higher Education in Iran
- List of universities in Iran
