= Interdisciplinary Social Science Research Center, Zhejiang University =

Research center at Zhejiang University, China

Interdisciplinary Social Science Research Center, also known as Interdisciplinary Center for Social Science (ICSS) (simplified Chinese: 浙江大学跨学科社会科学研究中心; traditional Chinese: 浙江大學跨學科社會科學研究中心) is an interdisciplinary research center in Zhejiang University.

== History ==
ICSS was founded on April 15, 2003, as an important platform, upon which Zhejiang University can make use of its comprehensive advantages in the multi-disciplines to carry out interdisciplinary research. In October, 2005 it has been listed as a major research orientation in the “Zhejiang University Language and Cognition Research”, the first group National Philosophy and Social Science Innovation Base (II type).

== Research Area ==
ICSS pursues the moral foundation of market society and explores the innate mechanism for the deepening of the society. Since its foundation, the interdisciplinary center has made remarkable academic achievements.

== Staff ==
=== Chairman of the academic council for ICSS ===
Professor Wang Dingding

=== Director of ICSS ===
Professor Ye Hang

=== Members of the academic council for ICSS (incomplete) ===
Wang Dingding, Herbert Gintis, Samuel Bowles, Shi Jinchuan, Luo Weidong

== Location ==
7th Floor, Main Teaching Building, Xixi Campus, Zhejiang University, Hangzhou, China.
