= Mohammad Jafar Mahallati =

Iranian scholar of Islamic studies

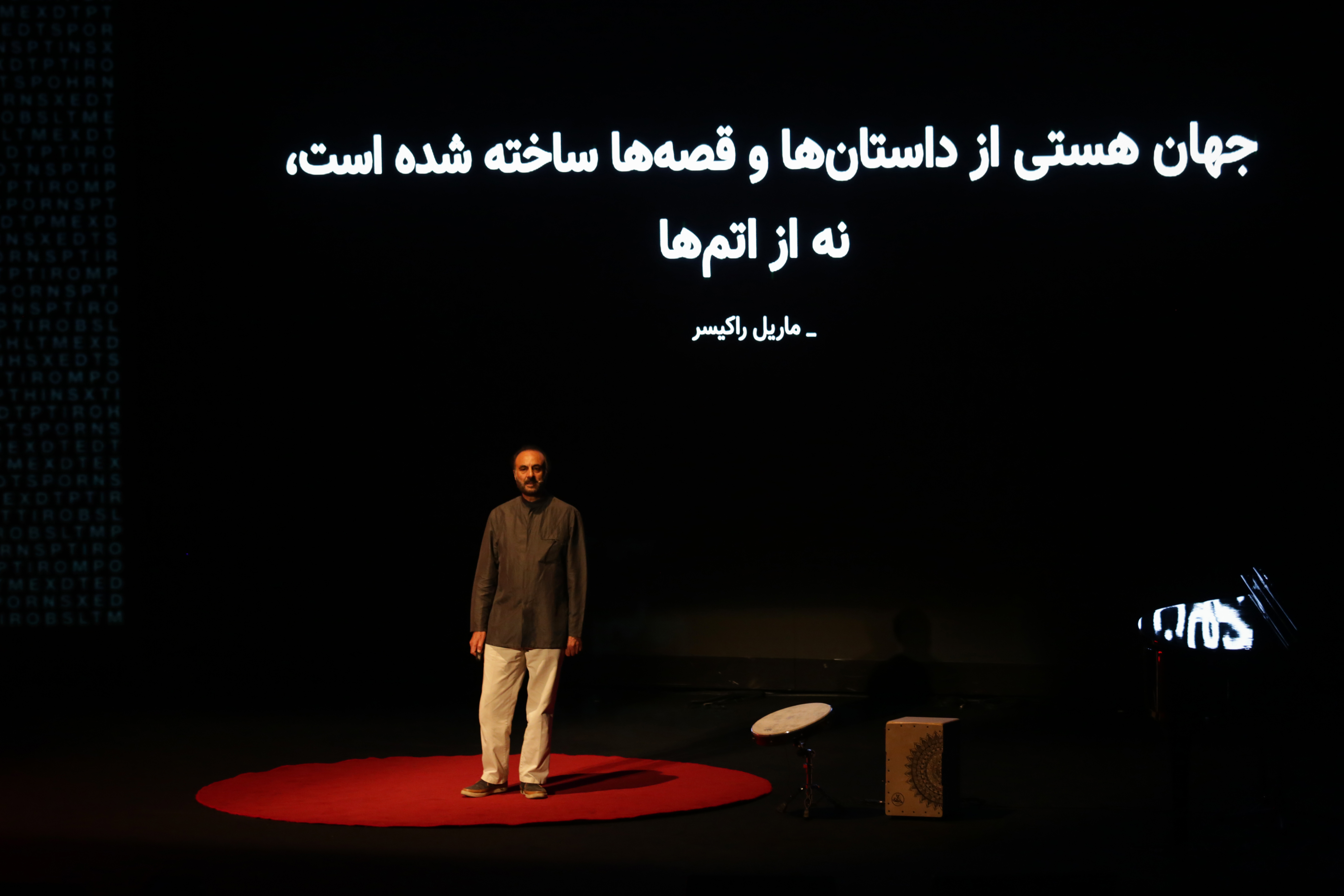
Mohammad Jafar Mahallati at TEDxTehran

Mohammad Jafar Mahallati (Persian: محمدجعفر محلاتی) is an Iranian scholar of Islamic studies and a former diplomat. He was formerly the Nancy Schrom Dye Chair in Middle East and North African Studies at Oberlin College in Oberlin, Ohio. He was Iran's ambassador and Permanent Representative to the United Nations from 1987 to 1989.

== Life ==
Born in Tehran, Mahallati initially studied economics at the National University of Iran and civil engineering at the University of Kansas in the US. Later, he obtained a master's in political economy from the University of Oregon and earned his PhD in Islamic studies from McGill University in Canada. Serving as the chair of the department of economics in Kerman University for a year, Mahallati became a diplomat and spent a decade working with the United Nations. He played a major role in adopting the Security Council Resolution 598 which brought the Iran-Iraq war to an end. Returning to his academic career, Mahallati taught at various institutions including Columbia, Princeton, Yale, and Georgetown. In 2007, he joined Oberlin College and is still serving as the Presidential Scholar in Islamic Studies and the Nancy Schrom Dye Chair in Middle East and North African Studies.

== Accusation ==
In 2017 Amnesty International published an investigation of the 1988 executions of Iranian political prisoners, documenting how Mahallati denied that Iran was conducting mass executions during his tenure as Permanent Representative to the United Nations. Instead, Mahallati claimed that the 1988 executions were "battlefield killings" and called the United Nations' resolution expressing concern over the matter "unjust" because it was based on "fake information" released by "a terrorist organization in Iraq."

On October 7, 2020, a group of former Iranian political prisoners and human rights activists sent a letter to the president of Oberlin College demanding that the college terminate Mahallati's employment. Referencing the Amnesty International report, the letter argued he intended to "obfuscate and lie to the international community about mass crimes perpetrated by the Iranian regime." On October 10, 2020, Mahallati responded to this allegation, saying, "The accusers fail to provide a single solid document as evidence of my actual knowledge of these incidents. With no concrete evidence, they infer that I must have been informed of and intentionally denied these atrocities. I categorically deny any knowledge and therefore responsibility regarding mass executions in Iran when I was serving at the United Nations."

To investigate the matter, Oberlin hired the law firm Greenberg Traurig to review Mahallati's case which came to the conclusion that there was no support to these accusations. On November 2, 2021, protestors demanded Oberlin provide "full transparency of (Mahallati's) criminal past" and graphically reenacted the Iranian trials on the college's campus.

In December 2023, Oberlin College placed Mahallati on indefinite leave following allegations that he ran a sex-for-grade scheme while previously teaching at Columbia University.

== Works ==
- Ethics of War and Peace in Iran and Shi'i Islam (University of Toronto Press, Scholarly Publishing Division, Nov 14, 2016)
- Friendship in Islamic Ethics and World Politics (the University of Michigan Press, 2019)
