= Mohammad Hadi Nejad Hosseinian =

Iranian politician

Mohammad Hadi Nejad Hosseinian (Persian: محمدهادی نژادحسینیان; born 1946 in Tehran), is the Deputy Prime Minister and Minister of Roads of Iran in the government of Seyed Ali Khamenei, the Minister of Heavy Industries (Oil) in the governments of Akbar Hashemi Rafsanjani and the former Permanent Representative of Iran to the United Nations.
