= Interests Section of Iran in the United States =

Coordinates: 38.906384433291315°N 77.05031215182414°W

Interest Section of the Islamic Republic of Iran in the United States دفتر حفاظت منافع جمهوری اسلامی ایران در واشنگتن دی‌سی
- Location: Embassy of Pakistan
- Address: 1250 23rd Street NW, Washington, DC 20037
- Opened: 1981
- Website: daftar.org

The Interests Section of the Islamic Republic of Iran in the United States (Persian: دفتر حفاظت منافع جمهوری اسلامی ایران در آمریکا) is a part of the Pakistani Embassy in Washington, D.C., and is the de facto diplomatic and consular representation of the Islamic Republic of Iran in the United States.

The Iranian Interest Section has several departments, including a passport department, civil registration, student section, legal, and visa section. Due to Iran's strict citizenship laws regarding the recognition of foreign nationalities, many individuals of Iranian descent born in the U.S. must obtain an Iranian passport from the Interest Section in order to travel to their homeland, even for a short visit. Visas are not issued to people of Iranian descent, and they are required to travel to Iran on an Iranian passport, even if not born in Iran.

== History ==
Iranian students seized the U.S. Embassy in Tehran during the 1979 Iranian Revolution, leading to the breaking of diplomatic relations between Iran and the United States. As part of the Algiers Accords of 1981, the two countries agreed to establish "interests sections" to look after their interests in the other country. Each country picked a third country, which had friendly relations with both sides, to be its protecting power in the other capital.

The Iranian embassy was seized by the U.S. State Department in retaliation for Iran's seizure of the U.S. Embassy in Tehran. As a result, the Iranian Interests Section operated out of a small office on Wisconsin Avenue associated with the Pakistani Embassy between 1981 and 2015. It has since relocated to a larger office space on 23rd Street NW, near D.C.'s Washington Circle.

Algeria originally served as Iran's protecting power in the U.S. However, when Iranian leaders expressed support for the Islamic Salvation Front in January 1992, Algeria refused to continue serving as Iran's protecting power. In March 1992, Pakistan agreed to undertake a mandate as Iran's protecting power in the U.S.

According to the Iranian Ministry of Foreign Affairs, between 60 and 65 Iranians are employed at this office. In 2003, the Iranian Interest Section in Washington, D.C. reported maintaining passport records for approximately 900,000 Iranians residing in the United States, many of whom were born in the US. It is believed that this number is expected to be much larger today.

In February 2016, Representatives Mike Pompeo, Lee Zeldin, and Frank LoBiondo visited the Iranian Interests Section in Washington to apply for visas to travel to Iran to visit an imprisoned American. However, their visa requests were denied.

The Iranian Interest Section is tasked with issuing Iranian passports, Iranian ID cards, and Shenasnameh to all Iranians and their children living in the United States and Canada. The Section is also equipped to handle various other consular matters, including the translation of birth certificates, Iranian driver's licenses, registering marriage and divorce, and powers of attorney.

Since 2019, the Interest Section has been open in person only two days a week, Tuesdays and Thursdays, due to the large volume of mail consular requests received from approximately 1.5 million Iranians in the United States and Canada. As the sole consular mission of the Islamic Republic of Iran in the United States, the Section dedicated the rest of the week to handling these requests.

In September 2023, Iran's Minister of Foreign Affairs, Hossein Amir-Abdollahian, requested to visit Washington to review the Iranian Interest Section following the United Nations General Assembly in New York. However, the U.S. denied the request, restricting him to the few blocks around the United Nations in New York.

Following the death of Iranian President Raisi helicopter crash, Pakistani Ambassador to the U.S. Masood Khan visited the Iranian Interest Section to express his condolences.

After the January 2025 California wildfires, the Interests Section announced via the official Telegram channel that it would provide free replacement passports and official documents to all Iranians affected by the disaster in California.

== Directors of the Interests Section ==
As agreed in the Algiers Accords of 1981, the director is the sole Iranian diplomat at the Section. The rest of the employees are the clerical staff. The director is chosen by the Iranian Ministry of Foreign Affairs.

- Mr. Faramarz Fathnezhad (1996–2000)
- Mr. Fariborz Jahansoozan (2000–2005)
- Mr. Ali Jazini Dorcheh (2005–2010)
- Mr. Mostafa Rahmani (2010–2015)
- Mr. Mehdi Atefat (2015–present)

As the sole Iranian diplomat, the director holds diplomatic immunity as recognized under international law.

== Controversies ==
=== Threats against the Iranian diaspora and anti-regime critics ===
During the local protests by the local Iranian diaspora against a memorial to Raisi and to the Iranian Foreign Minister, a man who turned out to be an employee of the Iranian Special Interests Section of the Embassy of Pakistan made death threat gestures towards the demonstrators. The staffer, Ramezan Soltan-Mohammadi, has received a temporary restraining order from the Maryland court system that prevents him from coming close to at least one protest leader's home and workplace. A group composed of members of the diaspora has taken him to court, and the case is ongoing. He was then recalled back to Iran in August 2024 by the Iranian Ministry of Foreign Affairs.

The incident occurred just days before the incident in London where protesters against a similar memorial event there came under attack by attendees of the ceremony, allegedly by IRGC agents loyal to the regime.

== Interests Section of the U.S. in Iran ==
The U.S. Interests Section in Tehran has been operating under the Swiss Embassy since 1980. Services for American citizens are limited. The section is not authorized to perform any U.S. visa/green card/immigration-related services. Contrary to usual practice, the old U.S. embassy complex was not handed over to the Swiss. Instead, part of the embassy has been turned into an anti-American museum, while the rest has become student organizations' offices.

As of 2024, U.S. visa/green card services and interviews for Iranian citizens are conducted at U.S. Embassies and Consulates in other locations, namely Ankara, Turkey, Dubai, United Arab Emirates, and Yerevan, Armenia, which accordingly are staffed with Persian-speaking consular officers.

== See also ==
- Former Embassy of Iran in Washington, D.C.
- Iran–United States relations
- Foreign relations of Iran
- List of ambassadors of Iran to the United States
- Cuban Interests Section, now an embassy
