= Identity documents in Iran =

General list of Iranian identity documents

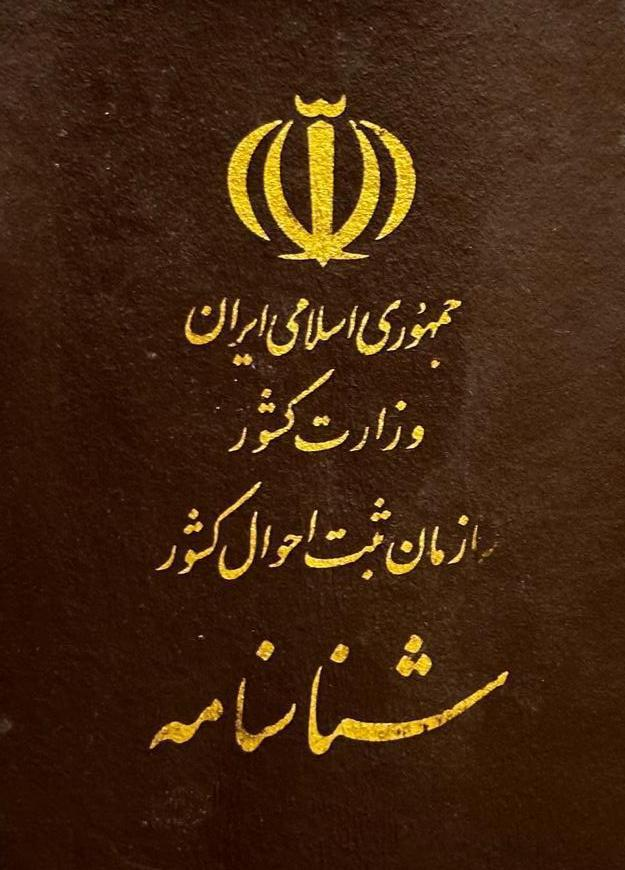
Iranian identity booklet

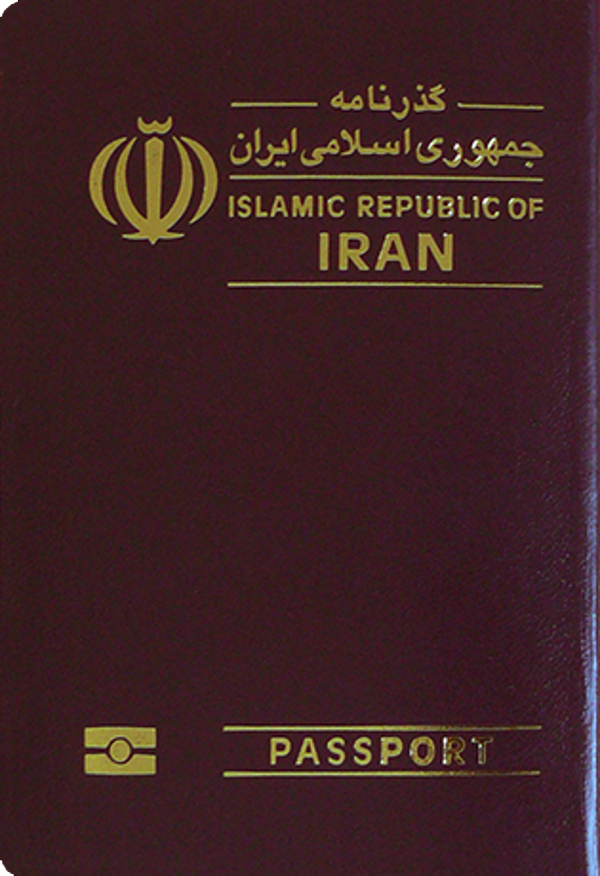
Iranian Biometric Passport

Identity documents in Iran are official documents of Iranians identity and citizenship and are used to identification and authentication. The most important identity documents in Iran are the Iranian identity booklet (Persian: شناسنامه) and the Iranian identity card (Persian: کارت ملی). Identity documents for foreign nationals are resident card and employment card.

== List of identity documents ==
Document	The issuer
Iranian identity card	National Organization for Civil Registration of Iran
Iranian identity booklet	National Organization for Civil Registration of Iran
Driving licence in Iran	Iranian Traffic Police
Iranian passport	Iranian Immigration & Passport Police Office

== Postal code in Iran ==
Postal codes are used to identify specific locations. In Iran, the postal code is a 10-digit number, the first 5 digits representing the departure code (characteristic of the destination city) and the second 5 digits representing the distribution code (location characteristic of the destination). Its main use is to send letters or postal packages sent by the Iran Post Company. There are currently about 52 million different postcodes in Iran.

Postal code in Iran is issued by the General Geographical and Spatial Administration of the country under the supervision of the National Post Company.

The plan to allocate and use the 10-digit postal code was included in the agenda of the Government and the Islamic Consultative Assembly of Iran in 1991. Therefore, during a 5-year period, from 1991 to 1996, they began to collect statistics and informations, and in 1997, they announced 10-digit postal codes for all Iranian places and households.

== Law of the allocation of national number and postal code ==
Map of two-digit postal code areas in Iran

In 1997, the law requiring the allocation of national numbers and postal codes to all Iranian citizens was approved:

- Article 1 - The Ministries of Post, Telegraph and Telephone are obliged to assign national numbers and postal codes to all Iranian citizens in accordance with the laws and regulations.
- Article 2 - All natural and legal persons, ministries, organizations, companies and government-affiliated institutions, universities, banks, municipalities, institutions of the Islamic Revolution and the Islamic Republic of Iran Armed Forces whose inclusion in the law requires mentioning the person's name, they are obliged to follow and use the national number and ten-digit postal code, which will be allocated by the National Organization for Civil Registration of Iran in the form of an identification card and in cooperation with the National Post Company to identify individuals and their place of work or residence.
- Article 3 - The card mentioned in the above article is a document identifying Iranian citizens and is subject to all relevant legal and criminal provisions and must always be with its owner.
  - Note: If the cardholder changes his / her place of residence or work, he / she must inform the National Organization for Civil Registration as soon as possible.
- Article 4 - Issuance of any administrative or trade union identification card or driver's license and the like, without entering the national number and postal code is prohibited.
  - Note: Identity cards of administrative, trade union or driver's license and the like, which were issued before the approval and implementation of this law, will be valid until the conditions for their replacement in a new form are provided.
- Article 5 - The government is obliged to anticipate the costs of implementing the national number and postal code plan in the budget of the relevant executive bodies.
- Article 6 - The executive by-law of this law will be prepared by the Ministries, Post, Telegraph and Telephone within 2 months and will be approved by the Cabinet.

== See also ==
- Multi-factor authentication
- List of passports
