= Iranian identity booklet =

One of the Iranian identity documents

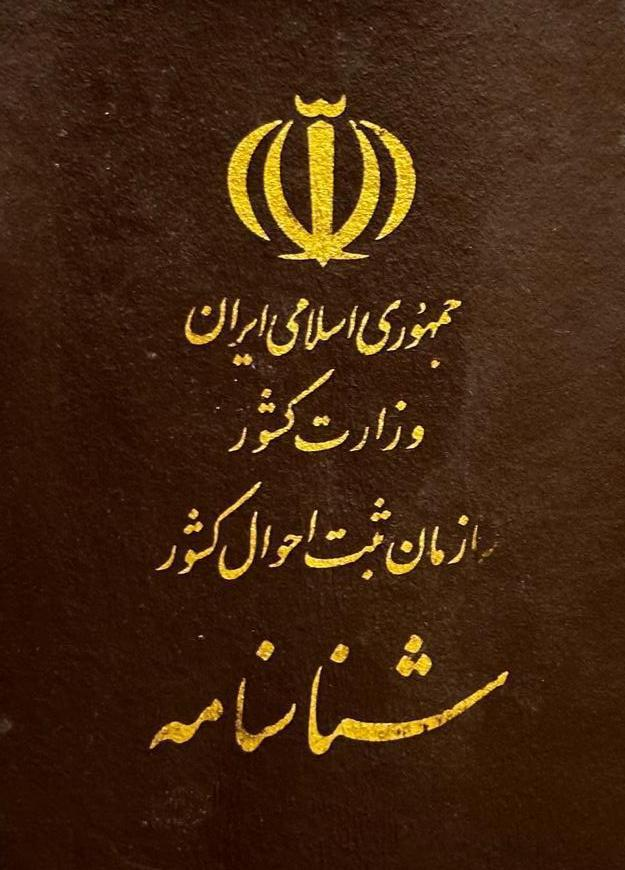
- Type: National identity document
- Issued by: Iran, National Organization for Civil Registration of Iran
- First issued: 25 December 1918
- Eligibility: At birth
- Expiration: No expiration date

The Iranian identity booklet, also known as the Shenasnameh (Persian: شناسنامه, lit. 'Writ of Identity'), is one of the identity documents issued in Iran. This identity document is in booklet format and issued to Iranian citizens at birth. The National Organization for Civil Registration of Iran is obliged to issue an identity booklet to every Iranian citizen.

Iranian citizens have two identity documents, namely the Iranian identity card, which contains the holder's national identity number, and the identity booklet, which contains more information.

To participate in elections in Iran, voters must present their identity booklet.

According to the Civil Registration Reform Law approved on 8 January 1985 in Iran, the cover and the first page of the identity booklet are adorned with the emblem of Iran.

== History ==
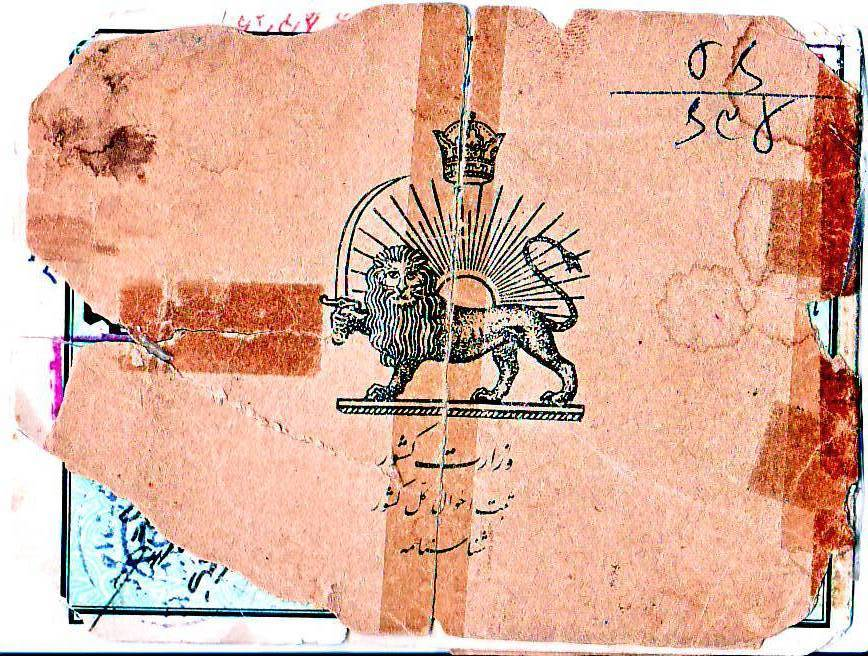
Cover of identity booklet, Pahlavi era

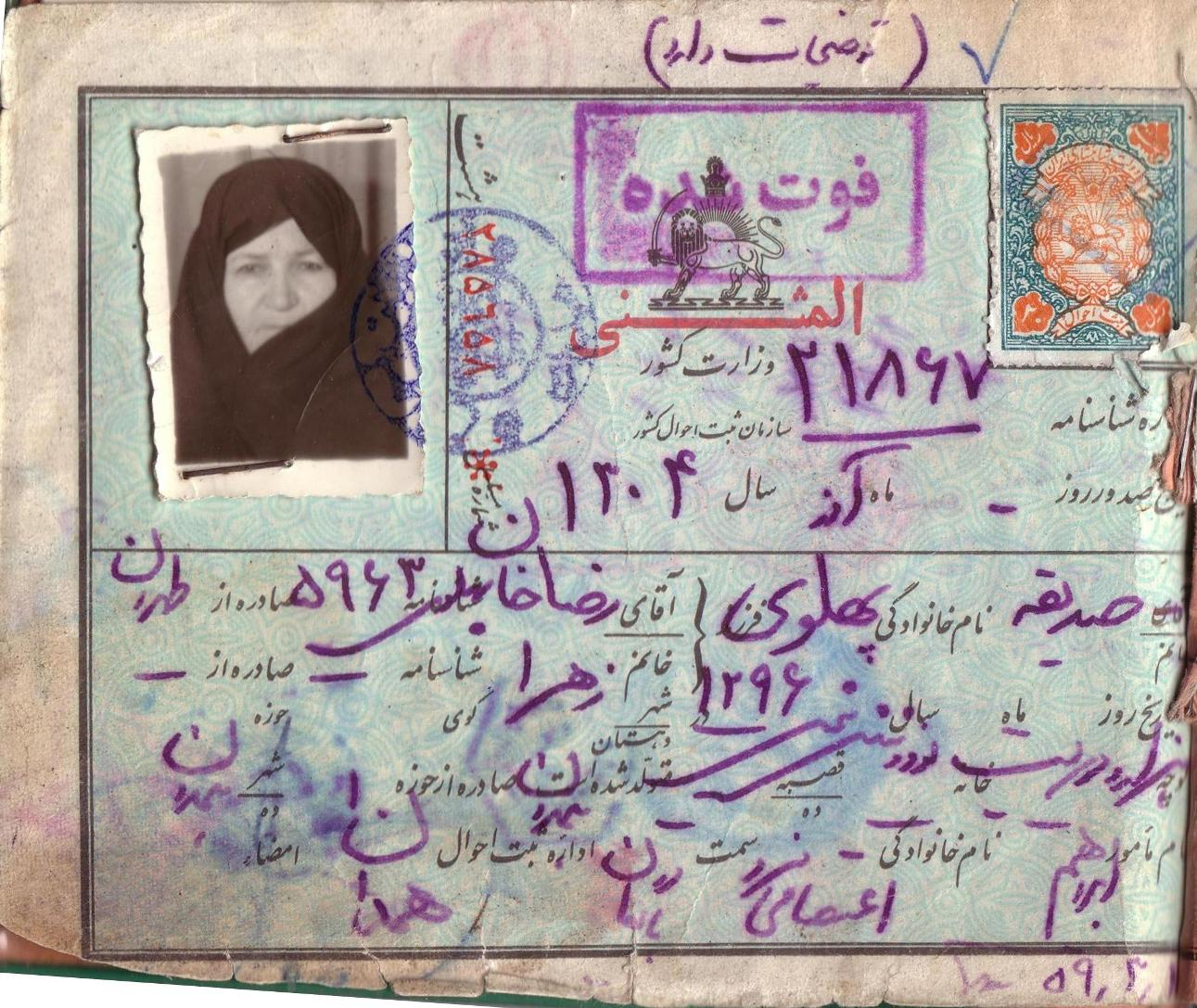
First page of identity booklet, Pahlavi era

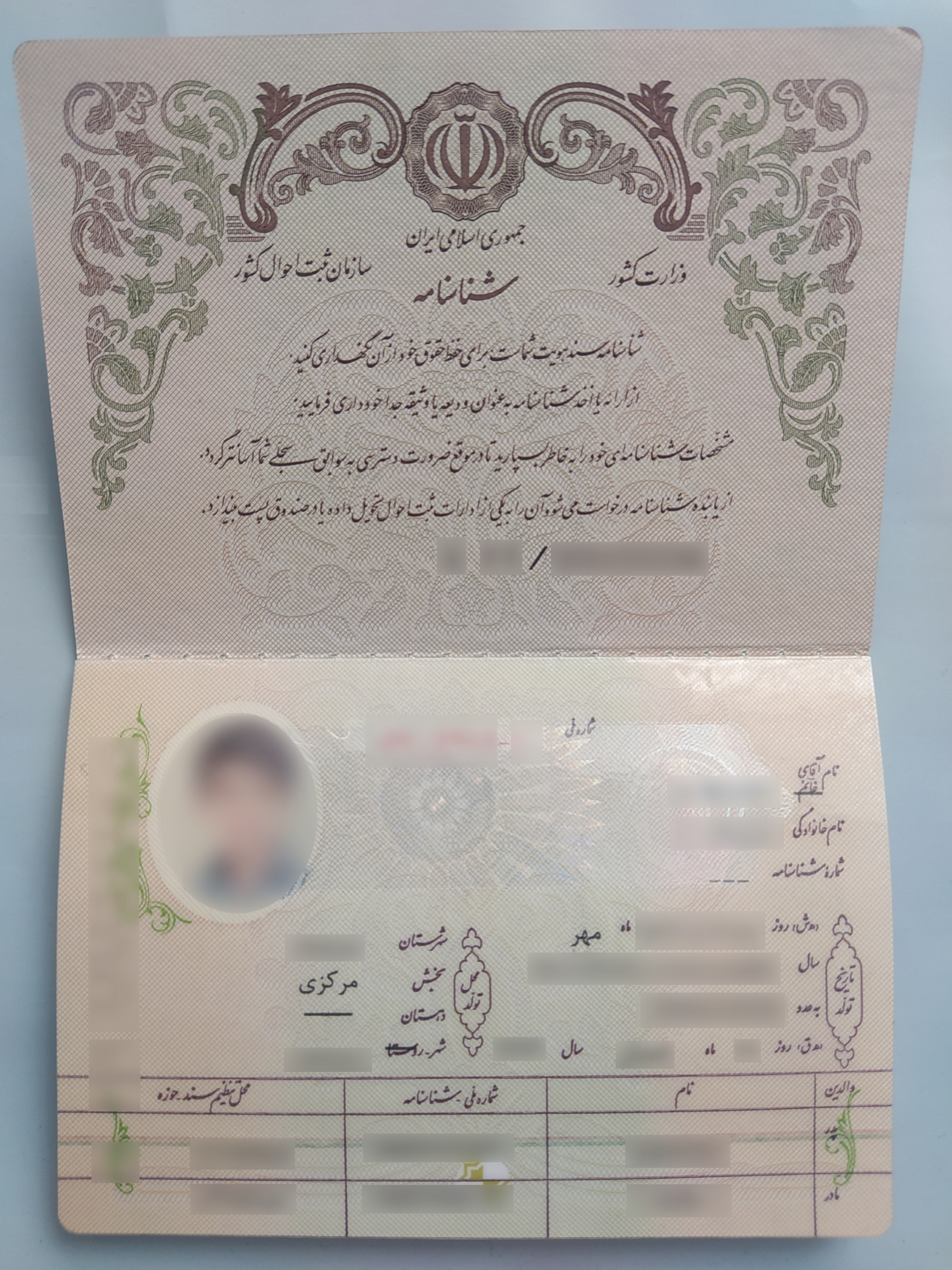
Iranian identity booklet inside theme (Islamic republic era)

According to the decision of the Iran's Cabinet of Ministers on 12 December 1918 during the Qajar era, the regulations for the establishment of the Civil Registry Office in the Ministry of Interior were prepared. The first Iranian identity booklet (then called sejel (Persian: سجل)) was issued on 25 December 1918 for a newborn girl named "Fatemeh Irani". In honour of this, the third day of Dey (23 or 24 December) has been named National Organization for Civil Registration Day in Iran.

From March 1925, according to the law, obtaining identity booklet was required for all Iranian citizens in the areas where the Civil Registry Office was established.

== The identity booklet information ==
Each Iranian identity booklet must contain the following information:

=== Information about the holder ===
- Name, Surname and Gender
- Scanned photograph of the holder's face
- Identity booklet number
- National Identity Number
- Birth date: day, month and year in format of Solar Hijri calendar and Islamic calendar
- Place of birth: County, District, Administrative division, City, Village
- Father's name and mother's name
- National identity number or identity booklet number of parents
- Place of birth of parents
- Special field for registration of marriage and divorce and details about Spouse
- Special field for children's names and specifications
- Special field for registration of the holder's death

=== Document information ===
- Consecutive and series number of the booklet
- Date of document preparation: day, month and year in format of Solar Hijri calendar
- Document preparation location: Area, County, District, Administrative division, City, Village
- Name and surname of the document regulator; Signature of the issuing officer and stamp of the office
- Special field for description (such as renaming)
- Special field for multiplying stamps (such as the stamp of participation in Election)

== Multiplying stamps ==
According to the Civil Registry law of Iran, only the following institutions are allowed to stamp on the identity booklet:

- National Organization for Civil Registration of Iran
- Marriage and divorce notaries offices
- Embassies of Iran in other countries
- Identification administration of the Law Enforcement Force of the Islamic Republic of Iran
- Interpol
- General Election Administration of the Ministry of Interior

== Elimination of spouse name ==
Under certain conditions, it is possible to eliminate a spouse's name after divorce.

== Replacement ==
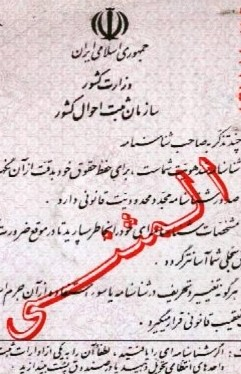
'Duplicate' stamp (in red), Islamic republic era

When a replacement copy of an identity booklet is issued, the centre of each new page is stamped with the word "duplicate" (Persian: المثنی, almosana) and a new date of issue is indicated.

== Invalidation ==
The identity booklet is revoked in two conditions: one is renunciation of Iranian nationality law and the other is death.

== See also ==
- Iranian identity card
- Driving licence in Iran
- Iranian passport
- Tajik passport (Shinosnoma, Tajik for Shenasnameh)
- Identity documents in Iran

== Bibliography ==
- Council of Europe. Committee of Ministers (2005). Identity and Travel Documents and the Fight Against Terrorism: Recommendation Rec(2005)7.
- Jane Caplan, John C. Torpey (2001). Documenting Individual Identity: The Development of State Practices in the Modern World. Princeton University
