= Visa policy of Iran =

Policy on permits required to enter Iran

Visitors to Iran must obtain an e-Visa unless they are citizens from one of the visa-exempt countries or countries that are ineligible for an e-Visa, in which case they must obtain a visa in advance from one of the Iranian diplomatic missions around the world.

Travellers arriving in Iran must hold passports that are valid for at least 6 months beyond the intended period of stay.

== Overview ==
Dual citizens of both Iran and another country count as citizens of Iran when entering Iran, and hence must hold an Iranian passport upon arrival.

Iran no longer affixes visas to passports nor stamps them on entry for most nationalities as a response to the US sanctions on persons who have visited Iran after 2011.

In November 2018, the head of Iran's Cultural Heritage, Handicrafts, and Tourism Organization (ICHTO) announced that the country will no longer stamp or put stickers to passports of foreign tourists (except US, Canada and UK visitors) in a bid to ease their concerns about traveling to other countries after leaving Iran.

In June 2019, the President of Iran ordered the Interior Ministry to implement the decision on not stamping passports of foreigners.

== Visa policy map ==
Visa policy of Iran Iran Visa not required Visa not required for tour groups / eVisa Visa on arrival / eVisa eVisa Visa required Admission refused

== Visa exemption ==
=== Ordinary passports ===
Citizens of the following countries and territories may enter Iran without a visa for business or tourist purposes for the following period (unless otherwise noted):

90 days

- Turkey

90 days within any 6 months

- Armenia
- Oman
- Syria (Note: Must enter Iran by air to qualify for visa exemption.)

45 days

- Georgia

30 days

- Iraq

30 days within any 90 days

- Tajikistan

21 days

- China (Note: For Chinese citizens with People's Republic of China passports, Hong Kong Special Administrative Region passports or Macau Special Administrative Region passports only.)
- Hong Kong
- Macau

20 days

- Egypt

15 days

- Venezuela (Note: Extension of stay is possible for an additional 15 days.)

15 days within any 6 months (Note: For tourist purposes only.)

- Gulf Cooperation Council member states (except Oman)

- Belarus
- Bosnia and Herzegovina
- Brazil
- Brunei
- Cambodia
- Croatia
- Cuba
- Indonesia
- Japan
- Kyrgyzstan
- Lebanon
- Mauritania
- Mauritius
- Mexico
- Peru
- Serbia
- Seychelles
- Singapore
- Tanzania
- Tunisia
- Uzbekistan
- Vietnam
- Zimbabwe

14 days

- Azerbaijan
- Kazakhstan
- Malaysia

- Russia
Citizens of Russia travelling in a tour group (comprising between 5 and 50 people) together with a representative of the tour group operator may also enter Iran without a visa, for a maximum stay of 90 days within any 180 days.

Date of visa changes
- 1 February 2010: Azerbaijan
- 29 July 2015: Egypt, Georgia, Lebanon, Syria and Turkey
- 10 August 2016: Armenia
- 1 November 2017: Serbia
- 21 July 2019: China, Hong Kong and Macau
- 24 October 2019: Iraq (was canceled between December 27, 2019 and October 2021)
- 11 November 2022: Kazakhstan
- 4 February 2024: Bahrain, Belarus, Bosnia and Herzegovina, Brazil, Brunei, Cambodia, Croatia, Cuba, India, Indonesia, Japan, Kuwait, Kyrgyzstan, Mauritania, Mauritius, Mexico, Peru, Qatar, Saudi Arabia, Serbia (resumed), Seychelles, Singapore, Tanzania, Tunisia, United Arab Emirates, Uzbekistan, Vietnam and Zimbabwe
- 10 August 2024: Tajikistan
- 18 May 2025: Lebanon (resumed)

Cancelled:

- 17 October 2018: Serbia (resumed in February 2024)
- 27 December 2019: Iraq (resumed in October 2021)
- 22 November 2025: India
- 3 May 2026: Lebanon

==== Iran free trade zones ====
All tourists may stay on Kish Island, Qeshm Island, or other free trade zones for 14 days or less without obtaining any visa. Americans; with the exception of Puerto Rico, U.S. Virgin Islands, and Guam; Canadians, and Britons are required to have a certified escort guide waiting for them upon arrival, and they must obtain hotel reservations before arrival. Tourists may stay at the following trade zones for up to 2 weeks without a visa in 2022:

- Arvand Free Zone
- Aras Free Zone
- Chabahar Free Trade-Industrial Zone
- Maku, Iran
- Qeshm Island
- Kish Island
- Anzali

=== Non-ordinary passports ===
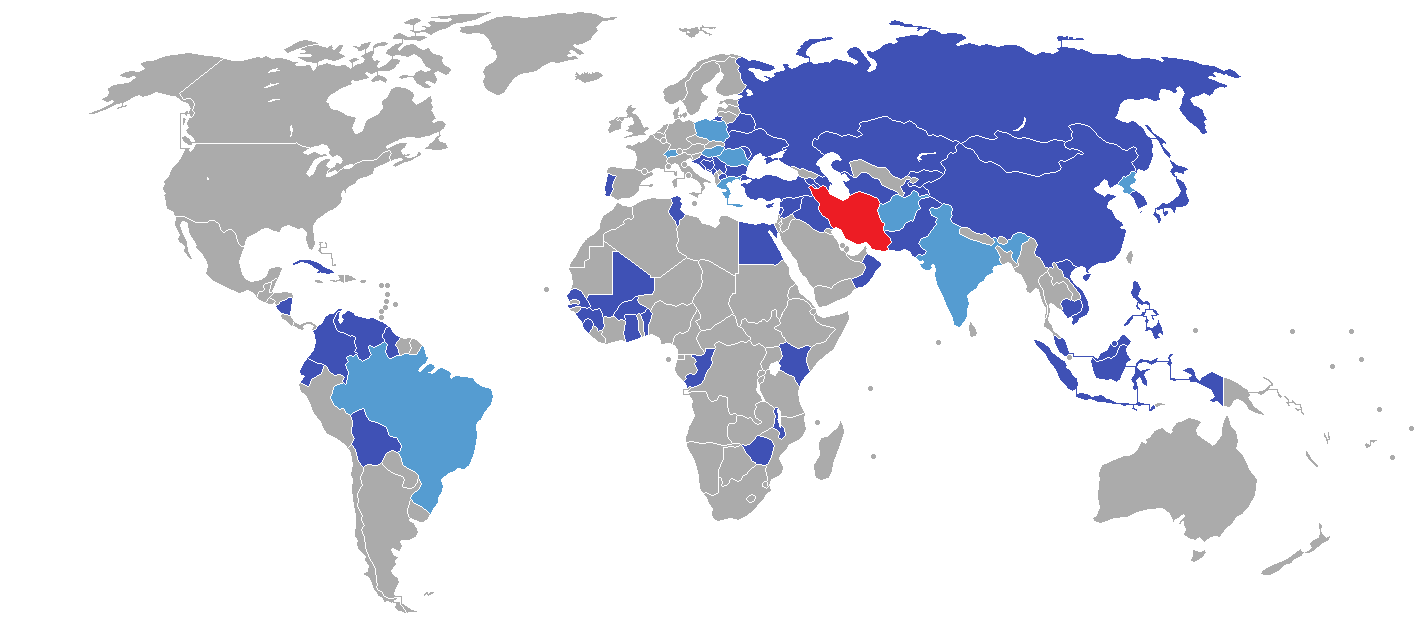
Visa policy of Iran for diplomatic, official or service passport holders Iran Visa not required for holders of diplomatic or service passports Visa not required for diplomatic passports only

Holders of non-ordinary passports of the following countries may enter Iran without a visa for the following period:

90 days

- Armenia^{D}
- Cuba^{D S}
- Ecuador^{D S}
- Portugal^{D Sp}

3 months

- Congo^{D S}
- Cyprus^{D S}
- Greece^{D}
- Japan^{D O}
- Pakistan^{D O}
- South Korea^{D S}
- Turkey^{D S}

60 days

- Bolivia^{D S}

2 months

- Nicaragua^{D S}
- Poland^{D}

45 days

- Iraq^{D S}

30 days

- Albania^{D S}
- Belarus^{D O}
- Benin^{D S}
- Brunei^{D O}
- Cambodia^{D S}
- Ghana^{D S}
- Kazakhstan^{D S}
- Lebanon^{D S}
- Montenegro^{D S}
- North Korea^{D}
- Oman^{D O S Sp}
- Philippines^{D S}
- Russia^{D S}
- Serbia^{D S}
- Syria^{D O S Sp}
- Ukraine^{D S}
- Vietnam^{D O}
- Zimbabwe^{D S}

1 month

- Afghanistan^{D}
- Azerbaijan^{D S}
- Bosnia and Herzegovina^{D S}
- Brazil^{D}
- Bulgaria^{D S}
- Burkina Faso^{D S}
- China^{D S}
- Colombia^{D S}
- Croatia^{D S}
- Guinea^{D S}
- Guyana^{D S}
- Hungary^{D}
- India^{D}
- Kenya^{D S}
- Kyrgyzstan^{D S}
- Malawi^{D S}
- Mali^{D S}
- Moldova^{D S}
- North Macedonia^{D S}
- Romania^{D}
- Senegal^{D S}
- Sierra Leone^{D S}
- Switzerland^{D}
- Tajikistan^{D S}
- Tunisia^{D S}
- Turkmenistan^{D S}
- Venezuela^{D S}

20 days

- Egypt^{D S}

15 days

- Malaysia^{D S}

14 days

- Indonesia^{D S}

_{D - Diplomatic passports}
_{O - Official passports}
_{S - Service passports}
_{Sp - Special passports}

== Visa on arrival ==
On May 4, 2026, the Iranian Embassy in Lebanon announced on X that citizens of Lebanon require a visa to enter Iran. Therefore, they must obtain a visa upon arrival at all of Iran's borders.

The visa fee for a visit for tourism purposes is 10 EUR, and for a visit for religious purposes it is 20 EUR.

Also, citizens of Lebanon may apply for an e-Visa.

== Electronic visa (e-Visa) ==
Citizens of other countries must apply an e-Visa on the basis of which a visa on arrival will be issued for a maximum of 30 days Extension of stay is possible twice for 30 days for a total of up to 90 days.

e-Visa does not apply to Citizens of Afghanistan, Bangladesh, Canada, Colombia, Jordan, Pakistan, Somalia, United Kingdom and United States.

Shahid Rajaee Port

Marine travelers entering Iran via Shahid Rajaee Port in the southern Hormozgan Province can also receive a visa on arrival.

== Visa required in advance ==
Citizens of the following countries are ineligible for an e-Visa, and thus must obtain a visa in advance at an Iranian embassy or consulate:

- Afghanistan
- Bangladesh
- Canada
- Colombia
- Jordan
- Pakistan
- Somalia
- United Kingdom
- United States

=== Prior approval required ===
Holders of American, British, Canadian and Colombian passports can also visit Iran with an Iran tourism visa.

The visa procedure for these nationalities takes around 8 weeks. They also have to plan and book their trip with a certified local travel agency in Iran.

Before the visa can be issued, the agency has to submit the applicant's day-by-day itinerary to the foreign ministry for approval. American and Canadian spouses of Iranian Citizens can obtain family visas of up to 90 days to visit and stay in the country without the need for an agency. Passports of the above-mentioned citizens will also be stamped with a sticker visa and entry/exit stamps.

== Visa application and requirements ==
Iran's tourist visa is issued for up to 30 days and can have up to two additional 30-day extensions, for a total of 90 days.

To get a visa before arrival, a Visa Authorization Code must be applied for through the Iranian Ministry of Foreign Affair's e-visa website or an Iranian travel agency. The amount of the visa fee is dependent upon one's nationality. The visa fee must be paid prior to pick-up or when applying for a VOA. Local Iranian travel agencies offer better support, trackability and convenience for an additional fee.

Upon receiving a Visa Authorization Code, the visa may be collected at one of Iran's worldwide embassies and consulates prior to arrival or upon arrival at one of Iran's international airports.

Most nationalities, except American, British and Canadian passport holders, can also obtain their tourist visa upon their arrival in the form of a Visa-on-arrival (VOA) at the airport without a prior application. Although this method is convenient for last-minute travelers, it does have a higher risk of rejection and tends to be more time-consuming.

== History ==
=== September 2025 Visa Policy Update ===
In September 2025, the Iranian Ministry of Foreign Affairs revised its August 2025 visa policy, clarifying that the new restrictions apply only to citizens of European countries, Australia, New Zealand, the United States, the United Kingdom, and Canada. Under these regulations, travelers from the affected countries must visit Iran as part of a guided tour organized through a registered travel agency. Independent travel without a licensed guide is no longer permitted. Applicants are also required to submit a “resume file” containing travel history, educational background, employment details, and social media accounts, along with a signed tour contract and fixed itinerary that includes pre-booked accommodations. Visa processing takes approximately two to three weeks, excluding weekends and national holidays. The policy does not affect citizens of visa-exempt countries, who may continue to enter Iran without a visa, provided they do not overstay and they stay in licensed accommodations.

=== October 2025 Revision of Iran Visa Policy ===
Starting October 2025, the Iran visa process has returned to its previous, more flexible format. Most travelers can once again apply for their visas through registered Iranian travel agencies and travel independently across the country. This marks a major shift from the stricter temporary measures introduced earlier this year.

While travelers still need to provide a rough travel plan when applying for their visa, they now have much more freedom to adjust their itineraries after arrival. However, all tourists are still required to stay in registered hotels or guesthouses, as staying with locals or using unregistered private hosts remains prohibited under the current Iran travel regulations.

Citizens of the United States, the United Kingdom, and Canada must still book a pre-arranged guided tour through an authorized agency, in accordance with the Ministry of Foreign Affairs’ policies.

== Admission restrictions ==
=== Mandatory guides ===
Citizens of Canada, the United Kingdom and the United States are required to be escorted by a government-approved guide at all times. Independent travel for these citizens has been banned due to the closure of Iranian foreign missions in these countries.

=== Israel ===
Entry and transit is refused for citizens of Israel, even if not leaving the aircraft and proceeding by the same flight. Entry and transit is also refused to holders of passports or travel documents containing an Israeli visa or stamp (less than 365 days) or any data showing that the visitor has been to Israel or has indication of any connection with the state of Israel.

== See also ==
- Visa requirements for Iranian citizens
- Tourism in Iran
