= Driving licence in Iran =

Iranian Driving license
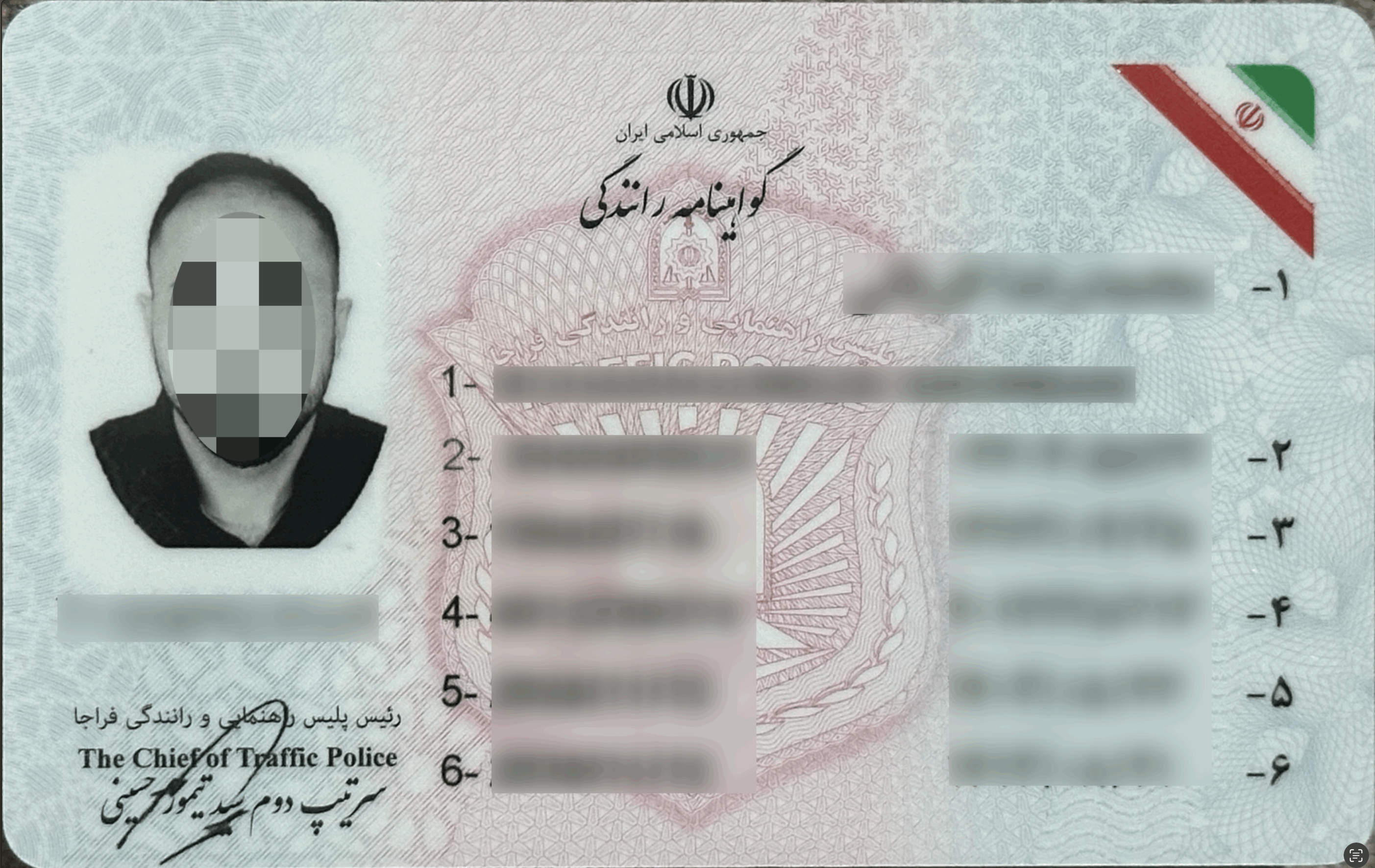
- Driving license - Front

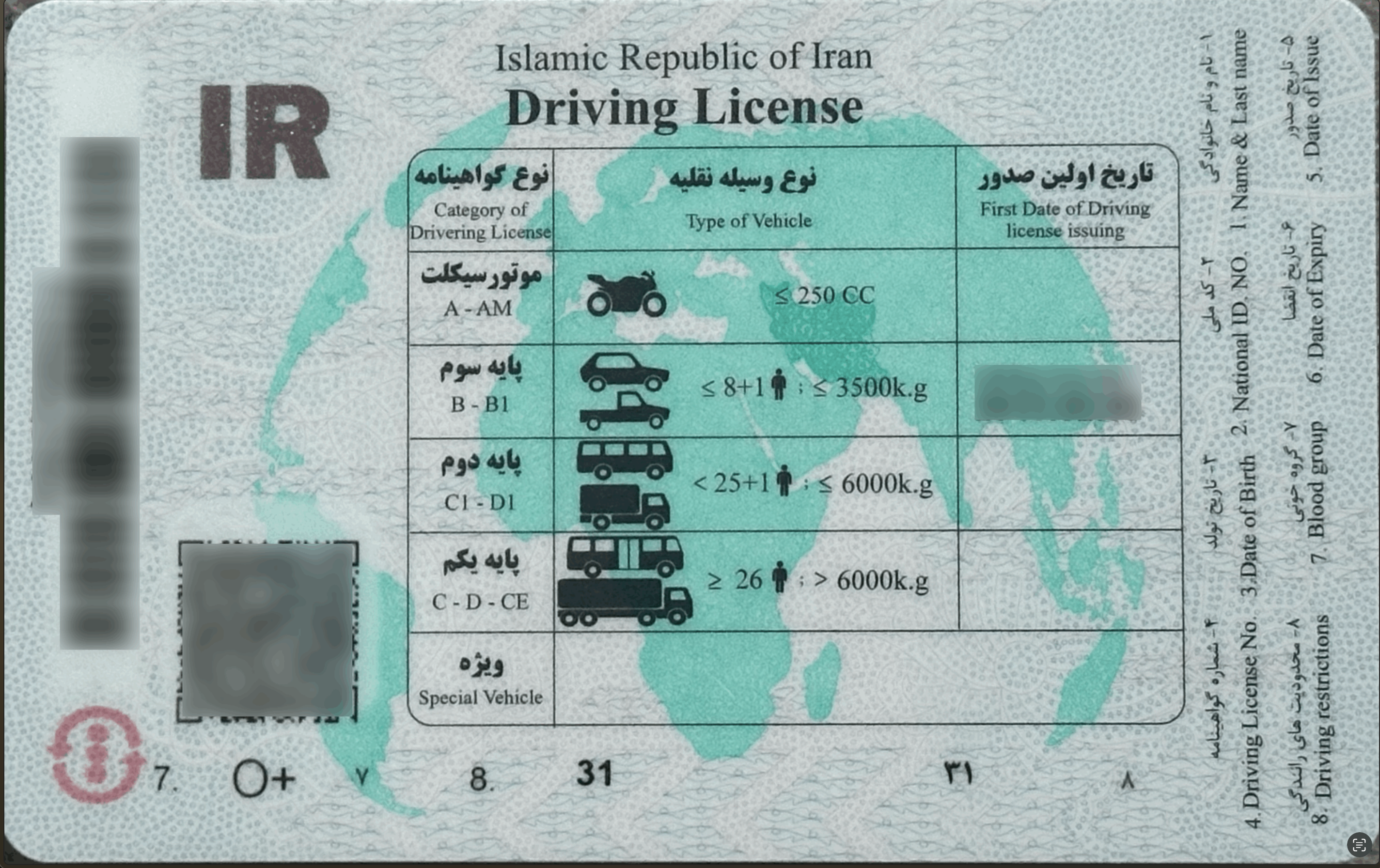
- Driving license - back
- Type: Driving licence
- Issued by: Iran
- Eligibility: 18 years old
- Expiration: 10 years

Driving licence in Iran (Persian: گواهی‌نامه رانندگی) is a document issued by the relevant government agency, regional or local security force, confirming the rights of the holder to drive motor vehicles.

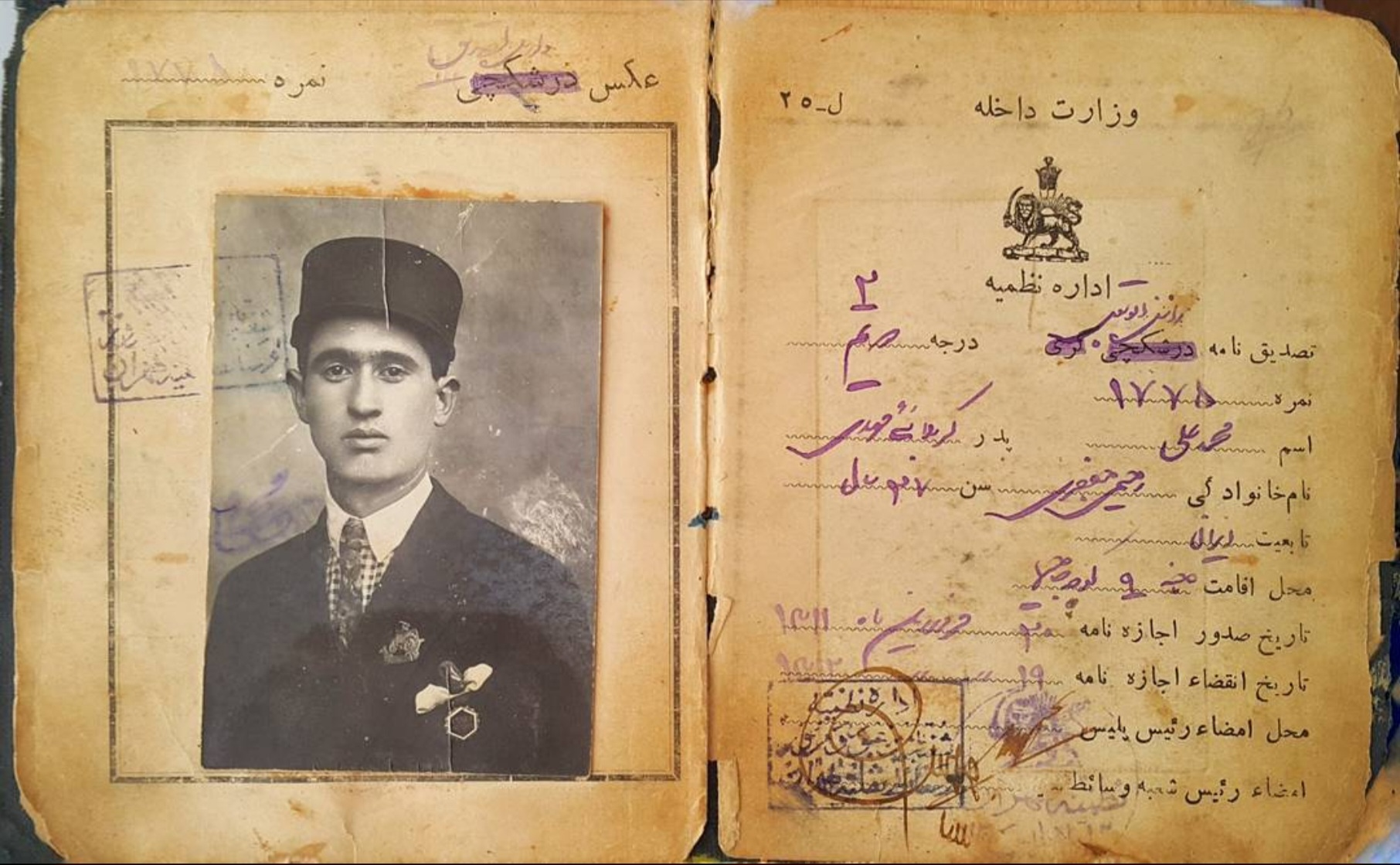
Iranian driver’s license issued in 1934, belonging to Mohammad Ali Rahimi Jafari, one of the first drivers in Iran

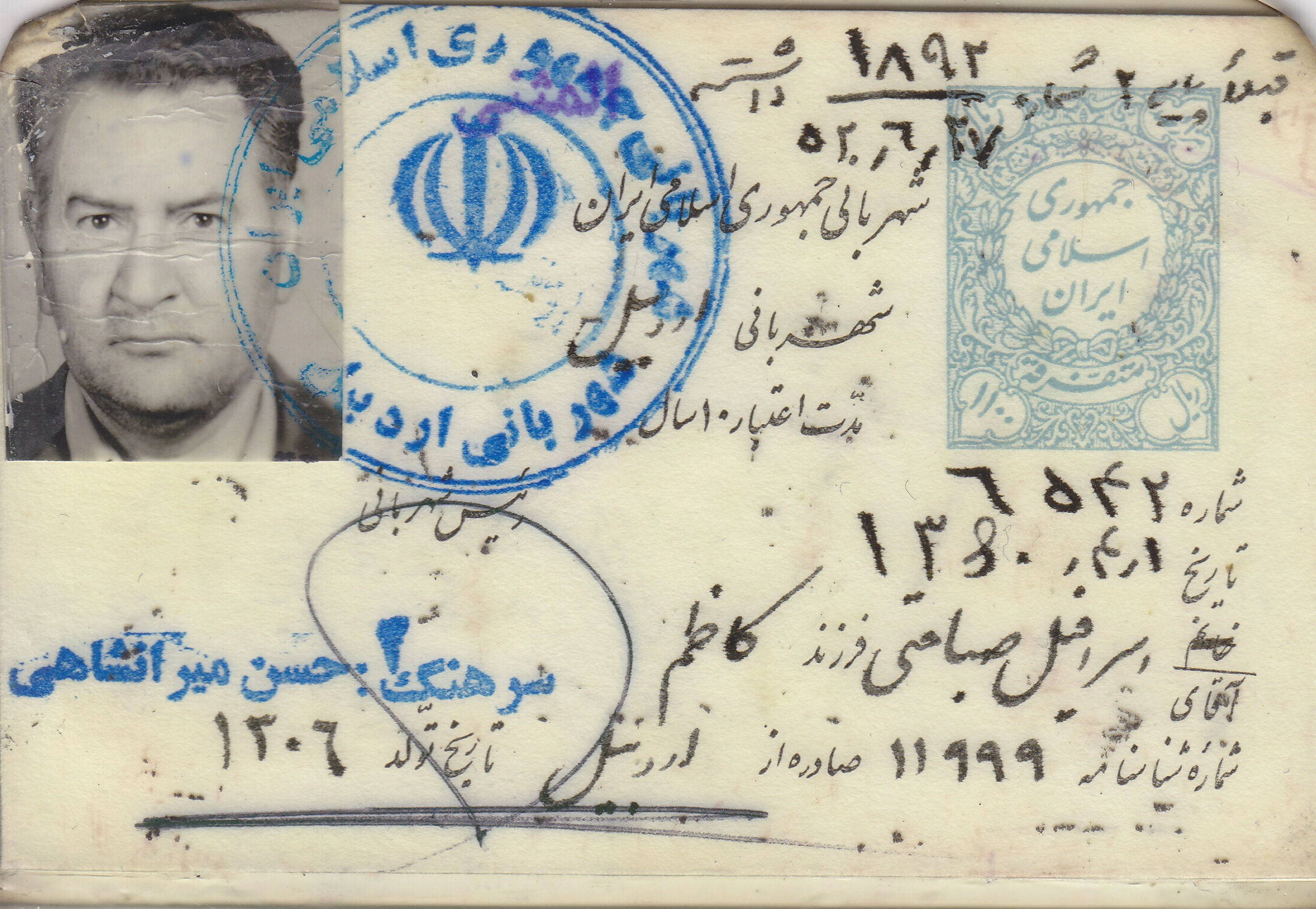
Sample of an Iranian driver’s license dating to the 1960s

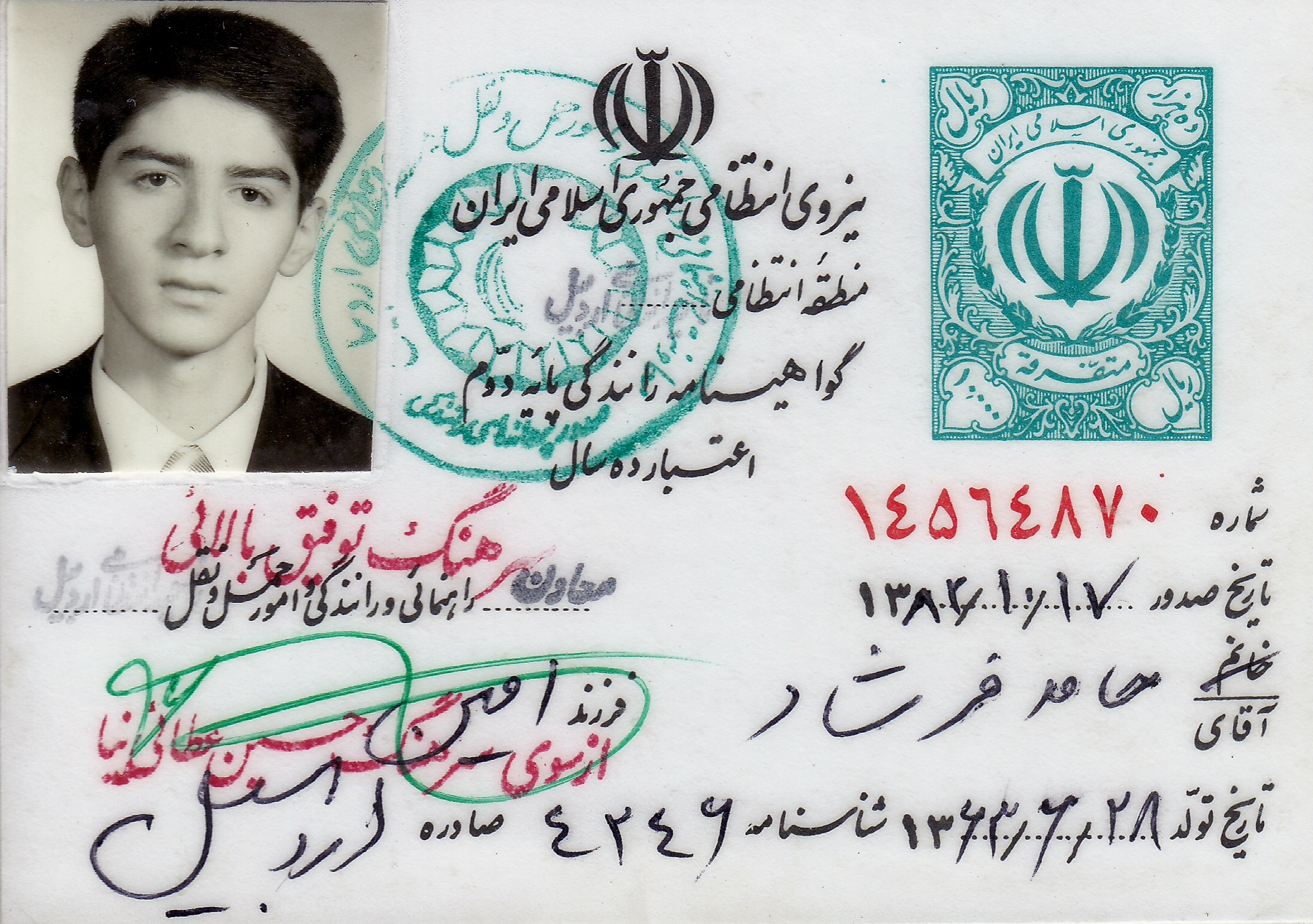
Sample of an Iranian driver’s license from the 1380s Solar Hijri decade (2001–2010)

There are five types of driver's license in Iran: Motorcycles Permit, Third Grade Driver's license, Second Grade Driver's license, First Grade Driver's license and Specific Driver's license. The minimum age for driving in Iran is 18 years old.

== Requirements for Iranian citizens ==
In order to get a licence, applicant must fulfill these requirements:

- Postal code
- Original and photocopy of national identity card and birth certificate
- Finger print
- Blood group document
- Biometric photo
- Driver's licence card fees
- Health report (usually eye check)
- Criminal record certificate (for first grade)

=== Age Requirements for licenses ===
- Motorcycles Permit - Must be at least 18 years old.
- Third Grade - Must be at least 18 years old.
- Second Grade - Must be at least 23 years old.
- First Grade - Must be at least 25 years old.
- Specific - Must be at least 23 years old.

== Requirements for foreigners ==
The required for international driving license application:

- Valid driving license of I.R.Iran with at least 40 days validity
- Photo copies 3x4 cm full-faced pictures with white background (In case If the picture on the driving license is with glasses these pictures should also be with glasses)
- Previous international driving license (if valid)
- A printed copy of the first page of passport (if holding one)
- Filled-in application form (Persian and English; the English birth date should be stated in A.D.)
- 4200000 Rial cash payment per license

== Restrictions ==
- Motorcycles Permit - Motorcycles/Motorized Tricycles
- Third Grade –Motor vehicles with a seating capacity for not more than 9 passengers and vehicle up to 3500 kg Gross Vehicle Weight (private)
- Second Grade - Motor vehicles with a seating capacity up to 26 passengers and vehicle up to 6000 kg Gross Vehicle Weight (transportation)
- First Grade - Buses and trucks with a capacity over 6000 kg Gross Vehicle Weight
- Specific - for Crane and similar

== See also ==
- Vehicle registration plates of Iran
- Iranian national identity card
- Iranian passport
- Identity documents in Iran
