= Statistical Center of Iran =

Iranian organization for statistics

Statistical Center of Iran (SCI)
- مرکز آمار ایران

Agency overview
- Formed: 1965
- Jurisdiction: Islamic Republic of Iran
- Headquarters: Tehran, Iran
- Agency executive: Gholamreza Goudarzi
- Website: www.amar.org.ir

The Statistical Center of Iran (abbr. SCI; Persian: مرکز آمار ایران) is the main organization for statistics in Iran. It is administered and funded by the Government of Iran.

SCI was established in 1965 by legislation from the National Consultative Assembly.

This center today plays a key role in the country's economic, social, and developmental policies. By providing transparent and accurate statistics, it is considered the main reference for national and regional strategic planning.

== National population censuses ==
SCI is the national body in charge of planning, performing and publishing national statistics on population and housing. The first nation-wide status belongs to 1955. Since then, SCI has run eight national statistics programs, including:

- 1st National Population and Housing Census, 1956
- 2nd National Population and Housing Census, 1966
- 3rd National Population and Housing Census, 1976
- 4th National Population and Housing Census, 1986
- 4th-2 National Population and Housing Census, 1991
- 5th National Population and Housing Census, 1996
- 6th National Population and Housing Census, 2006
- 7th National Population and Housing Census, 2011
- 8th National Population and Housing Census, 2016

== International cooperation ==
During 2004-2007, the Statistical Center of Iran was selected as a member of the UN Statistical Commission. It was also selected as a member in the Governing Council of Statistical Institution for Asia and the Pacific (SIAP) affiliated to ESCAP during 2005-2010.

== See also ==
- Demographics of Iran
- International rankings of Iran
- Economy of Iran
- National Organization for Civil Registration of Iran
