= Visa requirements for Iranian citizens =

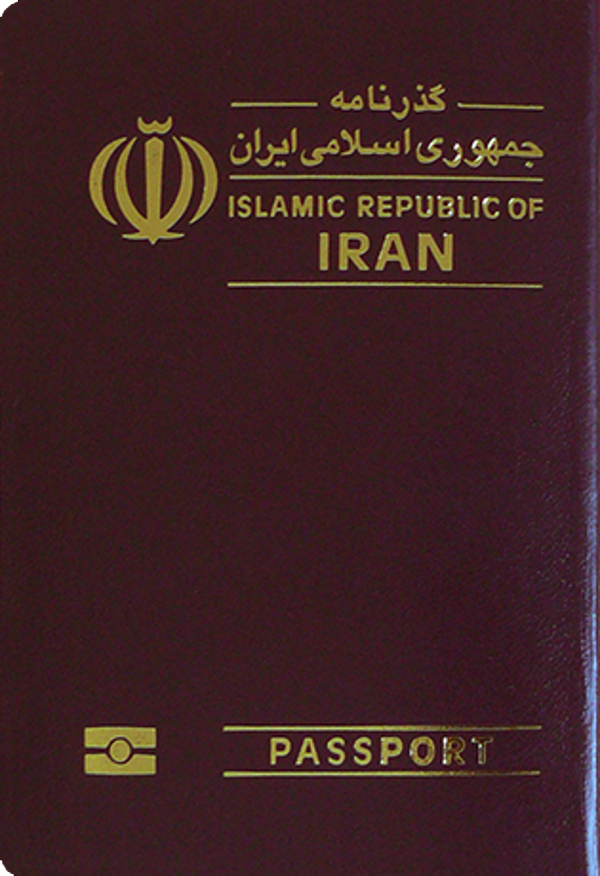
An Iranian passport

Visa requirements for Iranian citizens are administrative entry restrictions by the authorities of other states placed on citizens of the Iran.

As of 2026, Iranian citizens had visa-free or visa on arrival access to 40 countries and territories, ranking the Iranian passport 90th in the world according to the Henley Passport Index.

However, according to the most up-to-date list compiled on this wiki, Iranian passport holders can enter 94 countries (not counting dependent and partially unrecognized territories) with visa on arrival(10 countries), e-Visas(53 countries), visa on arrival or e-Visa(8 countries), ETA(3),Visa not required for tour groups / eVisa(1) or complete visa free(19 countries).

== Visa requirements map ==
Visa requirements for Iranian citizens Iran Visa not required Visa not required for tour groups / eVisa Visa on arrival eVisa Visa available both on arrival or online Visa required Admission restriction Admission refused

== Visa requirements ==
Visa requirements for holders of ordinary passports traveling for tourist purposes:

Country / Region	Visa requirement	Allowed stay	Notes (excluding departure fees)
Afghanistan	Visa required		Not eligible for the e-Visa program available to most nationalities.
Albania	Visa required		
Algeria	Visa required		Persons may be denied entry if entering with a passport containing visas or stamps issued by Israel.; Visitors on tours organized to some southern regions by an approved travel agency may obtain a visa on arrival for up to 30 days.
Andorra	Visa required		Although officially no visa is required, at least a Double Entry Schengen visa is required to enter Andorra since it has no own airport facility.
Angola	eVisa	30 days	30 days and can be extended twice for the same period.; Yellow Fever Vaccination(required).; Proof of sufficient funds to cover your stay in Angola.; Proof of accommodation(booking hotel, etc.).; Travel Itinerary(return ticket).
Antigua and Barbuda	eVisa		90 days with a valid visa or PR card for United States, Canada, United Kingdom or an EU Member State.; e-Visa can be obtained before departure.; Passengers require a printed e-Visa confirmation.
Argentina	Visa required		
Armenia	Visa not required	90 days	90 days within any 180 day period.
Australia	Admission restriction		From March 26, 2026, entry into Australia by Australian visa (Subclass 600) holders residing overseas has been banned.
Austria	Visa required		
Azerbaijan	eVisa	30 days	
Bahamas	eVisa		
Bahrain	Visa required		
Bangladesh	Visa required		
Barbados	Visa required		
Belarus	Visa required		
Belgium	Visa required		
Belize	Visa required		
Benin	eVisa	30 days	Must have an international vaccination certificate.; Three types of electronic visa are offered: the e-Visa valid for 30 days for a single entry (50 EUR), the e-Visa valid for 30 days for several (multiple) entries (75 EUR), and the e-Visa valid for 90 days to make several (multiple) entries (100 EUR).
Bhutan	eVisa	90 days	The Sustainable Development Fee (SDF) of 200 USD per person, per night for almost all visitors to Bhutan. Additionally, if payment is made in US dollars from September 1, 2023 to August 31, 2027, the SDF is 100 USD.
Bolivia	Online visa	30 days	Up to 90 days for online visa.; Proof of return or onward travel.; Hotel booking confirmation or invitation or letter from a host in Bolivia.; Proof of sufficient funds (approximately 50 USD/day).
Bosnia and Herzegovina	Visa required		
Botswana	eVisa		
Brazil	Visa required		
Brunei	Visa required		
Bulgaria	Visa required		
Burkina Faso	eVisa	30 days	May extend by 60 days.
Burundi	Online Visa / Visa on arrival	1 month	Visa on arrival either at Bujumbura International Airport (Melchior Ndadaye) or at all land borders for a maximum stay of 1 month.
Cambodia	eVisa / Visa on arrival	30 days	e-Visa can be obtained before departure.; Extendable 30-day visa on arrival.
Cameroon	eVisa	30 days	Proof of Yellow Fever Vaccination is required for all travelers to Cameroon.; May extend by 60 days.
Canada	Visa required		
Cape Verde	eVisa	90 days	Since November 4, 2026, new regulations have allowed nationals of 91 countries and territories to apply for a visa to Cape Verde online, without reinstating visas on arrival(including Iran). At the same time, the country's airport security fee has increased from 3,400 to 4,400 Cape Verdean escudos, approximately $44, with the new rate now reflected on the official EASE
Central African Republic	Visa required		
Chad	eVisa	30 days	
Chile	Visa required		
China	Visa required		24-hour visa-free transit through any international airports of China (except Ürümqi), allows domestic travel through different airports. (Note: Custom procedure for 24-hour visa-free transit is required in principle, except in Beijing (both Capital and Daxing), Shanghai Pudong, Hangzhou, Xiamen, Guangzhou, Shenzhen, Chengdu Tianfu and Xi'an if no leaving of international transit areas.)
Colombia	Online Visa		
Comoros	Visa on arrival	45 days	
Republic of the Congo	Online Visa required		Travelers must obtain a visa from the Republic of the Congo embassy. However, they can also apply for the visa online at the website of at the Republic of the Congo embassy in France.
Democratic Republic of the Congo	Visa required	7 days	
Costa Rica	Visa required		30 days with a valid multi entry US / Canada / UK visa.
Côte d'Ivoire	eVisa	90 days	Yellow Fever Vaccination Certificate.
Croatia	Visa required		
Cuba	evisa	90 days	The tourist visa is valid for a single entry to Cuba, for a stay of 90 days, extendable for 90 days.
Cyprus	Visa required		
Czech Republic	Visa required		
Denmark	Visa required		
Djibouti	eVisa	90 days	
Dominica	Visa not required	21 days	
Dominican Republic	Visa required		90 days with a valid US / Canada / UK / EU visa.
Ecuador	Online Visa		
Egypt	Visa required		Entry visas must be endorsed by Security Approval from Security of State
El Salvador	Visa required		30 days with a valid residence of several countries(UK, The USA, EU and etc.)
Equatorial Guinea	eVisa	90 days	e-Visa holders must arrive via Malabo International Airport.
Eritrea	Visa required		
Estonia	Visa required		
Eswatini	Visa required		
Ethiopia	eVisa	90 days	e-Visa holders must arrive via Addis Ababa Bole International Airport.
Fiji	Online Visa		
Finland	Visa required		
France	Visa required		
Gabon	eVisa	90 days	e-Visa holders must arrive at Libreville International Airport.
Gambia	Visa required		
Georgia	Visa not required	45 days	Must have return ticket.; Hotel reservation, insurance and sufficient funds required.; If arriving by ground border, obtain approval by local officer.
Germany	Visa required		
Ghana	eVisa	90 days	Ghana has brought online the official portal that will be used for electronic visa applications starting May 25, 2026; Electronic visa fees are set at $260 for a single-entry e-Visa under normal processing of three to five business days, $338 for 48-hour priority processing and $442 for five-hour express processing. For a multiple-entry e-Visa, the listed fees are $468, $608 or $796, depending on the processing time selected
Greece	Visa required		
Grenada	Visa required		
Guatemala	Visa required		
Guinea	eVisa	90 days	
Guinea-Bissau	Visa on arrival	90 days	
Guyana	eVisa		
Haiti	Visa not required	90 days	
Honduras	Visa required		
Hungary	Visa required		
Iceland	Visa required		
India	Visa required		
Indonesia	eVisa	60 days	Iranian citizens require a guarantor to obtain an Indonesian eVisa; therefore, it is impossible to obtain one directly through the Directorate General of Immigration website. The travel agency acts as your sponsor during the visa application process, and Indonesia issues the visa under that company's sponsorship.
Iraq	Visa not required	30 days	Visa-free to Kurdistan region for 15 days.
Ireland	Visa required		
Israel	Visa required		Confirmation from Israeli Foreign Ministry required before visa issued.
Italy	Visa required		
Jamaica	Visa required		Permanent residents of Canada and cruise passengers of any nationality who intend to remain in the island during the stay of the vessel by which they arrived and to depart on the same vessel, are not required to hold visa.
Japan	Visa required		
Jordan	Visa required		Normal passport holders must obtain security approval prior to arrival.
Kazakhstan	Visa not required	14 days	
Kenya	Electronic Travel Authorisation	90 days	Applications can be submitted up to 90 days prior to travel and must be submitted at least 3 days in advance.; eTA fee is 32.50 USD.; Proof of reservation at the hotel where visitors plan to stay is required (if staying with friends, an invitation letter is also acceptable).; Yellow fever vaccination certificate is required if coming from endemic countries.
Kiribati	Visa required		
North Korea	Visa required		
South Korea	Visa required		
Kuwait	Visa required		
Kyrgyzstan	eVisa	90 days	e-Visa holders must arrive via Manas International Airport or Osh Airport or through land crossings with China (at Irkeshtam and Torugart), Kazakhstan (at Ak-jol, Ak-Tilek, Chaldybar, Chon-Kapka), Tajikistan (at Bor-Dobo, Kulundu, Kyzyl-Bel) and Uzbekistan (at Dostuk).
Laos	Visa required		
Latvia	Visa required		
Lebanon	Visa required		
Lesotho	Visa required		
Liberia	e-VOA	3 months	
Libya	Admission refused		
Liechtenstein	Visa required		
Lithuania	Visa required		
Luxembourg	Visa required		
Madagascar	eVisa / Visa on arrival	90 days	Arrival at Ivato International Airport in Antananarivo and all other airports with international connections (such as Antsiranana, Toamasina, Tuléar).; For stays of 61 to 90 days, the visa fee is 59 USD.
Malawi	eVisa	30 days	
Malaysia	Visa not required	30 days	from 03 September, 2025 Islamic Republic of Iran and Malaysia has agreed to extend the eligibility period for entrance visa for citizens of both countries from 14 days to 30 days.
Maldives	Free visa on arrival	30 days	
Mali	Visa required		
Malta	Visa required		
Marshall Islands	Visa required		
Mauritania	eVisa	30 days	Available at Nouakchott–Oumtounsy International Airport.; e-Visa is available for the following durations: 30 days, 90 days, 360 days
Mauritius	Visa on arrival	14 days	
Mexico	Visa required		180 days with a valid visa issued by Canada, Japan, United States, United Kingdom or an EU Member State.; Entry may be refused by immigration officials for individuals who were previously denied a US visa, even if holding a valid Mexican visa.
Micronesia	Visa not required	30 days	Extension of stay is possible up to 60 days.
Moldova	Visa required		Citizens holding a residence permit or a valid visa issued by one of the member states of the European Union or one of the parties to the Schengen Agreement can apply for an electronic visa.
Monaco	Visa required		
Mongolia	Visa required		
Montenegro	Visa required		30 days with a valid visa issued by Ireland, United States, United Kingdom or an EU Member State.
Morocco	Visa required		
Mozambique	eVisa / Visa on arrival	30 days	
Myanmar	Visa required		
Namibia	eVisa	3 months	
Nauru	Visa required		
Nepal	Visa required		
Netherlands	Visa required		
New Zealand	Visa required		Holders of an Australian Permanent Resident Visa or Resident Return Visa may be granted a New Zealand Resident Visa on arrival permitting indefinite stay (pursuant to the Trans-Tasman Travel Arrangement), subject to meeting character requirements and obtaining an Electronic Travel Authority prior to departure.
Nicaragua	Visa required		
Niger	Visa required		
Nigeria	eVisa	30 days	
North Macedonia	Visa required		15 days with a valid multi entry Schengen visa.
Norway	Visa required		
Oman	Visa not required / eVisa	14 days / 30 days	Require hotel reservation, health insurance and return ticket.
Pakistan	eVisa	3 months	Visa fee of 25 USD for single entry and less than 3 months.; Multiple entry e-Visa is also available.
Palau	Free visa on arrival	30 days	The visa is valid for a maximum stay of 30 days but can be extended twice for a fee. In order to obtain a visa on arrival visitors are required to have a proof of sufficient funds (200 USD per week)
Panama	Visa required		30 days with a valid Australia / Canada / US / UK visa.
Papua New Guinea	eVisa	60 days	Starting October 1, 2025, all travelers entering Papua New Guinea will be required to complete a digital arrival card called the “PNG Digital Arrival Card (PNG DAC).”
Paraguay	Visa required		May submit the visa application online, but must later go to a Paraguayan embassy or consulate to complete the process.
Peru	Visa required		
Philippines	Visa required		
Poland	Visa required		
Portugal	Visa required		
Qatar	eVisa / Visa on arrival	30 days	Hotel reservation via Discover Qatar must be confirmed.; A tourist visa for an expatriate for one month (not extendable) for a fee of (QR 100); Confirmed round-trip ticket.
Romania	Visa required		
Russia	Visa not required (conditional) / eVisa	15 days / 30 days	Visa not required for 15 days for travelling as part of an accredited tour group (5 ~ 50 people).
Rwanda	eVisa / Visa on arrival	30 days	
Saint Kitts and Nevis	eVisa	30 days	
Saint Lucia	Visa required		
Saint Vincent and the Grenadines	Visa required		
Samoa	Entry permit on arrival	90 days	Passport valid 6 months, return or onward ticket, bank statement, never deported.
San Marino	Visa required		
São Tomé and Príncipe	eVisa		15 days with a valid multi entry Schengen visa.
Saudi Arabia	Visa required		
Senegal	Visa required		
Serbia	eVisa	90 days	Certificate of travel health insurance.; Evidence of the amount of funds available for maintenance during the intended stay.; Book a return or multi-trip ticket/driver's license, vehicle insurance if traveling by private car.
Seychelles	Electronic Travel Authorisation	3 months	Application can be submitted up to 30 days before travel.; Visitors must upload a reservation confirmation(s) for each visitor's location of stay in Seychelles.; Yellow fever vaccination certificate is required if coming from endemic countries.; Payment of the fee (EUR 10) by credit or debit card.; Valid for one journey only and it expires once exit the country.
Sierra Leone	eVisa / Visa on arrival	3 months / 30 days	
Singapore	Visa required		Visa application can be submitted online using the 'e-Service' through a strategic partner or a local contact in Singapore.
Slovakia	Visa required		
Slovenia	Visa required		
Solomon Islands	Visa required		May obtain a visa on arrival if they have a pre-arranged visa approval.
Somalia	eVisa	30 days	
South Africa	eVisa		e-Visa holders must arrive at O. R. Tambo International Airport.
South Sudan	eVisa		Obtainable online 30 days single entry for 100 USD, 90 days multiple entry for 200 USD and 180 days multiple entry for 350 USD.; Printed visa authorization must be presented at the time of travel.
Spain	Visa required		
Sri Lanka	Electronic Travel Authorisation	30 days	Sri Lanka has set May 25, 2026, as the start date for its new free tourist visa scheme for citizens of 40 countries(including Iranians). Eligible travelers will still be required to obtain an Electronic Travel Authorization (ETA) before arrival.
Sudan	Visa required		
Suriname	Visa not required	90 days	An entrance fee of USD 50 or EUR 50 must be paid online prior to arrival.; Multiple entry e-Visa is also available.
Sweden	Visa required		
Switzerland	Visa required		
Syria	Permission required		Can only enter the country with prior authorization from the Syrian authorities.
Tajikistan	Visa not required / eVisa	30 days / 60 days	Applicable by direct or third country air travel and by land crossing.; Up to 30 days per 90 day period.; eVisa for 60 days per 90 day period for 30 USD.
Tanzania	eVisa	90 days	
Thailand	eVisa	60 days	Must pay at Embassy in Tehran only (40 USD).; Can apply at Thai Embassy in other countries if you have resident permit for that country.
Timor-Leste	Visa on arrival	30 days	Visa on arrival at the Presidente Nicolau Lobato International Airport or at the Dili Sea Port.; Single entry visa valid for up to 30 days is granted for fee of 30 USD.
Togo	eVisa	15 days	Extension of stay is possible for additional 90 days.
Tonga	Visa required		
Trinidad and Tobago	eVisa	90 days	
Tunisia	Visa not required	15 days	15 days every 180 days.; Hotel booking and return ticket required.
Turkey	Visa not required	90 days	90 days during one trip, no more than 90 days within any 180 days.
Turkmenistan	eVisa	30 days	As of October 2, 2026, the official evisa.migration.gov.tm portal provides access to the main requirements for the program introduced the previous day by the State Migration Service.
Tuvalu	Visa on arrival	1 month	Visa fee is 100 AUD.
Uganda	eVisa	3 months	Verified at port of entry.; Can also be entered on an East Africa Tourist Visa issued by Kenya or Rwanda.; The fee for this visa is 100 USD.
Ukraine	Visa required		
United Arab Emirates	Admission refused		Following Iranian strikes on the UAE, Iranian passport holders are no longer allowed to enter or transit through the country.
United Kingdom	Visa required		
United States	Admission refused		Effective June 9, 2025, U.S. visas will no longer be issued to citizens of 12 countries, with certain exemptions.; Iranian citizens can apply for immigrant visas if they face ethnic or religious persecution in their country.
Uruguay	Visa required		Prior authorisation required before issuing visa.
Uzbekistan	eVisa	30 days	
Vanuatu	eVisa	120 days	Visa fee is 5150 VUV (40 USD).
Vatican City	Visa required		
Venezuela	Visa not required	15 days	May extend by 15 days.; Return ticket or proof of next destination.
Vietnam	eVisa		e-Visa is valid for 90 days and multiple entry.; Return tickect is required.; Only Phú Quốc (PQC) island has visa exemption for up to 30 days.
Yemen	Visa required		Yemen introduced an e-Visa system for visitors who meet certain eligibility requirements (group travel of 10 or more people, business trips, and transit etc.).
Zambia	eVisa	90 days	
Zimbabwe	eVisa / Visa on arrival	1 month	

== Dependent, disputed, or restricted territories ==
Unrecognized or partially recognized countries

Territory	Conditions of access	Notes
Abkhazia	Visa required	Below are the requirements for receiving an entry permit to the Republic of Abkhazia: Copy of passport (sent by e-mail or by fax). Please make sure that your passport is valid for at least 6 months after your planned entry to Abkhazia. Filled electronic application. You should complete all sections of the application. If any necessary information is missing, the application will not be considered. An entry permit letter for visiting the Republic of Abkhazia will be sent to the email address from which the application was sent or to the fax number stated in the application.; Must have double entry or multiple Russian visas to come to Abkhazia (it is a mandatory requirement, since the Russian Embassy in Abkhazia will not issue transit visas to the citizens of Iran).
Kosovo	Visa required	Visa is not required for holders of a valid biometric residence permit issued by one of the Schengen member states or a valid multi-entry Schengen Visa, a holder of a valid Laissez-Passer issued by United Nations Organizations, NATO, OSCE, Council of Europe or European Union a holder of a valid travel documents issued by EU Member and Schengen States, United States of America, Canada, Australia and Japan based on the 1951 Convention on Refugee Status or the 1954 Convention on the Status of Stateless Persons, as well as holders of valid travel documents for foreigners (max. 15 days stay)
Northern Cyprus	Visa not required	TRNC Immigration Police Officer at the ports of entry is authorized to issue a maximum of 90 days to enter and stay if the responses to his/her questions are satisfactory. The visitors who intend to stay longer than the permitted period should apply before the visa expiry date to the Immigration Department of the Police Headquarters for an extension. Visitors who stay longer than the expiry date without an extension of stay will be given a notice of “visa penalty” fine at the port of departure. The fine will be paid by the visitor at the re-entry to the TRNC
State of Palestine	Visa required	Arrival by sea to Gaza Strip not allowed.
Sahrawi Arab Democratic Republic		Undefined visa regime in the Western Sahara controlled territory.
Somaliland	Visa on arrival	
South Ossetia	Visa not required	To enter South Ossetia, visitors must have a multiple-entry visa for Russia and register their stay with the Migration Service of the Ministry of Internal Affairs within 3 days.
Taiwan	Online Visa	Return ticket is required.; Iranian citizens can apply online and in the nearest embassies in different countries can pay for the visa.
Transnistria	Visa not required	Registration required after 24h.

Dependent and autonomous territories

Territory	Conditions of access	Notes
China
Hong Kong	eVisa	
Macau	Visa on arrival	30 days and visa fee is 25 USD.
Denmark
Faroe Islands	Visa required	
Greenland	Visa required	
France
Clipperton Island	Special permit required	
French Guiana	Visa required	
French Polynesia	Visa required	
Guadeloupe	Visa required	
Martinique	Visa required	
Saint Barthélemy	Visa required	
Saint Martin	Visa required	
Mayotte	Visa required	
New Caledonia	Visa required	
Réunion	Visa required	
Saint Pierre and Miquelon	Visa required	
Wallis and Futuna	Visa required	
Netherlands
Aruba	Visa required	Holders of a valid visa issued by Schengen Member State (‘C’ or ‘D’ visa) do not require a visa for 90 days for each territory.
Bonaire	Visa required	Holders of a valid visa issued by Schengen Member State (‘C’ or ‘D’ visa) do not require a visa for 90 days for each territory.
Sint Eustatius	Visa required	Holders of a valid visa issued by Schengen Member State (‘C’ or ‘D’ visa) do not require a visa for 90 days for each territory.
Saba	Visa required	Holders of a valid visa issued by Schengen Member State (‘C’ or ‘D’ visa) do not require a visa for 90 days for each territory.
Curaçao	Visa required	Holders of a valid visa issued by Schengen Member State (‘C’ or ‘D’ visa) do not require a visa for 90 days for each territory.
Sint Maarten	Visa required	Holders of a valid visa issued by Schengen Member State (‘C’ or ‘D’ visa) do not require a visa for 90 days for each territory.
New Zealand
Cook Islands	Visa not required	31 days.; By mid-September 2025, the Cook Islands will launch an online electronic visa and permit application system in a bid to simplify its travel formalities for more than 31 days of stay and fee price is NZ$470.00 and the provision of certain documents, such as a form, a valid exit ticket and proof of sufficient funds for the extended duration of stay.
Niue	Visa not required	30 days. Not required by bona fide tourists staying less than 30 days with return or onward tickets and sufficient funds for length of stay. Extensions are available by applying to the Immigration Office before arrival: PO Box 67, Alofi, Niue Island. Phone (683) 4349 for enquiries.
Tokelau	Permit required	
Norway
(Norway) Jan Mayen	Permit required	Permit issued by the local police required for staying for less than 24 hours and permit issued by the Norwegian police for staying for more than 24 hours.
(Norway) Svalbard	Visa not required	Unlimited period under Svalbard Treaty. Everyone may, in principle, travel to Svalbard, and foreign citizens do not need a visa or a work or residence permit from Norwegian authorities in order to settle in Svalbard. Foreign citizens with visa requirements to the Schengen area do, however, need a valid Schengen visa if they travel through Schengen on their way to or from Svalbard. It is required with two entries in the traveller's visa to be able to return to the Schengen area (mainland Norway) after the stay at Svalbard.
United Kingdom
Akrotiri and Dhekelia	Visa required	
Anguilla	Visa required	Holders of a valid visa issued by the United Kingdom do not require a visa for 3 months.
Bermuda	Visa required	
British Indian Ocean Territory	Special permit required	
British Virgin Islands	Visa required	Holders of UK, US or Canada visas and are visiting the BVI for Business or tourism related matters, to enter and remain for a period of less than six months, without the need for a visa.
Cayman Islands	Visa required	
Falkland Islands	Visa required	
Gibraltar	Visa required	Holders of a valid visa issued by the United Kingdom do not require a visa.
Montserrat	eVisa	A Montserrat e-Visa is equivalent to a conventional visa, but no paper is inserted in your passport and there is no need for you to visit a British Consulate to submit an application. Applications for eVisas are submitted online, verified online, and in most cases, eVisas will be approved and issued online within 24 Hours. Having a valid eVisa authorizes you to travel to Montserrat; but you are still subject to the normal immigration checks upon arrival.
Pitcairn Islands	Visa not required	14 days visa-free and landing fee 35 USD or tax of 5 USD if not going ashore. There is no need for prior entry clearance if your visit is for 14 days or less and you intend to arrive and depart on the same vessel, and you may obtain leave to enter on arrival at Pitcairn. You must ensure you can adequately maintain and accommodate yourself without recourse to public funds and meet the other criteria in Part III Para 6 of the Immigration Control Ordinance 2014. If your visit is for longer than 14 days but less than six months you must complete an entry clearance application form well in advance of your visit (at least 3 months is recommended). The application form should be submitted electronically to the Pitcairn Immigration Officer on immigration@pitcairn.gov.pn and copied to the Pitcairn Islands Office on admin@pitcairn.gov.pn. If you do not get an acknowledgement within two weeks, telephone on (649) 366 0186 to confirm your application has been received. If your visit is for professional or business reasons, you should follow the same visa application procedure but the conditions for any visit to the island will be as described in Part III Para 8 of the Immigration Control Ordinance 2014.
Saint Helena	eVisa	
Ascension Island	Admission refused	From May 2015, the Ascension Island Government does not issue entry visas including eVisas to nationals of Iran.
Tristan da Cunha	Permission required	Permission to land required for 15/30 pounds sterling (yacht/ship passenger) for Tristan da Cunha Island or 20 pounds sterling for Gough Island, Inaccessible Island or Nightingale Islands.
South Georgia and the South Sandwich Islands	Permit required	Pre-arrival permit from the Commissioner required (72 hours/1 month for 110/160 pounds sterling).
Turks and Caicos Islands	Visa required	
United States
American Samoa	Entry permit required	
Guam	Visa required	
Northern Mariana Islands	Visa required	
Puerto Rico	Visa required	
U.S. Virgin Islands	Visa required	
Antarctica and adjacent islands
Special permits required for Bouvet Island, British Antarctic Territory, French Southern and Antarctic Lands, Argentine Antarctica, (Australia) Australian Antarctic Territory, (Antártica Chilena Province) Chilean Antarctic Territory, (Australia) Heard Island and McDonald Islands, (Norway) Peter I Island, (Norway) Queen Maud Land, (New Zealand) Ross Dependency.

Territory	Visa requirement	Notes
Iraqi Kurdistan	eVisa	30 days
(Malaysia) Sabah and Sarawak	Visa not required	Visitor passes issued for entry into Peninsular Malaysia and Sabah are not valid for entry into Sarawak. Fresh visit passes must be obtained on arrival at the point of entry in Sarawak. However, subject to conditions stipulated, visit passes issued by the Immigration Authorities in Sabah and Sarawak are valid for Peninsular Malaysia.; For long-term Peninsular Malaysia pass holders visiting Sabah, a fresh pass must be obtained. The pass has a validity of 14 days for tourism, the same as Peninsular Malaysia.; In case a Peninsular Malaysia visit pass is used for Sabah, the validity of the Peninsular Malaysia visit pass shall apply.; Visit passes to Sarawak can be issued for up to 30 days at the discretion of the immigration officer.; Return tickets to overseas destination or Peninsular Malaysia and hotel bookings are required and will be inspected upon arrival.
(Vietnam) Phú Quốc	Visa not required	In September 2005 the government passed regulations specifically in relation Phu Quoc Island entry, exit and residence of foreigners or Vietnamese holding foreign passports. These regulations are provided below in more detail. Under this Decision, foreigners and Vietnamese holding foreign passports who are, entering, exiting from, and residing in Phu Quoc Island for a stay period not exceeding 15 days are exempt from visas. The following section provides a summary of those regulations.
(China) Tibet Autonomous Region	TTP is required	As Tibet is under the jurisdiction of China, tourist will need to obtain the first document, Chinese Visa, for the purpose of entering China. Tourists can apply for it in a Chinese Embassy overseas or in Hong Kong. The Tibet Travel Permit is issued by Tibet Tourism Bureau (TTB). It is also called Tibet visa, for the purpose of entering Tibet. Travelers need to have Tibet Travel Permit to enter into Lhasa or any other parts of the Tibetan Autonomous Region. It is obtained through tour operators for most tourists. When you take a flight or train to Lhasa, you will be asked to show this permit during check-in. Furthermore, the permit is also needed by groups traveling by road. But this will be arranged by the travel agency organizing the trip.

== See also ==
- Visa policy of Iran
- Iranian passport
- Foreign relations of Iran
- List of nationalities forbidden at border
