= National Organization for Civil Registration of Iran =

Civil Registration of Iran

- سازمان ملی ثبت احوال ایران
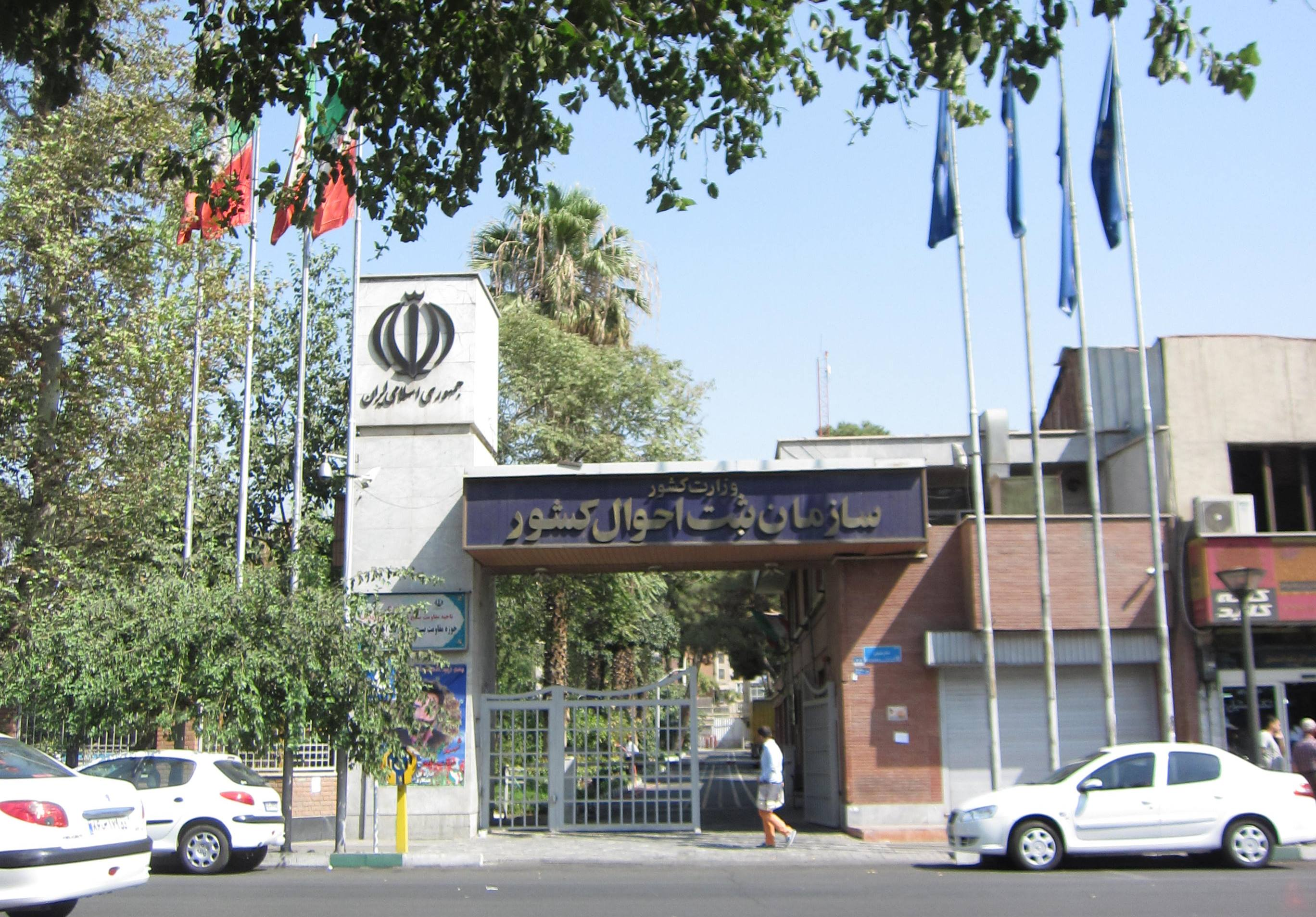
- National Organization for Civil Registration of Iran in Tehran

Agency overview
- Formed: December 12, 1918; 107 years ago, Approved on 12 December 1918 and started first activity in Tehran on 25 December 1918
- Type: Government agency
- Jurisdiction: Ministry of Interior (Iran)
- Headquarters: 137719411, Tehran, Iran, Sepah St., After Hassan Abad Sq., Nos. 184 and 186; 35.6888224°N 51.4074849°E
- Employees: 8560 (September 2016)
- Agency executive: Mohammad Jamalo
- Parent department: Ministry of Interior
- Website: www.sabteahval.ir

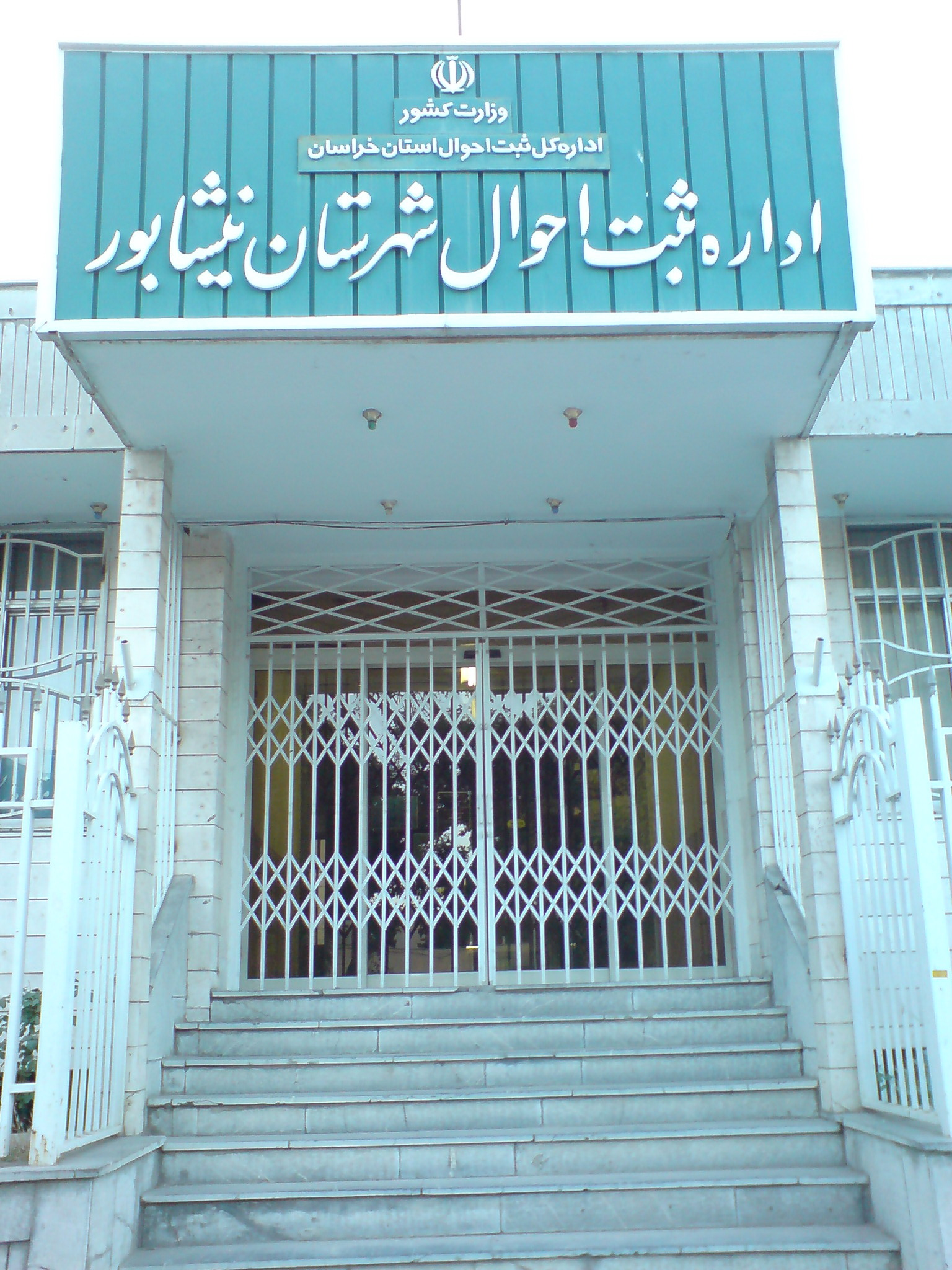
Nishapur branch of National Organization for Civil Registration of Iran

National Organization for Civil Registration of Iran is one of the governmental organizations in Iran that is responsible for collecting information and population statistics of Iran. This organization is one of the subordinate institutions of the Ministry of Interior of Iran. The organization is responsible for providing basic registration information such as births, deaths and marriages, as well as issuing identity documents such as birth certificates and Identity certificate. The current head of the organization is Hashem Kargar. In Iran, the third day of Dey (month) (23 or 24 December) has been named as National Organization for Civil Registration Day.

It was successfully hacked September 2023 vital records of l entire population stolen.

== History ==
In the past, birth and marriage registration in Iran was traditionally done mostly by referring to clerics, neighborhood elders, or tribal elders. Gradually registration in the current European bye method became popular in Iran. According to the decision of the Cabinet of Ministers on 12 December 1918, the regulations for the establishment of the Civil Registry Office in the Ministry of Interior were prepared and the first Iranian Identity Booklet (Shenasnameh) for a girl named Fatemeh Irani was issued on 25 December (3 Dey (month) SH) of the same year. Because of that in many years later, the third day of Dey (month) (23 or 24 December) has been named as National Organization for Civil Registration Day. From March 1925, according to the law, obtaining identity booklet was required for all Iranian citizens in the areas where the Civil Registry Office was established. The General Office of Census and Civil Registration, in accordance with the decree of 10 June 1928, began its work with independent duties and as an institution affiliated to the Ministry of Interior. With the revision of the duties and regulations related to this institution, its name was changed to the General Directorate of Statistics and Civil Registration in 1940. The last time in 1976, with the definition of new duties and structure, this agency was renamed to its current name, the National Organization for Civil Registration. After the Iranian Revolution in 1979, some of the duties and bylaws of this organization were reviewed by the Islamic Consultative Assembly in 1984.

== Structure ==
The National Organization for Civil Registration of Iran has a headquarter and thirty-one general offices in thirty-one provinces of Iran. The administrative structure of each general administration is almost similar to the structure of the headquarter. The headquarter area has three deputies and six general administrations. The head of the National Organization for Civil Registration of Iran is considered as one of the Deputy Ministers of Interior.

== National population database ==
Created in 1997 National population database keeps national identity code and postal address code.

== Responsibilities ==
The National Organization for Civil Registration of Iran is responsible for collecting four main categories of demographic information: birth registration, death registration, marriage registration and divorce registration. According to the resolution of the Islamic Consultative Assembly in 1984, the duties of the organization are as follows:

1. Registration of birth and issuance of identity certificate
2. Registration of death and issuance of certificate
3. Replacing existing identity certificate
4. Registration of marriage and divorce and transfer of developments
5. Issuance of birth certificates for foreign citizens and setting up registers of all events and surnames
6. Creating a demographic database and issuing a national identification card
7. Collecting and preparing human statistics throughout the country and publishing it
8. Other prescribed duties assigned to the organization in accordance with the law.

Also issuing a national ID card with a national number and a 10-digit postal code for people over the age of 15 in Iran is another task of this organization.

== Mission ==
The total mission of the organization is around these three issues:

- Record vital events
- Proof of Iranian identity and citizenship documents
- Production and dissemination of human statistics and demographic changes in the country

== Macro goals of the organization ==
The National Organization for Civil Registration of Iran pursues the following macro goals in long-term:

1. Organizing the registration of vital events and migration in the country
2. Proving of registration documents and identity documents
3. Establishment of a comprehensive system for identifying Iranians
4. Production and publication of statistics and demographic information of Iranians
5. Establishment of electronic organization
6. Continuous improvement of quality and quantity of services
7. Increase the efficiency and improve the productivity of the organization
8. Sensitizing and raising public awareness
9. Reform the budgeting system of the organization with the approach of defining and providing the required resources

== Qualitative goals of the organization ==
According to the country's development plan, the following quality objectives are on the agenda of the National Organization for Civil Registration of Iran:

1. Timely recording of vital events using legal capacity
2. Establishment of government civil registration services throughout the country
3. Increasing the safety factor of registration documents and identities
4. Completing and updating Iranian identity information (establishing causal and relative connections in the database)
5. Providing the ground for electronic identification of Iranians
6. Production and publication of demographic statistics for the country's development program
7. Raise Electronic informative services up to 30%
8. Reflection of organizational work processes and services through electronic media tools
9. Providing services to all Iranians electronically 20%
10. Development of information exchange infrastructure
11. Utilizing the capabilities of the non-governmental sector with the approach of handing over the affairs of the enterprise
12. Establishment of result and product control system
13. Increasing the job motivation of employees by providing a suitable position and professional status
14. Upgrading the level of technical, scientific and job skills of employees
15. Adaptation and standardization of physical spaces, equipment, structure and work processes
16. Support for innovation, creativity and technical and research talents
17. Strengthening moral virtues, work conscience, work ethic and discipline in the organization
18. Establish a performance management system including performance appraisal of the organization, management and employees
19. Increase the level of public trust in society
20. Explain the rights and duties of society and organization
21. Naming Culture Engineering
22. Necessary efforts to reduce the reliance of the organization's current expenses on the country's public budget
23. Forecasting the organization's budget based on the volume of activities and services within the operating budget
24. Attention to financial and budgetary discipline and balance between resources and expenditures of the organization

== Review and amend the Civil Registration Law ==
The plan to revise and amend the Civil Registration Law was approved by the Ministry of Science in September 2017. Extensive studies have started since the development of the research plan and continue to this day. The result of these studies is the presentation of a revised version of the Civil Registration Law. However, the changes and developments in the field of information and communication technology and the electronicization of the processes of recording the four events (birth, death, marriage and divorce) and social developments, necessitate the revision of this law.

== See also ==
- Iranian identity booklet
- Iranian identity card
- Statistical Center of Iran
- Demographics of Iran
- Persian name
- International rankings of Iran
- Economy of Iran
- Institute of Standards and Industrial Research of Iran
- Iranian National Tax Administration
