= Iranian Immigration & Passport Police Office =

Subdivision of Law Enforcement Command of Islamic Republic of Iran

Immigration & Passport Police Office پلیس مهاجرت و گذرنامه

Jurisdictional structure
- National agency: Iran
- Operations jurisdiction: Iran

Operational structure
- Parent agency: Police Command of the Islamic Republic of Iran

The Immigration & Passport Police Office (Persian: پلیس مهاجرت و گذرنامه) is a subdivision of the Police Command of the Islamic Republic of Iran with the authority to issue Iranian passports and deal with immigration to Iran. The agency is a member of ICAO's Public Key Directory (PKD).
