= Iranian identity card =

National identity card of Iran

Iranian national identity card
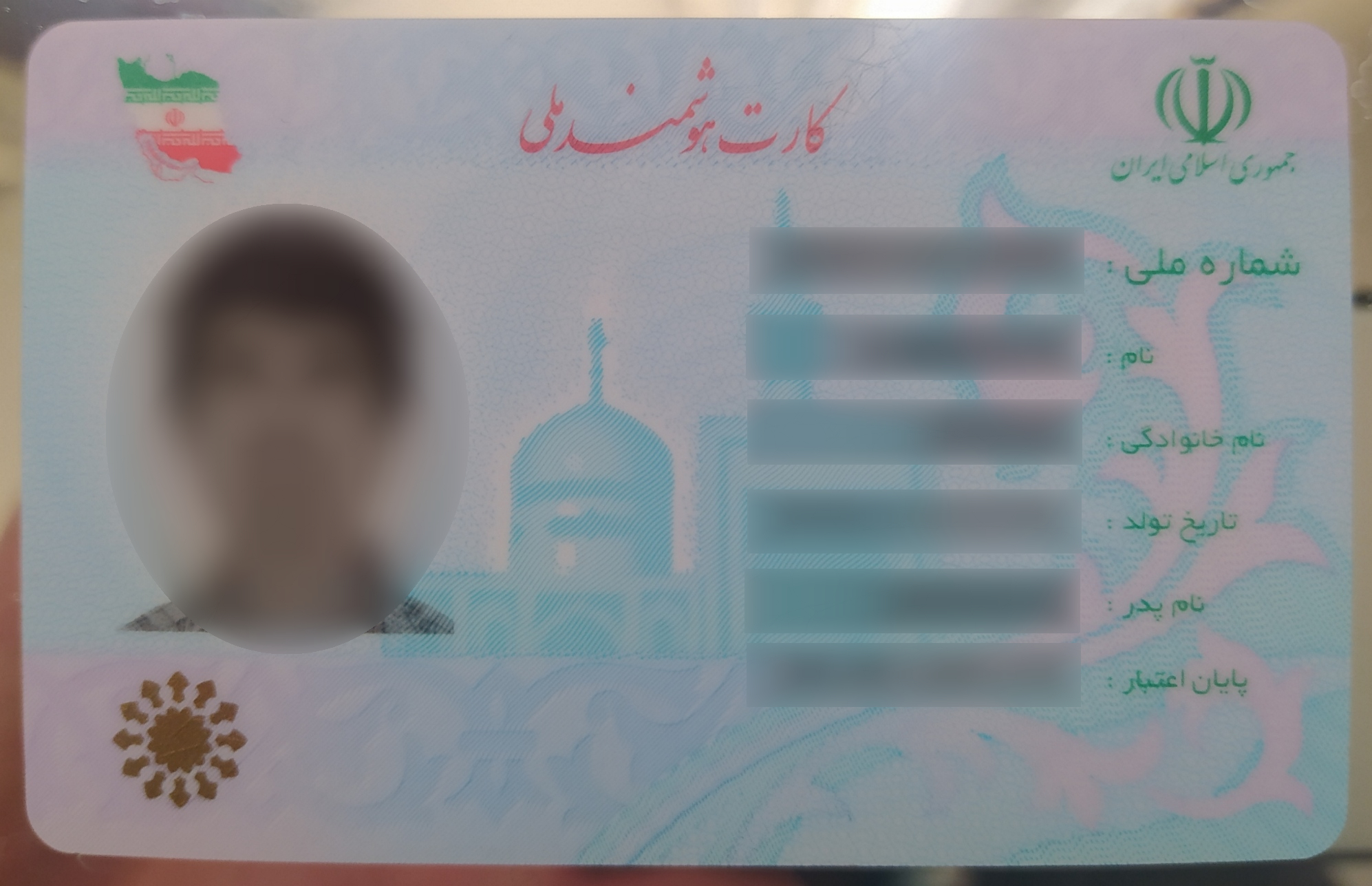
- Image of the Iranian national identity card
- Issued by: Iran
- Eligibility: 15 years of age
- Expiration: 7 years from date of issuance (At least until 2027-03-20)
- Website: https://www.ncr.ir/idcard/

The Iranian identity card is the primary identity document in Iran. Every citizen age of 15 and above, whether resident or not, needs to apply for such a card, which bears their unique national identity number, given name, surname, birth date, and postal code. The current version of this card is called the national smart card (Persian: کارت هوشمند ملّی) and is the successor of the national card (Persian: کارت ملّی). This card is intended to reduce the need for the more valuable Iranian identity booklet, which is issued at birth.

The National Organization For Civil Registration began issuing national smart cards in 2015. At the time, the application was voluntary. As with other smart cards, the national card features a smart chip and an RFID. The Iranian authorities initially advertised this card as a means of secure participation in elections that guarantees voting integrity.

On the back of the card it says it is legally required to notify Civil Registration of address changes.

In the near future, identity booklets will be replaced by these cards. It will also replace Iranian banks' debit cards in August 2023.

Based on the latest announcement by the National Organization for Civil Registration of Iran, the validity of all Iranian identity cards that have expired will be extended until 20 March 2027 (end of 1405 based on Iraninan Calendar), and there is no need to replace them.

== Other uses ==
In 2024 people sold their IDs to people who register to purchase imported vehicles.

== Services blacklist ==
In 2024 the judiciary made it illegal for the government to disable convicts' identification number.

== Photo print ==
The photo in ID is a black and white laserprinted image, and is often subject of criticism for being soulless and unlifelike. The camera person may also often be an unskilled government post office worker.

== Smart national card program ==
The material required for development was unavailable. After the United States withdrawal from the Joint Comprehensive Plan of Action during the Trump presidency and US sanctions against Iran, the shortage halted the program halfway, causing the replacement national scheme to be a failure. Only 10 million cards were issued seven years later, and as of 2023 59 million persons out of the Iranian population of nearly 88 million have Iranian identity cards.

== Steps to receive an ID ==
Iranian citizens preregister on national identity card website and receive a tracking code. They must then visit the departmental office and fill in a registration form. An SMS message is then sent from the government service department office, and the card is activated and received.

== See also ==
- Iranian passport
- Identity documents in Iran
