= Iranian passport =

Travel document of the Islamic Republic of Iran

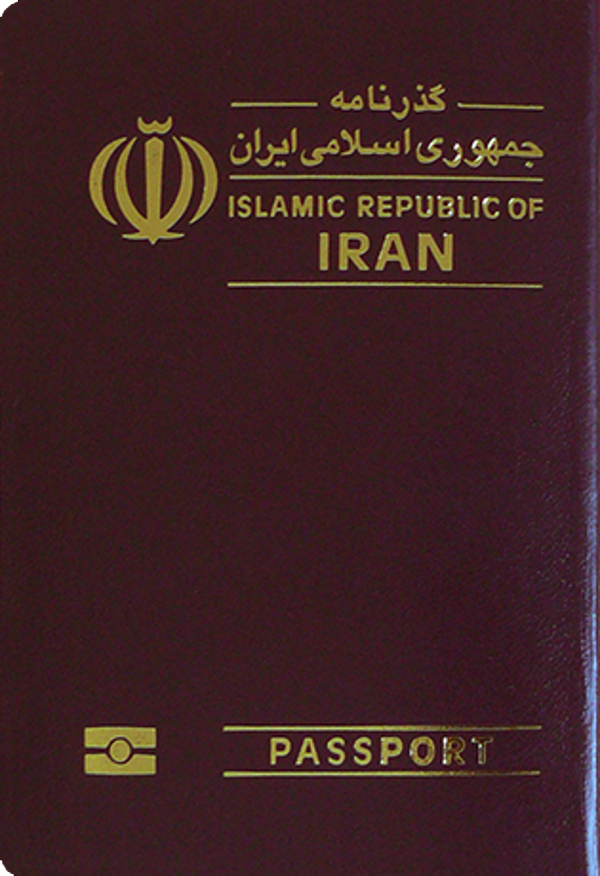
- Front cover of the current Iranian passport (with chip), issued since July 2007
- Type: Passport
- Issued by: Iran, Iranian Immigration & Passport Police Office
- First issued: c. 1925 (original); 1979 (current version); 1 January 2007 (1st biometric passport); 1 October 2014 (2nd biometric passport)
- Purpose: Identification
- Eligibility: Iranian citizenship (men over 19 require proof of compulsory military service. Not required if the only male child in the family).
- Expiration: 5 years less than a day after issued date for adults over age of 18, or 10 years for some special cases
- Cost: 4,000,000 IRR 300$ if issued by Interests Section of Iran in US
- Website: egozar.epolice.ir/passport

The Iranian passport (Persian: گذرنامه ایرانی, romanized: gozarnameh Irani) is issued to nationals of Iran for the purpose of international travel. The passport serves as a proof of Iranian citizenship. The passport is burgundy, with the emblem emblazoned on the top of the front cover.

The words "جمهوری اسلامی ایران" meaning Islamic Republic of Iran and "گذرنامه" meaning passport are inscribed to the right side of the coat of arms. Iran started issuing diplomatic and service biometric passports in July 2007. Ordinary biometric passports began to be issued on 20 February 2011. These passports contain 32 pages. 2014 passports have 16 pages.

On the inside of the back-cover, Iranian passports bear the inscription: "The holder of this passport is not entitled to travel to occupied Palestine", referring to Israel.

In the past, prior to the 1979 Iranian Revolution, passports issued by Pahlavi Iran were visually different, with the inscription "Empire of Iran" being used, and translations into French rather than English. Iran's passport is ranked one of the worst in the world for global mobility.

== Identity information page ==
The Iranian passport includes the following data:

- Holder's signature / امضا دارنده گذرنامه
- Country of residence / کشور محل اقامت
- Place of Issue / محل صدور پاسپورت (The exact place of the passport's issuance. e.g. 'Yerevan' if it's issued outside of the country, or 'Immigration and Passport Police' if it have been issued inside)
- مدرک صدور گذرنامه (an Eight Digit Code showing the Passport's number)
- Name & Position of Issuing Authority (or, in the older passports, "Name & Position of Issuing Officer) / نام و سمت صادرکننده
- ملاحظات (Does not exist in the Passports issued within the country borders. It states the last exact time of exiting Iran legally.)
- Type ('P' for passport)
- Country Code (IRN)
- Passport No. (in older passports: "Passport Number")
- شماره ملی (National ID number)
- Surname / نام خانوادگی
- Name / نام
- Father's Name / نام پدر
- Date & Place of Birth / تاریخ و محل تولد (Example: 1970-01-01 - TEHRAN or ۱۳۴۸/۱۰/۱۱ - تهران)
- Sex / جنسیت (M/مرد for male, F/زن for female)
- Date of Issue / تاریخ صدور
- Date of Expiry / تاریخ انقضا
- شماره شناسنامه (Either the old Birth Certificate number (for those who were born before 1990), or a repetition of the National ID number.)

=== Passport number ===
The passport number is the serial number that uniquely identifies a passport. The passport number changes every time a person has issued a new passport, with the previous passport number noted in an endorsement on the last page of the new passport.

The passport number is alphanumeric, with a letter followed by an eight-digit number, e.g. A00000000. In the Persian letters on top of the passport, the passport number does not have the first English letter.

=== Identity Number ===
The national identity number for Iranians is a unique 10-digit number allocated to each citizen of Iran; it is used widely for identity confirmation in many places. The unique number is in the following format:

XXX-YYYYYY-C

- The first three digits are the numeric code indicating the state of birth.
- The next six digits are randomly generated numbers
- And the last digit is known as the Check or Control Number.

The control number is calculated from the previous 9 digits and verifies if the ID number is valid.

== Online electronic system ==
In June and July of 2023, the FARAJA police system made it possible to order a passport online for Iraq for those who have an Iranian identity card. This has since been taken down, and passport-seekers have to go to police offices directly. The Iraqi travel passport is called "Pilgrim", and is 20% - 30% cheaper than a true Iraqi citizen passport.

== Languages ==
For each item in the passport, captions are provided in Persian and nearly all of them are also provided in English. Before 1995, French was also used.

== Restrictions on travel ==
As Iran (the Islamic Republic of) does not recognize or have diplomatic relations with the state of Israel (like some other Muslim countries and North Korea), people using an Iranian passport are not permitted to travel to Israel under Iranian law (although Israel itself does admit Iranian citizens holding a visa). On the inside of the back-cover, Iranian passports bear the inscription: "The holder of this passport is not entitled to travel to occupied Palestine", referring to Israel.

== Visa requirements map ==
As of January 2026, Iranian citizens had visa-free or visa on arrival access to 46 countries and territories, ranking the Iranian passport 90th in terms of travel freedom.

Visa requirements for Iranian citizens Iran Visa free access Visa on arrival eVisa Visa available both on arrival or online Access to some regions Visa required Admission refused

Iranians were also temporarily denied admission by former US President Donald Trump in early 2017 as part of the Trump travel ban. Exemptions for academic visas and waivers from consular officials were eventually allowed before being lifted in its entirety by Trump's successor Joe Biden upon assuming office in 2021.

== History ==
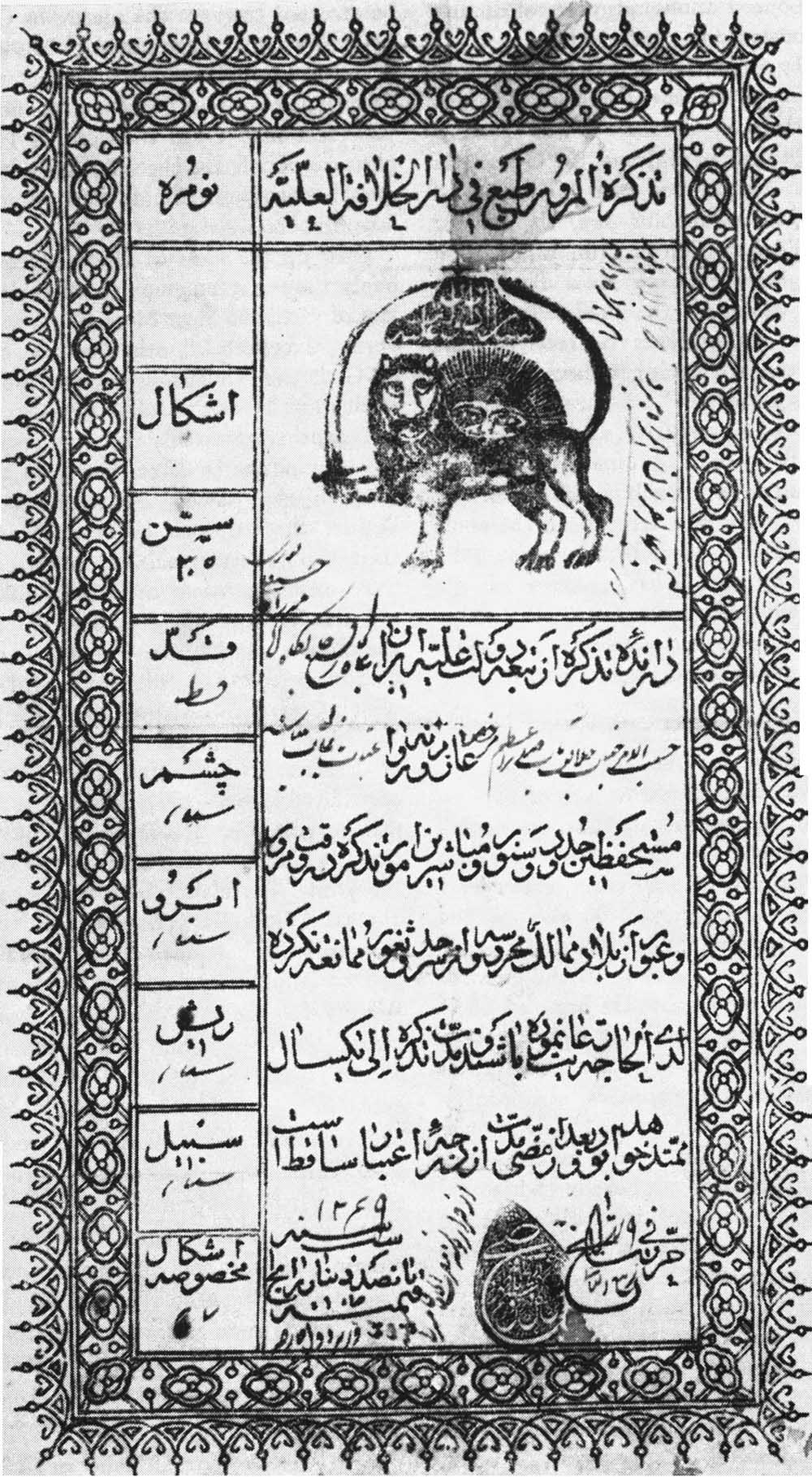
Persian passport dated 1892

The first Persian passport was issued during the reign of Nasereddin Shah around 1885. It used to be called 'Tazkereh-ye Safar' (Travel Document) and the text was entirely in Persian. During the reign of Ahmad Shah (early 20th-century) the French titles were added to the document "Passeport du passage: au nom de Sa Majeste Imperiale le Shahinschah de Perse" (Passport of the Passage: in the name of His Imperial Majesty the Shahanshah of Persia). After 1935 the title was changed to "Empire de l'Iran".

== Gallery ==
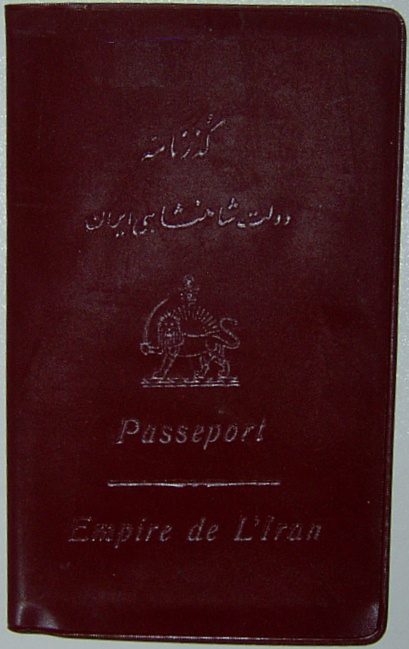
Iranian Passport/Empire Passport from 1975

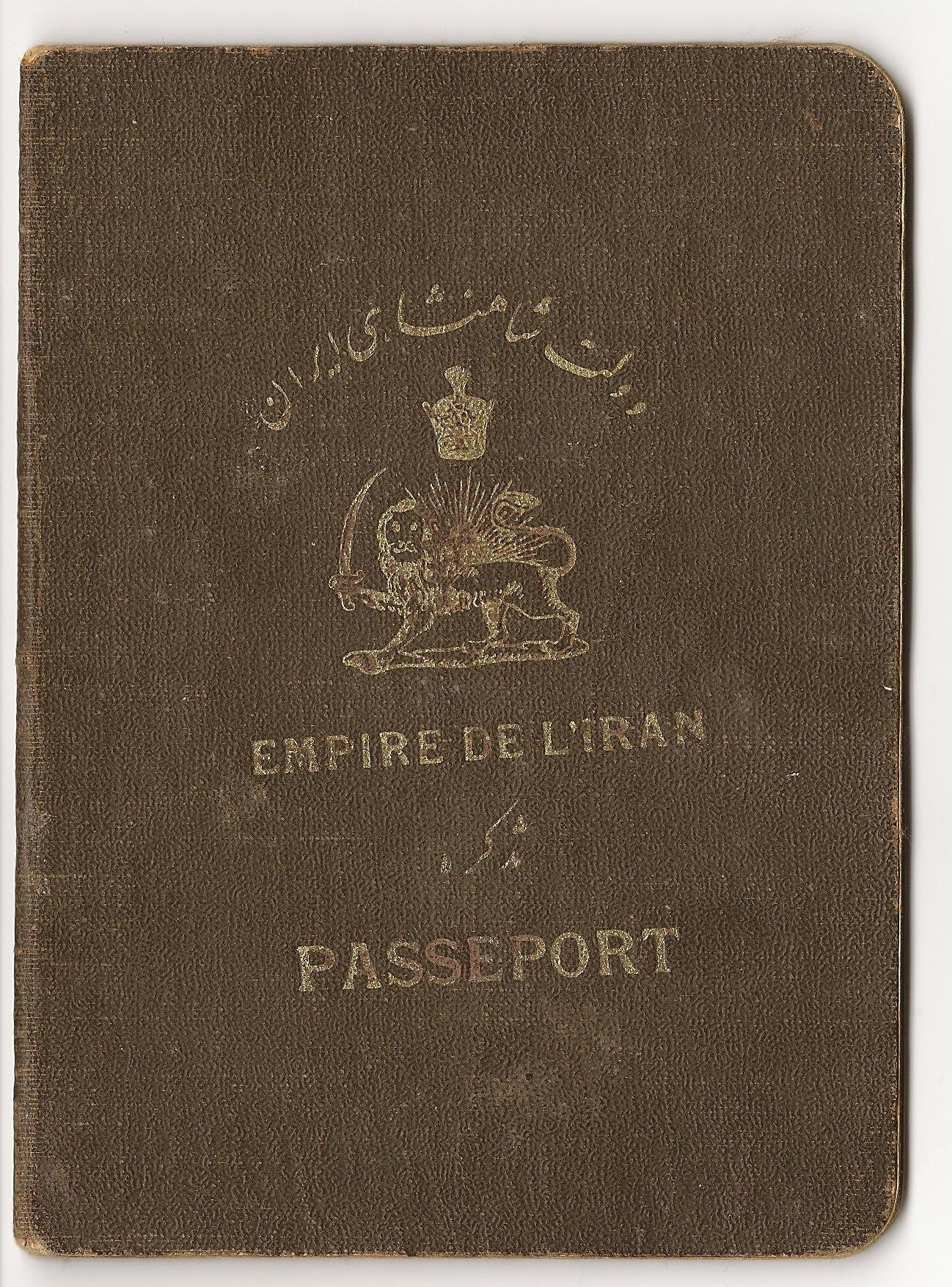
Empire Passport Cover.

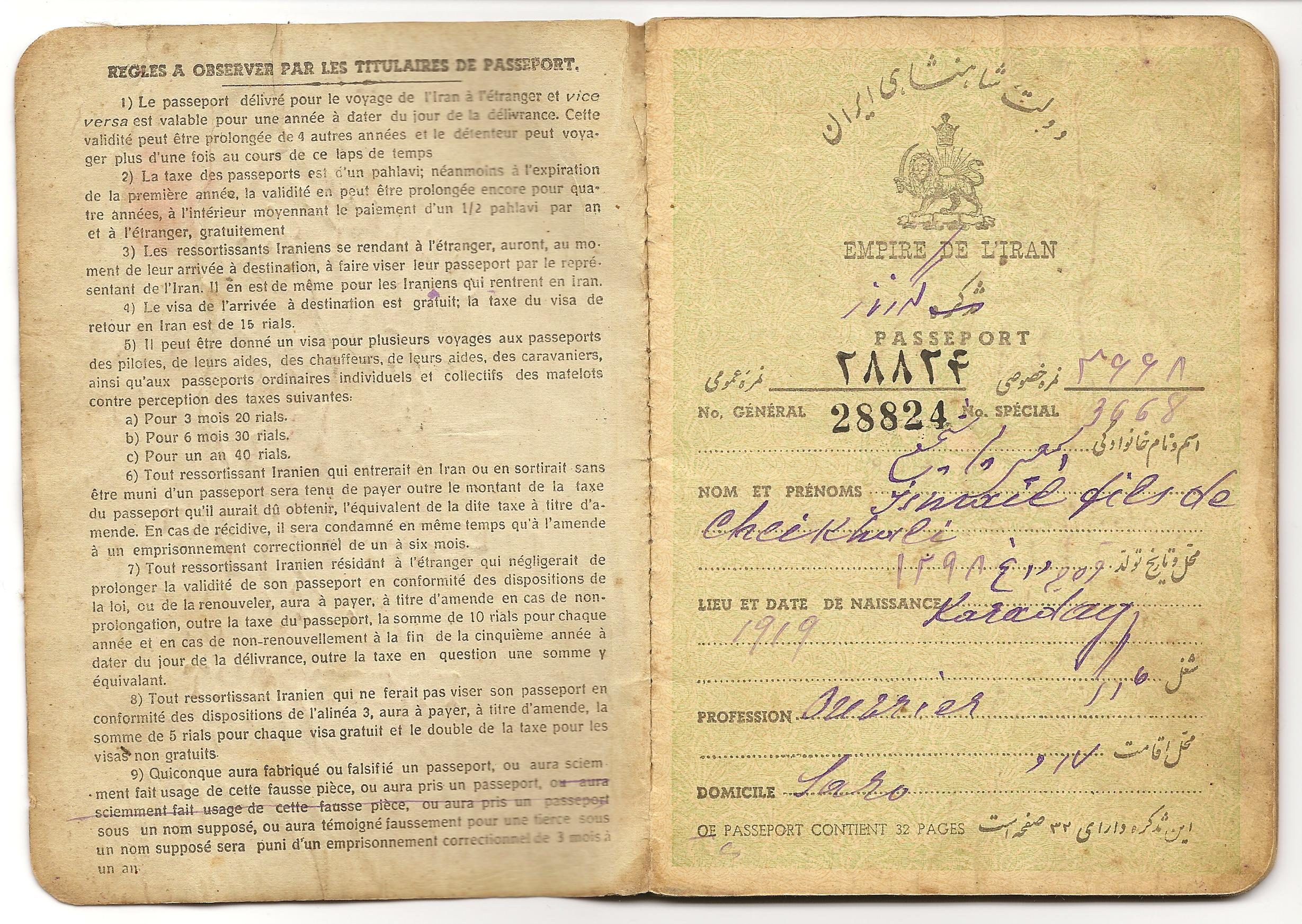
Empire Passport - 'Rules to be observed by passport bearer' (French language).

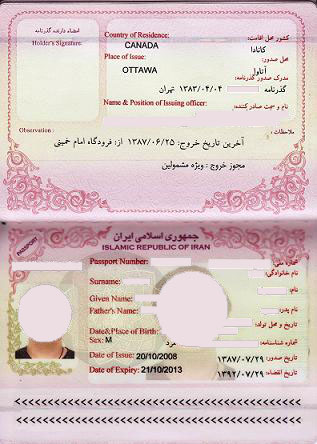
Iranian Passport Datapage

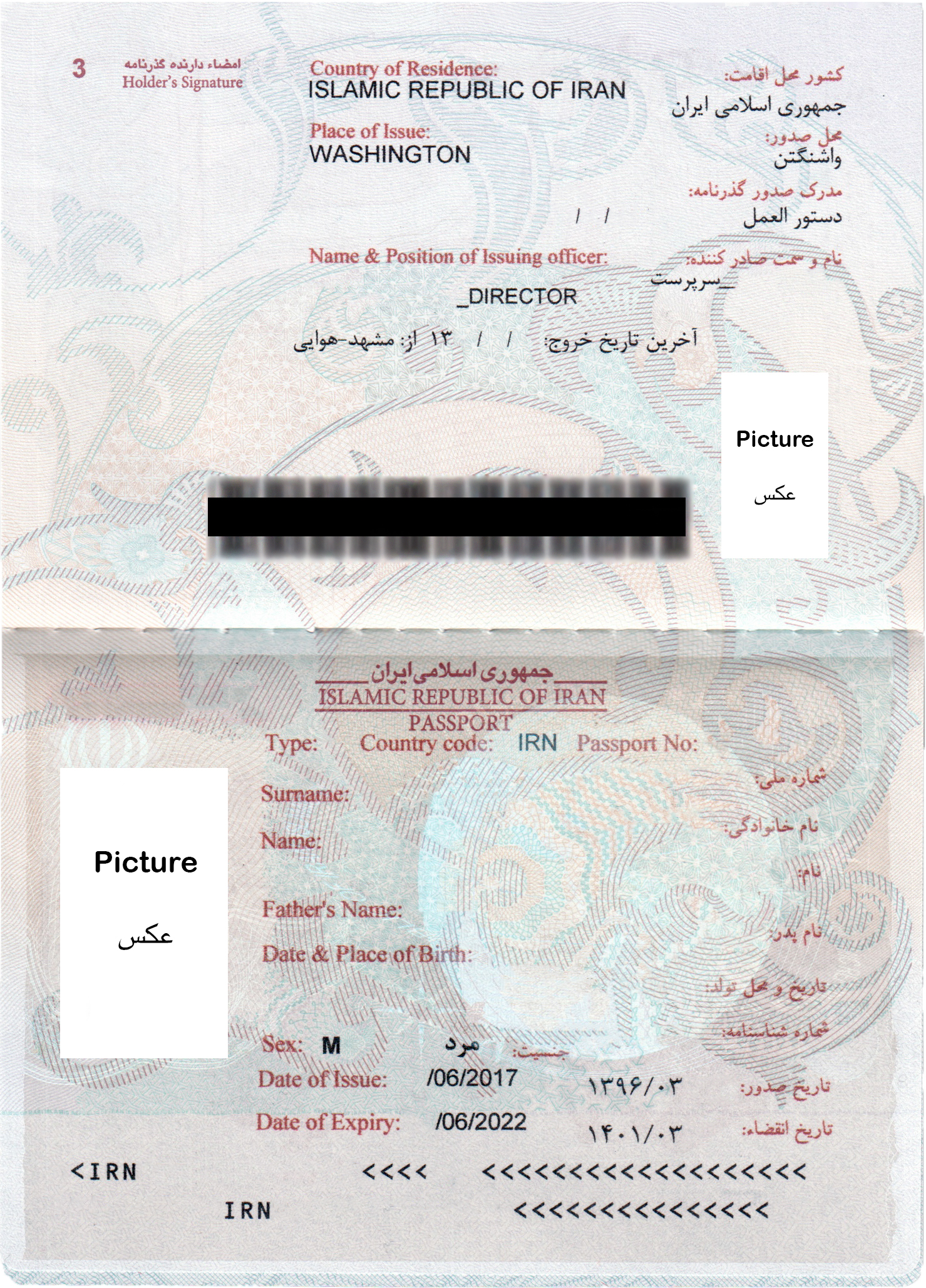
Iranian Passport DataPage (2017)

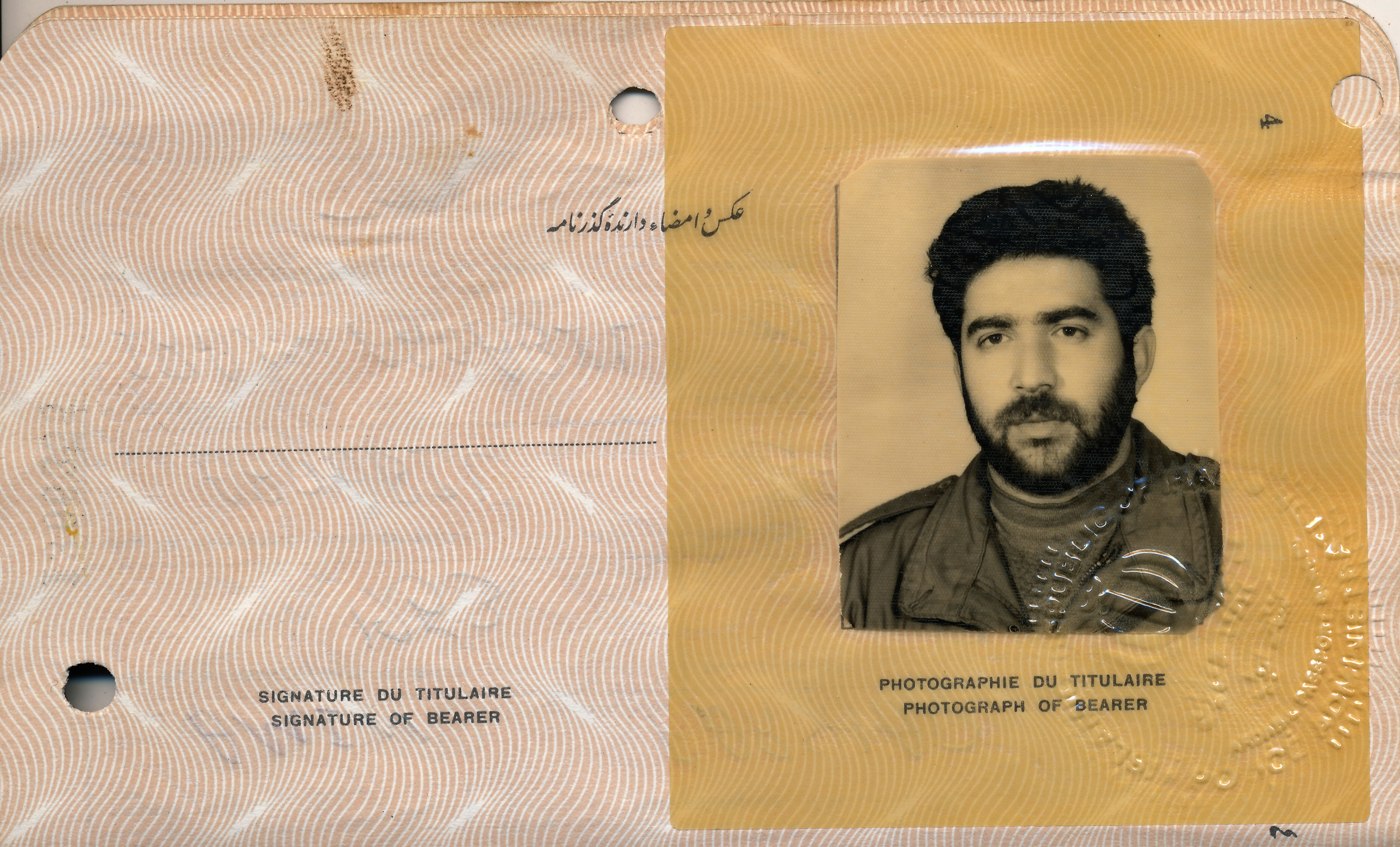
Photo page of an Iranian passport, 1992

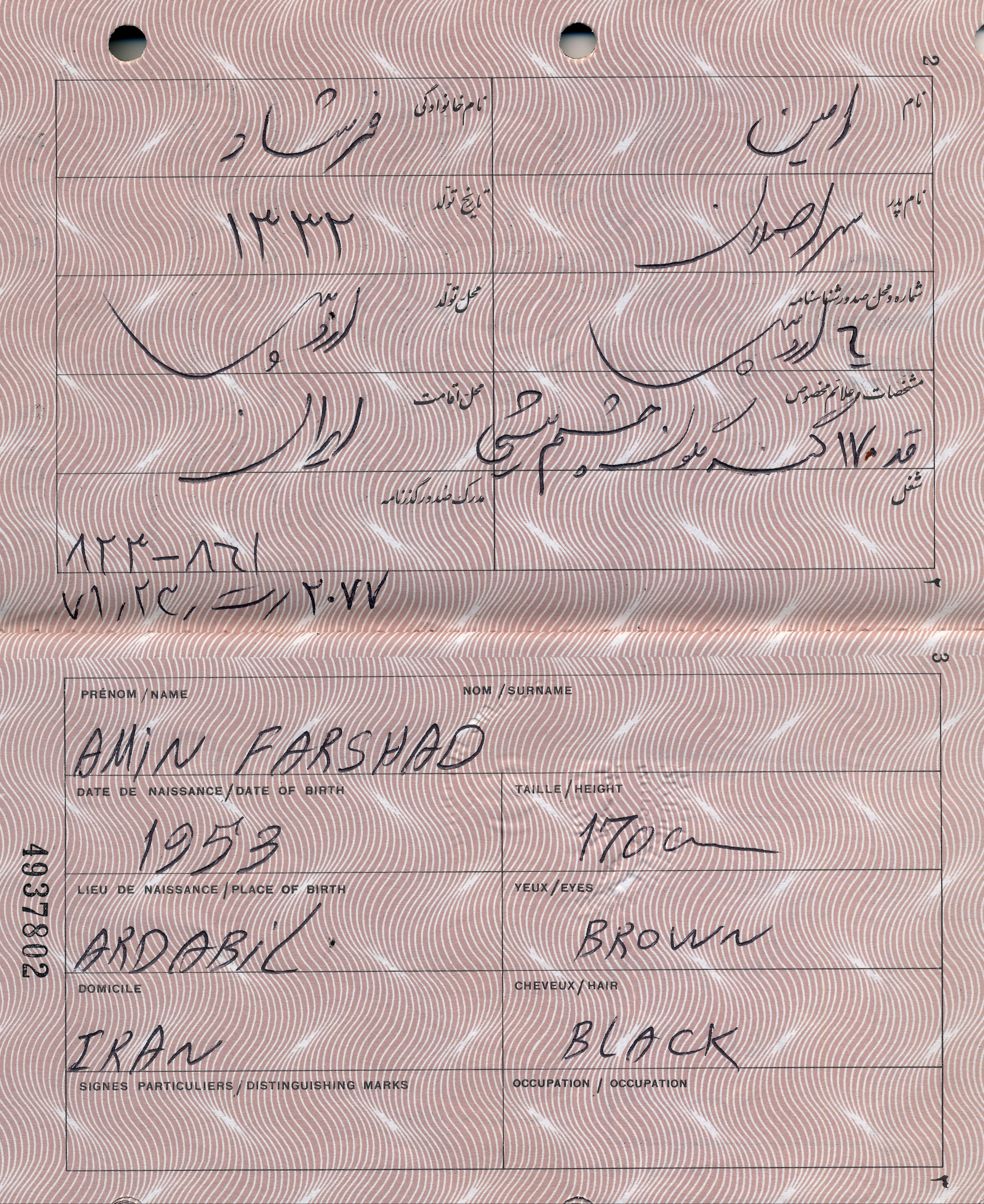
Iranian passport from 1992

== See also ==
- Iranian national identity card
- Visa requirements for Iranian citizens
- Visa policy of Iran
- Iranian nationality law
- Identity documents in Iran
- List of passports
