= Iranian nationality law =

Iranian Citizenship Act

Parliament of Iran
- Long title: An Act relating to Iranian citizenship
- Enacted by: Government of Iran
- Status: Current legislation

Nationality law of the Islamic Republic of Iran contains principles of both jus sanguinis and jus soli.

The full nationality law is defined in Book 2 of the Civil Code of Iran, Articles 976 through 991.

== Definition of Iranian nationals ==
Article 976 of the Civil Code of Iran defines who is an Iranian national:

1. All residing in Iran except those whose foreign nationality is established; the foreign nationality of such persons is considered to be established if their documents of nationality have not been objected to by the Iranian Government.
2. Those born in Iran or outside whose father is Iranian.
3. Those born in Iran of unknown parentage.
4. People born in Iran of foreign parents, one of whom was also born in Iran.
5. People born in Iran of a father of foreign nationality who have resided at least one more year in Iran immediately after reaching the full age of 18; in other cases their naturalization as Iranian subjects will be subject to the stipulations for Iranian naturalization laid down by the law. New legislation passed by the Iranian Parliament in 2012 grants permanent residency to children born to Iranian mothers and foreign fathers.
6. Every woman of foreign nationality who marries an Iranian husband.
7. Every foreign national who has obtained Iranian nationality.

== Citizenship transfer through mother ==
A new policy allowing Iranian women to pass down their citizenship to their children at birth started to effect from 2020. As of mid-November, at least 150,000 people had applied for citizenship under the new law.

== Naturalisation ==
An application for naturalisation must be submitted to either directly to the Ministry of Foreign Affairs, or through the Governors, or the Governors-General and must contain certified copies of identity documents in relation to the applicant and his family (wife and children), a certificate certifying the period of residence, a clean criminal record, sufficient property, and employment that ensures a livelihood.

== Deprivation of citizenship, dual nationality ==
Iran does not recognize dual nationality, and considers dual citizens as Iranian citizens only. Nevertheless, Article 977 of the Civil Code of Iran deals with multiple citizenship. As a consequence of Paragraphs 2, 4, or 5 of article 976, some Iranian minors may have multiple citizenship. If those who have attained citizenship under Clause 4 wish to retain the non-Iranian nationality after age 18, they have to inform Iran's Ministry of Foreign Affairs.

In theory, voluntary renunciation of Iranian citizenship is possible for persons over the age of 25, subject to approval by the Council of Ministers. However this rarely occurs in practical terms.

== Travel freedom ==
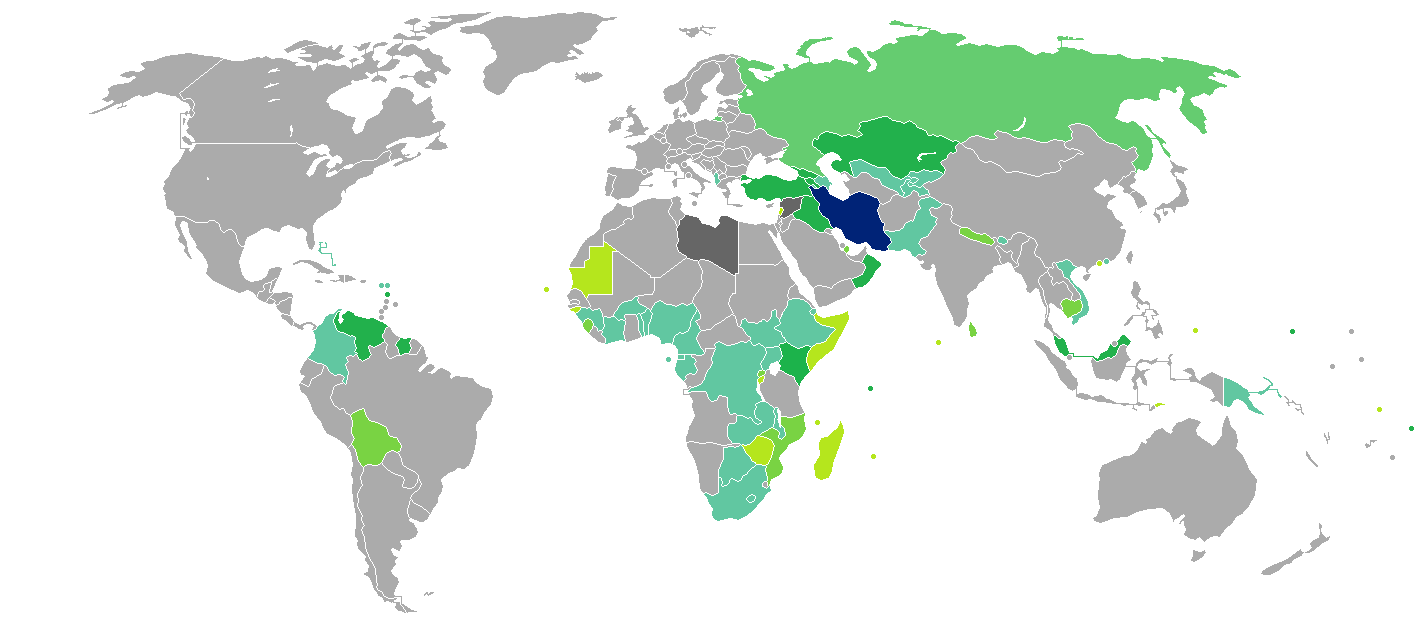
Visa requirements for Iranian citizens Iran Visa free access Visa on arrival eVisa Visa available both on arrival or online Visa required Admission refused

In 2016, Iranian citizens had visa-free or visa on arrival access to 37 countries and territories, ranking the Iranian passport 98th in the world according to the Henley Passport Index.

== See also ==
- Iranian passport
- National immigration organization
