= Iran-US conflict =

The term "Iran-US conflict" might refer to:

- 2026 Iran war, an ongoing armed conflict in the Middle East
- Twelve-Day War, 2025 war in West Asia
- Iran-US relations, bilateral reations
