= Manalang =

Manalang is a Filipino surname. Notable people with the surname include:

- Angela Manalang-Gloria (1907–1995), Filipina writer
- Efren Manalang Reyes (born 1954), Filipino pool player
- Noli Principe Manalang (born 1980), Filipino painter
