= Eric Parnes =

American painter

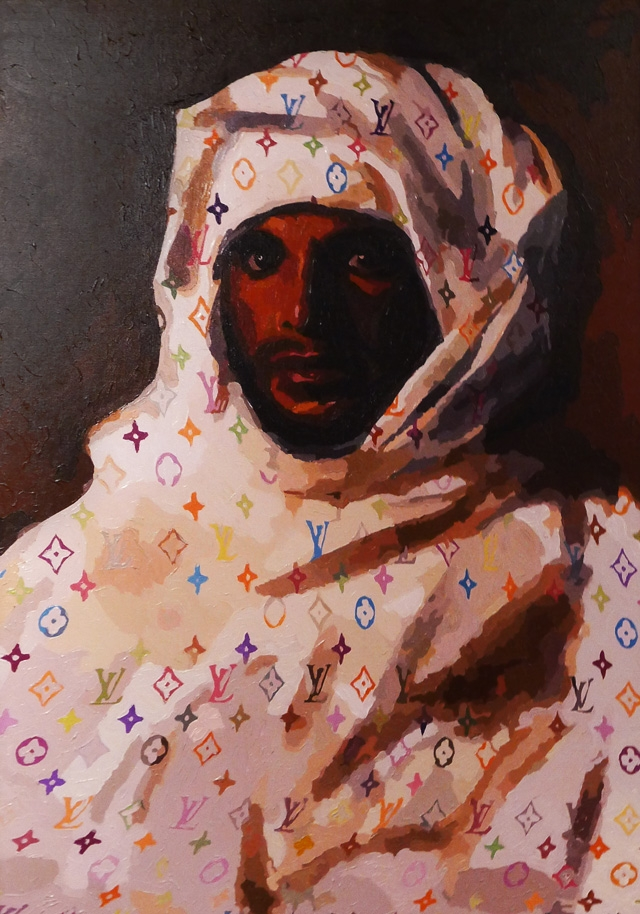
- Neo Orientalist (2011)
- Born: 1979
- Education: NYU
- Known for: Mixed Media, Sculpture, Painting, Photography, Installation art

Eric Parnes (also known as Eric Esmail Parnes) (Persian: اریک اسماعیل پارنسی) (born 1979) is an Iranian American contemporary artist based in New York City. His work consists of mixed media, sculptures, paintings, photography, and installation art. He uses well-known logos and corporate branding in his art in order to examine Middle Eastern culture and its relationship to globalization.

== Early life ==
Parnes grew up in Baltimore, Maryland. He received an undergraduate degree and a Master of Arts from New York University.

== Career ==
Parnes has created multimedia art which incorporates his cultural and ethnic heritage as an American of Iranian descent. He explores the use of Oriental imagery in the appropriation of it within the West and the East and in both the past and the present. Elements found in Parnes' art include: ancient and modern history; mysticism; war; and fashion. He alters the context of the logos of corporate brands, such as Chanel, Louis Vuitton, Ferrari, Puma, Citibank, Subway, and Burger King. He does this to express a view of corporate influence and how its relationship with traditional cultures has developed.

Parnes serves as a select member of the Artist Pension Trust founded by businessman Moti Shniberg, professor Dan Galai, and David A. Ross, former director of the Whitney Museum, The San Francisco Museum of Modern Art and Institute of Contemporary Art, Boston. APT functions to curate exhibitions for museums including the Museum of Modern Art (MoMA), Tate Modern, Hirshhorn Museum, the Venice Biennale, Art Basel, Documenta and Manifesta.

=== Neo-orientalist ===
Parnes' artistic work explores what he calls neo-orientalism, a reexamination of Orientalism. When asked in Adweek magazine about the Orient Parnes stated that "he does not condemn nor support such change as commonly perceived...[y]ou really do see men in dishdashas smoking and wearing Nike sneakers...and they’re probably wearing Versace underwear beneath it all. He seeks to redefine orientalism (depiction of the Middle Eastern and the West). Parnes has legally registered the term neo-orientalist as a Trademark.

== Works ==
=== World Trade Center project ===
World Trade Center (2001), is created with rubble from the World Trade Center. The work appeared on the cover of the online edition of The New York Times. In September 2011, World Trade Center was displayed in The New York Times Building as part of The New York Times 10-year memorial exhibition of the destruction of the World Trade Center.

=== I Dream of Jeannie: I See Demons ===
In 2012, The Galleries, Katara Cultural Village, West Bay, Doha and The Pearl, Qatar invited Parnes to create an installation for the I Dream of Jeannie: I See Demons exhibition. Through mediums including sculpture, photography and paintings, Parnes reintroduces the subtle Middle Eastern origins of I Dream of Jeannie, the American television situation comedy. The name of the television program is a play on the French word "genie", derived from the Arabic word Jinn (a supernatural being). The Jinn, mentioned in the Quran, is identified with mischief-making and trouble-doing. A Persian translation of I Dream of Jeannie is "I See Demons."

=== Custodian of Vacancy: The Iranian Embassy in the USA ===
Empty Seat at Embassy Row (2013).

In January 2014, the Ayyam Gallery premiered at their DIFC location in Dubai an exhibition of Eric Parnes' photographs of the remaining interiors of the Former Embassy of Iran in Washington, D.C. The building has been "long and abandoned", and still is, shuttered and inaccessible in over three decades since its closure circa 1979-1980 with the Iranian Revolution and the resulting severance of dialogue with the United States due to the Iran Hostage Crisis . Parnes' imagery showcases the remaining visual legacy of the Embassy, renowned for its active social presence in the 1960s and 1970s as an immensely popular party destination in Washington, D.C. under the leadership of then-Ambassador Ardeshir Zahedi, who was interviewed during the exhibition about Parnes stating “We have had a long friendship,” he said. “Iran and the U.S., they need each other. They may be friends; they must be friends.”. Frequent political and celebrity guests included Barbra Streisand, Elizabeth Taylor, Frank Sinatra, Sen. Edward "Ted" Kennedy, Secretary of State Henry Kissinger and Andy Warhol.Barbara Walters wrote: "The number one embassy when it came to extravagance and just plain enjoyment was the Iranian Embassy." Parnes' stylized photographs, on the other hand, now show an empty, dark building yet that still holds remarkably preserved elements of elaborate Persian mosaics and mirrored rooms amidst the general decay.

=== Dream a Little Dream and 1000 Nights and One Day ===
Curated by David Elliott, the 2014 edition of the Moscow Biennale for Young Art, at the MMOMA, a massive red neon sign using words from Martin Luther King Jr.’s "I Have a Dream" speech and intertwined with the 1989 Hollywood movie Dream a Little Dream was installed.

Parnes was a featured artist at Robert Wilson's Watermill Center.
