= Noli Principe Manalang =

Filipino hyperrealist painter (born 1980)

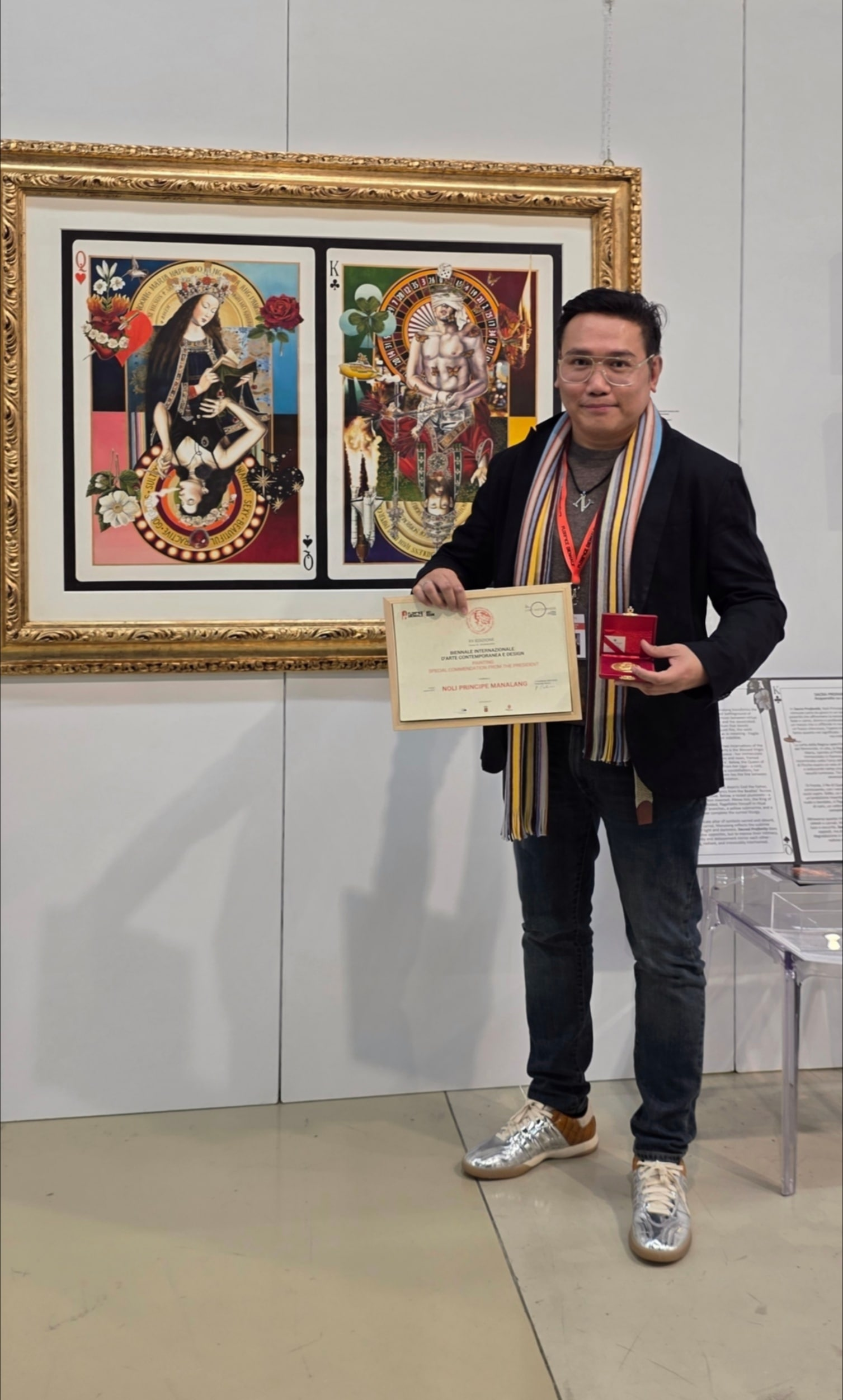
- Born: 1980 (age 45–46)
- Education: University of Santo Tomas (UST)
- Occupations: Painter, jewelry designer, vestment artist

Noli Principe Manalang (born 1980) is a Filipino artist from Bulacan province, the Philippines. Although a graduate of Architecture from the Royal Pontifical University of Santo Tomas in 2000, he is known for acrylic and watercolor paintings of traditional Roman Catholic imagery inspired by his alma mater. He has been embellishing three-dimensional church artworks with his kind of hyperrealism, including one given to a chapel in the Czech Republic by the Philippine Chargé d’affaires in 2017.

Manalang is multi-awarded. He has been a constant fixture in the winner circle of the Art Association of the Philippines’ Annual Art Competition, the Metrobank Art and Design Excellence Competition, Philip Morris’ Philippine Art Awards, the GSIS Painting Competition, the NCCA Diwa ng Sining Award, and the Shell National Students Art Competition, to name a few. The provincial government of Bulacan also bestowed on Manalang the province's "Gintong Kabataan for Visual Arts " (Golden Youth for Visual Arts) honor. The recognition paid tribute to Manalang's hard work and art advocacies in his birthplace. Manalang was also elevated to the Hall of Fame in the "Kulay sa Tubig" Annual Invitational Watercolor Competition, the Philippines’ premier watercolor contest, for winning in three consecutive years. He was also a recipient of an art residency program from the Freeman Foundation’s Asian Artists Fellowship in Vermont, USA, where he exhibited his works at the Vermont Studio Center in Johnson, Vermont.

Apart from variously exhibiting in Metro Manila, Manalang has also exhibited in New York City. Some of his works have also been auctioned on Artnet and MutualArt, and have been represented by galleries in the Philippines including Altro Mondo.

In 2019, he was chosen to be a part of diskurso.com's Apropiación show at J Studio, La Fuerza Plaza, on Chino Roces Avenue. He has been chosen to represent the Philippines in the XVI Florence Biennale 2023, which will be held at Fortezza de Basso on 12–24 October 2023.

In the XV Biennale Internazionale dell’Arte Contemporanea di Firenze (Florence Biennale 2025), Filipino artist Noli Principe Manalang received a special commendation by the president in the Painting category, becoming the first Filipino painter in the Biennale’s history to be honored with this distinction. The recognition, conferred by President Pasquale Celona, acknowledged Manalang’s watercolor painting Sacred Profanity for its conceptual depth and mastery of a notoriously challenging medium. The work explores the tension between light and darkness—reflecting the Biennale’s 2025 theme, “The Sublime Essence of Light and Darkness: Concepts of Dualism and Unity in Contemporary Art and Design.With this award also, his hometown, Bocaue, a province in Bulacan, recognized his special award by passing a Municipal Resolution acknowledging and praising his special grant due to his skills and talents.

== Style and themes ==
Through an arresting visual approach, Manalang's body of works speaks of a contemporary metacognition of the Filipino psyche while also mirroring the diverse cultural influences of the Filipino nation.

== Other works ==
Manalang is also a jewelry designer. He was recognized during the 6th Hiyas Jewelry Design and Manufacturing Competition where he was endorsed as an emerging jewelry artist of his generation. Manalang also dabbles in ecclesiastical jewelry and vestment art. Creating pieces in collaboration with other artists in the field, he is part of reviving thiscultural tradition, where the mission is to create art that touches the lives of the viewer and reconnects the on-looker with the Divine.

== Gallery ==
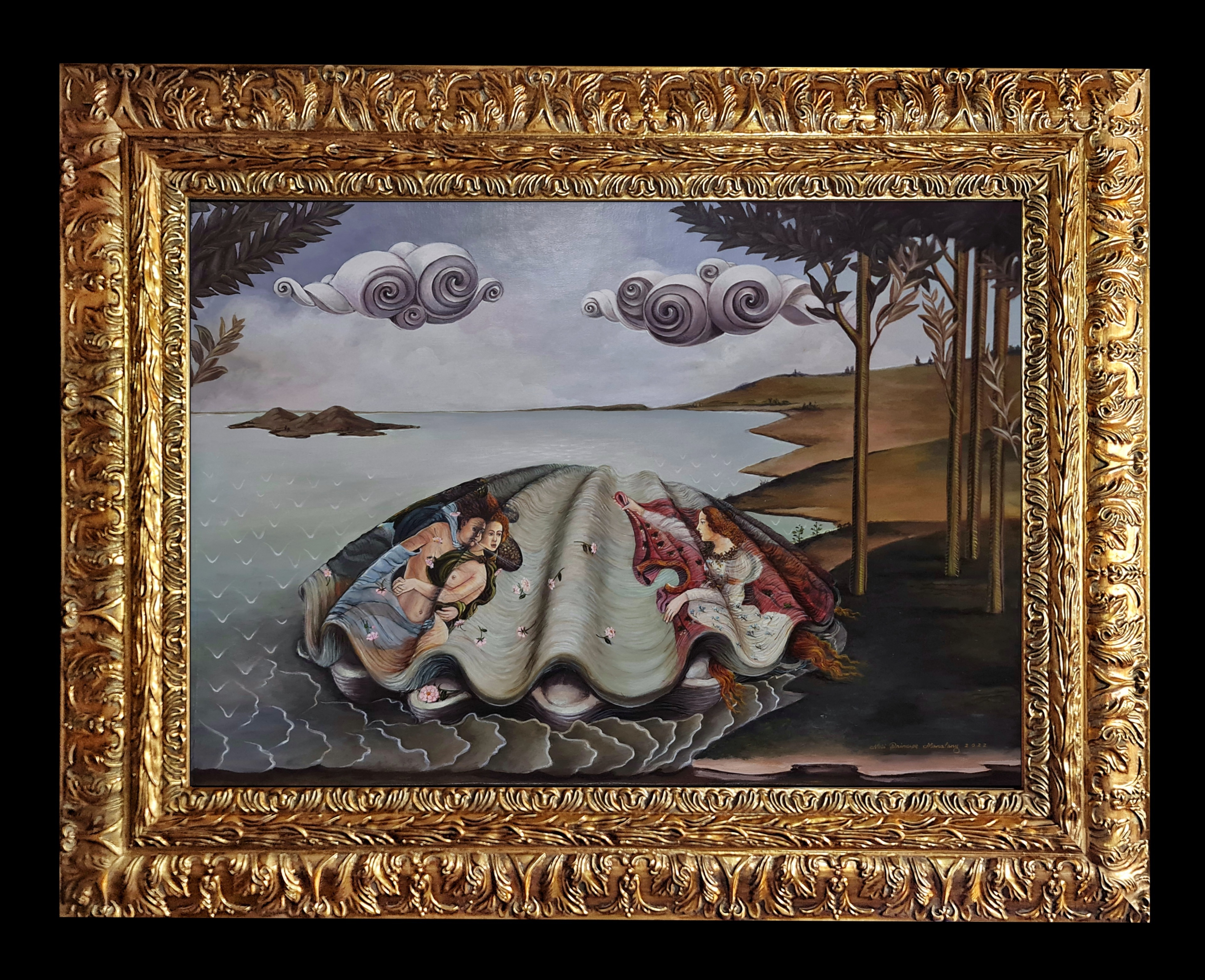
Anadyomene, 2022, acrylic on canvas, 17" x 23" (43cm x 58cm)

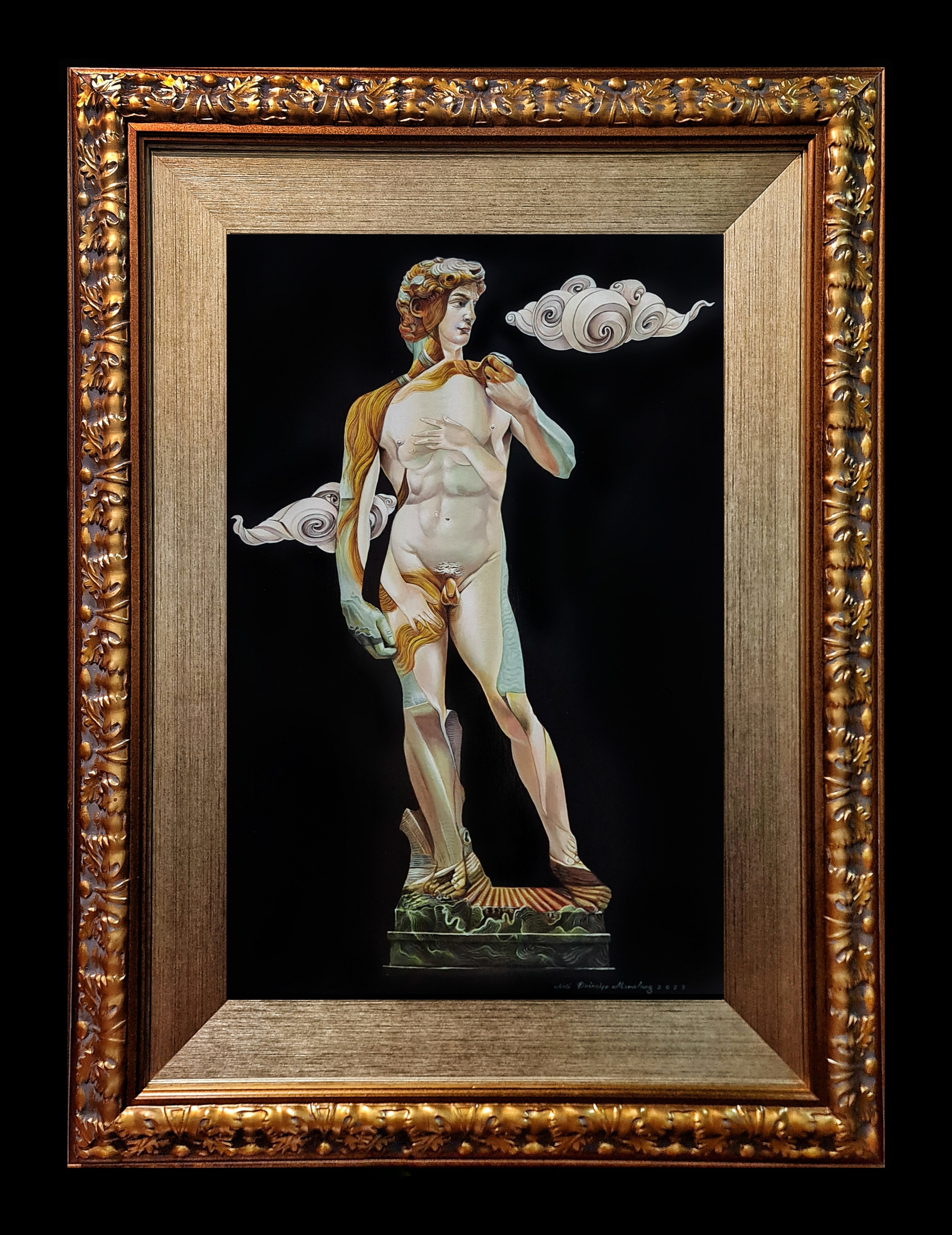
Androgyny, 2023, acrylic on canvas, 30" x 20" (76cm x 51cm)

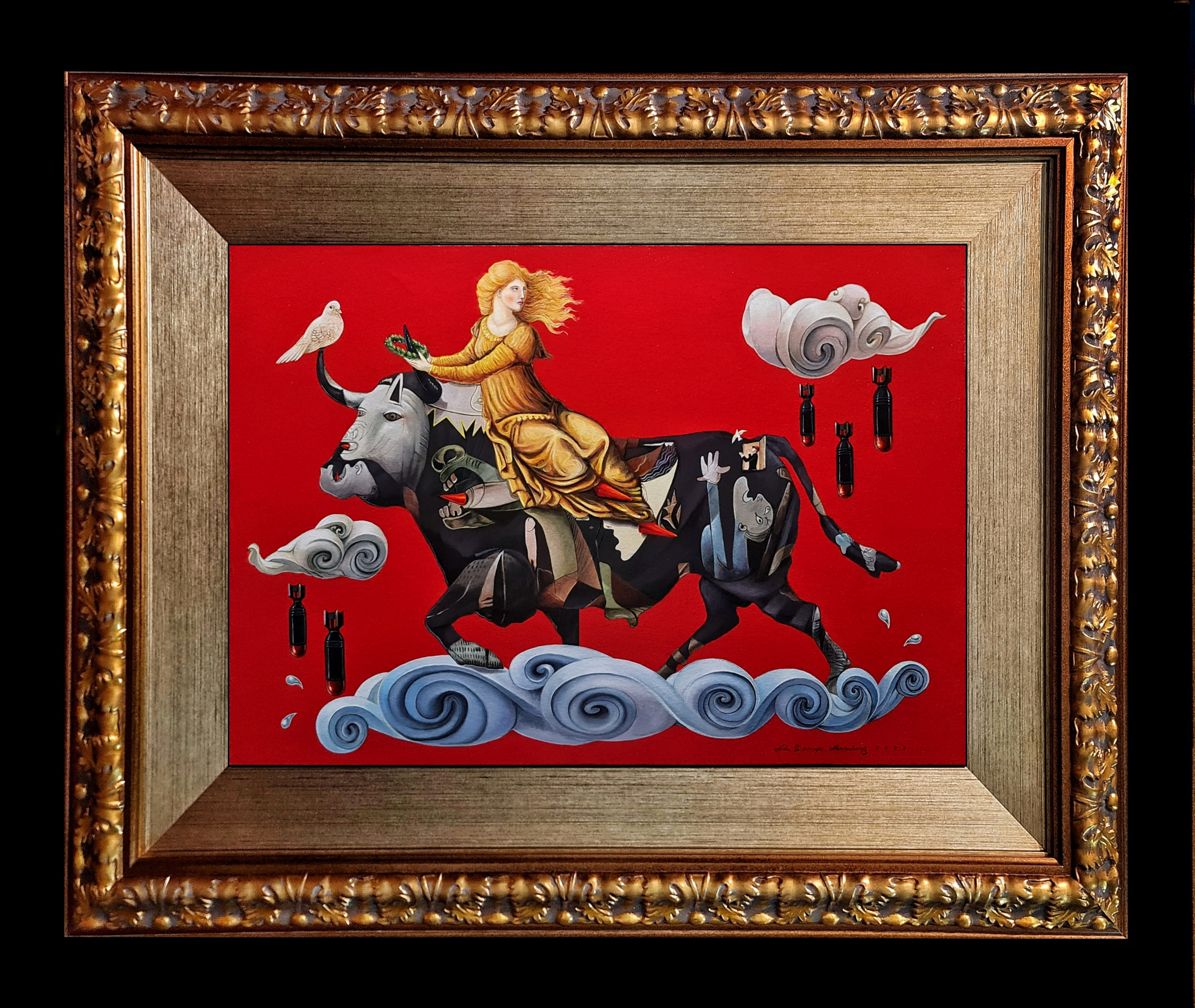
Europa, 2022, acrylic on canvas, 24" x 36" (60cm x 90cm)

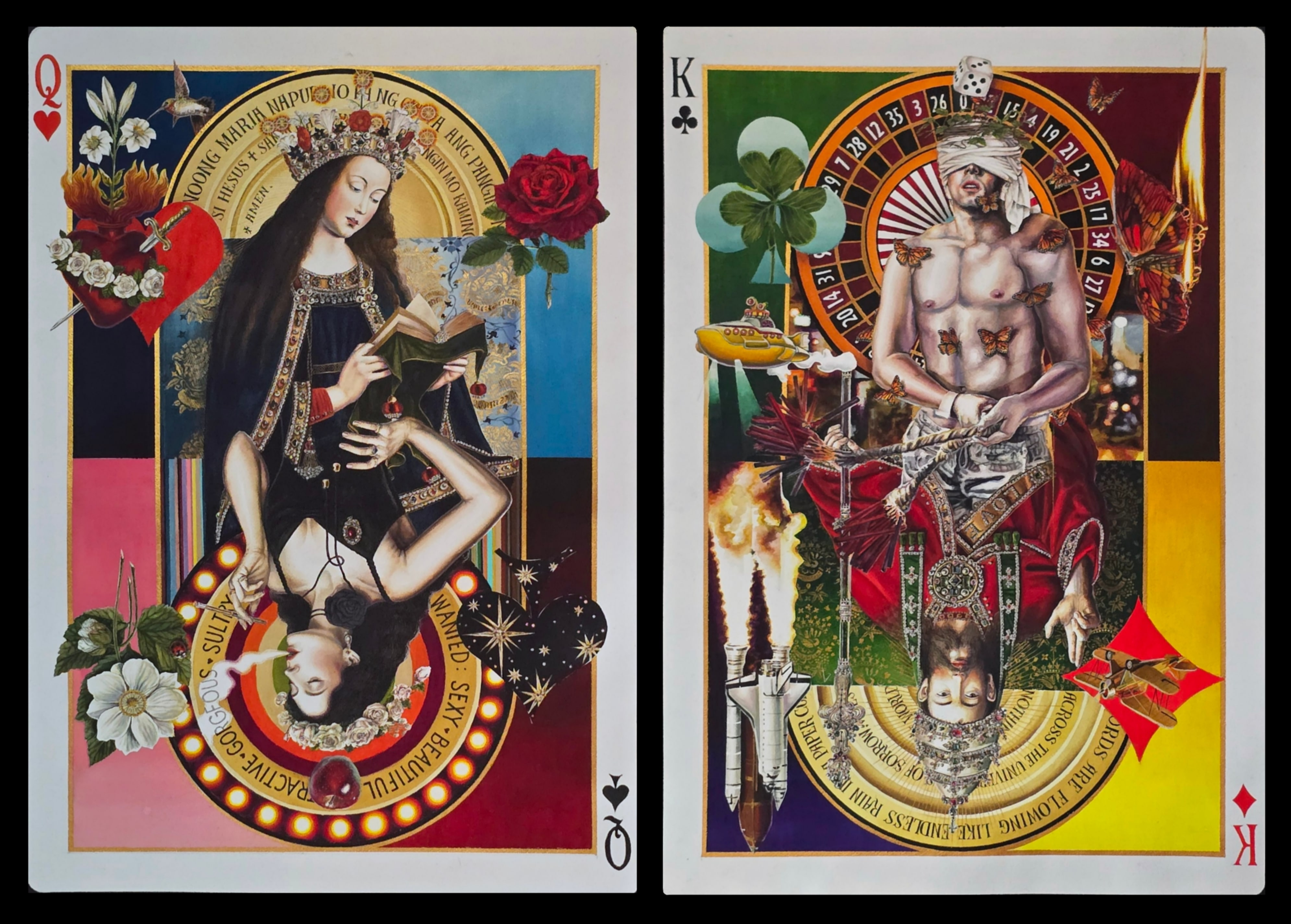
Sacred Profanity, 2025, Watercolor on paper, 31" x 40"
