= Arthur Millspaugh =

American trade advisor (1883–1955)

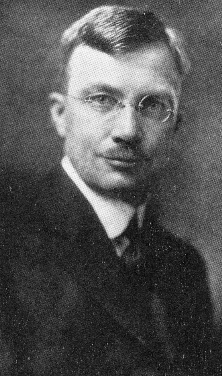
Arthur Millspaugh, Late Treasurer-General of Persia.

Arthur Chester Millspaugh, PhD, (1883–1955) was a former adviser at the U.S. State Department's Office of the Foreign Trade, who was hired to re-organize the Finance Ministry of Iran from 1922 to 1927 in the government of Reza Shah, and from 1942 to 1945 in the government of Mohammad Reza Shah.

With his help, Iran became independent of foreign loans to maintain its economy. Before World War II the Iranian public viewed the United States as a liberator from British and Russian dominance, as well as the country which would make Iran prosperous and rich. Up until the Cold War, Millspaugh tried, unsuccessfully, to influence the U.S. State Department's policies toward Iran.

He was born at Augusta, Michigan, and educated at Albion College, the University of Illinois, and Johns Hopkins. After teaching political science for two years and working in the drafting office of the United States State Department for three more, he became acting foreign trade adviser in 1921–22. When Persia requested that an American financial adviser be sent to Tehran, Dr. Millspaugh was appointed, and he and his staff reached the Persian capital in November, 1922. He found the Persian treasury empty and the fiscal administration in chaos, but with the help of the Persian authorities and the military, he straightened matters out. A budget was established, taxes were collected, and brigandage greatly diminished.

As Administrator-General of Finances of Iran, he brought positive results in balancing the Iranian budget, further strengthening the American case in Iranian government circles. Iranian government officials were grateful to Millspaugh by whom appreciable reduction was effected in the monthly deficit of the Iranian Government account.

He worked in Tehran for four years, and again returned in 1942 by the invitation of Iran's 13th Majles.

Despite being given temporary legislative authority, Millspaugh's reforms were unable to rejuvenate the Iranian economy. Reza Shah terminated the authority on grounds of Millspaugh's repeated noncompliance with the Shah's requests for increased military expenditure.

Millspaugh managed to implement a number of reforms, including a new taxation law that hit the poor hard but financed Reza Shah's Trans-Iranian Railway project, which got underway in 1927. The mission's accomplishments were repeatedly hampered by internal political rivalries in Iran and a widespread system of patronage and graft among many leading Iranian politicians.

Fancying himself the successor to Morgan Shuster's unfulfilled legacy of restructuring Iran's economy, in 1925 Millspaugh published a book on his assignment in Iran, "The American Task in Persia".

Discussing Iran's shattered economy, Millspaugh's book sympathetically portrayed Iran and Iranians, but heaped criticism on the Iranian bureaucracy. "The American task in Persia" was highly influential in shaping American political opinion towards Iran. Commentaries on Iran appearing in American foreign policy journals, such as Foreign Affairs and Foreign Policy Reports, or in leading journals such as Time magazine, frequently relied on Millspaugh's accounts as a principal source.

In 1942 Millspaugh headed another financial mission, this time clearly connected with the U. S. State Department. His mission was hampered again by internal political rivalries in Iran, the entrenched vested interests of the Iranian political elite (economic, military, political, and tribal), and frequent cabinet reshuffles in Tehran with seesawing political orientations (with 11 prime ministers between 1941 and 1946). The financial mission under Millspaugh's supervision again became a source of irritation between Tehran and Washington and had to be terminated in 1945.

In 1946, his second book on Iran, Americans in Persia, was published by the policy think-tank Brookings Institution. Replete with "clinical" metaphors, and speaking from experience from his days working for the Shah's government, Millspaugh this time was more pessimistic and critical of Iranians, portraying them as incapable of self-government:

"Persia cannot be left to herself, even if the Russians were to keep their hands off politically. ...Persia has never yet proved its capacity for independent self-government." (p 243 of his second book)

== See also ==
- Money doctor

== Bibliography ==
- The American task in Persia, New York, Arno Press, 1925.
- Americans in Persia, Washington, D.C., The Brookings Institution, 1946.
- Crime control by the national government, Washington, D.C., The Brookings Institution, 1937.
- Democracy, efficiency, stability; an appraisal of American government, Washington, D.C., The Brookings Institution, 1942.
- Haiti under American control, 1915–1930, Boston, Mass., World peace foundation. 1931.
- Local democracy and crime control, Washington, D.C., The Brookings Institution, 1936.
- Party organization and machinery in Michigan since 1890, Baltimore, The Johns Hopkins Press, 1917.
- Peace plans and American choices; the pros and cons of world order, Washington, D.C., The Brookings institution, 1942.
- Public welfare organization, The Brookings institution, 1935.
- Toward efficient democracy; the question of governmental organization, Washington, D.C., Brookings Institution, 1949.

== See also ==
- United States-Iran relations
- Morgan Shuster
- Famous Americans in Iran

== Sources ==
- U. S.-Iranian Relations: 1911-1951, M. Bonakdarian
- The Contemporary Political History of Iran, Dr. S. Jalaledin Madani.
- 'Alí Rizā Awsatí (عليرضا اوسطى), Iran in the Past Three Centuries (Irān dar Se Qarn-e Goz̲ashteh - ايران در سه قرن گذشته), Volume 2 p 661–664. (Paktāb Publishing - انتشارات پاکتاب, Tehran, Iran, 2003). ISBN 964-93406-5-3.
