= Embassy of Iran, Washington, D.C. =

Imperial State of Iran's diplomatic mission to the United States

Embassy of Iran
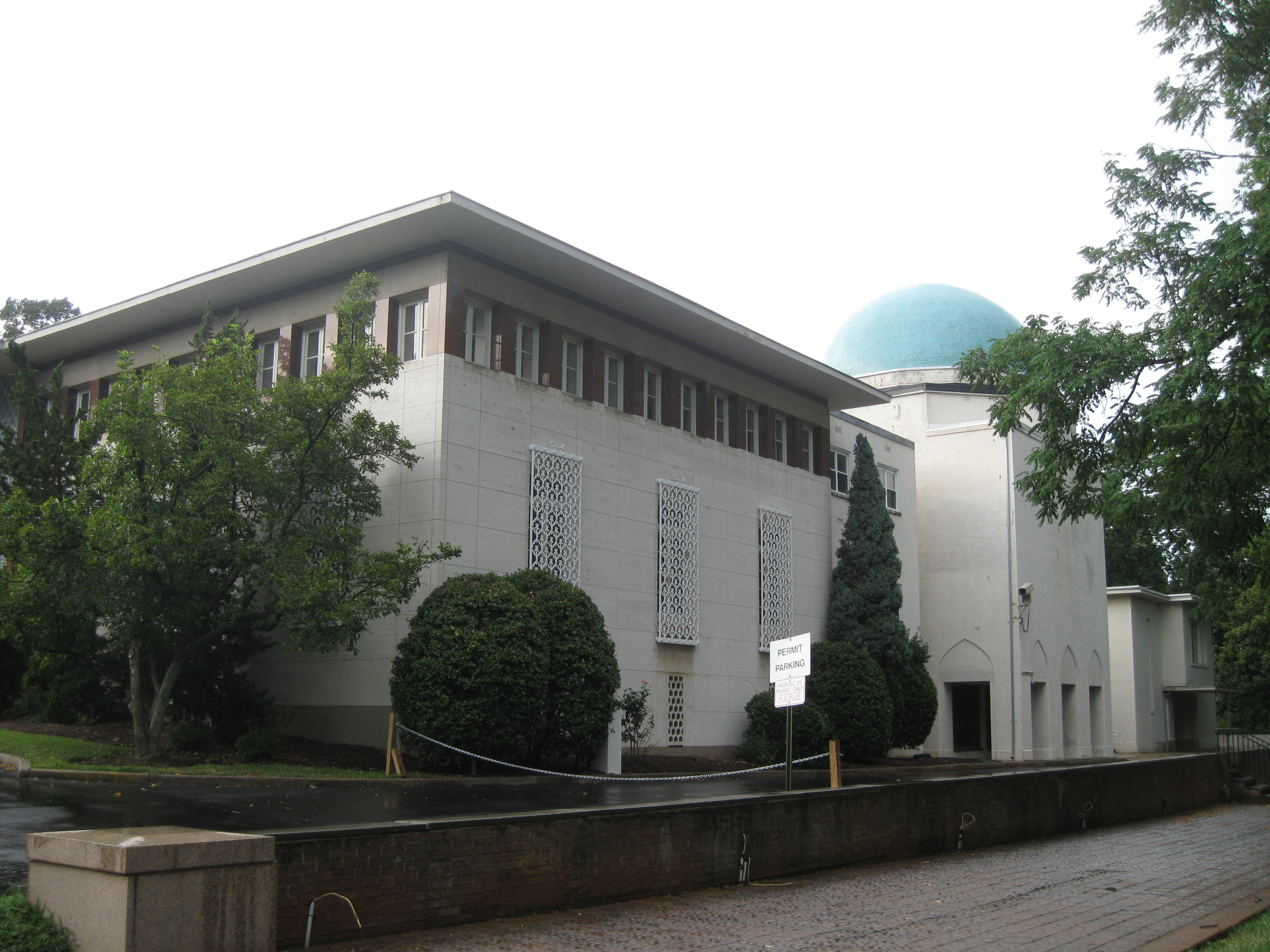
- Location: Washington, D.C.
- Address: 3003–3005 Massachusetts Avenue, N.W.
- Coordinates: 38°55′11″N 77°3′36″W
- Ambassador: Ardeshir Zahedi (last)

The Former Embassy of Iran in Washington, D.C. was the Imperial State of Iran's diplomatic mission to the United States. Direct bilateral Iran–United States relations between the two governments were severed following the Iranian revolution in 1979, and the subsequent seizure of hostages at the U.S. Embassy in Tehran, Iran.

== History ==
The chancery, a modernist building, was built in 1959. It is accompanied by a Georgian style structure that serves as the ambassador's residence. The complex is located in Washington, D.C.'s Embassy Row neighborhood.

During his reign Mohammad Reza Shah attended numerous embassy functions there. The last resident Ambassador, Ardeshir Zahedi, cultivated a reputation of opulence, with star-studded parties and dinners. Famous figures who visited the embassy include Elizabeth Taylor, Andy Warhol, Barbara Walters, and Frank Sinatra. This was documented in 2013 by Iranian-American artist Eric Parnes, the first person in over 34 years to photograph the interior of the embassy.

The embassy complex continues to be de jure owned by the Government of Iran, but it has not been used by the Iranian government since 7 April 1980, and its buildings and grounds are currently maintained and de facto controlled by the U.S. Department of State. Other properties include the residence of the Iranian military attache, 3410 Garfield Street NW, and the residence of the Iranian Minister of Cultural Affairs, 2954 Upton Street NW. Six of ten buildings are being rented.

== Iranian Interest Section of the Pakistani Embassy ==
Iran is now represented diplomatically through the Interests Section of the Islamic Republic of Iran in the United States located in the Pakistani Embassy.

== See also ==
- Embassy of the United States, Tehran
- Foreign relations of Iran
- Iran–United States relations
- List of ambassadors of Iran to the United States
