= MutualArt.com =

Art information website

- Founded: 2008; 18 years ago
- Area served: Worldwide
- Key people: Moti Shniberg
- Website: www.mutualart.com

MutualArt.com is an art information website that provides auction prices, personalized updates and data on a number of artists. MutualArt.com also includes an online art appraisals service. Premium Members have access to the site's Art Market Analysis.

== History ==
MutualArt.com was founded in 2008 by Moti Shniberg and Al Brenner. The company took the name MutualArt from a previous company founded by Moti Shniberg, Dan Galai, and David A. Ross (the Artist Pension Trust, which was initially called MutualArt). The companies have no relationship since 2016.

In 2008, MutualArt launched its online portal, mutualart.com. At the time, its web site was reportedly one of the first examples of the Web 2.0 Semantic Web applied to a customer service. The site attempted to link art collectors with artists, museums, galleries and information sources including the art publications, auction house information and prices.

In 2016, the company merged with the Artist Pension Trust to form the MutualArt Group.

The companies were then separated in 2019 and have no ties since.

== Services and Platform ==
MutualArt offers a range of services centered around art market intelligence, including:

- Auction Results Database: MutualArt maintains one of the art industry's most comprehensive databases, providing access to millions of historical auction records from leading international auction houses. The database covers more than 912,000 artists and allows users to analyze past sales, price trends, and market performance.
- Price Analytics and Artist Tracking: The platform offers tools that allow users to monitor market performance, estimate artwork value, and receive personalized alerts. Users can track when their followed artists appear in exhibitions, auctions, or press coverage. Each artist page includes detailed information on artwork condition, provenance, size, pricing, exhibition history, and year-over-year market performance analytics.
- Consignment Service: MutualArt's consignment service offers end-to-end artwork sales management, including professional valuation, sales strategy development, and placement with over 100 international auction houses. The service operates at no cost to clients, connecting collectors directly with leading auction venues worldwide.
- Gallery Partner Program: The Gallery Partner Program offers enhanced visibility, global audience reach, and market intelligence that helps galleries better position their artists and connect with qualified collectors without commissions on sales.

== Editorial and Content Initiatives ==
The platform also produces editorial content through the MutualArt Magazine, which covers collector stories, market reports, artist features, and interviews with industry professionals. Content is curated by an in-house editorial team and is distributed via the website and email newsletters.
