= MutualArt Group =

Pension plan for artists

Artist Pension Trust
- Industry: Financial services
- Number of locations: New York, Los Angeles, London, Leipzig, Mumbai, Hong Kong, Shanghai, Mexico City and Amman
- Area served: Worldwide
- Key people: Moti Shniberg; Dan Galai; David A. Ross (left); Pamela Auchincloss (left)
- Products: Investment products
- Total assets: Over US$100 million (2013 estimate of art collection)
- Parent: MutualArt
- Website: www.aptglobal.org

The Artist Pension Trust (APT), which merged into the MutualArt Group in 2016, is an investment vehicle specializing in contemporary art, which aims to provide financial security and international exposure to selected artists chosen by its international curatorial team. It has the largest global collection of contemporary art, comprising 10,000 artworks from 2,000 artists in 75 countries, and growing by more than 2,000 each year. As of November 2013, a total of 40,000 artworks had been committed to APT by 2,000 artists. APT claimed its then value to be more than $US100 million.

MutualArt.com, the art information website, has not ties to the Artist Pension Trust.

Artworks from the APT collection have been used to curate exhibitions for museums including the MoMA, Tate Modern, Hirshhorn Museum, as well as for art venues such as the Venice Biennale, Art Basel, documenta and Manifesta.

A 2021 article in The New York Times detailed multiple failures in the organization's goal of providing a diversified income for participating artists.

== History ==
In 2004, a company named MutualArt launched the Artist Pension Trust as the first pension program for visual contemporary artists. It was founded by businessman Moti Shniberg, Hebrew University business professor Dan Galai, and David A. Ross, former director of the Whitney Museum and the San Francisco Museum of Modern Art. APT started with eight regional trusts and subsequently launched a global trust, APT Global One, with a total of 628 artists.

After the first year, Artist Pension Trust owned the collection of approximately 65 artworks created by artists in the New York branch, including Jules de Balincourt, William Cordova, Anthony Goicolea, and Aida Ruilova.

== Storage fee changes ==
Artist Pension Trust announced that, beginning in September 2017, it would charge $6.50 per month for each work that members stored. The former CEO of the Mutual Art Group, which includes APT, defended the fee, arguing that the cost is much less than artists will have to pay elsewhere. He told Colin Gleadell of Artnet that “it’s not about raising money to balance our books; [it’s about getting] the work out of storage so that it can be seen and eventually sold. Some works have been in storage for ten years and that’s not good.” According to Brenner, the appeal of APT for some artists was the free storage facilities. In order to become a member, one originally had to agree to contribute to the storage expenses for oversize works when signing the contract, but the policy has never been enforced. In October 2017 seven former APT directors of the New York, London, Berlin, and Dubai Trusts and 21 APT officials— put their names on an open letter expressing solidarity with the aggrieved artists. The letter expresses “deep disappointment in the direction APT is moving,” saying that the policy changes deviate from the original vision of the Trust as they understood it.

== Artwork distribution ==
The artworks in the trust are gradually sold over the course of 20 years for the benefit of the artists. The funds from the net proceeds of each artwork sold are distributed in the following manner: 72% are distributed to the artists in the trust, with 40% to the individual artist and 32% among the artists in that trust based on the number of artworks they have deposited. The remaining 28% is used to cover the operational costs of the trusts.

== APT Institute ==
In July 2013, Artist Pension Trust announced establishment of APT Institute, a nonprofit organization whose task is to facilitate exhibitions and loans for curators, museums, and art organizations, as well as to promote contemporary art and artists worldwide. Recent loans arranged through the APT Institute include Jean Shin’s installation of neckties and a chain link fence named "Untied", which featured in the solo show "Jean Shin: Common Threads", at the Smithsonian American Art Museum, and Sherif El Azma’s "Powerchord Skateboard", a two-screen DVD installation that was part of the Tate Modern’s recent show "Project Space: Objects in Mirror Are Closer Than They Appear".
