= Iran–United States relations =

- Iran: United States

Diplomatic mission
- Interests Section of Iran in the Embassy of Pakistan, Washington, D.C.: Interests Section of the United States in the Embassy of Switzerland, Tehran

Envoy
- Director of the Interests Section Mehdi Atefat: Deputy Special Envoy Abram Paley

Relations between Iran and the United States began in the mid-19th century, when Iran was known to the Western world as Qajar Persia. While Persia was the object of British and Russian colonial interests during the Great Game, the US gained the trust of its leaders, with Arthur Millspaugh and Morgan Shuster appointed treasurers-general by the Shahs. During World War II, Iran was invaded by the United Kingdom and the Soviet Union, both U.S. allies. Relations remained positive until the Mohammad Mosaddegh government was overthrown by the 1953 Iranian coup d'état, organized by the Central Intelligence Agency, and assisted by MI6. This was followed by an alliance between Shah Mohammad Reza Pahlavi's regime and the US government. From being close allies during the Cold War, Iran-US relations flipped after the 1979 Iranian Revolution, when Ayatollah Ruhollah Khomeini took power.

The two nations have had no formal diplomatic relations since 1980: Pakistan and Switzerland serving as protecting powers for Iran and the US respectively. Communication goes through the Pakistani Embassy in Washington and the Swiss Embassy in Tehran. Since 1995, the United States has had an embargo on trade with Iran. Relations improved when the two countries had overlapping goals, such as joining forces in the war against the Islamic State. In 2015, the Joint Comprehensive Plan of Action to limit Iran's nuclear program was signed; most sanctions against Iran were lifted the next year. The first Trump administration withdrew from the deal and re-imposed sanctions in 2018; in August, former Supreme leader Ali Khamenei banned direct talks with the United States. In the years that followed Iran reduced its deal commitments and exceeded pre-JCPOA enrichment levels. The Biden administration increased sanctions; so did the second Trump administration.

On February 28, 2026, Israel and the United States launched a joint attack on various sites in Iran, beginning a war between the three countries. The operation included the assassination of Ali Khamenei, Iran's supreme leader. After three months of war, the US and Iran announced on June 14, 2026, that they had agreed to halt hostilities. Mediated by Pakistan and Qatar, the memorandum of understanding presented a 60-day extension of the existing ceasefire to lay the groundwork for a final settlement.

== History ==
=== Early relations ===
American newspapers in the 1720s were uniformly pro-Iranian, especially during the revolt of Afghan emir Mahmud Hotak (r. 1722–1725) against the Safavid dynasty.

Political relations between Qajar Persia and the United States began when the Shah of Iran, Nassereddin Shah Qajar, officially dispatched Iran's first ambassador, Mirza Abolhasan, to Washington, D.C. in 1856. In 1883, Samuel G. W. Benjamin was appointed by the United States as the first official diplomatic envoy to Iran; however, ambassadorial relations were not established until 1944.

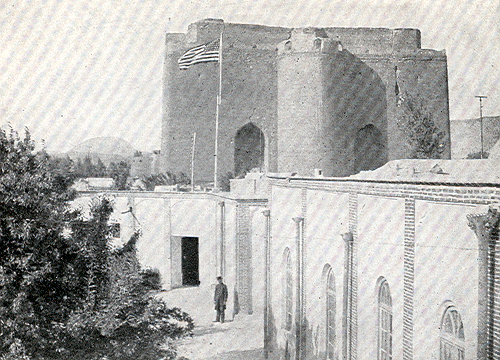
The U.S. Consulate at Arg e Tabriz sits in the line of fire during the Iranian Constitutional Revolution. While the city was being attacked and bombed by 4,000 Russian troops in December 1911, Howard Baskerville took to arms, helping the people of Iran.

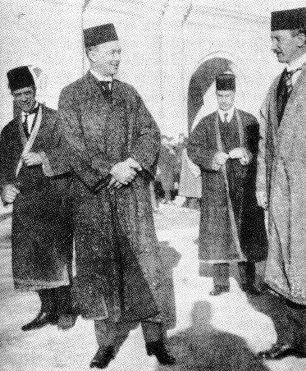
Americans wearing jobbeh va kolah (traditional Persian clothes) at the opening of the Majles, January 29, 1924. Mr. McCaskey, Dr. Arthur Millspaugh, and Colonel MacCormack are seen in the photo.

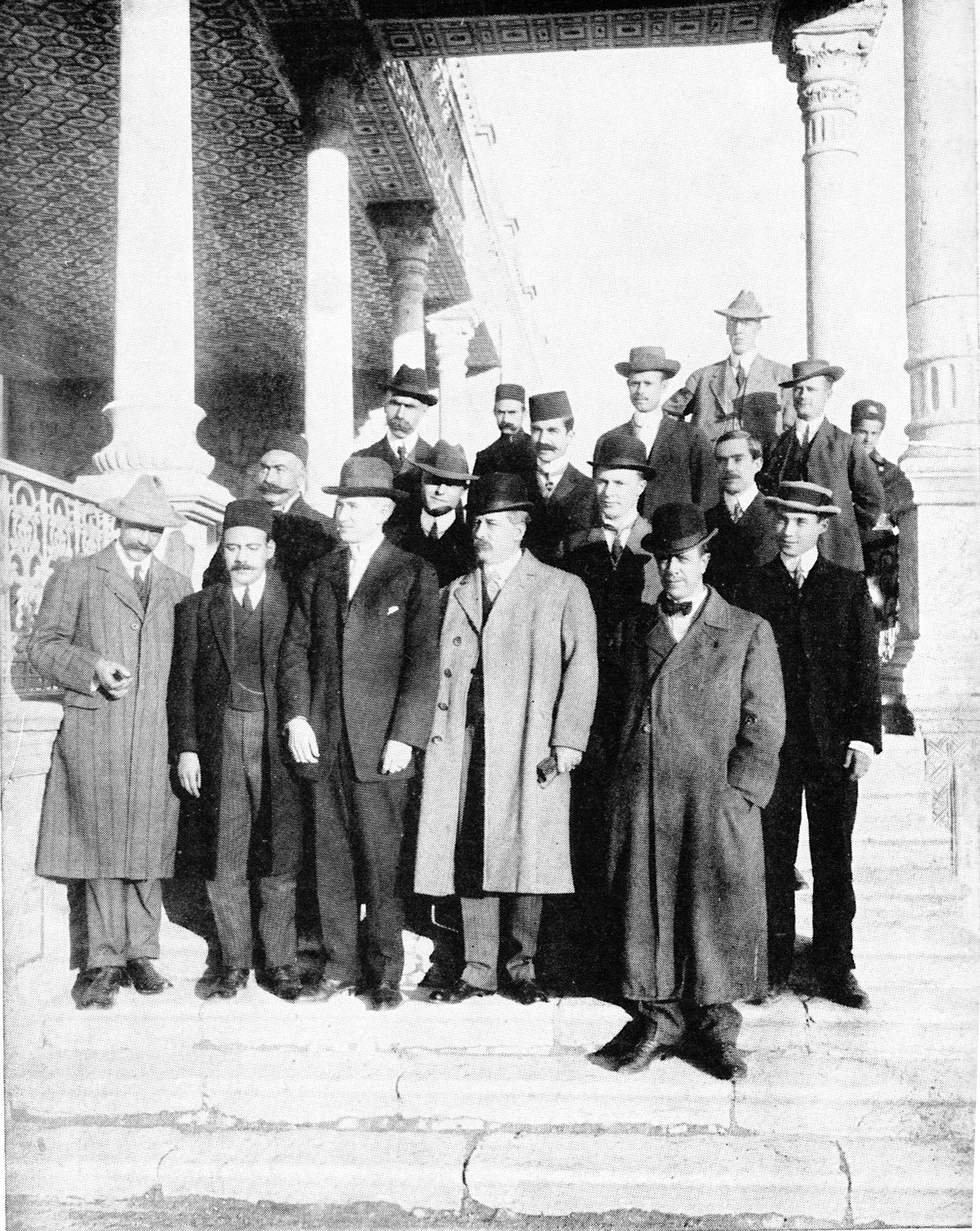
Morgan Shuster and U.S. officials at Atabak Palace, Tehran, 1911. Their group was appointed by Iran's parliament to reform and modernize Iran's Department of Treasury and Finances.

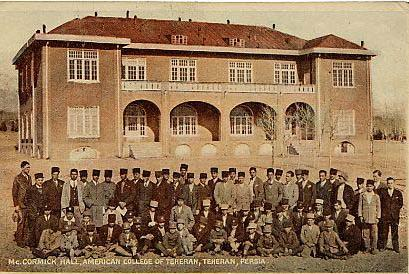
McCormick Hall, American College of Tehran, circa 1930, chartered by the State University of New York in 1932. Americans also founded Iran's first modern College of Medicine in the 1870s.

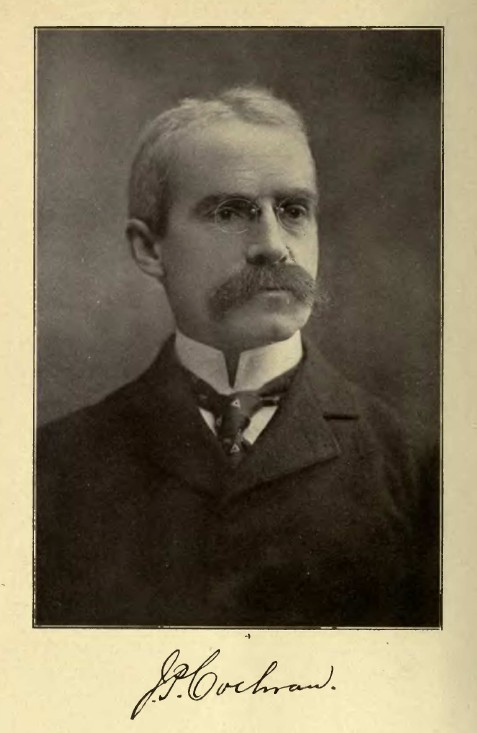
Joseph Plumb Cochran, American Presbyterian missionary. He is credited as the founder of Iran's first modern medical school.

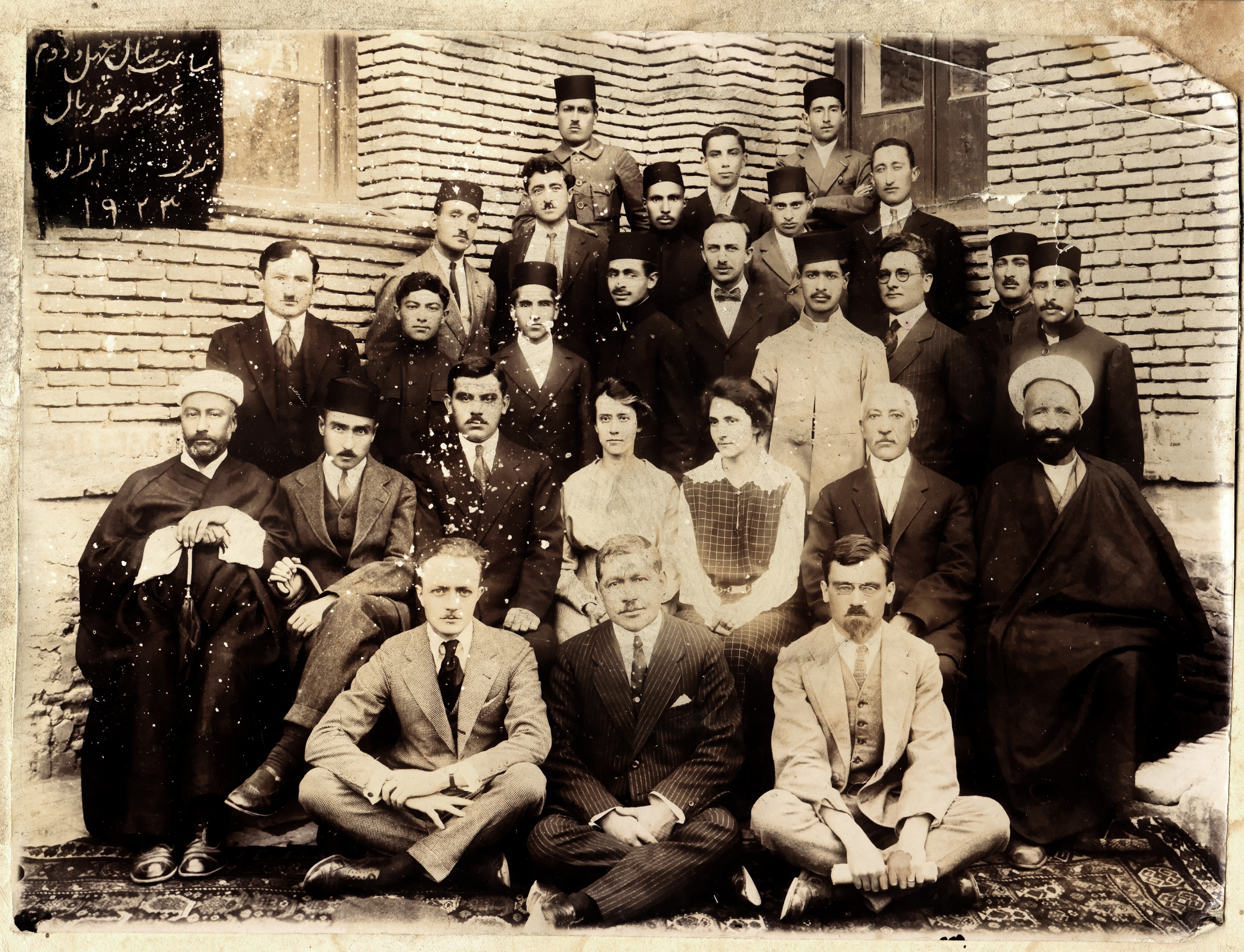
American Memorial School in Tabriz, established in 1881

The U.S. had little interest in Persian affairs, while the U.S. as a trustworthy outsider did not suffer. The Persians again sought the U.S. for help in straightening out their finances after World War I. This mission was opposed by powerful vested interests and eventually was withdrawn with its task incomplete.

During the Persian Constitutional Revolution in 1909, American Howard Baskerville died in Tabriz while fighting with a militia in a battle against royalist forces. After the Iranian parliament appointed United States financier Morgan Shuster as Treasurer General of Iran in 1911, an American was killed in Tehran by gunmen thought to be affiliated with Russian or British interests. Shuster became even more active in supporting the Constitutional Revolution of Iran financially.

Arthur Millspaugh, an American economic adviser, was sent to Persia in 1923 as a private citizen to help reform its inefficient administration. His presence was seen by Persians as a means to attract foreign investment and counterbalance European influence. The mission ended in 1928 after Millspaugh fell out of favor with the shah.

Until World War II, relations between Iran and the United States remained cordial. As a result, many Iranians sympathetic to the Persian Constitutional Revolution came to view the U.S. as a "third force" in their struggle to expel British and Russian dominance in Persian affairs. American industrial and business leaders were supportive of Iran's drive to modernize its economy and to expel British and Russian influence from the country.

Reza Khan, a military officer in Persia's Cossack Brigade, came to power after leading a British-backed coup in 1921 that overthrew the Qajar dynasty. He later declared himself shah (king) and took the name Reza Pahlavi. He launched modernization efforts, building a national railway and introducing secular education, while also censoring the press, suppressing unions and parties, and later banning the hijab in favor of Western dress. In 1936, Iran withdrew its ambassador in Washington for nearly one year after the publication of an article criticizing Reza Shah in The New York Daily Herald.

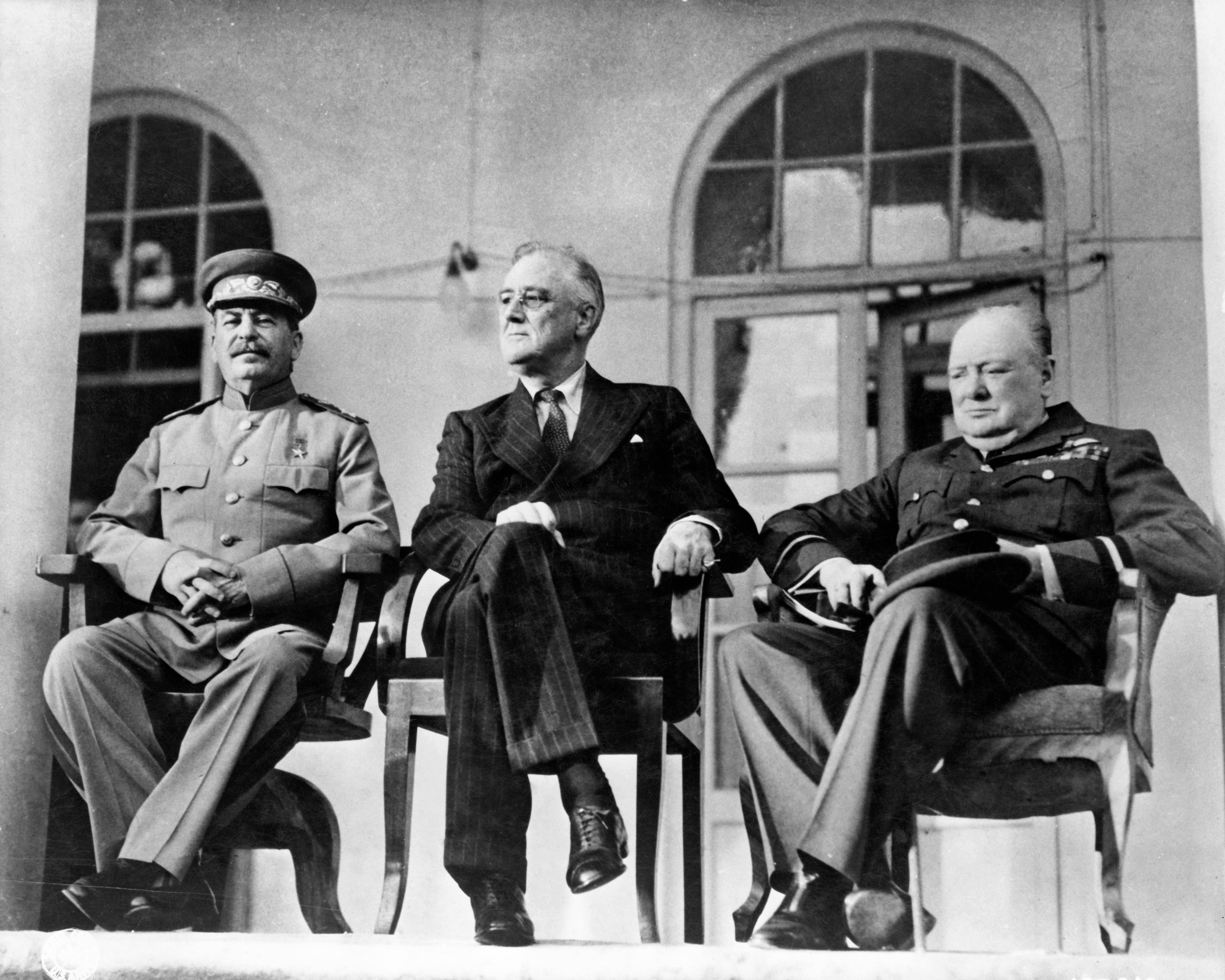
The Allied "Big Three" at the 1943 Tehran Conference

After a dispute over German influence during World War II, Reza Shah was forced to abdicate in 1941 and was succeeded by his son, Mohammad Reza Pahlavi. During the rest of World War II, Iran became a major conduit for British and American aid to the Soviet Union and an avenue through which over 120,000 Polish refugees and Polish Armed Forces fled the Axis advance. At the 1943 Tehran Conference, the Allied "Big Three"—Joseph Stalin, Franklin D. Roosevelt, and Winston Churchill—issued the Tehran Declaration to guarantee the post-war independence and boundaries of Iran. In 1949, the Constituent Assembly of Iran gave the shah the power to dissolve the parliament.

=== 1953 Iranian coup d'état ===
==== Before the coup ====
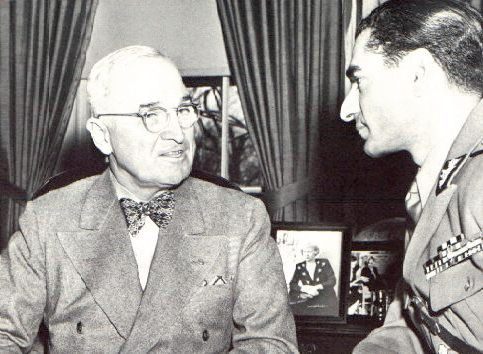
The Shah with Harry S. Truman in 1949

Until the outbreak of World War II, the United States had no active policy toward Iran. When the Cold War began, the United States was alarmed by the attempt by the Soviet Union to set up separatist states in Iranian Azerbaijan and Kurdistan, as well as its demand for military rights to the Dardanelles in 1946. This fear was enhanced by the loss of China to communism, the uncovering of Soviet spy rings, and the start of the Korean War.

==== Prime minister Mossadeq ====
In 1951, Iran nationalised its oil industry, effectively seizing the assets of the Anglo-Iranian Oil Company (AIOC). On April 28, 1951, Mohammad Mosaddegh was elected as Prime Minister by the Parliament of Iran.

The British planned to retaliate by attacking Iran, but U.S. President Harry S. Truman pressed Britain to moderate its position in the negotiations and to not invade Iran. American policies fostered a sense in Iran that the United States supported Mossadeq, along with optimism that the oil dispute would soon be resolved through "a series of innovative proposals" that would provide Iran with "significant amounts of economic aid." Mossadeq visited Washington, and the American government made "frequent statements expressing support for him."

At the same time, the United States honored the British embargo and, without Truman's knowledge, the Central Intelligence Agency station in Tehran had been "carrying out covert activities" against Mosaddeq and the National Front "at least since the summer of 1952".

==== The coup d'état ====
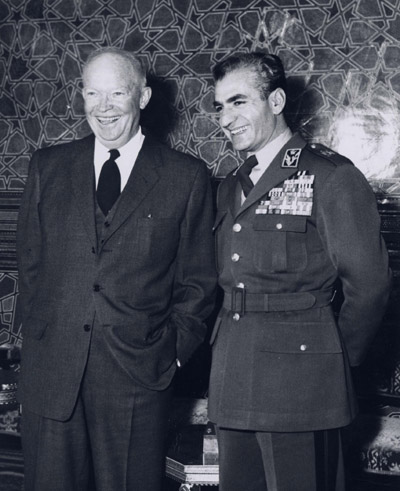
The Shah with Dwight D. Eisenhower in 1959

In 1953, the U.S. and Britain orchestrated a coup to overthrow Iran's prime minister Mohammad Mosaddeq, fearing communist influence and economic instability after Iran nationalized its oil industry. The coup, led by the CIA and MI6, initially failed but succeeded on a second attempt. It reinstalled Shah Mohammad Reza Pahlavi, who then received substantial U.S. financial and military support. The U.S. helped establish SAVAK, the Shah's brutal secret police, to maintain his rule. Many liberal Iranians believe that the coup and the subsequent U.S. support for the shah enabled the Shah's arbitrary rule, contributing to the "deeply anti-American character" of the 1979 revolution later.

After the coup, the United States played a central role in reorganizing Iran's oil sector. Under U.S. pressure, BP joined a consortium of Western companies to resume Iranian oil exports. The consortium operated on behalf of the state-owned National Iranian Oil Company (NIOC), which retained formal ownership of Iran's oil and infrastructure. While Iran received 50% of the profits, U.S. companies collectively secured 40% of the remaining share. However, the consortium maintained operational control, barred Iranian oversight of its financial records, and excluded Iranians from its board. The agreement was part of a wider transition from British to American dominance in the region and worldwide.

While initially seen as a Cold War success, the coup later became a source of deep resentment, with critics calling it a blow to democracy and a lasting stain on U.S.-Iran relations.

=== U.S.–Shah alliance ===
Pahlavi Iran–United States relations

- Iran: United States

Diplomatic mission
- Embassy of Iran, Washington, D.C.: Embassy of the United States, Tehran

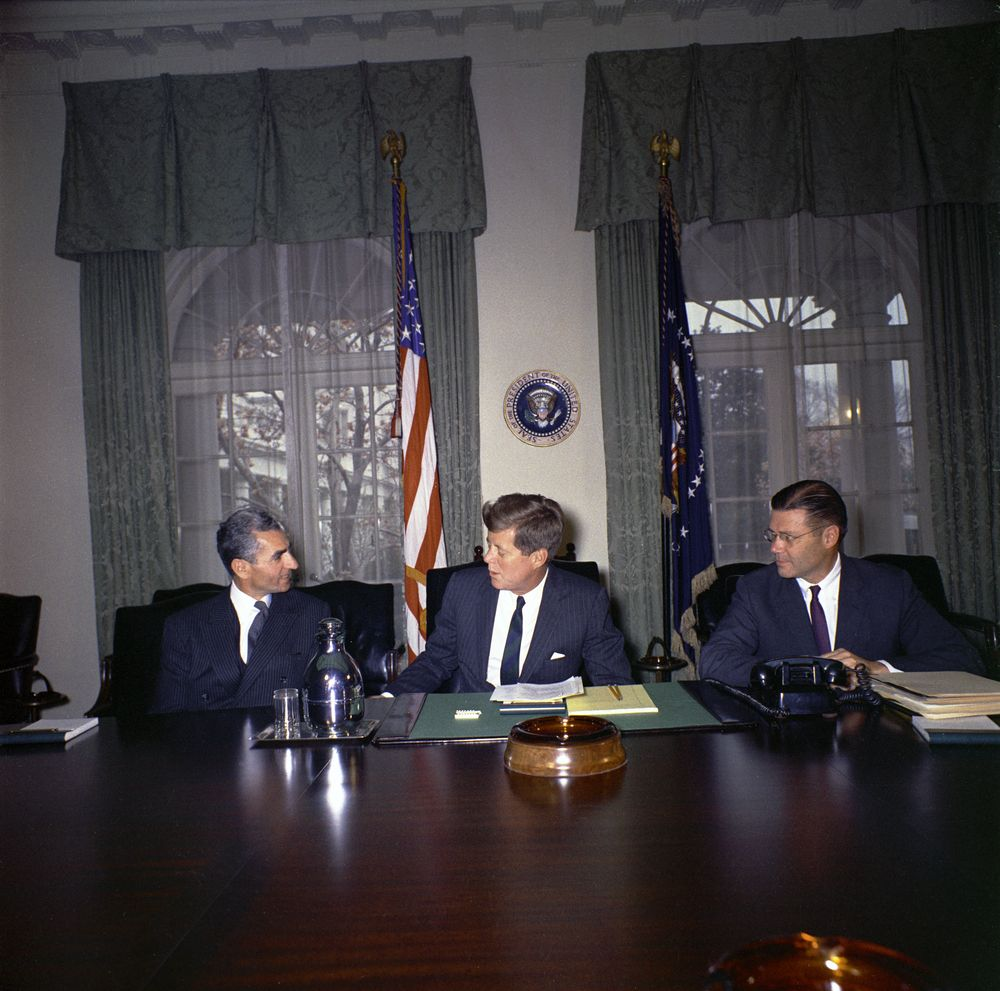
The Shah with John F. Kennedy and Robert McNamara in 1961

==== Nuclear cooperation ====
In 1953, U.S. President Eisenhower launched Iran's nuclear program as part of the Atoms for Peace program. In 1967, the U.S. helped Iran create its nuclear program by providing the Tehran Research Reactor, the nation's first nuclear reactor, as well as 5.58 kg of enriched uranium. Iran is one of the 51 original signatories of the Treaty on the Non-Proliferation of Nuclear Weapons (NPT) on July 1, 1968, and its Parliament ratified the treaty in February 1970. The participation of the U.S. and Western European governments continued until the 1979 Iranian Revolution.

==== Strategic alliance and geopolitical importance ====
President Lyndon Johnson welcoming the Shah at the White House while Iranians protest, 1967

Iran's border with the Soviet Union, and its position as the largest, most powerful country in the oil-rich Persian Gulf, made Iran a "pillar" of U.S. foreign policy in the Middle East. In 1960, Iran joined Iraq, Kuwait, Saudi Arabia, and Venezuela to form the Organization of Petroleum Exporting Countries (OPEC), aiming to challenge the dominance of Western oil companies and reclaim control over national oil resources. In the 1960s and 1970s, Iran's oil revenues grew considerably. Beginning in the mid-1960s, this development "weakened U.S. influence in Iranian politics" while strengthening the Iranian state's power over its own population. By the 1970s, surging OPEC profits gave the group substantial leverage over Western economies and elevated Iran's strategic value as a U.S. ally. According to scholar Homa Katouzian, this put the United States "in the contradictory position of being regarded" by the Iranian public "as the chief architect and instructor of the regime," while "its real influence" in domestic Iranian politics and policies "declined considerably".

==== Military cooperation and arms sales ====
Lee Driscoll and other historians have said that between 1969 and 1974 U.S. President Richard Nixon actively recruited the Shah as an American puppet and proxy. However, Richard Alvandi argues that it worked the other way around, with the Shah taking the initiative. President Nixon, who had first met the Shah in 1953, regarded him as a westernizing anticommunist statesman who deserved American support now that the British were withdrawing from the region. They met again in 1972 and the Shah agreed to buy large quantities of American military hardware, and took responsibility for ensuring political stability and fighting off Soviet subversion throughout the region. Permitting Iran to purchase U.S. arms served Cold War objectives by securing the Shah's alignment with Washington after Iran had briefly explored Soviet alternatives in the 1960s, while also benefiting the American economy. However, because of the 1973 Arab–Israeli War and the subsequent Arab oil embargo against the United States, oil prices became very high. This enabled the shah to buy more advanced weaponry than U.S. officials had expected, which caused concern in Washington.

In the 1970s, approximately 25,000 American technicians were deployed to Iran to maintain military equipment (such as F-14s) that had been sold to the Shah's government.

==== Cultural and academic relations ====
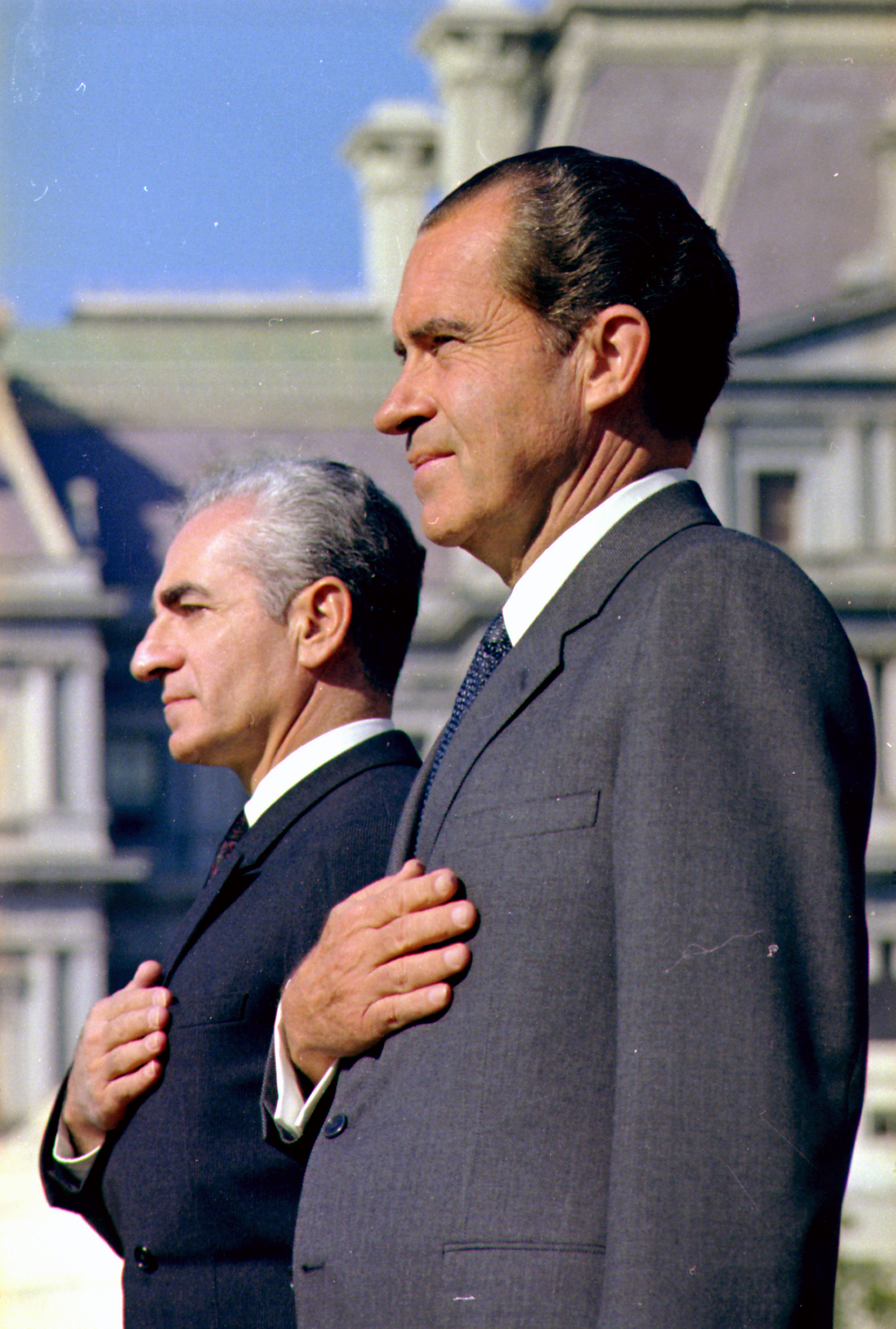
The Shah with Richard Nixon in 1969

Cultural relations between the two countries remained cordial until 1979. Pahlavi University, Sharif University of Technology, and Isfahan University of Technology, three of Iran's top academic universities, were directly modeled on private American institutions such as the University of Chicago, MIT, and the University of Pennsylvania. The Shah was generous in awarding American universities with financial gifts. For example, the University of Southern California received an endowed chair of petroleum engineering, and a million-dollar donation was given to the George Washington University to create an Iranian Studies program.

Prior to the Iranian Revolution of 1979, many Iranian citizens, especially students, resided in the United States and had a positive and welcoming attitude toward America and Americans. From 1950 to 1979, an estimated 800,000 to 850,000 Americans had visited or lived in Iran, and had often expressed their admiration for the Iranian people.

=== Ford administration 1974–1977 ===
Under president Gerald Ford, U.S.–Iran relations began to cool. Unlike Richard Nixon, Ford lacked a close personal relationship with the Shah, and his administration took a more cautious stance on nuclear cooperation. Negotiations over American nuclear exports to Iran faltered as Ford insisted on additional safeguards beyond those required by the Nuclear Non-Proliferation Treaty, which the Shah rejected as an infringement on Iran's sovereignty.

In 1975, President Ford approved a plan allowing Iran to process U.S. nuclear materials and purchase a plutonium reprocessing facility. Henry Kissinger later described it as a commercial deal with an ally, with no discussion of weapons concerns.

Despite continuing Nixon's arms sales policy, granting Iran wide access to U.S. weapons, Ford faced internal opposition and growing concerns in Congress. Meanwhile, U.S. officials—particularly Treasury Secretary William Simon grew increasingly critical of the Shah's role in maintaining high oil prices, during a time when surging inflation was driving the U.S. economy toward a recession. To America, the Shah's strategy of pumping oil profits into domestic investments, such as its military, indicated Iran's desire for superpower status. In 1976, the U.S. covertly supported Saudi Arabia's move to drive down oil prices, undercutting Iran's revenues.

The resulting oil price collapse in early 1977 triggered a severe financial crisis in Iran, forcing austerity measures that led to rising unemployment and social unrest. These developments significantly weakened the Shah's regime and contributed to the conditions that precipitated the 1979 Islamic Revolution. Later declassified documents suggest that key U.S. policymakers underestimated the risks of destabilizing their long-time ally.

=== Carter administration 1977–1981 ===
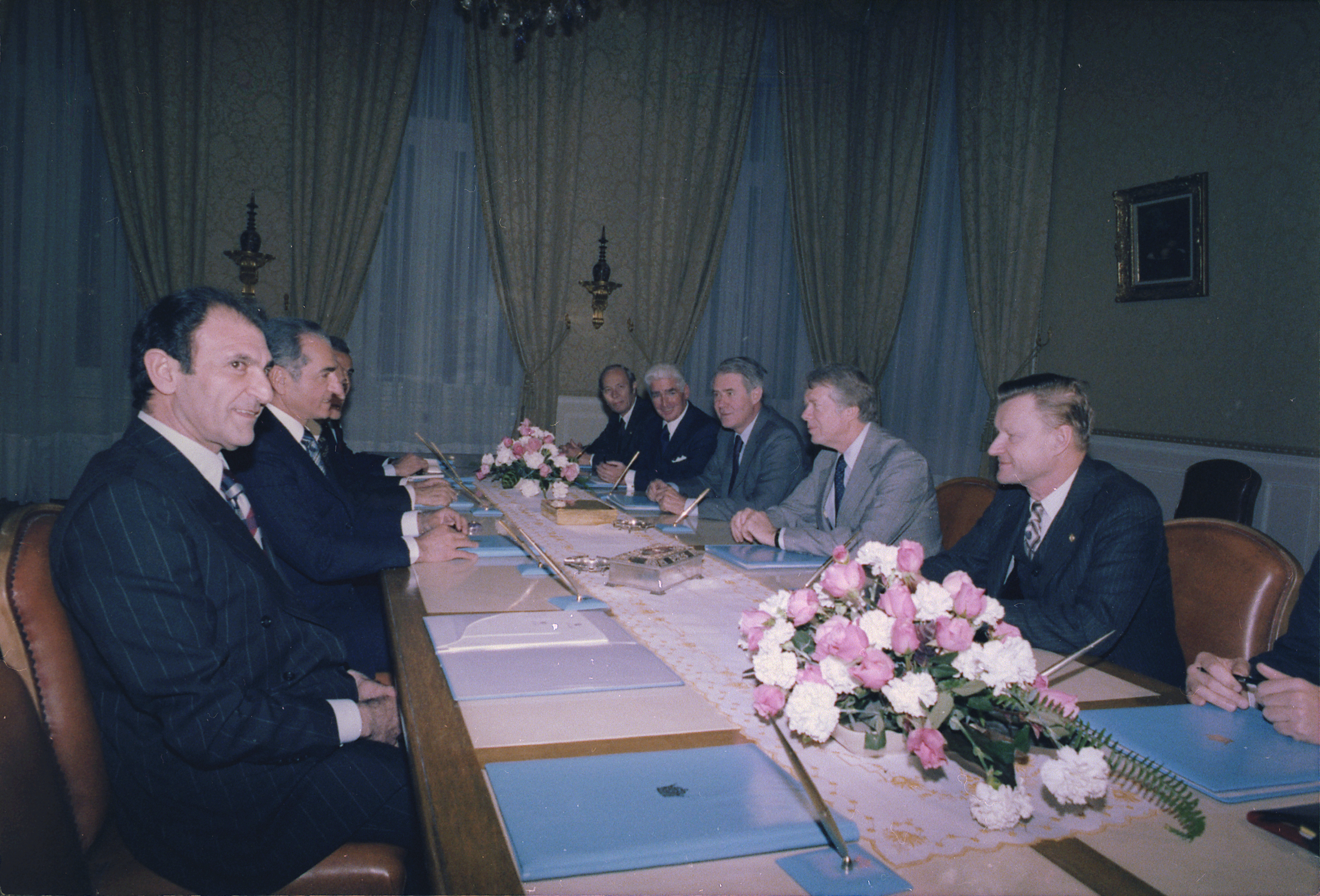
The Iranian Shah, Mohammad Reza Pahlavi meeting with Alfred Atherton, William H. Sullivan, Cyrus Vance, President Jimmy Carter, and Zbigniew Brzezinski, 1977

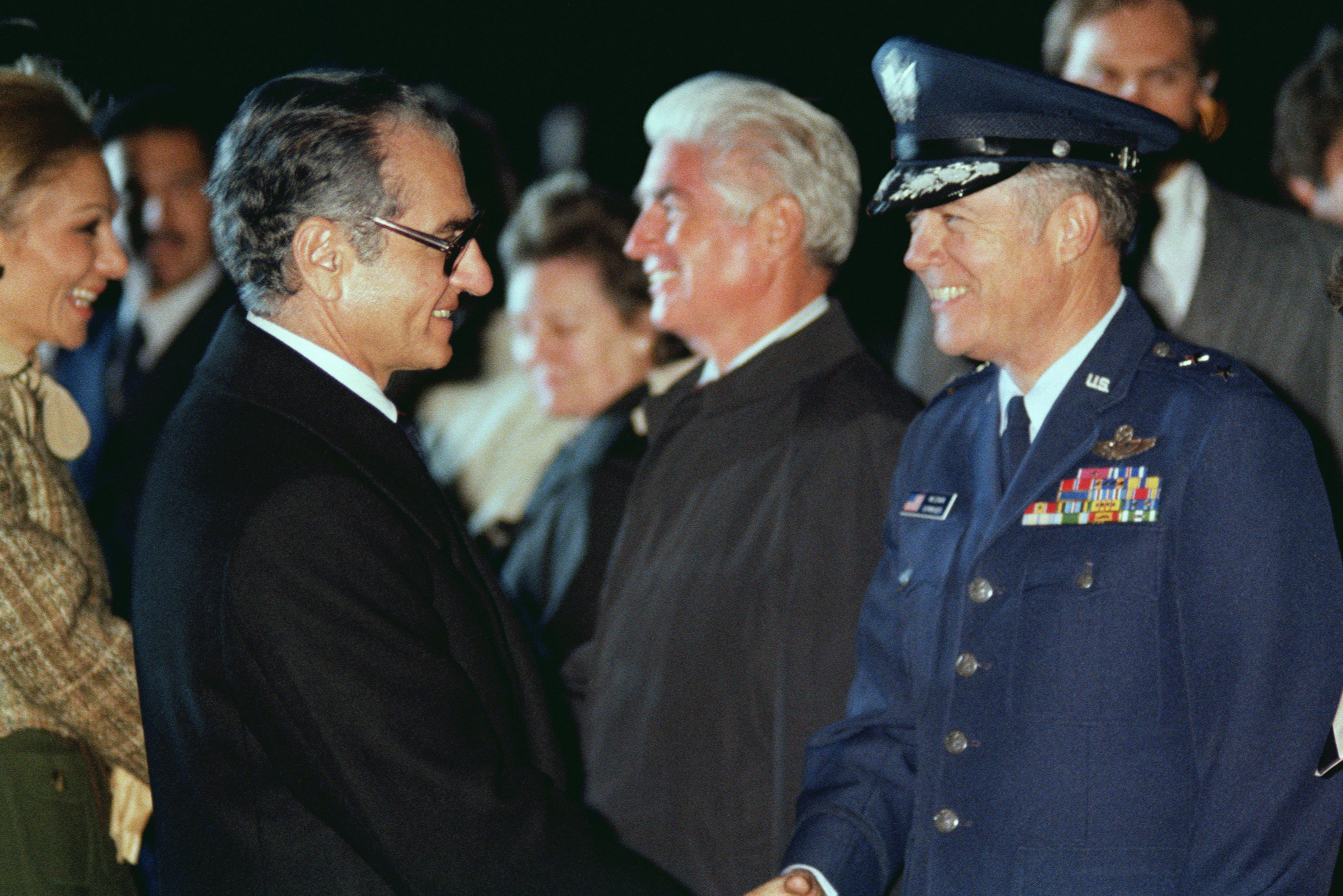
Mohammed Reza Pahlavi, Shah of Iran, shakes hands with a U.S. Air Force general officer prior to his departure from the United States

In the late 1970s, American President Jimmy Carter emphasized human rights in his foreign policy, but went easy in private with the Shah. By 1977, Iran had garnered unfavorable publicity in the international community for its bad human rights record. That year, the Shah responded to Carter's "polite reminder" by granting amnesty to some prisoners and allowing the Red Cross to visit prisons. Through 1977, liberal opposition formed organizations and issued open letters denouncing the Shah's regime.

Carter angered anti-Shah Iranians with a New Year's Eve 1978 toast to the Shah in which he said:

Under the Shah's brilliant leadership Iran is an island of stability in one of the most troublesome regions of the world. There is no other state figure whom I could appreciate and like more.

Observers disagree over the nature of United States policy toward Iran under Carter as the Shah's regime crumbled. According to historian Nikki Keddie, the Carter administration followed "no clear policy" on Iran. The U.S. National Security Advisor Zbigniew Brzezinski "repeatedly assured Pahlavi that the U.S. backed him fully". At the same time, officials in the State Department believed the revolution was unstoppable. After visiting the Shah in 1978, Secretary of the Treasury W. Michael Blumenthal complained of the Shah's emotional collapse. Brzezinski and Energy Secretary James Schlesinger were adamant in assurances that the Shah would receive military support.

Sociologist Charles Kurzman argues that the Carter administration was consistently supportive of the Shah and urged the Iranian military to stage a "last-resort coup d'état".

==== Iranian Revolution ====
The Iranian/Islamic Revolution (1978–1979) ousted the Shah and replaced him with the anti-American Supreme Leader Ayatollah Ruhollah Khomeini. The United States government State Department and intelligence services "consistently underestimated the magnitude and long-term implications of this unrest". Six months before the revolution culminated, the CIA had produced a report stating that "Iran is not in a revolutionary or even a 'prerevolutionary' situation."

Revolutionary students feared the power of the United States, particularly the CIA, to overthrow a new Iranian government. One source of this concern was a book by CIA agent Kermit Roosevelt Jr. titled Countercoup: The Struggle for Control of Iran. Many students had read excerpts from the book and thought that the CIA would attempt to implement this countercoup strategy.

Khomeini referred to America as the "Great Satan" and instantly got rid of the Shah's prime minister, replacing him with politician Mehdi Bazargan. Until this point, the Carter administration was still hoping for normal relationships with Iran, sending its National Security Adviser Zbigniew Brzezinski.

The Islamic revolutionaries wished to extradite and execute the ousted Shah, and Carter refused to give him any further support or help return him to power. The Shah, suffering from terminal cancer, requested entry into the United States for treatment. The American embassy in Tehran opposed the request, as they were intent on stabilizing relations between the new interim revolutionary government of Iran and the United States. However, President Carter agreed to let the Shah in after pressure from Henry Kissinger, David Rockefeller, and other pro-Shah political figures. Iranians' suspicion that the Shah was actually trying to conspire against the Iranian Revolution grew; thus, this incident was often used by the Iranian revolutionaries to justify their claims that the former monarch was an American puppet, and this led to the storming of the American embassy by radical students allied with Khomeini.

==== The hostage crisis and its consequences ====
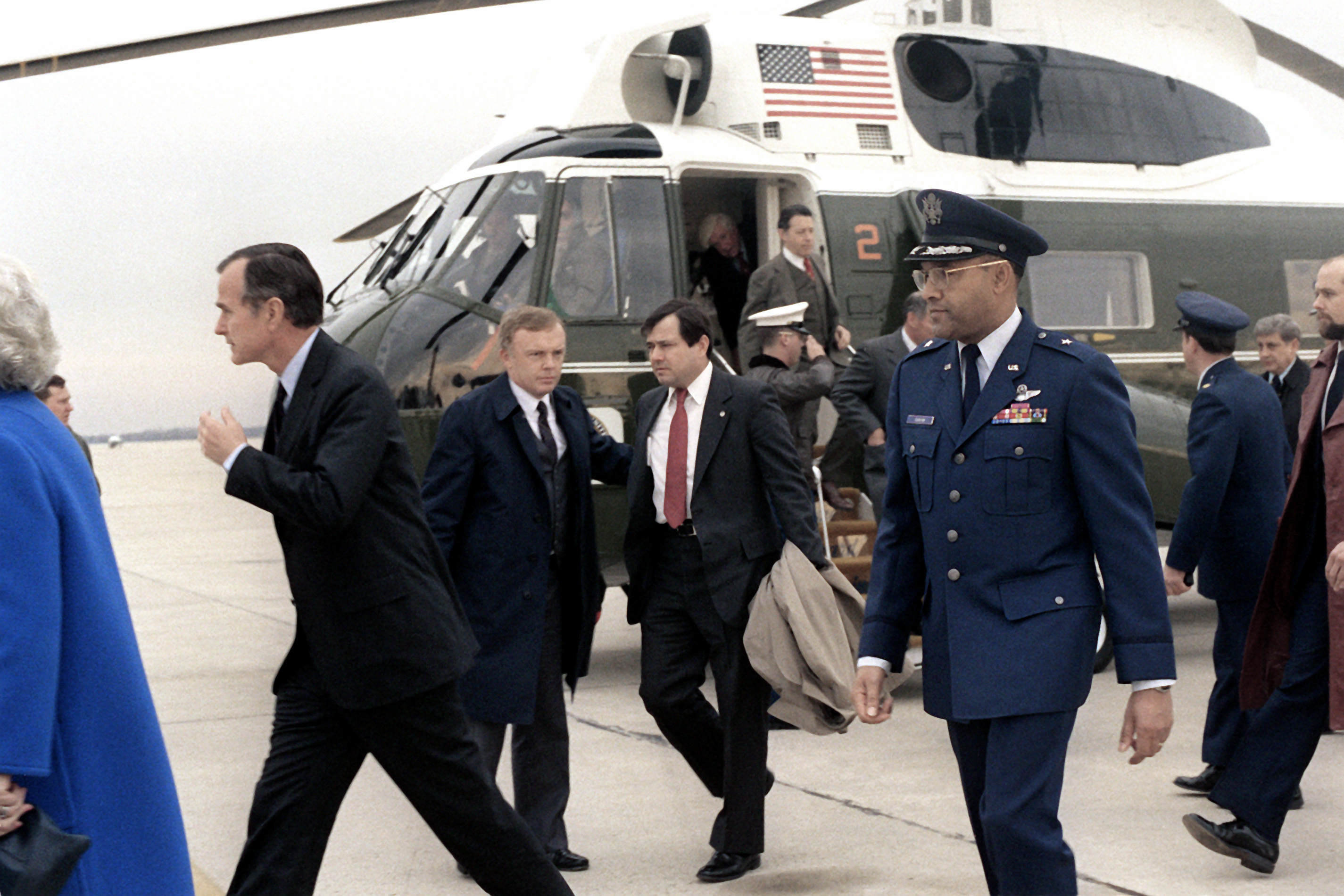
Vice President George H. W. Bush and other VIPs wait to welcome the former hostages to Iran home

On November 4, 1979, Iranian student revolutionaries, with Ayatollah Khomeini's approval, seized the U.S. embassy in Tehran, holding 52 American diplomats hostage for 444 days in response to the U.S. granting asylum to the deposed Shah. The crisis, seen in Iran as a stand against American influence and in the U.S. as a violation of diplomatic law, led to failed rescue attempts and lasting damage to Iran–U.S. relations. Six Americans escaped via the CIA–Canadian "Canadian Caper" operation, later dramatized in the film Argo.
As a response to the seizure of the embassy, Carter banned Iranian oil imports, followed by his Executive Order 12170 froze about $12 billion in Iranian assets, including bank deposits, gold and other properties. They were the first of a number of international sanctions against Iran.

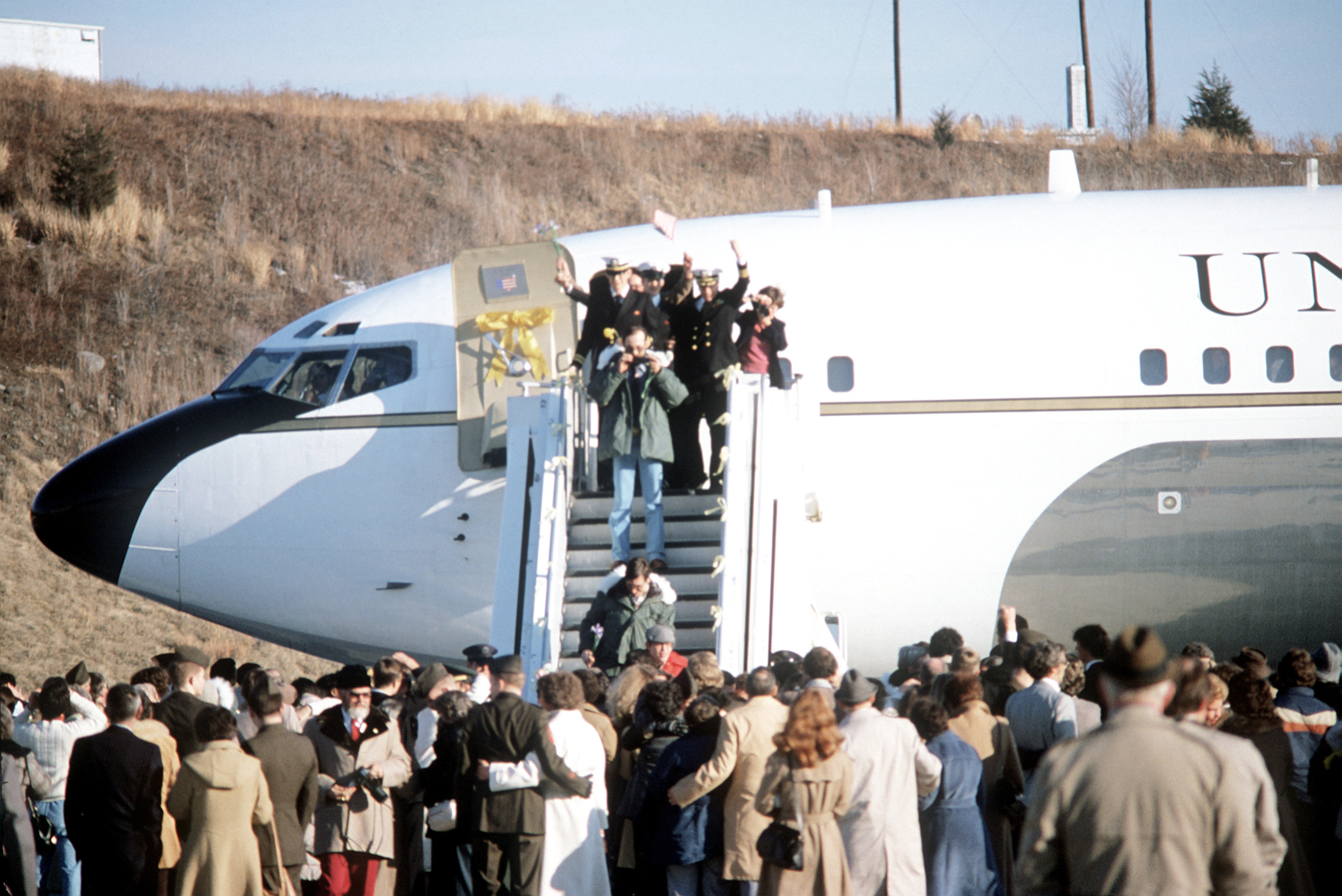
Families wait for the former hostages to disembark the plane

The crisis ended with the Algiers Accords in January 1981. Under the terms of the agreement and Iran's compliance, the hostaged diplomats were allowed to leave Iran. One of the chief provisions of the Accords was that the United States would lift the freeze on Iranian assets and remove trade sanctions. The agreement also established the Iran–U.S. Claims Tribunal in The Hague to handle claims brought by Americans against Iran, as well as claims by Iran against Americans and the former shah. The diplomatic ties remain severed, with Switzerland and Pakistan handling each country's interests.

=== Reagan administration 1981–1989 ===
==== Iran–Iraq War ====
American intelligence and logistical support played a crucial role in arming Iraq in the Iran–Iraq War. However, Bob Woodward states that the United States gave information to both sides, hoping "to engineer a stalemate". In search for a new set or order in this region, Washington adopted a policy designed to contain both sides economically and militarily. During the second half of the Iran–Iraq War, the Reagan administration pursued several sanction bills against Iran; on the other hand, it established full diplomatic relations with Saddam Hussein's Ba'athist government in Iraq by removing it from the U.S. list of State Sponsors of Terrorism in 1984. According to the U.S. Senate Banking Committee, the administrations of Presidents Reagan and George H. W. Bush authorized the sale to Iraq of numerous dual-use items, including chemicals and biological agents, such as anthrax and bubonic plague. The Iran–Iraq War ended with both agreeing to a ceasefire in 1988.

==== 1983: Hezbollah bombings ====
Hezbollah, an Iran-backed Shi'ite Islamist group, has carried out multiple anti-American attacks, including the 1983 U.S. Embassy bombing in Beirut (killing 63, including 17 Americans), the Beirut barracks bombing (killing 241 U.S. Marines), and the 1996 Khobar Towers bombing. U.S. courts have ruled Iran responsible for these attacks, with evidence showing Hezbollah operated under Iran's direction and that Supreme Leader Ali Khamenei authorized the Khobar Towers bombing.

==== 1983: Anti-communist purge ====
According to the Tower Commission report:

In 1983, the U.S. helped bring to the attention of Tehran the threat inherent in the extensive infiltration of the government by the communist Tudeh Party and Soviet or pro-Soviet cadres in the country. Using this information, the Khomeini government took measures, including mass executions, that virtually eliminated the pro-Soviet infrastructure in Iran.

==== Iran–Contra Affair ====
To evade congressional rules regarding an arms embargo, officials in President Ronald Reagan's administration arranged in the mid-1980s to sell arms to Iran in an attempt to improve relations and obtain their influence in the release of hostages held in Lebanon. Oliver North of the National Security Council diverted proceeds from the arms sale to fund anti-Marxist Contra rebels in Nicaragua. In November 1986, Reagan issued a statement denying the arms sales. One week later, he confirmed that weapons had been transferred to Iran, but denied that they were part of an exchange for hostages. Later investigations by Congress and an independent counsel disclosed details of both operations and noted that documents relating to the affair were destroyed or withheld from investigators by Reagan administration officials on national security grounds. The revelation that profits from the arms sales had been illegally funneled to the Contras created a major political scandal for Reagan.

==== United States attack of 1988 ====
In 1988, the U.S. launched Operation Praying Mantis in retaliation for Iran mining the Persian Gulf during the Iran–Iraq War, following Operation Nimble Archer. It was the largest American naval operation since World War II, with strikes that destroyed two Iranian oil platforms and sank a major warship. Iran sought reparations at the International Court of Justice, but the court dismissed the claim. The attack helped pressure Iran into agreeing to a ceasefire with Iraq later that year.

==== 1988: Iran Air Flight 655 ====
On July 3, 1988, during the Iran–Iraq War, the U.S. Navy's USS Vincennes mistakenly shot down Iran Air Flight 655, a civilian Airbus A300B2, killing 290 people. The U.S. initially claimed the aircraft was a warplane and outside the civilian air corridor, but later acknowledged the downing was an accident in a combat zone. Iran, however, argued it was gross negligence and sued the U.S. in the International Court of Justice, resulting in compensation for the victims' families. The U.S. expressed regret, calling it a tragic accident, while the Vincennes crew received military honors.

=== George H. W. Bush administration 1989–1993 ===
Newly elected U.S. president George H. W. Bush announced a "goodwill begets goodwill" gesture in his inaugural speech on January 20, 1989. The Bush administration urged President of Iran Akbar Hashemi Rafsanjani to use Iran's influence in Lebanon to obtain the release of the remaining U.S. hostages held by Hezbollah. Bush indicated there would be a reciprocal gesture toward Iran by the United States.

Relevant background events during the first year of Bush's administration include the ending of the Iran–Iraq War and the death of Ayatollah Khomeini. Khomeini believed he had a sacred duty to purge Iran of what he saw as Western corruption and moral decay, aiming to restore the country to religious purity under Islamic theocratic rule. Khomeini was succeeded by Ali Khamenei.

=== Clinton administration 1993–2001 ===
In April 1995, a total oil and trade embargo on dealings with Iran by American companies was imposed by Bill Clinton. This ended trade, which had been growing following the end of the Iran–Iraq War. The next year, the American Congress passed the Iran-Libya Sanctions act, designed to prevent other countries from making large investments in Iranian energy. The act was denounced by the European CC as invalid.

==== Khatami and Iranian reformers ====
In January 1998, newly elected Iranian President Mohammad Khatami called for a "dialogue of civilizations" with the United States. In the interview, Khatami invoked Alexis de Tocqueville's Democracy in America to explain similarities between American and Iranian quests for freedom. American Secretary of State Madeleine Albright responded positively. This brought free travel between the countries as well as an end to the American embargo of Persian carpets and pistachios. Relations then stalled due to opposition from Iranian conservatives and American preconditions for discussions, including changes in Iranian policy on Israel, nuclear energy, and support for terrorism.

Four members of the United States Congress: Senator Arlen Specter, Representative Bob Ney, Representative Gary Ackerman, and Representative Eliot L. Engel held informal talks in New York City with several Iranian leaders in August 2000. The Iranians included Mehdi Karroubi, speaker of the Majlis of Iran (Iranian Parliament); Maurice Motamed, a Jewish member of the Majlis; and three other Iranian parliamentarians.

=== George W. Bush administration 2001–2009 ===
Iran–United States relations during the George W. Bush administration (2001–2009) were marked by heightened tensions, mutual distrust, and periodic attempts at limited engagement. Following the September 11 attacks in 2001, Iran initially was sympathetic with the United States.

Relations deteriorated sharply after President George W. Bush labeled Iran part of the "Axis of Evil" in 2002, accusing the country of pursuing weapons of mass destruction that posed a threat to the U.S. In 2003, Swiss Ambassador Tim Guldimann relayed an unofficial proposal to the U.S. outlining a possible "grand bargain" with Iran. He claimed it was developed in cooperation with Iran, but it lacked formal Iranian endorsement, and the Bush administration did not pursue the offer.

Between 2003 and 2008, Iran accused the United States of repeatedly violating its territorial sovereignty through drone incursions, covert operations, and support for opposition groups. In August 2005, Mahmoud Ahmadinejad became Iran's president. During his presidency, attempts at dialogue, including a personal letter to President Bush, were dismissed by U.S. officials, while public tensions grew over Iran's nuclear program, U.S. foreign policy, and Ahmadinejad's controversial remarks at international forums. The United States intensified covert operations against Iran, including alleged support for militant groups such as PEJAK and Jundullah, cross-border activities, and expanded CIA and Special Forces missions. Iran was repeatedly accused by the U.S. of arming and training Iraqi insurgents, including Shiite militias and groups linked to Hezbollah, with American officials citing captured weapons, satellite images, and detainee testimonies. During this period, additional flashpoints included the U.S. raid on Iran's consulate in Erbil, sanctions targeting Iranian financial institutions, a naval dispute in the Strait of Hormuz, and the public disclosure of covert action plans against Iran.

=== Obama administration 2009–2017 ===
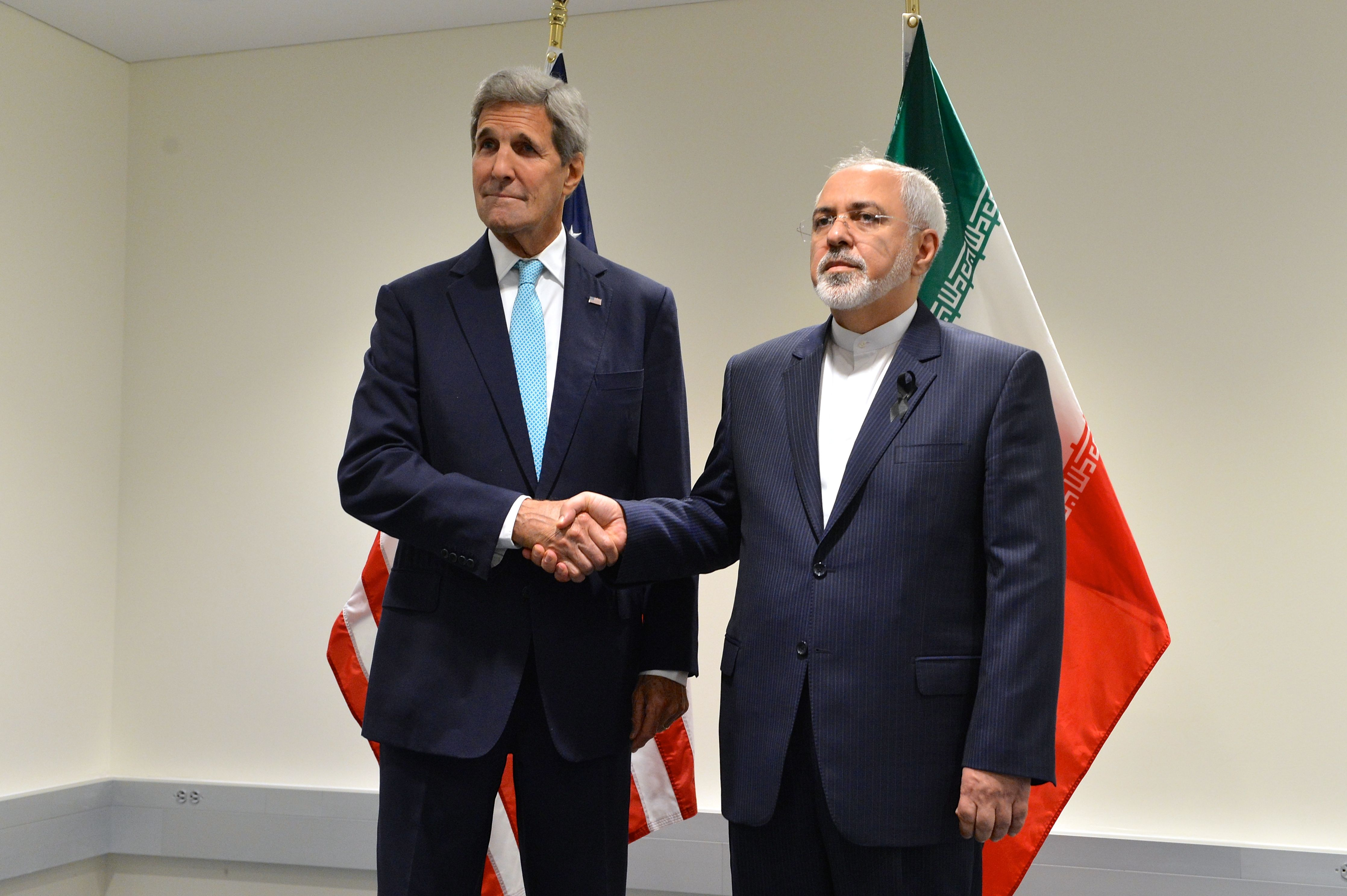
U.S. Secretary of State John Kerry and Iranian Foreign Minister Mohammad Javad Zarif in Lausanne, Switzerland to discuss the Iranian nuclear program, March 16, 2015

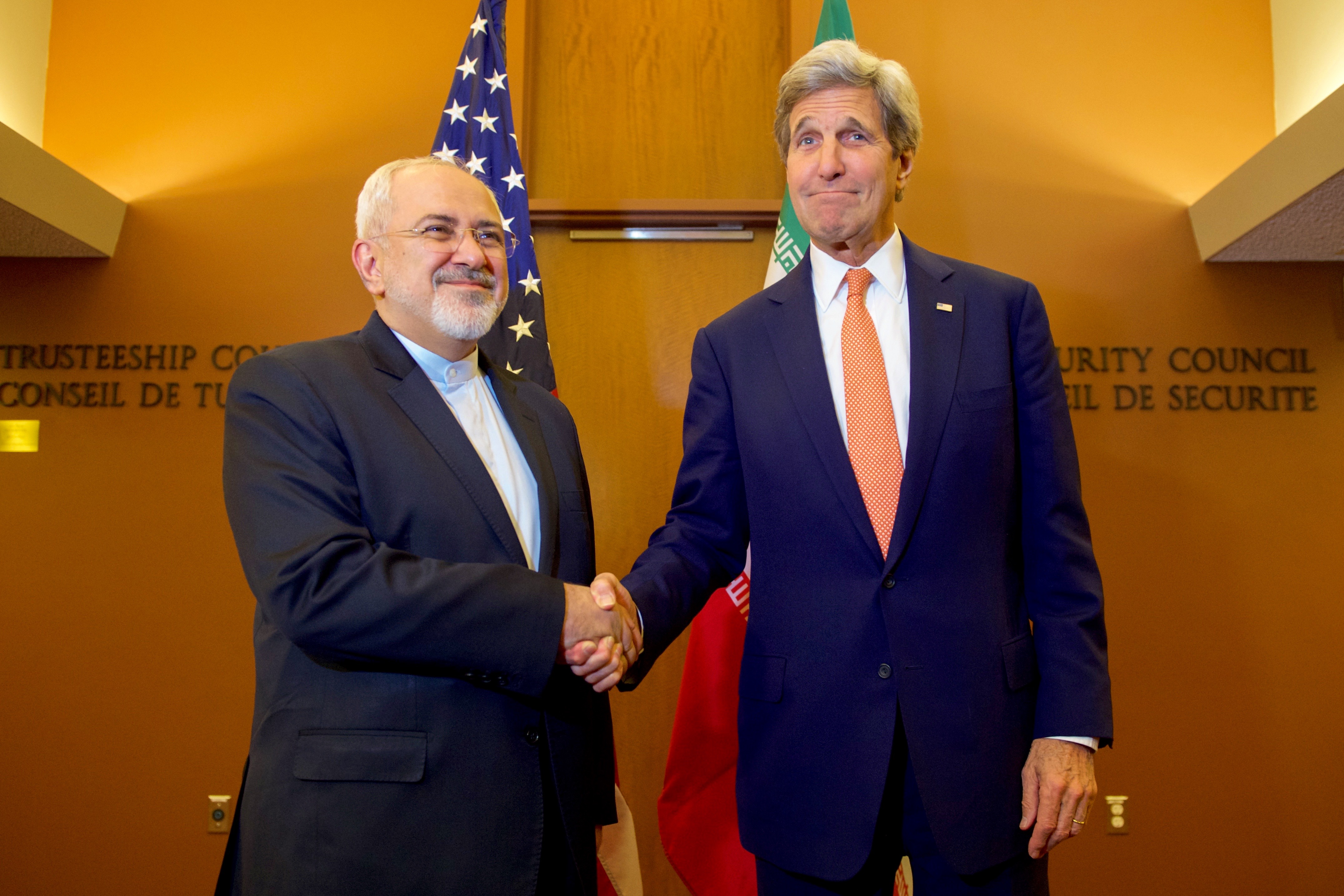
Secretary of State John Kerry shakes hands with Iranian Foreign Minister Javad Zarif at the UN Headquarters in New York on April 19, 2016

Iran–United States relations during the Obama administration (2009–2017) were defined by a shift from confrontation to cautious engagement, culminating in the landmark nuclear agreement of 2015.

At the start of Obama's presidency, both sides exchanged public messages signaling a possible thaw, with Iran voicing long-standing grievances and the United States calling for mutual respect and responsibility. However, after Mahmoud Ahmadinejad's disputed re-election in 2009, which sparked mass protests and allegations of fraud, the United States responded with skepticism and concern. In late 2011 and early 2012, Iran threatened to close the Strait of Hormuz and warned a U.S. aircraft carrier not to return to the Persian Gulf. The U.S. rejected the warning and maintained its naval presence, while experts doubted Iran's ability to sustain a blockade.

The 2013 election of President Hassan Rouhani, seen as a moderate, marked a shift in tone, with his outreach at the UN and a historic phone call with Obama signaling renewed diplomatic engagement. While high-level contact resumed and symbolic gestures were exchanged, conservative backlash in Iran highlighted internal divisions over rapprochement. In 2015, the United States and other world powers reached the Joint Comprehensive Plan of Action (JCPOA) with Iran, under which Iran agreed to limit its nuclear program in exchange for sanctions relief. The agreement marked a major diplomatic achievement for the Obama administration, though it faced skepticism in Congress and mixed public support in the U.S.

Despite the JCPOA, tensions between the United States and Iran persisted over ballistic missile tests, continued U.S. sanctions, and European business hesitancy due to fear of U.S. penalties. The administration also faced criticism for its handling of these issues, both from Iran and from political opponents.

=== First Trump administration 2017–2021 ===
Iran–United States relations during the first Trump administration (2017–2021) were marked by a sharp policy shift from Obama's engagement-oriented approach. Trump began with a travel ban affecting Iranian citizens, and withdrew from the Joint Comprehensive Plan of Action (JCPOA). A broader maximum pressure campaign followed, with over 1,500 sanctions targeting Iran's financial, oil, and shipping sectors, as well as foreign firms doing business with Iran, severely damaging its economy. The effort aimed to isolate Iran but met with strong resistance—even from U.S. allies—and often left Washington diplomatically isolated.

Iran responded by threatening to resume unrestricted uranium enrichment; rejecting negotiations with the Trump administration, and intensified rhetoric. Tensions escalated in 2019 with U.S. intelligence reports of Iranian threats, attacks on oil tankers, the downing of a U.S. drone by Iran, and suspected Iranian strikes on Saudi oil facilities. President Trump called off retaliatory strikes, opting for cyberattacks and additional sanctions instead.

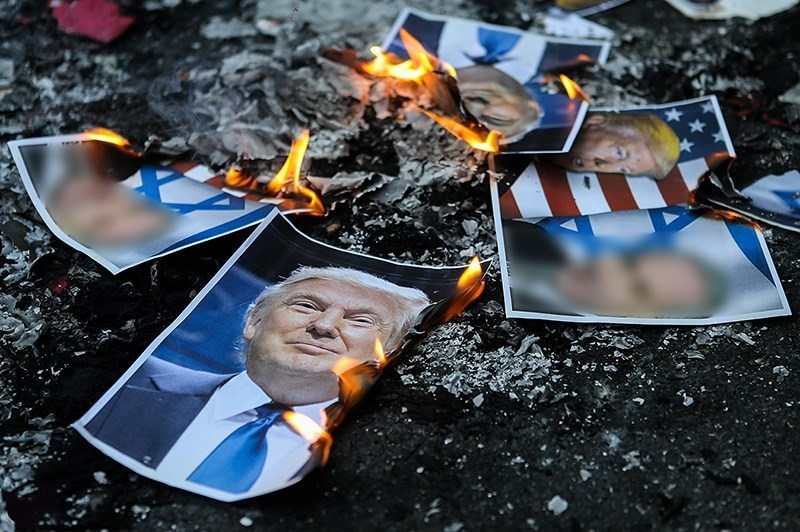
Iranians protest Donald Trump's Jerusalem declaration in Tehran, December 11, 2017

A major escalation followed a December 2019 rocket attack on the K-1 Air Base in Iraq, which led to American airstrikes on Iranian-backed militias and a retaliatory attack on the U.S. embassy in Baghdad. On January 3, 2020, the U.S. assassinated Iranian General Qasem Soleimani in a drone strike, prompting Iranian missile attacks on U.S. bases in Iraq and heightened fears of war. The crisis deepened with the accidental downing of a Ukrainian passenger plane by Iranian forces and continued through early 2020 with retaliatory strikes and threats.

Later in 2020, Iran blamed U.S. sanctions for limiting its COVID-19 response. They launched a military satellite, and were later accused of interfering in the U.S. presidential election and proxy attacks. Relations ended under Trump with continued hostility and unresolved disputes.

=== Biden administration 2021–2025 ===
Iran–United States relations during the Biden administration (2021–2025) were shaped by efforts to revive the 2015 nuclear agreement alongside ongoing regional tensions, sanctions, cyberattacks, and proxy conflicts. Early in Joe Biden's presidency, U.S. officials expressed interest in returning to the Joint Comprehensive Plan of Action (JCPOA), but negotiations in Vienna eventually stalled. Iran increased uranium enrichment and imposed retaliatory sanctions, while the U.S. imposed new sanctions over missile programs, oil exports, and human rights abuses.

Tensions persisted throughout this era, marked by recurring proxy attacks on U.S. bases, which intensified following the outbreak of the Gaza war in late 2023, and by subsequent American retaliatory strikes. The period also saw disputes over the assassination of Qasem Soleimani, and military escalations across the Gulf region. In 2023, a breakthrough occurred with a U.S.–Iran prisoner swap and the release of frozen Iranian funds, though indirect diplomacy remained fragile. Iran was later accused of interfering in the 2024 U.S. presidential election through cyber operations and AI disinformation. Alleged assassination plots targeting Donald Trump and dissidents on U.S. soil further strained relations. By late 2024, relations remained adversarial, marked by unresolved security disputes and growing mistrust.

=== Second Trump administration 2025–2026 ===
In November 2024, the U.S. Department of Justice alleged that Iran has attempted to assassinate U.S. officials and dissidents, including Trump. In February 2025, three weeks after his second inauguration, Trump said he had given the U.S. military and his advisors instructions to obliterate Iran if he were to be assassinated.

In February, Trump signed the return of the Maximum pressure campaign against the Iranian government.

Trump called for talks for a nuclear peace agreement.

In the Friday prayer of February 7, Khamenei dismissed negotiations and stated that the Iranian government should not make a deal with the U.S. February 9, Trump said that he would rather make a deal with Iranians than let them be bombed by Israel.

In March 2025, Khamenei stated that he did not intend to negotiate with Trump. IRGC General Salami threatened United States military with devastation. Trump threatened he would hold Iranian regime to blame for any shots fired by Houthis.

Putin and Trump reached an agreement that Iran should never be in a position to destroy Israel.

In April, Ali Larijani, advisor to Khamenei, threatened Trump that Iran would make nuclear weapons. Islamic Republic military allegedly had recommended a preemptively strike on U.S. military bases.

In April, Trump stated that Iranians want direct negotiations. Iran–United States negotiations began on April 12, 2025.

In April 2025, U.S. congressmen Joe Wilson and Jimmy Panetta introduced a 'Free Iraq from Iran' bill. The legislation mandates the development of a comprehensive U.S. strategy to irreversibly dismantle Iran-backed militias, including the Popular Mobilization Forces (PMF), and calls for the suspension of U.S. assistance to Iraq until these militias are fully removed. The bill also imposes sanctions on Iraqi political and military figures aligned with Iran, and provides support for Iraqi citizens and independent media to expose abuses committed by these militias. Its primary objective is to restore Iraq's sovereignty and reduce Iranian dominance without resorting to direct military intervention.

In his speech during his May 2025 trip to Middle East, Trump called out the Iranians as the most destructive force and denounced the Iran leaders for having managed to be turning green fertile farmland and rolling blackouts calling on it to make a choice between war and violence and making a deal. On June 7, 2025, the U.S. Treasury Department imposed sanctions on 10 individuals and 27 entities, including Iranian nationals and firms based in the UAE and Hong Kong. These targets include the Zarringhalam brothers, accused of laundering billions via shell companies tied to the IRGC and the Central Bank of Iran. The funds reportedly supported Iran's nuclear and missile programs, oil sales, and militant proxies.

Relations further worsened after Iranian authorities threatened to attack U.S. and allied bases in the Middle East if the former were to involve itself in the Iran–Israel war, after which the U.S. intervened in the Israeli attacks and bombed key Iranian nuclear sites.

On June 21, 2025, the U.S., under the orders of Trump, bombed three Iranian nuclear enrichment sites (Fordow, Natanz, and Isfahan), briefly joining the Iran–Israel war. Following the attacks, Iran pulled out and suspended nuclear talks indefinitely.

US bases in the Middle East

During the 2025–2026 Iranian protests, Trump repeatedly stated to the Iranian authorities that the U.S. would "intervene" if the Iranian government did not halt its crackdown on protesters.

In January 2026, during the widespread and increasingly violent crackdown on nationwide protests in Iran, Trump stated that the U.S. was seriously considering a range of responses, including potential military options, if Iranian government actions crossed established "red lines". Trump said that the U.S. military was evaluating "very strong options" and that senior advisers were scheduled to discuss possible actions, while also noting that Iranian leaders had reached out for negotiations. Iranian officials stated that Iranian forces would retaliate against U.S. forces and allied interests in the region if U.S. forces attacked. On January 16, 2026, Trump announced that the Iranian leadership had reportedly canceled over 800 planned executions. On January 27, 2026, following the deployment of the USS Abraham Lincoln to the region the day before, a multi-day U.S. aerial military drill in the region was announced. On the same day Trump said: "There is another beautiful war fleet sailing toward Iran right now." In addition, The Pentagon ordered U.S. Air Force F-15E Strike Eagles that were deployed at Royal Air Force Lakenheath in Britain to move forward to American air bases in Jordan. The January 2026 U.S. military buildup has been the largest concentration of air and naval assets in the region since the 2003 invasion of Iraq.

In February 2026, following the heightened tensions in January, Iran and the United States held a new round of diplomatic talks in Muscat, Oman, with Oman acting as a mediator. The discussions primarily focused on Iran's nuclear program and the potential easing of economic sanctions. The Iranian delegation was led by Foreign Minister Abbas Araghchi, while the U.S. delegation included senior officials from the State Department.

During the talks, the United States reportedly sought to address Iran's missile program and regional activities, whereas Iran emphasized that negotiations should remain limited to nuclear issues and sanctions relief. Both sides expressed commitment to continuing diplomatic engagement, though no immediate agreement was announced. Reports showed that Iran may have unbelievable flexibility towards further discussions in averting war.

The renewed dialogue was widely interpreted as an effort by both sides to prevent further escalation following the January tensions, amid concerns that miscalculation could lead to a broader regional confrontation.

==== 2026 Iran war ====
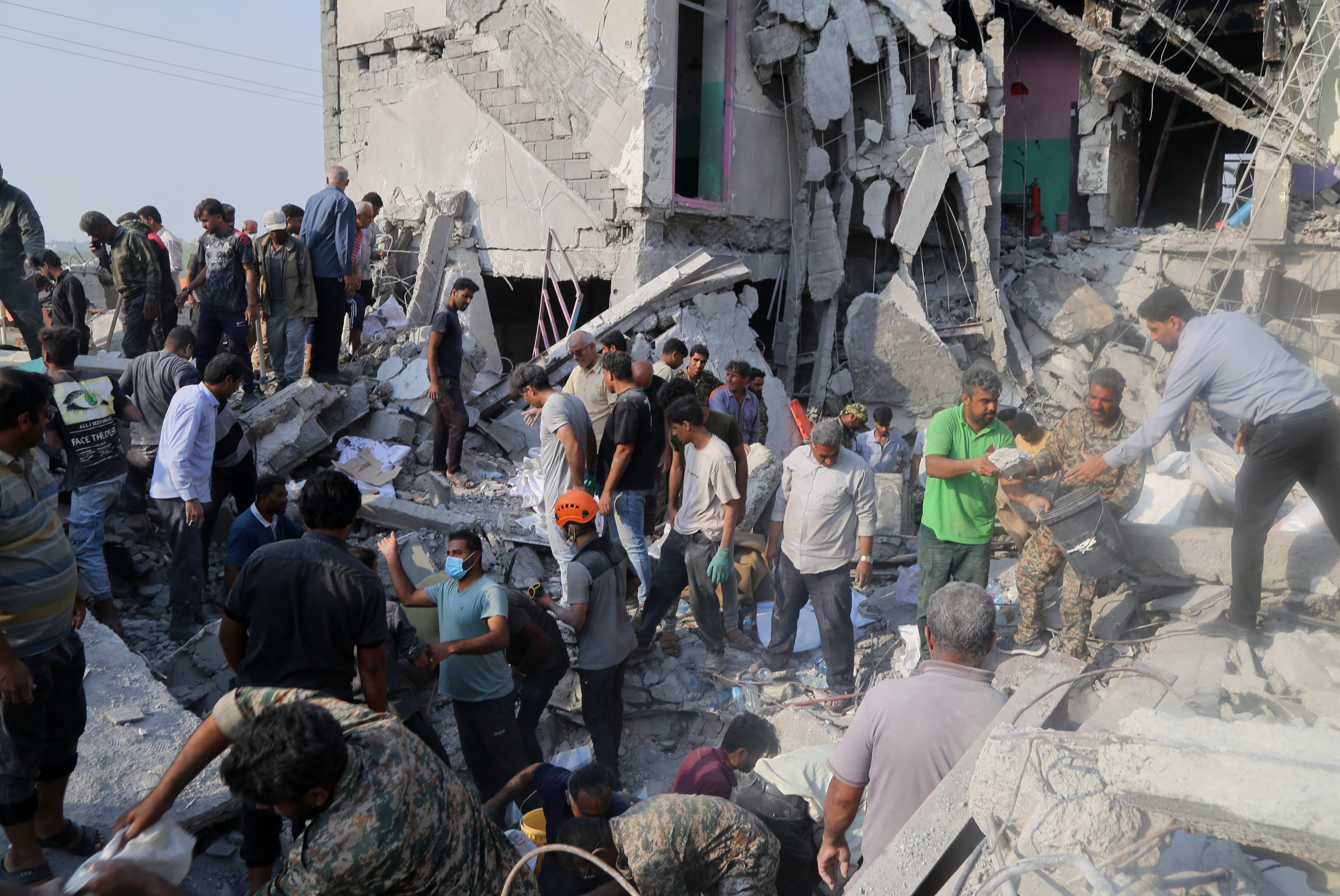
Rescuers and residents searching through the rubble of the Minab girls' elementary school, destroyed by the United States

On February 28, 2026, the United States and Israel launched a large-scale joint military operation against Iran.

On April 3, 2026, it was reported in Axios that the U.S. expelled Iran's deputy ambassador to the UN, in December 2025. The issue remained silenced as it concerned national security. The report said that deputy ambassador Saadat Aghajani was asked to leave the U.S. under "section 13 procedures", rather than declaring him persona non grata. On April 7, Katie Miller said that the U.S. was planning to revoke up to 4,000 visas of people with connections to the Iranian government.

Following Donald Trump's March 2026 assertion that it was not "appropriate" for Iran to participate in the 2026 World Cup due to safety concerns amid military conflict, the Iran national team issued a statement arguing that no one could exclude them and that the United States should instead be removed as host for failing to ensure the safety of participating teams.

In April 2026, U.S. special envoy Paolo Zampolli proposed that Italy replace Iran at the 2026 FIFA World Cup, prompting swift rejection from Italian officials who called the idea "not appropriate" and "shameful." Italian Sports Minister Andrea Abodi stated that qualification "must be earned on the pitch," while FIFA president Gianni Infantino reiterated that Iran would participate as scheduled.

On April 8, 2026, the United States and Iran agreed to a provisional two-week ceasefire ahead of planned negotiations in Pakistan. As part of the agreement, Tehran stated it would reopen the Strait of Hormuz to maritime traffic. Following the announcement of the conditional ceasefire, global oil prices experienced a sharp decline.

In April 2026, the Iranian-flagged container ship MV Touska was intercepted en route from Malaysia to Iran. According to Iranian sources and state media, the vessel was operating near the Gulf of Oman when it was targeted by United States naval forces as part of what they described as enforcement of a maritime blockade. Iranian reports stated that the ship was struck by the USS Spruance, which allegedly disabled its propulsion by firing on the engine room, after which U.S. Marines boarded and took control of the vessel. Iranian officials and media characterized the incident as an attack on a civilian commercial vessel and a violation of an existing ceasefire agreement.

According to statements from U.S. officials, the operation was conducted after warnings were issued to the vessel, which was alleged to be violating sanctions and attempting to breach a naval blockade. The U.S. administration stated that the ship was declared subject to sanctions and that its seizure was part of enforcement actions in the region. Iranian authorities further claimed that the incident triggered retaliatory actions in the region and cited it as evidence of a breakdown of the ceasefire arrangements.

According to data from Brown University's Iran War Energy Cost Tracker, as reported by Anadolu Agency on May 12, 2026, the war had cost American consumers more than $37.3 billion in additional energy prices since February 28, 2026.

According to a classified United States intelligence assessment from early May 2026, Iran has regained operational access to most of its missile sites. This includes 30 out of the 33 missile sites located along the Strait of Hormuz.

After more than three months of war, the United States and Iran announced on June 14, 2026, that they had agreed to halt hostilities. Mediated by Pakistan and Qatar, the memorandum of understanding was presented not as a final peace treaty but as a reported 60-day extension of the existing ceasefire, intended to lay the groundwork for a final settlement. Under its terms, the United States lifted its naval blockade and the Strait of Hormuz, closed for much of the war, was to be cleared of mines and reopened to shipping, while the 60-day window was set aside to negotiate limits on Iran's nuclear program, the disposal of its highly enriched uranium, sanctions relief, and the release of frozen Iranian assets. President Donald Trump and Pakistani Prime Minister Shehbaz Sharif characterized the agreement as a peace deal, and a formal signing ceremony was expected in Switzerland; Iranian officials were initially more cautious about confirming it, and some analysts in the United States and Israel doubted that a final agreement would follow.

In June 2026, Fox News Digital reported that the Trump administration was asking for $672 million as part of a larger $80 billion funding package linked to the Iran conflict, as discussions continued over a memorandum of understanding on Iran’s nuclear program. The funding would go toward removing and managing Iranian nuclear materials, including different forms of uranium, as well as inspection and verification work. A White House official said the money would support Department of Energy operations aimed at limiting Iran’s nuclear capabilities. This would include handling sensitive materials and infrastructure, supporting International Atomic Energy Agency inspections, improving nuclear smuggling detection, and expanding emergency response teams in the Middle East.

On July 3, President Trump declared that Iran had agreed to virtually all US demands.

In early July 2026, the June ceasefire memorandum appeared to begin breaking down. On July 9, 2026, the Associated Press reported that renewed U.S. strikes in Iran and Iranian missile and drone attacks across the Gulf were threatening the ceasefire arrangement. The AP described the truce as increasingly unstable after both sides resumed attacks in the region, raising doubts about whether the June agreement would hold.

In July 2026, Iran's UN ambassador Amir Saeid Iravani wrote to the UN Secretary-General and Security Council, accusing the U.S. of war crimes over military strikes on Iranian soil. The letter described attacks between July 8 and 16 that hit civilian infrastructure such as ports, airports, transport networks, communications hubs, radar and coastal defense systems, and grain silos. Iravani reported more than 35 dead and over 260 wounded, including civilians and first responders. He also cited President Trump's public threats against Iranian bridges and power plants, along with remarks about bombing Iran's nuclear sites, as proof of what he called "blatant disregard for the Charter of the United Nations and international law."

On October 5, 2026, during a campaign rally in Grand Island, Nebraska, Donald Trump spoke about the ongoing Iran-US conflict and its economic effects, including rising fuel prices. Trump said that the possible destruction of an American city by Iran would be a "small price to pay" compared to maintaining national security, directly mentioning Los Angeles and San Diego. Following his speech, California officials and some Republican politicians strongly criticized his remarks.

The White House, in response to the criticism, described it as a “media freakout”. White House communications director Steven Cheung also said in a social media post that the president was “clearly stating US cities would have been threatened if a nuclear Iran hadn’t been stopped”.

== Economic relations ==
Trade between Iran and the United States reached $623 million in 2008. According to the United States Census Bureau, American exports to Iran reached $93 million in 2007 and $537 million in 2008. American imports from Iran decreased from $148 million in 2007 to $86 million in 2008. This data does not include trade conducted through third countries to circumvent the trade embargo. It has been reported that the United States Treasury Department has granted nearly 10,000 special licenses to American companies over the past decade to conduct business with Iran.

US exports to Iran include cigarettes (US$73 million); corn (US$68 million); chemical wood pulp, soda or sulfate (US$64 million); soybeans (US$43 million); medical equipment (US$27 million); vitamins (US$18 million); and vegetable seeds (US$12 million).

In May 2013, U.S. president Barack Obama lifted a trade embargo of communications equipment and software to non-government Iranians. In June 2013, the Obama administration expanded its sanctions against Iran, targeting its auto industry and, for the first time, its currency.

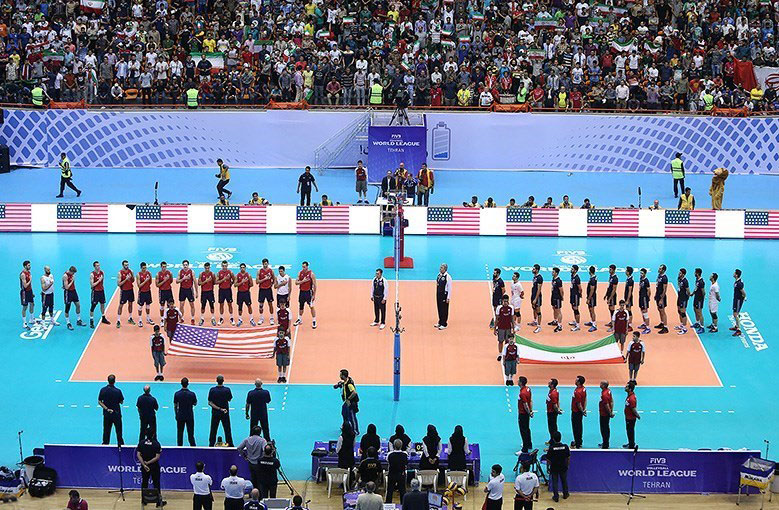
Fourth match between Iran and the U.S. during the 2015 FIVB Volleyball World League

According to a 2014 study by the National Iranian American Council, sanctions cost the U.S. over $175 billion in lost trade and 279,000 lost job opportunities.

According to Business Monitor International:

The tentative rapprochement between Iran and the US, which began in the second half of 2013, has the potential to become a world-changing development, and unleash tremendous geopolitical and economic opportunities, if it is sustained. Tehran and Washington have been bitter enemies since 1979, when the Iranian Revolution overthrew the pro-American Shah and replaced him with a virulently anti-American Islamist regime. Since then, Iran has been at the vanguard of countries actively challenging the US-led world order. This has led to instability in the Middle East, and Iran's relative isolation in international affairs. Yet, if Iran and the US were to achieve a diplomatic breakthrough, geopolitical tensions in the Middle East could decline sharply, and Iran could come to be perceived as a promising emerging market in its own right.

On April 22, 2019, under the Trump administration, the U.S. demanded that buyers of Iranian oil stop purchases or face economic penalties, announcing that the six-month sanction exemptions for China, India, Japan, South Korea and Turkey instated a year prior would not be renewed and would end by May 1. The move was seen as an attempt to completely stifle Iran's oil exports. Iran insisted the sanctions were illegal and that it had attached "no value or credibility" to the waivers. U.S. Secretary of State Mike Pompeo said President Trump's decision not to renew the waivers showed his administration was "dramatically accelerating our pressure campaign in a calibrated way that meets our national security objectives while maintaining well supplied global oil markets". On April 30, Iran stated it would continue to export oil despite U.S. pressure.

On May 8, 2019, exactly one year after the Trump administration withdrew the United States from the Joint Comprehensive Plan of Action, the U.S. imposed a new layer of duplicate sanctions on Iran, targeting its metal exports, a sector that generates 10 percent of its export revenue. The move came amid escalating tension in the region and just hours after Iran threatened to start enriching more uranium if it did not get relief from U.S. measures that are crippling its economy. The Trump administration has said the sanctions will only be lifted if Iran fundamentally changes its behavior and character.

On June 24, 2019, following continued escalations in the Strait of Hormuz, President Donald Trump announced new targeted sanctions against Iranian and IRGC leadership, including Supreme Leader Ali Khamenei and his office. IRGC targets included Naval commander Alireza Tangsiri, Aerospace commander Amir Ali Hajizadeh, and Ground commander Mohammad Pakpour, and others. U.S. Treasury Secretary Steven Mnuchin said the sanctions will block "billions" in assets.

The U.S. Treasury Department Financial Crimes Enforcement Network imposed a measure that further prohibits the U.S. banking system from use by an Iranian bank, thereby requiring U.S. banks to step up due diligence on the accounts in their custody.

The U.S. Department of Treasury's Office of Foreign Assets Control (OFAC) blacklisted four Iranian metal sector organizations along with their foreign subsidiaries, on July 23, 2020. One German subsidiary and three in the United Arab Emirates—owned and controlled by Iran's biggest steel manufacturer, Mobarakeh Steel Company—were also blacklisted by Washington for yielding millions of dollars for Iran's aluminum, steel, iron, and copper sectors. The sanctions froze all U.S. assets controlled by the companies in question and further prohibited Americans from associating with them.

President Trump after signing the Sanctioning Russia and Iran Act in the Oval Office, September 18, 2026

On October 8, 2020, the U.S. Treasury Department placed sanctions on 18 Iranian banks. Any American connection to these banks is to be blocked and reported to the Office of Foreign Assets Control, and, 45 days after the sanctions take effect, anyone transacting with these banks may "be subject to an enforcement action." Treasury Secretary Steven Mnuchin said the goal was to pressure Iran to end nuclear activities and terrorist funding.

On October 30, 2020, it was revealed that the U.S. had "seized Iranian missiles shipped to Yemen", and it had "sold 1.1 million barrels of previously seized Iranian oil that was bound for Venezuela" in two shipments: the Liberia-flagged Euroforce and Singapore-flagged Maersk Progress, and sanctioned 11 new Iranian entities.

In February 2026, Donald Trump issued an executive order imposing tariffs of up to 25 percent on nations engaged in trade with Iran. The policy focuses on Iran's commercial partners rather than the country itself and aims to reduce international transactions with Iran, even as diplomatic talks continued.

== Sources of the socio-political tensions ==
The antagonism has been explained in part by an incompatibility of social values, the resistance to American hegemony, and its US support for Israel. In the West, however, various explanations have been considered, including the Iranian government's need for an external bogeyman to furnish a pretext for domestic repression against pro-democratic forces and to bind the government to its loyal constituency. The United States attributes the worsening of relations to the 1979–81 Iran hostage crisis, Iran's repeated human rights abuses since the Islamic Revolution, different restrictions on using spy methods on democratic revolutions by the U.S., its anti-Western ideology, its nuclear program, and political, financial, and military support to armed groups committed primarily to countering the influence of U.S. and Israel in the West Asia.

== Public opinion ==
=== Iranians ===
Research has shown that most Iranians hold a positive attitude about the American people, though not the U.S. government.

According to a 2019 survey by IranPoll, 13% of Iranians have a favorable view of the United States, with 86% expressing an unfavourable view, the most unfavorable perception of the United States in the world.

According to the University of Maryland's School of Public Policy report Iranian Public Opinion in the Early Days of the Pezeshkian Administration released in May 2025, public opinion in Iran toward the United States has shifted significantly over time. According to survey data, the perception of America as a dangerous country increased from 46% in 2005 to 66% in 2019, before slightly declining to 64% in March 2024. Conversely, views of the United States as a model country for its values and freedoms declined sharply, from 37% in 2005 to 12% in 2019 and further to 9% in 2024. Meanwhile, the proportion of respondents who considered America to be no better or worse than other countries rose steadily, from 14% in 2005 to 20% in 2019 and 25% in March 2024, indicating a gradual normalization alongside persistent negative perceptions.

=== Americans ===
In NORC polling conducted in 1952 ahead of the coup d'état the following year, 35% of Americans said that it would matter a "great deal" if communists took control of Iran. Public concern about Iran was generally limited before the 1979 Iran hostage crisis. After the September 11 attacks made much of the public fearful of future acts of terrorism, concerns about Iran intensified. In 2004, 58% of Americans said that they felt that Iran posed a long-term threat to the United States. Many Americans at the time viewed Iran unfavorably and thought it posed a threat to the United States and other countries.

According to a 2018 Pew poll, 39% of Americans say that limiting the power and influence of Iran should be a top foreign policy priority.

According to a 2013 BBC World Service poll, 5% of Americans view Iranian influence positively, with 87% expressing a negative view, the most unfavorable perception of Iran in the world.

According to a 2026 Gallup poll, only 13% of Americans have favorable opinions of Iran, while 79% have an unfavorable opinion. This was the second most negative ranking Americans gave out of the 21 foreign countries surveyed.

== See also ==
- US foreign policy in the Middle East
- Foreign relations of Iran
- Foreign relations of the United States
- Iran–Israel relations
- Embassy of Iran, Washington, D.C.
- Embassy of the United States, Tehran
- Ambassadors of Iran to the United States
- Ambassadors of the United States to Iran
- 2026 United States F-15E rescue operation in Iran
- Letter from the IRGC to the American people
