= Flight (disambiguation) =

Flight is the process by which an object moves without direct support from a surface.

Flight may also refer to:

== Arts, entertainment, and media ==
=== Films ===
- Flight (1929 film), an American adventure film
- Flight (2009 film), a South Korean drama film
- Flight (2012 film), an American film directed by Robert Zemeckis and starring Denzel Washington
- Flight (2021 film), an Indian action thriller film
- The Flight (1970 film), a Soviet film
- The Flight (2026 film), a Canadian documentary
- Adajya (English title: The Flight), a 1996 Indian Assamese-language film by Santwana Bordoloi

=== Literature ===
- "Flight" (Lessing story), a 1957 short story by Doris Lessing
- Flight (novel), a 2007 novel by Sherman Alexie
- Flight (play), a 1927 by Mikhail Bulgakov
- "Flight" (Steinbeck story), a 1938 short story by John Steinbeck
- Flights (novel), a 2007 novel by Olga Tokarczuk

=== Music ===
==== Albums and EPs ====
- Flight (Building 429 album) (2002)
- Flight (Cesium 137 album) (2008)
- Flight (Thorgeir Stubø album) (1988)
- Flight, an album by Windsor Airlift (2010)
- The Flight [Lux], an EP by Edge of Dawn (2005)

==== Songs ====
- "Flight" (song), a 2014 song by Lifehouse
- "Flight", a song by A Certain Ratio from The Graveyard and the Ballroom
- "Flight", a song by Joe Morris from Singularity
- "Flight", a song by Neurosis from Souls at Zero

==== Other uses in music ====
- Flight (opera), an opera by Jonathan Dove (1998)
- Flights (band), a British rock band
- The Flight (band), a duo that produces music for film, television and video games

=== Television ===
- Flight (TV series), a 1958 syndicated anthology series hosted by George Kenney
- "Flight" (Grey's Anatomy), a 2012 episode of Grey's Anatomy
- "Flight" (Prison Break), a 2006 episode of Prison Break

=== Other uses in arts, entertainment, and media ===
- Flight (comics) (2005)
- Flight (magazine), a magazine founded in 1909
- Flight (sculpture), an artwork at the Lynden Sculpture Garden
- Microsoft Flight, a video game/simulation
- The Flight, a Marvel Comics superhero team of 1992

== Military ==
- Flight (military unit)
- Flight sergeant, a senior non-commissioned rank in the Royal Air Force and several other air forces

== Sports ==
- Flight (cricket), a sports term
- In flight, a condition in baseball before a batted ball has touched anything other than a fielder or their gear

== People ==
- Howard Flight (1948–2026), British Conservative politician

== Other uses ==
- Flight (advertising)
- Flight (horse), an Australian racehorse
- Fletching or flight, part of an arrow
- Flight of stairs
- Air travel
- A flight number designating an airline service
- Attachment used to move material in a flight conveyor
- A beer flight, used to sample many different beers

== See also ==
- Fight-or-flight response
- Flighting (disambiguation)
- Fly (disambiguation)
- Take Flight (disambiguation)
