= Flite =

Flite may refer to:

- A small run-time speech synthesis engine used by Festival Speech Synthesis System
- A new name for Widgetbox (a San Francisco, California based company that enables businesses to create and deliver applications to their customers)
- A quarrel, dispute, wrangling; a scolding: see wiktionary:flite

== See also ==
- Flight (disambiguation)
- Flyte (disambiguation)
