= 2022–2023 Iranian diaspora protests =

2022–2023 Iranian Diaspora Protests
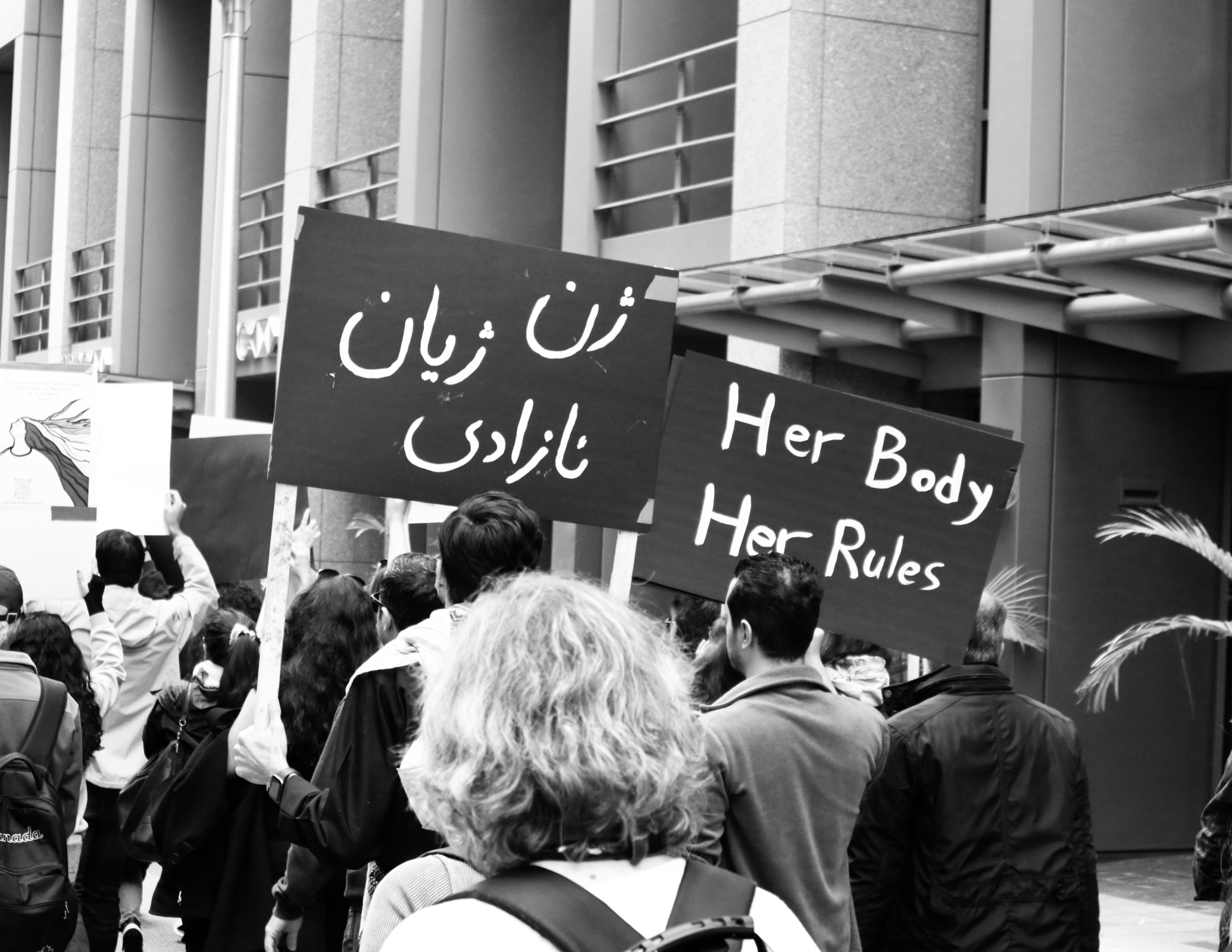
- Protest in Canada
- Date: September 2022 – 2023
- Location: Worldwide (including Canada, USA, Europe, Australia, Asia)
- Participants: Iranian diaspora and supporters worldwide

The 2022–2023 Iranian diaspora protests were a series of global demonstrations held by Iranian expatriates and supporters around the world in solidarity with the 2022–2023 Iranian protests inside Iran. These protests began following the death of Mahsa Amini, a young Iranian woman who died in the custody of Iran's morality police, sparking widespread outrage. The diaspora protests condemned the violent crackdown by the Iranian government on peaceful protesters, demanding justice, freedom, and human rights.

== Background ==
The death of Mahsa Amini on September 16, 2022, ignited widespread protests across Iran against the government's strict dress codes, authoritarianism, and human rights abuses. The Iranian diaspora worldwide mobilized to express solidarity and raise international awareness of the ongoing repression in Iran.

== Timeline and Locations ==
Between late 2022 and throughout 2023, Iranians and their supporters organized demonstrations in over 150 cities worldwide.

=== Canada ===
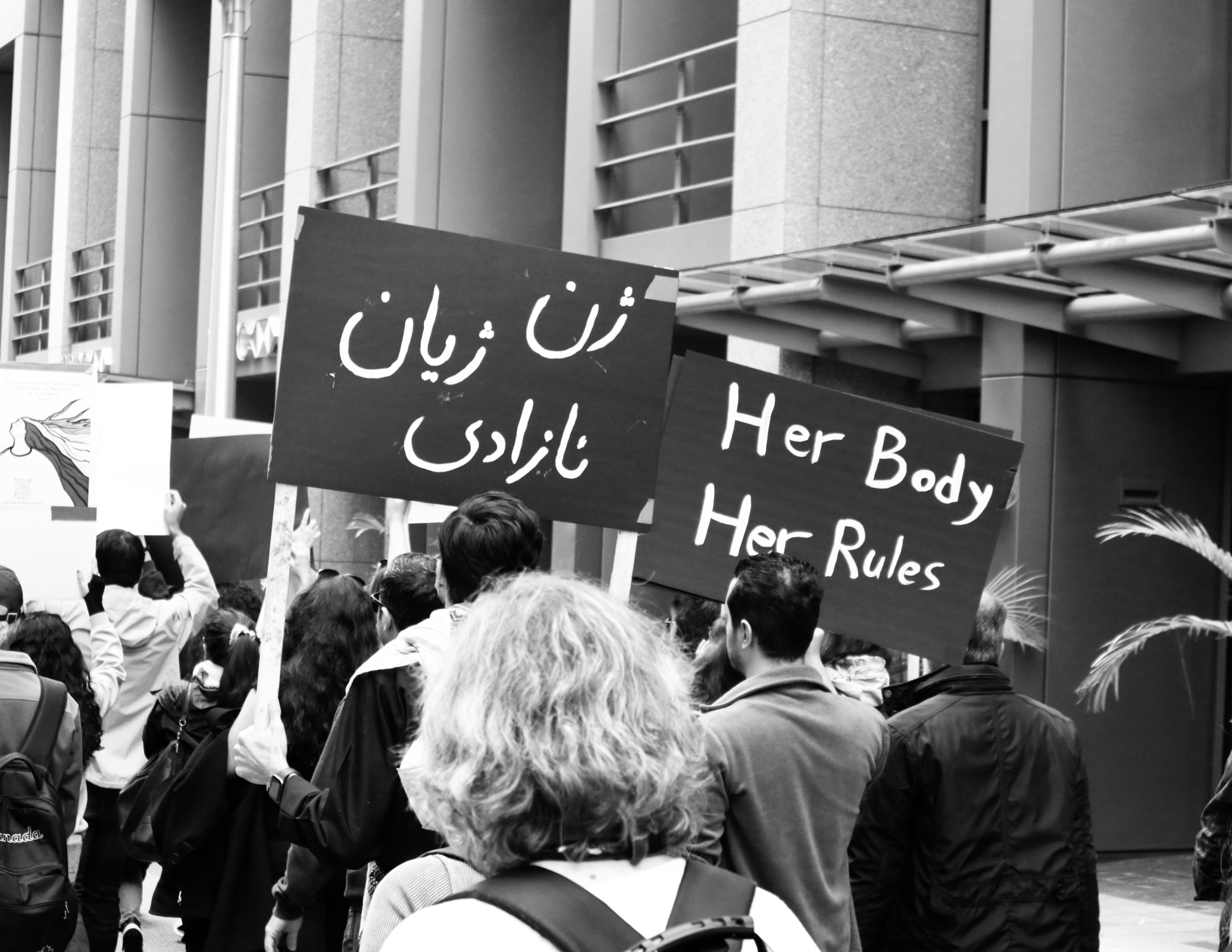
Protest in Canada

Protests were held in many Canadian cities with some of the largest gatherings occurring in:

- Toronto — Estimates report around 50,000 participants.
- Calgary
- Greater Sudbury
- Saskatoon
- Montreal
- Regina
- Ottawa
- Vancouver
- Edmonton
- St. John's, Newfoundland and Labrador

=== United States ===
Protests occurred in multiple states and cities including:

- Arizona
- Houston, Texas
- Dallas, Texas
- Seattle, Washington
- Los Angeles, California
- Chicago, Illinois
- Washington, D.C.
- New York City
- Boston, Massachusetts
- Massachusetts (general)
- Florida
- Denver, Colorado

==== February 11, 2023 Los Angeles Protest ====
On February 11, 2023 (22 Bahman in the Iranian calendar), the largest Iranian demonstration in the history of the United States took place in Los Angeles. The Los Angeles Police Department estimated attendance at approximately 100,000 participants.

=== United Kingdom ===
- Cardiff
- Newcastle upon Tyne
- Liverpool
- Birmingham
- Glasgow
- London
- Manchester

=== Australia ===
- Brisbane
- Sydney
- Melbourne
- Perth
- Adelaide

=== France ===
- Paris
- Strasbourg — Approximately 12,000 protesters gathered on January 16, 2023, in front of the European Parliament.

=== Austria ===
- Vienna

=== Norway ===
- Oslo — Demonstrations took place in front of the Norwegian Parliament (Stortinget)

=== Turkey ===
- Istanbul
- Izmir

=== New Zealand ===
- Auckland

=== Indonesia ===
- Jakarta

=== Armenia ===
- Yerevan

=== South Korea ===
- Seoul

=== Italy ===
- Rome

=== Netherlands ===
- Amsterdam

=== Japan ===
- Tokyo

=== Czech Republic ===
- Prague

=== Germany ===
Several large protests occurred in Germany, notably:

- Berlin — Estimated 80,000 participants attended the demonstration.

==== Berlin ====
The Berlin protest on October 22, 2022, attracted Iranians from all over Germany and Europe. It was organized by Hamed Esmaeilion, spokesperson for the Association of Families of Flight PS752 Victims.

== Reactions ==
The protests received wide coverage internationally, with various governments and human rights organizations condemning the Iranian government's crackdown. Many diaspora communities continued to organize rallies, sit-ins, and cultural events to maintain pressure on international authorities for intervention and awareness.

== See also ==
- (in Persian) Article in Persian Wikipedia
- 2022–2023 Iranian protests
- Mahsa Amini
- Iranian diaspora
- 2026 Iranian diaspora protests
