= Association of Families of Flight PS752 Victims =

Memorial organization

The Association of Families of Flight PS752 Victims
- Formation: 2020; 6 years ago
- Type: Nonprofit
- President: Alborz Sadeghi
- Spokesperson: Kourosh Doustshenas
- Board of directors: Alborz Sadeghi (President); Navaz Ebrahim (Vice President); Kourosh Doustshenas (Spokesperson); Maral Gorginpour (Secretary); Azamat Azhdari; Mohsen Ahmadipour; Hamed Esmaeilion; Shahnaz Morattab
- Website: ps752justice.com

The Association of Families of Flight PS752 Victims is a not-for-profit organization that represents the families of 140 of the victims of the 8 January 2020 downing of Flight PS752 of Ukraine International Airlines. The association is independent, with no ties to any political parties or movements; it has been established to keep the memories of the passengers alive, unite the grieving families of victims, and seek justice after flight PS752 was targeted by the Islamic Revolutionary Guard Corps (IRGC).

== Mission ==
"We are searching for the truth behind the downing of a civilian airplane shot by the Iranian Revolutionary Guard Corps (IRGC) and we are seeking to serve justice against the convicts, perpetrators, and commanders of this horrific crime in an independent and impartial court."

— Association's official website

This Association has published an investigative Fact-Finding Report for the downing PS752 flight. Some disputable and controversial evidence such as "deliberate opening of the Iranian sky in a war condition", "the changes in other flights' routes", "full destruction of passengers' electronic devices", "suspicious 57 minutes' delay for taking off", and "off-boarding few passengers" have all been pointed out within that report. After releasing this investigative report, the Association announced its intention to bring the case to the International Court of Justice.

Protests against the crime and worldwide rallies for justice as well as holding virtual anniversaries in memory of the Ukrainian flight victims are among other activities of the Association.

== Passengers ==
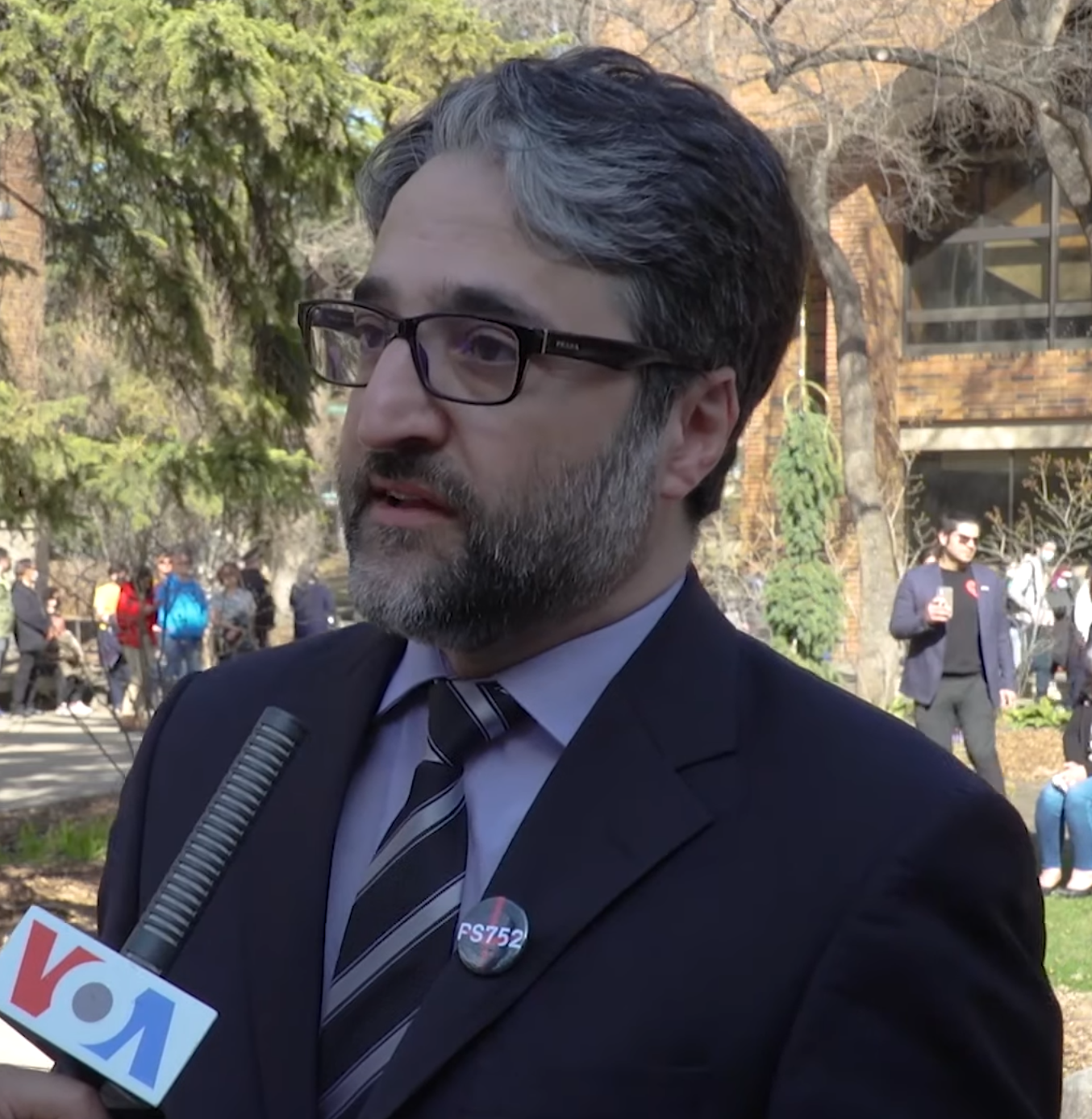
Hamed Esmaeilion, president of the association, doing an interview with VOA about Flight 752

According to the speaker of the Iranian national aviation agency, the number of victims was 176, including 167 passengers and 9 flight crew.

According to Iranian officials, 146 passengers used Iranian passports to leave Iran, and most of them were heading back to Canada via Ukraine after their winter holidays. According to Ukrainian foreign minister Vadym Prystaiko and a flight manifest released by UIA, out of the 167 passengers, 82 were confirmed to be Iranian citizens, while 63 were Canadians. 30 of the Iranian citizens had been living in Canada and were returning home. According to Iranian nationality law, the Iranian government considers dual citizens to be solely Iranian citizens. Canadian prime minister Justin Trudeau stated that out of 167 passengers on the plane, 138 were traveling to Canada. This tragedy was the biggest Canadian casualty of aviation incidents since the bombing of Air India Flight 182 in 1985.

Of the 167 passengers, 70 were men, 81 women, 15 children, and one infant.

== Cultural depictions ==
The 2022 documentary film 752 Is Not a Number, directed by Babak Payami, focused directly on the personal story of Hamed Esmaeilion, the organization's founding president, while The Flight, a 2026 documentary film directed by Soran Mardookhi, centred on the wider community response that resulted in the launch of the organization.

== See also ==
- Ukraine International Airlines Flight 752 § Passengers and crew
