= Tasting flight =

Tasting flight may refer to

- a beer flight
- a wine tasting flight
