= Beer Judge Certification Program =

Non-profit organization

The Beer Judge Certification Program (BJCP) is a non-profit organization formed in 1985 to recognize beer tasting and evaluation skills. The BJCP certifies and ranks beer judges through an examination and monitoring process.

== Purpose ==
The BJCP has three functions within the world-wide beer community. First, it provides a standards-based organization supplying qualified judges to both amateur and commercial brewing competitions designed to promote the appreciation of beer styles and their accurate production by brewers. The BJCP tracks members' participation as judges, organizers, or stewards in BJCP-sanctioned brewing competitions and awards continuing education units for participation.

The BJCP also publishes style guidelines categorizing beer, mead, and cider styles. These guidelines are used in both the examination of Judges by the BJCP and, voluntarily, by brewing competition organizers; the BJCP also encourages prospective test-takers to study the available literature on styles and brewing. New style guidelines were released in May 2015. As well as better addressing world styles, the BJCP Style Guidelines comprise three separate documents for beer, mead, and cider styles, allowing them to be updated on different schedules.

Finally, the BJCP organizes a program of beer examinations wherein test-takers complete a series of written questions regarding brewing, beer styles and judging and then perform six beer judging exercises.

== Organization ==
Judges are ranked within the certification program based upon a combination their score on a standardized certification test and experience points received for participating in sanctioned competition program events, in BJCP exams, or continuing education program events. The ranks include Apprentice, Recognized, Certified, National, Master, Grand Master (with incremental levels, for example Grand Master I, Grand Master II, etc.), and Honorary Grand Master. The BJCP also certifies judges in mead and cider.

== Influence ==
Its standards for beers have been cited by The Wall Street Journal and by Zymurgy, the journal for members of the American Homebrewers Association, among others. Its judges are regularly invited to judge the most prestigious competitions in the world, to include the National Homebrew Competition, Great American Beer Festival, and World Beer Cup in the United States.

== History ==
The BJCP was founded in 1985, when the first exam was given at the American Homebrewers Association (AHA) annual conference in Estes Park, Colorado. During its formative years, the program was jointly sponsored by the AHA and the Home Wine and Beer Trade Association (HWBTA). Both organizations sanctioned local homebrew competitions, and each had a national competition. Consequently, both were interested in fostering the improvement of judging skills and building up a pool of experienced beer judges. The program was administered at the AHA offices, and there were two Co-Directors, one from each association. Jim Homer was the AHA Co-Director, and Pat Baker served the same role for the HWBTA.

In August 1995, after a successful ten-year history, support was withdrawn by the AHA, which had intentions of starting its own beer judging program. The HWBTA was unable to continue operating the program by itself, so the BJCP was expected to simply fade away. However, a considerable number of judges had been built up by this time, and many of them were quite active. A small number of these activists decided that the program could be operated solely by volunteers from among themselves, and decided to attempt the continuation of the BJCP as an independent entity.

The effort was coordinated in a haphazard fashion, mainly through e-mail, but a consensus gradually emerged and the program was able to continue its growth. A board of directors was established to guide the program, composed of six (currently ten) Regional Representatives elected by members from each of seven geographical regions throughout North America. The U.S. was divided into geographic regions, and an election for the board of directors was held by mailing ballots to members.

Assisting the board was program administrator Russ Wigglesworth, who remained in his post and assumed the duties of maintaining the database of members, sending program materials to competition organizers, providing certificates and pins to new and newly promoted judges, and performing other essential administrative tasks. Wigglesworth remains in his position, but began to transfer his duties to other members in 2004 and as of 2006 this transfer is nearly complete.

In the early years, there were regional elections for the Board, conducted entirely by postal ballot, and a newsletter was published for several years to inform the membership. An annual letter was also sent by the Program Administrator to each member, listing the experience points earned from judging in various competitions. These activities are now done electronically, with the BJCP website serving as the repository of information including a password-protected section where members can check their personal record, and website voting, competition registration, and point reporting.

In 2007, former BJCP Treasurer William R. Slack was indicted for mail fraud in the District Court of the District of New Hampshire. Slack later entered a plea agreement. Mr. Slack admitted that he misappropriated BJCP funds steadily during his tenure as BJCP Treasurer. Mr. Slack was sentenced to (1) restitution of approximately $43K, (2) five years probation, and (3) incarceration of one week per month for twelve months.

== See also ==
- Beer sommelier
- Beer style
