= Beer tasting =

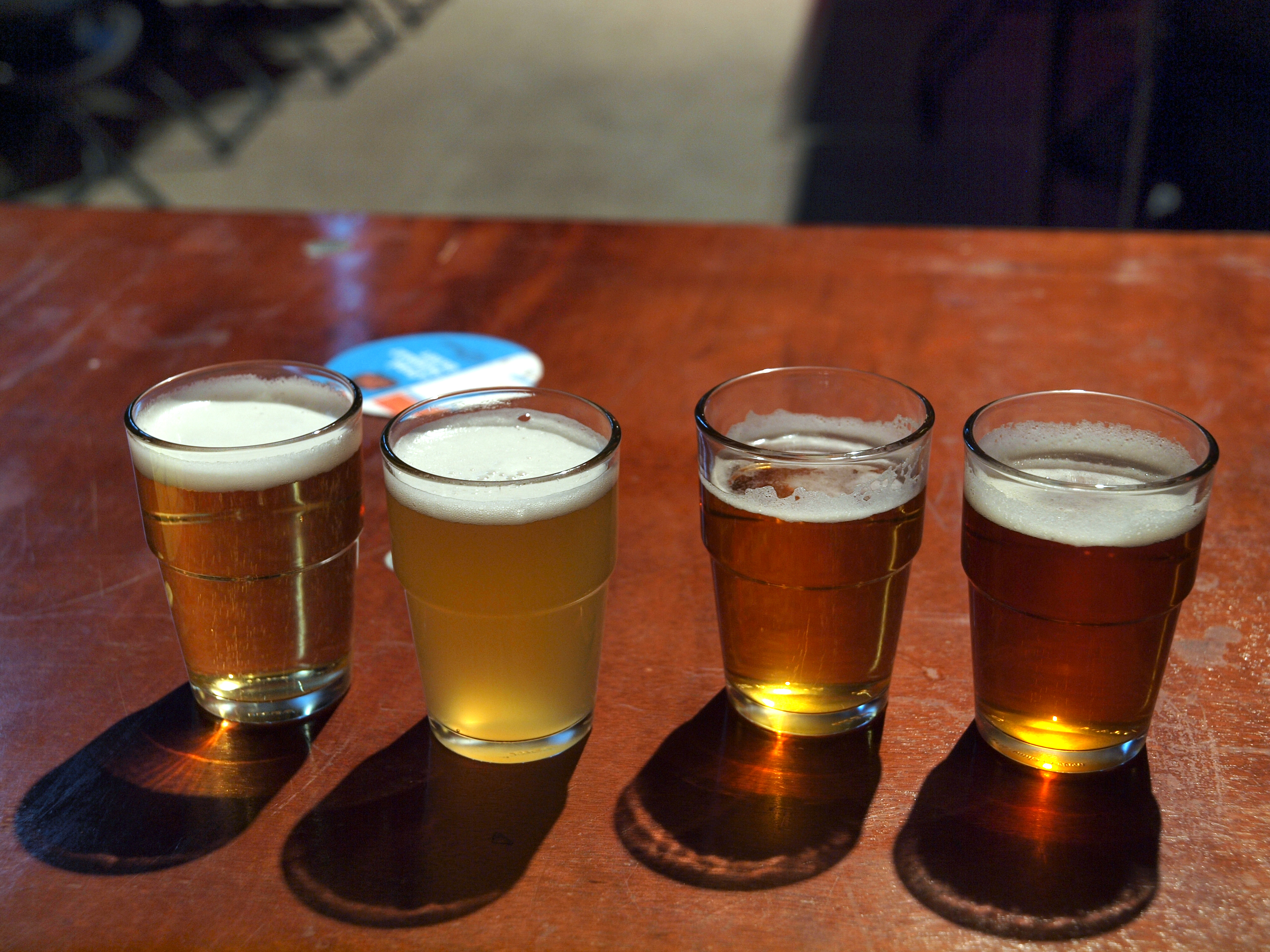
Four different beers to taste at a beer tasting at the Helsinki Beer Festival in Helsinki, Finland.

Beer tasting is the experience of sampling beer. Depending on how the tasting is designed, it can be a way to learn more about the history, ingredients and production of beer as well as different beer styles, hops, yeast and beer presentation. A common way is to analyze the appearance, smell and taste of the beer. Most tastings, include a final judgement of the beer's quality.

There are many scales for rating beer among beer journalists and beer sommeliers. Different magazines and experts often use their own scale, for example the famous British sommelier Jancis Robinson uses a scale between 1 and 20 and the famous American sommelier Joshua M. Bernstein uses a scale between 1 and 100. However it is common for professional organisations such as the Wine & Spirit Education Trust to rate beer with verbal grades: faulty - poor - acceptable - good - very good - outstanding, corresponding to a scale from 1 to 5.

== Themes ==
First, a selection of beers is chosen for the tasting. A theme can be for example Belgian beers or a selection of beers of varying bitterness. Beers are often tasted in an order from lightest to heaviest, driest to sweetest and cheapest to most expensive. This forms a basic structure of the tasting, but it is more important to organise the tasting according to how the human tastebuds work. As tasting progresses, the tastebuds become less sensitive and can even be anaesthesised.

Some tasting menus will focus on themes: for example, different types of beer such as stout, wheat beer or India pale ale, different countries such as Belgian beers or American pale ales, or different pairings of food with the tasting, such as a tasting of beers and cheeses.

== Glass ==
Choosing a glass for beer tasting is more important than one might think. An ISO standard tasting glass is often used in professional tastings, which is the standard for tasting different beverages. This type of glass is used by many tasters throughout the world to ensure the glass does not affect their judgement. The glass should be large enough to capture the aroma of the beer when it is twisted around on the bottom of the glass. The glass should have a foot so that the container part is not stained or warmed by the hands.

== Blind tasting ==
A common form of beer tasting is so-called blind tasting. In this type of tasting the taster does not know which beer is in which glass, for example by shrouding the bottle in an opaque container as it is poured. An experienced taster can have an idea of what the beer is by clues in the beer's appearance, smell and taste. This is however becoming more difficult as the number of different beer brands and styles is growing.

== See also ==
- Beer flight
- Beer sommelier
