= Rich Kids of Tehran =

Iranian Instagram account

Rich Kids Of Tehran (stylized as #RichKidsofTehran or #RKOT) is an Instagram account that posts photographs detailing the lives of young wealthy individuals (Aghazadeh) in Tehran, Iran. The account is based on its American counterpart, Rich Kids of Instagram. The account was shut down in October 2014, but resurfaced shortly after. The account has shown people drinking alcohol and young women not wearing hijabs, both of which are illegal in Iran.

On 9 January 2020, the account published videos and images which appeared to show the moment Ukraine International Airlines Flight 752 was shot down by a missile, exploding in mid-air. Footage released by the group included a Tor-M1 missile hitting the Boeing 737-800 that then crashed, and an extract of CCTV camera footage showing the moment of impact.

== History ==
In 2014, BBC reported that an Instagram account which shows Tehran's wealthy young elite living like their counterparts in the West had become a sensation in Iran. The article said, "If it wasn't for the Farsi number plates, you'd be forgiven for thinking the account belonged to a rich American living in sun-drenched Los Angeles."

In October 8, 2014, New York Post reported that the Instagram account of Rich Kids of Tehran had raised eyebrows for many, primarily for its inclusions of alcohol and women without hijabs (the traditional headscarf). Some women appear in short skirts, crop tops and even bikinis. Per Iranian law, women must cover their hair with a headscarf and dress modestly in public, though it was unclear if these photos were taken in public or on private property. Alcohol is also forbidden in Iran; however, many elites drink in their own homes. In a post that has since been deleted, the account's creators defended their photos and the idea behind sharing them.

According to New York Post, the Rich Kids of Tehran's Instagram account came just months after the Iranian government cracked down on social media use. In May 2014, eight Iranians received a combined 123 years in jail after insulting President Hassan Rouhani on Facebook. In July 2014, another eight Facebook users were sentenced to a combined 127 years in prison for posting propaganda and insults against Islam and further seven Iranian youths were sentenced to jail time and 91 lashes apiece for posting a video of themselves dancing to Pharrell’s “Happy”.

In an article published by Business Insider in May 2014, it was reported that Instagram's 'Rich Kids Of Tehran' showed the children of Iran's elite flouting sanctions. The article reported that the exhibitions of wealth and sexuality displayed on the page came as a surprise to many both inside and outside Iran, which is subject to strict international sanctions blocking the import of certain luxury goods as well as Islamic laws that prohibit alcohol and immodest dressing.

In November 2014, CNN reported that despite the ban, Rich Kids of Tehran continued. CNN called the page a social media phenomenon that has attracted worldwide attention for offering a startling glimpse at the decadent lifestyle of wealthy young Iranians in one of the world's most socially conservative countries.

In October 2013, The Independent reported young Iranians who flaunt their luxury lifestyles on social media have started a new account to defend their actions after they were forced to shut the original down amid government pressure. Authorities in Iran blocked the “Rich Kids of Tehran” Instagram account on Thursday after flashy images of parties, alcohol and girls wearing bikinis and revealing clothing were featured.

In October 2014, HuffPost published an article stating about the page. The article suggested that the subjects of images on the page appeared to have been photographed in private homes and gardens where such rules cannot be enforced.

In October 2014, The Times published a reported stating a new Instagram account showcasing the lifestyles of wealthy young Iranians has provoked both amusement and anger in Tehran, lifting the lid on a rarely seen side of the Islamic Republic.

In June 2015, Vice News reported that the page had been blocked in Iran such that a VPN was needed to access the page from within Iran.

=== 2018 Iran protests ===
In 2018, Rich Kids of Tehran was blamed for fuelling a series of protests in Iran, which erupted in country-wide demonstrations which brought out crowds both condemning and supporting Iran's government. The demonstrators mobilized against issues including the country's economic woes. Gradually, anti-government protesters across the country turned to the same target: a wealthy elite that has reaped the benefits of a top-down theocratic regime.

=== Ukraine International Airlines Flight 752 ===
On 9 January 2020, the account was the first source to publish videos and images on their Instagram account which appeared to show the moment Ukraine International Airlines Flight 752 was shot down by a missile exploding in mid-air. Footage released by the group included a Tor-M1 missile colliding with the Boeing 737-800 involved in the crash, and an extract of CCTV camera footage showing the moment of impact.

On 14 January 2020, the account published a new video which showed two missiles were being fired by Iran's IRGC. The CCTV footage was verified by The New York Times as showing two missiles fired 30 seconds apart.

On 14 January 2020, CNN reported that according to Tasnim News Agency and Iran's semi-official Fars News Agency, Iranian authorities were also attempting to find the people responsible for the distribution of the videos which appeared to show the moment the aircraft was shot down.

== Criticism ==
RKOT is criticized for making poverty a personal matter and hence depoliticizing it.
