= The Flight (2026 film) =

- Directed by: Soran Mardookhi
- Written by: Soran Mardookhi
- Produced by: Teri Snelgrove; Shirley Vercruysse
- Starring: Hamed Esmaeilion
- Cinematography: Dany Lavoie
- Edited by: Abbas Mojarad
- Production company: National Film Board of Canada
- Release date: October 8, 2026 (VIFF)
- Running time: 97 minutes
- Country: Canada
- Languages: English; Kurdish; Persian

The Flight is a 2026 Canadian documentary film, directed by Soran Mardookhi. The film follows several Iranian Canadian families who have been impacted by the shootdown of Ukraine International Airlines Flight 752 in 2020, and their launch of The Association of Families of Flight PS752 Victims as they pursue justice and accountability.

The film premiered at the 2026 Vancouver International Film Festival.
