= Take Flight =

Take Flight may refer to:

- Take Flight (album), 2005 album of Sylvester Sim
- Take Flight (musical), a musical that premiered in 2007
- Take Flight, a later version of the Walt Disney World attraction Delta Dreamflight
- Take Flight, a song of the album Shatter Me (album) from the American violinist Lindsey Stirling

== See also ==
- Flight (disambiguation)
