= Ukraine International Airlines Flight 752 =

2020 aircraft shootdown over Iran

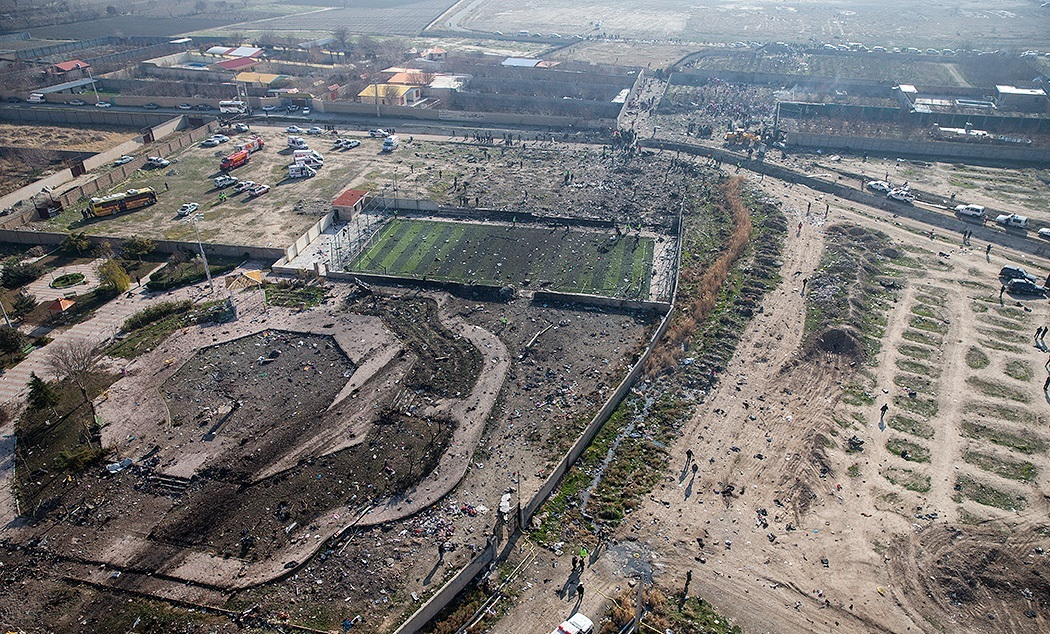
- Aerial view of the crash site

Shootdown
- Date: 8 January 2020
- Summary: Struck by two surface-to-air missiles (Tor M-1) fired by the Islamic Revolutionary Guard Corps
- Site: Shahriar County, near Imam Khomeini International Airport, Tehran, Iran; 35°33′40″N 51°06′14″E

Aircraft
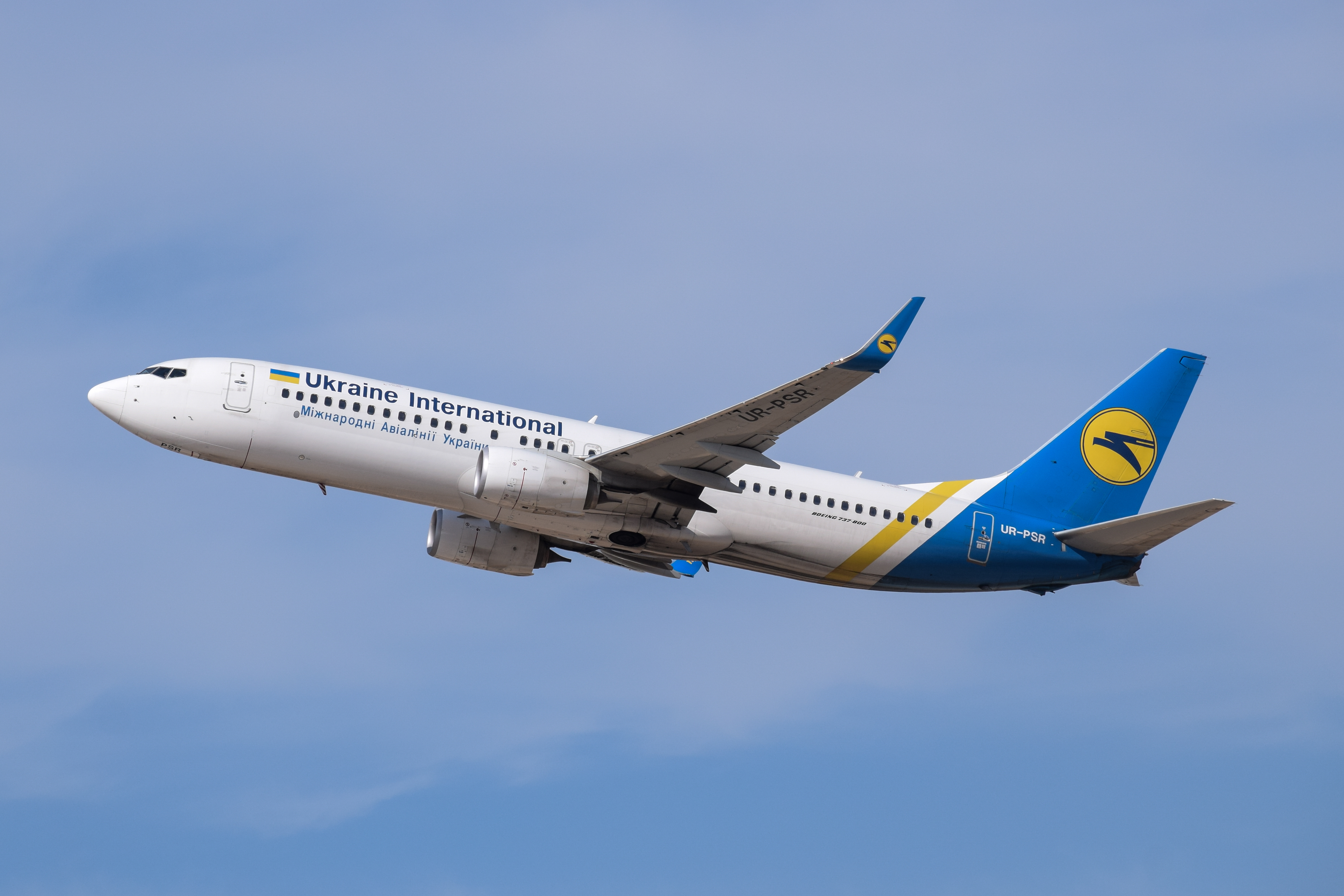
- UR-PSR, the aircraft involved, pictured in 2019
- Aircraft type: Boeing 737-8KV (Note: The aircraft was a Boeing 737-800 model; Boeing assigns a unique code for each company that buys one of its aircraft, which is applied as an infix to the model number at the time the aircraft is built, hence "737-8KV" designates a 737-800 built for Ukraine International Airlines (customer code KV).)
- Operator: Ukraine International Airlines
- IATA flight No.: PS752
- ICAO flight No.: AUI752
- Call sign: UKRAINE INTERNATIONAL 752
- Registration: UR-PSR
- Flight origin: Imam Khomeini International Airport, Tehran, Iran
- Destination: Boryspil International Airport, Kyiv, Ukraine
- Occupants: 176
- Passengers: 167
- Crew: 9
- Fatalities: 176
- Survivors: 0

Ukraine International Airlines Flight 752 was a scheduled international passenger flight from Tehran to Kyiv, operated by Ukraine International Airlines. On 8 January 2020, the Boeing 737-800 flying the route was shot down by the Islamic Revolutionary Guard Corps (IRGC) shortly after takeoff, killing all 176 occupants on board.

Missiles were fired at the aircraft by the IRGC amidst heightened tensions between Iran and the United States. The incident occurred five days after the United States carried out the assassination of Qasem Soleimani and some hours after Iran retaliated with Operation Martyr Soleimani, in which the IRGC fired a dozen ballistic missiles on American forces; both the assassination and the missile strikes took place in Iraq.

Iranian authorities initially denied having any responsibility for the aircraft's destruction, but investigations by various intelligence agencies from the Western world as well as by the Iranian government later revealed that it had been struck by two surface-to-air missiles.

On 11 January 2020, the Government of Iran admitted that the IRGC had shot down the plane, stating that it had "unintentionally" targeted Flight 752 after mistaking it for a cruise missile, and the head of the IRGC apologized for the mistake. The announcement triggered another wave of Iranian anti-government protests (part of the larger 2019–2020 Iranian protests), calling for the removal of Ali Khamenei.

== Background ==
The disaster occurred amid a heightened political crisis in the Persian Gulf, four hours after the Iranian military launched retaliatory ballistic missile strikes towards U.S. military airbases in Iraq in response to the assassination of Major General Qasem Soleimani by the U.S. The U.S. previously threatened Iran and was initially expected to retaliate for the Iranian attack. Iran was on the highest state of defensive alert and, according to Commander of the Aerospace Force of the IRGC Amir Ali Hajizadeh, was "totally prepared for a full-fledged war".

In response to the Iranian missile attack, the U.S. Federal Aviation Administration (FAA), in a notice to airmen (NOTAM), banned all American civil aircraft from flying over Iran, Iraq, the Gulf of Oman and the Persian Gulf. Although the FAA NOTAMs are not binding on non-U.S. airlines, many airlines take them into consideration when making safety decisions, especially after the downing of Malaysia Airlines Flight 17 in 2014. Several airlines, including Austrian Airlines, Singapore Airlines, KLM, Air France, Air India, SriLankan Airlines, Qantas and Vietnam Airlines began to reroute their flights. Other airlines, such as Lufthansa, Emirates, Flydubai, and Turkish Airlines cancelled some flights to airports in Iran and Iraq, making further operational changes as necessary.

== Aircraft ==
The aircraft was a Boeing 737-8KV, (Note: The aircraft was a Boeing 737-800 model; at the time the aircraft was built, Boeing assigned a unique code for each company that bought one of its aircraft, which was applied as a suffix to the model number at the time the aircraft was built. Ukrainian International Airlines' code was "KV", hence "737-8KV" (see List of Boeing customer codes).) serial number 38124, registration UR-PSR. It was three-and-a-half years old when it was shot down, having first flown on 21 June 2016. It was delivered to UIA on 19 July 2016, the first 737 Next Generation aircraft purchased by the airline. The aircraft was well maintained, with the airline saying it had been inspected just two days before the crash.

== Flight and crash ==
Ukraine International Airlines Flight 752 flight path Detailed map

Speed and altitude of Ukraine International Airlines Flight 752

The flight was operated by Ukraine International Airlines, flag carrier and largest airline of Ukraine, on a scheduled flight from the Iranian capital Tehran's Imam Khomeini International Airport to Boryspil International Airport in the Ukrainian capital, Kyiv. The aircraft was carrying 176 people, including 9 crew members and 15 children. Flight 752 took off from Runway 29R an hour behind schedule, at 06:12:08 local time (UTC+3:30), and was expected to land in Kyiv at 08:00 local time (UTC+2:00). Between 06:14:17 and 06:14:45 the airplane turned from the take-off heading of 289° to heading 313°, following its regular route.

According to the data, the last recorded altitude of the aircraft was 2,416 metres (7,925 ft) above mean sea level with a ground speed of 275 knots (509 km/h; 316 mph). The airport is 1,007 metres (3,305 ft) above mean sea level and the terrain around Parand and the crash site lies approximately 125 metres (410 ft) higher at 1,134 metres (3,720 ft). The flight was climbing at just under 15 metres per second (3,000 ft/min) when the flight data recorder abruptly ended over the open ground near the northern end of Enqelab Eslami Boulevard in Parand.

Analysis of several videos by The New York Times showed that the aircraft was hit almost immediately after departure by the first of two short-range missiles (which knocked out its transponder) launched 30 seconds apart by the IRGC, and with the aircraft having maintained its track, by the second missile 23 seconds later, after which it veered right and could be seen on fire before disappearing from view. Ukrainian investigators believed the pilots were killed instantly by shrapnel from the missile which exploded near the cockpit. However, an analysis of the cockpit voice recorder indicated that for at least 19 seconds after the first missile strike, all three cockpit crew members continued to attempt to fly the aircraft, and there was no indication of injury or adverse health effects during that time.

The final ADS-B data received was at 06:14:57, less than three minutes after departure, after which the aircraft's track was recorded by primary radar only. Its last seconds were captured in several video recordings. The aircraft crashed in a park and fields on the edge of the village of Khalajabad, 15 kilometres (9.3 mi; 8.1 nmi) north-west of the airport, and about 16 kilometres (10 mi) east-northeast of the last missile strike, about six minutes after takeoff.

Shortly after the crash, emergency responders arrived in 22 ambulances, 4 bus ambulances, and a helicopter, but intense fires prevented a rescue attempt. The wreckage was strewn over a wide area, with no survivors found at the crash site. The aircraft was completely destroyed on impact. All 176 passengers and crew were killed. It was the deadliest aviation occurrence in terms of fatalities involving the Boeing 737 Next Generation fleet until Jeju Air Flight 2216 crashed in Muan nearly five years later. It is currently the third deadliest aviation incident or accident to involve a Boeing 737, behind Lion Air Flight 610 (a Boeing 737 MAX 8) and the aforementioned Jeju Air Flight 2216.

== Passengers and crew ==
People on board, based on Ukrainian official list (Note: The list is based on Ukrainian sources, with notes indicating confirmed deviations.)
Nation	People
Iran (Note: According to Iranian officials, 146 passengers used an Iranian passport to leave Iran; some victims from Canada were Canadian-Iranian citizens.)	82
Canada (Note: Canadian Foreign Affairs Minister said "the number of Canadian citizens believed to have been aboard the airplane is 57—not 63 as initially provided by Ukrainian authorities." There is no corresponding source about the six people said not to be Canadian, so the table cannot be changed, as the total would not add up.)	63
Ukraine (Note: Two passengers and nine crew members)	11
Sweden (Note: According to the Swedish Minister for Foreign Affairs, seven Swedish citizens died on the flight. Some sources, however, mention a total of 17 Swedish passengers, including ten who were living in Sweden and seven who held Swedish passport.)	10
Afghanistan (Note: The manifest initially released by UIA listed three Germans. These were subsequently identified as Afghans living in Germany as asylum seekers. The Afghan Ministry of Foreign Affairs said 13 Afghan nationals boarded the flight, including six who held dual Afghan-Swedish citizenship.)	7
United Kingdom (Note: On 10 January, UK Prime Minister Boris Johnson confirmed four Britons died on the flight. It is unknown at present which country's passport the fourth Briton presented.)	3
Total	176

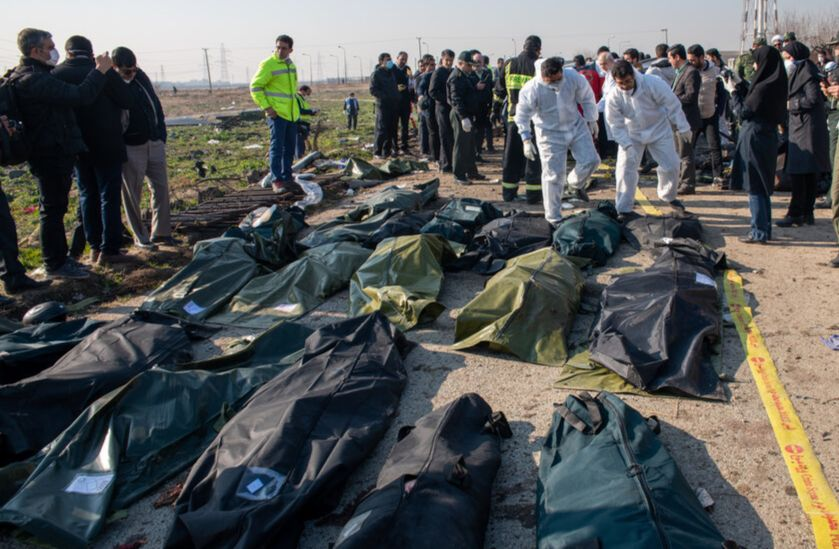
Recovery operations, victims of Flight 752

There were 167 passengers and 9 crew members on the flight. According to Iranian officials, 146 passengers used Iranian passports to leave Iran, 10 used Afghan passports, 5 used Canadian ones, 4 used Swedish ones, and 2 used Ukrainian passports.

According to Ukrainian foreign minister Vadym Prystaiko and a flight manifest released by UIA, of the 167 passengers, 82 were confirmed to be Iranian citizens, 63 were Canadian, 3 were British, 4 were Afghan, 10 were Swedish, and 3 were German. 11 Ukrainians were also on board, 9 of them being crew members. The German Foreign Ministry denied any Germans were aboard; the three people in question were Afghan nationals who lived in Germany as asylum seekers. According to Iranian nationality law, the Iranian government considers dual citizens to be solely Iranian citizens.

Of the 167 passengers, 138 were travelling to Canada via Ukraine. Many of the Iranian Canadians were affiliated with Canadian universities, as students or academics who had travelled to Iran during the winter break. The crash was the largest loss of Canadian lives in aviation since the 1985 bombing of Air India Flight 182. On 15 January 2020, Canadian Transport Minister Marc Garneau said 57 Canadians died in the crash.

In addition to six flight attendants, the crew consisted of 50 year old captain Volodymyr Gaponenko (11,600 hours on Boeing 737 aircraft, including 5,500 hours as captain), 42 year old instructor pilot Oleksiy Naumkin (12,000 hours on Boeing 737s, including 6,600 as captain), and 48 year old first officer Serhiy Khomenko (7,600 hours on Boeing 737).

== Investigation ==
The Civil Aviation Organization of Iran (CAOI) reported shortly after the incident that a team of investigators had been sent to the crash site. President Volodymyr Zelenskyy instructed the Ukrainian General Prosecutor to open a criminal investigation into the crash. The Ukrainian government sent 45 investigators to assist with the inquiry into the shootdown of the airliner.

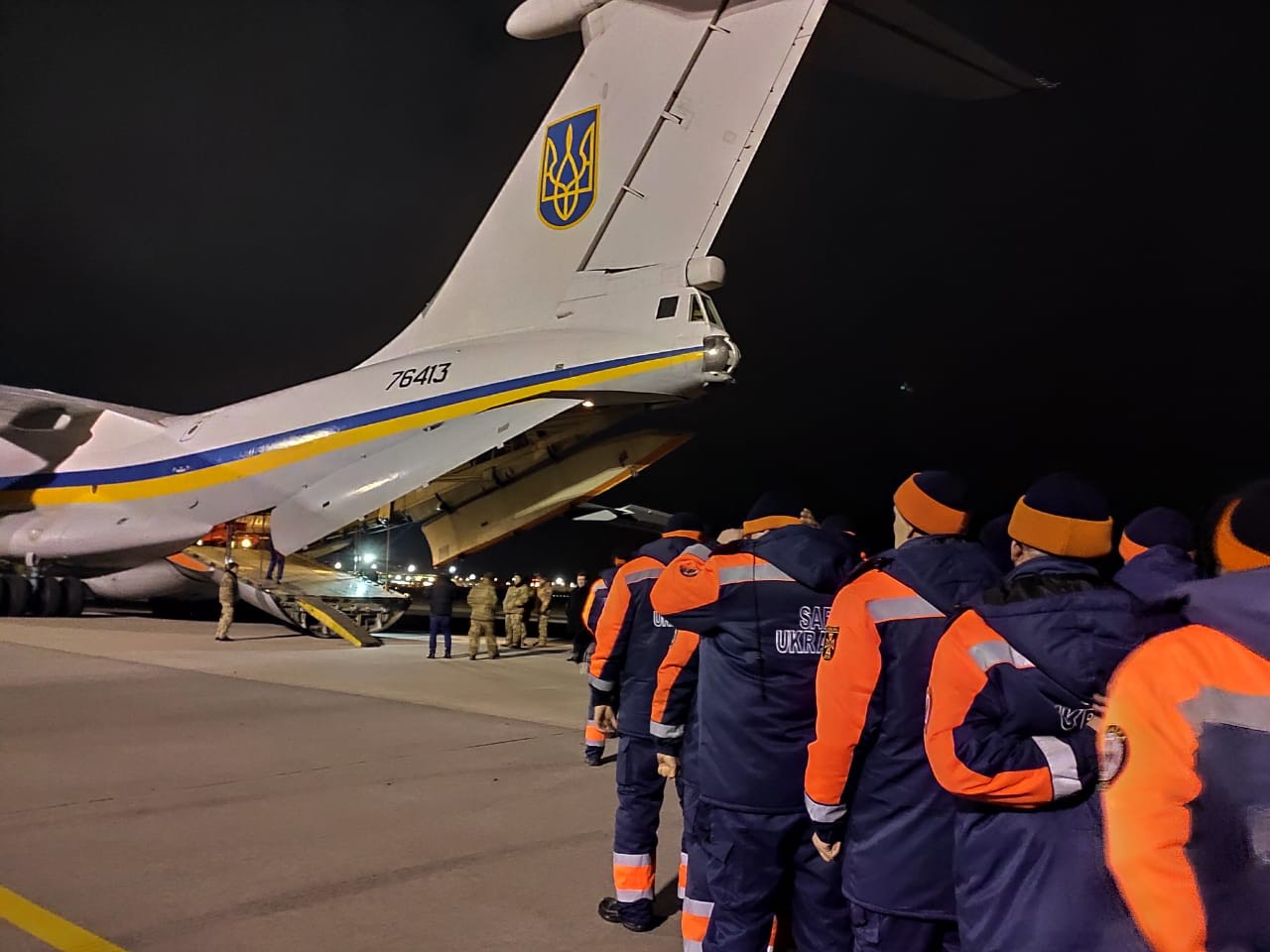
A Ukrainian Air Force Ilyushin Il-76 prepares to depart for Iran from Boryspil International Airport with specialists from the National Bureau of Investigation of Civil Aviation and Incidents with the Civil Aviation Service, State Aviation Service, Ukraine International Airlines and from the General Inspectorate of the Ministry of Defense of Ukraine.

Under standard International Civil Aviation Organization (ICAO) rules, according to Annex 13 of the Chicago Convention, the United States National Transportation Safety Board (NTSB) would participate in the investigation, as they represented the state of the manufacturer of the aircraft. France's Bureau of Enquiry and Analysis for Civil Aviation Safety (BEA) would participate as representatives of the state of manufacture of the aircraft's engines (a U.S.–France joint venture) and Ukraine's Ministry of Infrastructure would participate as representatives of the state in which the aircraft was registered. Given that there were tensions between these nations and Iran as part of the 2019–2021 Persian Gulf crisis, it was not known how these investigative organizations would be involved, although it was reported that Iran had said American, French and Ukrainian authorities would be involved.

The head of the commission for accidents in the CAOI said they received no emergency message from the aircraft before the crash. It was reported that the aircraft's black boxes (the cockpit voice recorder [CVR] and flight data recorder [FDR]) had been recovered, but the CAOI said it was not clear to which country the recorders would be sent so the data could be analyzed. The association said it would not hand over the black boxes to Boeing or to U.S. authorities. On 9 January, the black boxes were reported, by Iranian investigators, to have been damaged and that some parts of their memory may have been lost. Mary Schiavo, a former U.S. Department of Transportation inspector general, said no automated distress messages had been sent from the aircraft or by its crew.

On 9 January, the Swedish Accident Investigation Authority and Transportation Safety Board of Canada (TSB) were officially invited by the investigation team to participate in the probe on the crash. The NTSB, Ukraine, and Boeing were also invited to participate in the investigation. Due to American economic sanctions placed on Iran, U.S. investigators would need a special licence from the Treasury and the State Departments to travel there.

On 9 January, media reports showed bulldozers being used to clear the crash site. Some aircraft investigation experts expressed concerns about disturbing and damaging the crash site before a thorough investigation could be conducted. Iran denied bulldozing the evidence. On 10 January, the Iranian government granted Ukrainian investigators permission to investigate the flight recorders and Ukrainian investigators visited the crash site, with plans to download the recorders in Tehran. On 14 January, the head of the TSB, Kathy Fox, said there were signs that Iran would allow the TSB to participate in the downloading and analysis of data from the airplane's flight data recorder and cockpit voice recorder. On 23 January, the TSB announced that they had been invited by Iran to help with the flight recorders.

On 2 February, Ukrainian public TV aired a leaked recording of the information exchange between the Iranian pilot of an Aseman Airlines flight and an Iranian air traffic controller. The pilot stated in Persian that he saw "a series of flares like that of a missile" and later an explosion. Following the leak, Zelenskyy said the new evidence proved Iran was well aware from the very first moments that the Ukraine passenger airplane was brought down by a missile. The following day Iran ceased co-operation with Ukraine in its investigation into the disaster. Iran resumed co-operation on 15 February. In the final report about the crash, Iranian authorities gave a more complete transcript of the communication.

=== Flight data recorder and cockpit voice recorder ===
On 20 January, Iran asked for assistance from France and the United States to recover the data from the flight data recorder and cockpit voice recorder. On 5 February, Canada urged Iran to send the recorders to France. Iran denied the request. On 12 March, Iran agreed to hand over the recorders to Ukraine. However, the COVID-19 pandemic delayed this action. During this time, impatience began to mount from Ukraine, Canada, and ICAO.

On 11 June, Iran announced that the flight recorders would be sent directly to the Bureau of Enquiry and Analysis for Civil Aviation Safety (BEA) in France. Canadian officials urged Iran to complete this action "as soon as possible", citing the previous delays in handing over the recorders. This statement was further reinforced 11 days later, when Iranian foreign minister Mohammad Javad Zarif commented on this intention during a phone call with Canadian foreign minister François-Philippe Champagne. On 20 July, the examination of the recorders started in Paris.

=== Cause of the crash ===
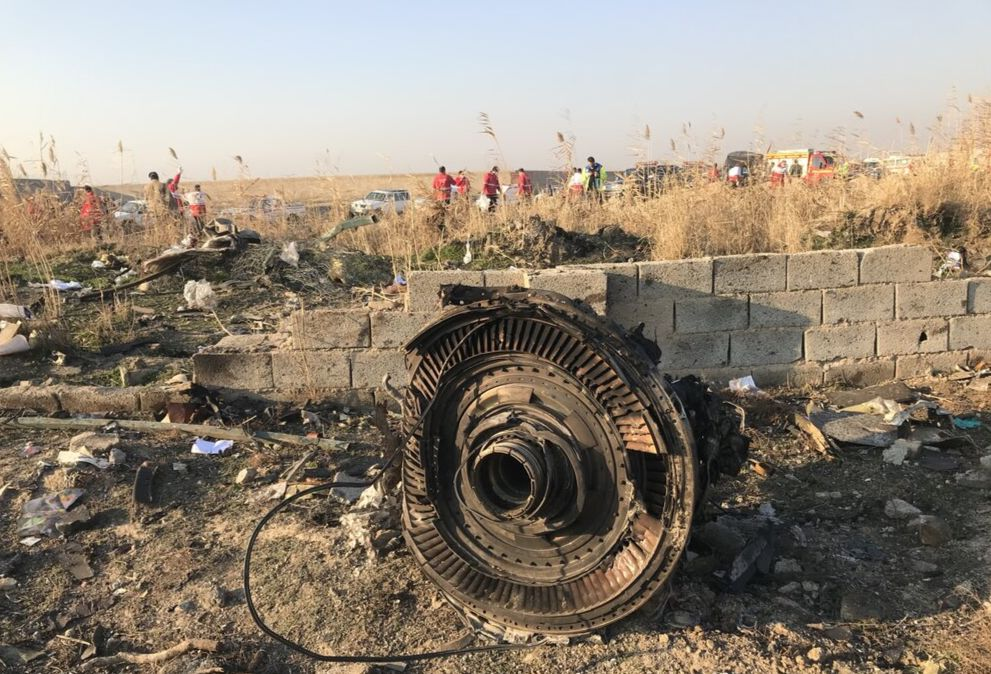
Wreckage of Flight 752, with part of an engine in the foreground, showing nozzle guide vanes

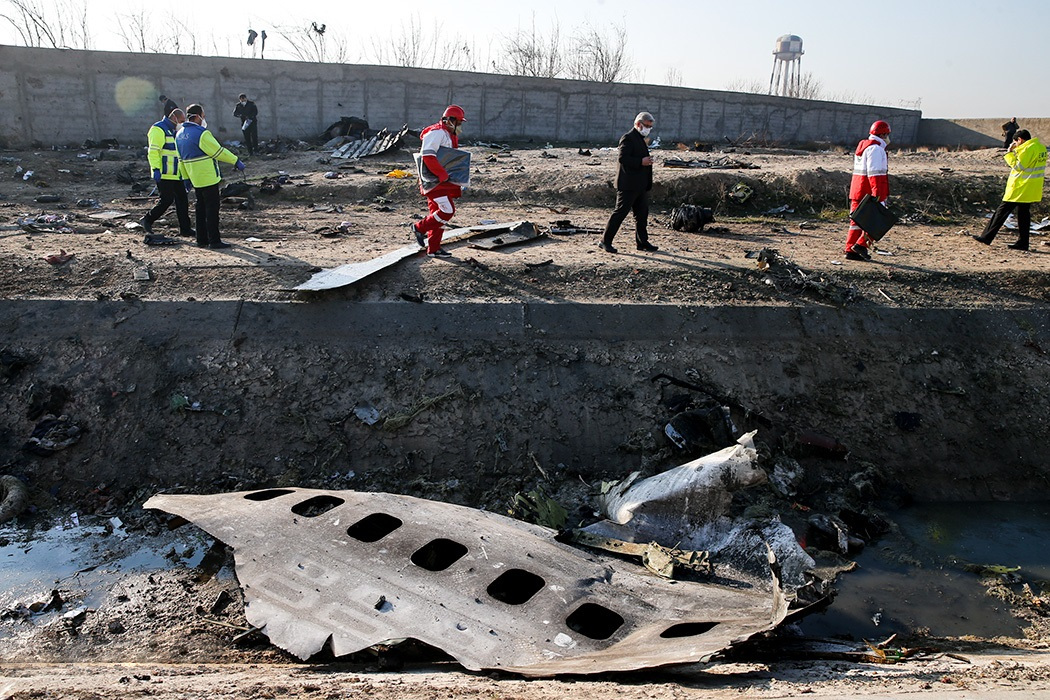
Wreckage of Flight 752

On 8 January, Iran's Road and Transportation Ministry released a statement that the aircraft burst into flames after a fire started in one of its engines, causing the pilot to lose control and crash into the ground. The airline opined that pilot error was impossible to be cited as the cause of the crash as the pilots had exclusively been trained for the Tehran flights for years, noting that Tehran Airport was "not a simple airport".

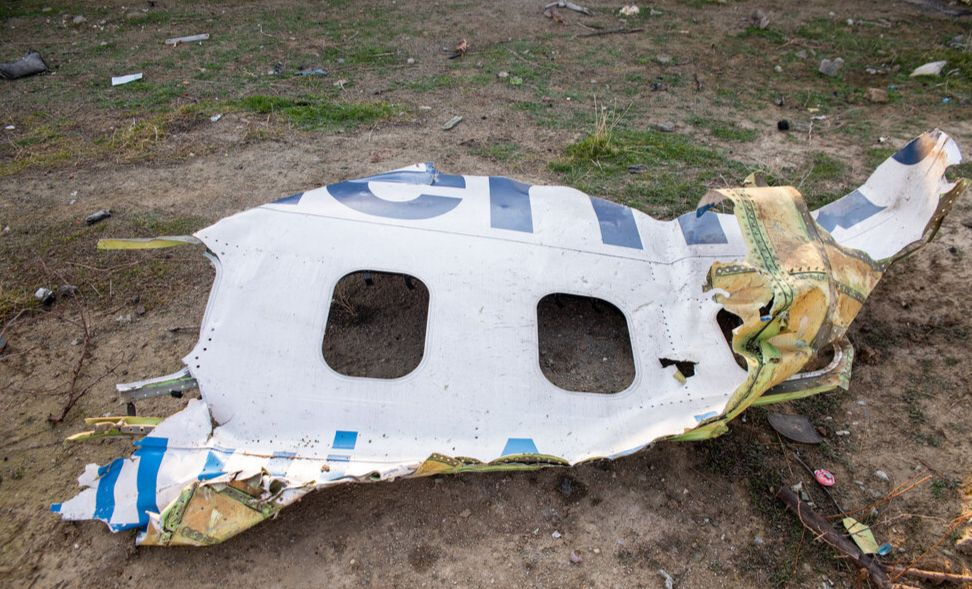
The skin of the livery of the aircraft

Iranian and Ukrainian government sources initially blamed mechanical issues aboard the aircraft for its crash. The Ukrainian government later retracted its statement and said anything was possible, refusing to rule out that the aircraft was hit by a missile. Zelenskyy said there should not be any speculation about the cause of the crash.

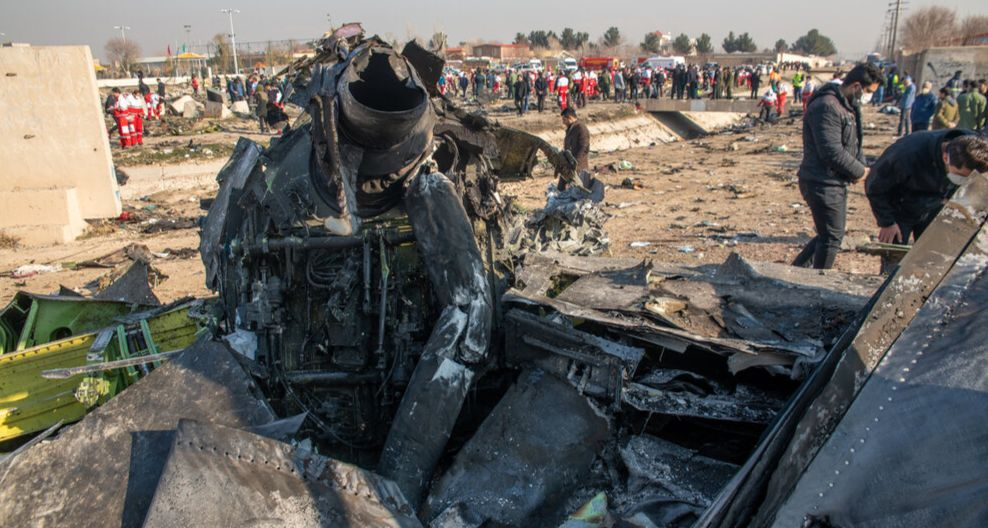
Another view of the wreckage

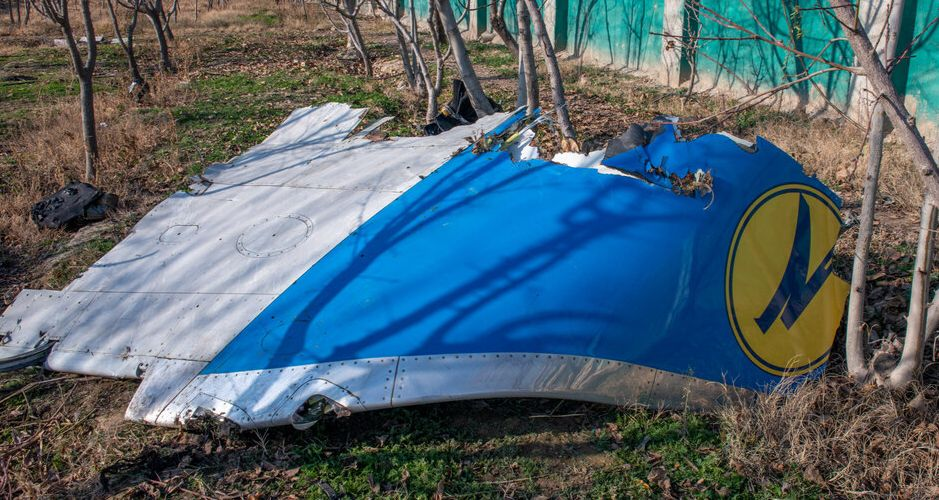
The wing tip of UIA Flight 752

On 9 January, U.S. intelligence and defence officials said they believed the aircraft had been shot down by an Iranian Tor missile (NATO reporting name SA-15 "Gauntlet"), based on evidence from reconnaissance satellite imagery and radar data. Ukrainian authorities said a shootdown was one of the "main working theories", while Iranian authorities denied this, stating that allegations of a missile hit were "psychological warfare". British defence officials agreed with the American assessment of a shootdown. Prime Minister of Canada Justin Trudeau said evidence from multiple sources, including Canadian intelligence, suggested the aircraft was shot down by an Iranian missile. He added that "this may well have been unintentional". Iranian media described it as "an American lie", "a wrongful scenario by CIA and the Pentagon", and "an attempt to prevent Boeing stock from a free fall".

On 11 January, the Armed Forces of the Islamic Republic of Iran admitted they had shot down the airplane, having erroneously identified it as a hostile target. According to an early IRGC statement, when the airplane seemed to head toward a "sensitive military centre" of the IRGC, controllers mistook it for a "hostile target" and shot it down. Iran's Civil Aviation Organization disputed this timeline, arguing that the airplane was on the correct course all the time and there was no proven flight deviation. The CAOI's viewpoint was also supported by a Radio Canada International article that used public ADS-B flight tracking data. Iranian Brigadier general Amir Ali Hajizadeh of the IRGC Aerospace Defense said a missile operator in Bidganeh had acted independently, mistook the airplane for a U.S. cruise missile and shot it down. Hajizadeh also said the airplane was on-track and "made no mistake".

Western experts had previously noted that Flight 752 was flying near several sensitive Iranian ballistic missile facilities, including the Shahid Modarres missile base at Bidganeh near Malard, which the Iranians could have believed would be targets of retaliation for their attack a few hours earlier. The flight had been delayed by more than an hour because the captain had decided to offload some luggage as the aircraft was over its certified takeoff weight.

On 11 July 2020, the CAOI reported that Iran now blamed the missile strike that downed PS752 on "bad communication" and "poor alignment". According to the Iranians, the missile battery "had been relocated and was not properly reoriented" and the guilty parties did not include the higher-ranking chain of command officers. On 20 July, Canadian foreign minister François-Philippe Champagne rejected the finding by the CAOI that "human error" caused the launch of the missiles which destroyed the aircraft: "It cannot just be the result of a human error. There is no circumstance under (which) a civilian aircraft can be downed just by the result of human error in this day and age... All the facts and circumstances point to more than just a human error, so certainly we will continue to pursue vigorously the investigation."

=== Analyses based on social media ===
On 9 January, the Instagram account Rich Kids of Tehran published a video captioned: "The actual footage from the moment the #Ukrainian flight was shot down by a Russian-made Tor-M1 missile just moments after takeoff from #Tehran's Airport". The video was published at the same time the Iranian authorities were claiming technical problems for the crash. Qassem Biniaz, a spokesman for Iran's Road and Transportation Ministry, said the pilot "lost control of the plane" after a fire broke out in one of its engines, denying the Ukrainian plane was hit by a missile.

On 9 January, a video was posted on a public Telegram channel showing what was, according to Bellingcat, apparently a mid-air explosion. The New York Times contacted the person who filmed the video and confirmed its authenticity. An investigation team from Bellingcat carried out an analysis of this video and geolocated it to a residential area in Parand, a suburb west of the airport. Bellingcat also examined photos from an unknown source and said these images of a missile nose cone had yet to be verified, despite claims from several sources. The Tor missile's warhead is located in its midsection, meaning its nose may not be destroyed in an explosion. Similar photographs of fragments have been taken in eastern Ukraine, but none have been found to be the same as those attributed to the recent incident.

USA Today reported that the firm IHS Markit reviewed photographs showing the guidance section of a missile and "assesses them to be credible". Aviation monitoring group Opsgroup said: "We would recommend the starting assumption to be that this was a shootdown event, similar to MH17—until there is clear evidence to the contrary" asserting that photographs "show obvious projectile holes in the fuselage and a wing section".

=== Subsequent developments ===
On 9 January, US President Donald Trump said the airplane "was flying in a pretty rough neighbourhood, and somebody could have made a mistake on the other side." He said the U.S. had no involvement in the incident and that he did not believe a mechanical issue had anything to do with the crash. U.S. intelligence sources informed U.S. media outlets they were "confident that Iran painted the Ukrainian airliner with radar and fired two surface to air missiles that brought down the aircraft."

Also on 9 January, at a news conference in Ottawa, Canadian Prime Minister Justin Trudeau said the airliner was likely brought down by an Iranian missile, citing intelligence from Canadian and other sources, and said the incident "may well have been unintentional". On 10 January, during an interview with Sky News, Iran's ambassador to the United Kingdom, Hamid Baeidinejad, rejected video footage obtained by American media that showed bulldozers clearing the crash site as "absurd". Baeidinejad further denied that an Iranian missile had brought down the airplane, and said that "[p]lane accidents are a very technical issue, I cannot judge, you cannot judge, reporters on the ground cannot judge. Nobody can judge. A foreign minister or a prime minister cannot judge on this issue."

On 11 January, Iran admitted it had shot down the Ukrainian jet by "accident", the result of human error. General Amir Ali Hajizadeh, the head of the IRGC's Aerospace Force, said his unit accepts "full responsibility" for the shootdown. In an address broadcast by state television, he said that when he learned about the downing of the airplane, "I wished I was dead." Hajizadeh said that, with his forces on high alert, an officer mistook it for a hostile missile and made a "bad decision". On 14 January, the Rich Kids of Tehran Instagram account published a new video, showing two missiles hitting the aircraft. The security camera footage, verified by The New York Times, shows two missiles, fired 30 seconds apart. On 20 January, the Civil Aviation Organization of Iran also admitted that the country's IRGC had fired two Russian-made Tor-M1 missiles at the aircraft. On 8 January 2021, the first anniversary of the shootdown, Ukraine and several other countries made a joint statement calling on Iran for a thorough investigation and reiterated for them to prosecute anyone involved, and provide full compensation.

=== Final report ===
On 17 March 2021, CAOI released the final report on the crash, which states the following:

The air defense's launching two surface-to-air missiles at the flight PS752, UR-PSR aircraft, the detonation of the first missile warhead in proximity of the aircraft caused damage to the aircraft systems, and the intensification of damage led the aircraft to crash into the ground and explode instantly.

A contributing factor was:

The mitigating measures and defense layers in risk management proved to be ineffective due to the occurrence of an unanticipated error in threat identifications, and ultimately failed to protect the flight safety against the threats caused by the alertness of defense forces.

Ukraine's Minister of Foreign Affairs Dmytro Kuleba rejected the findings and criticized the report as "a collection of manipulations, the goal of which is not to establish the truth, but to whitewash the Islamic Republic of Iran". The Transportation Safety Board of Canada also criticized the report, saying that it did not provide an exact reason to why the IRGC fired its missiles at Flight 752.

== Legal ==
On 10 August 2020, IRGC officer Gholamreza Soleimani, commander of Basij forces, said that Iran would not compensate Ukraine International Airlines for the shootdown because the "plane is insured by European companies in Ukraine and not by Iranian companies". Earlier in February 2020, a proposed class action claim was filed in the Ontario Superior Court of Justice against Iran, Iranian Supreme Leader Ali Khamenei, and various branches of the Iranian military, among others. Lawyers of the families of Canadian victims were seeking compensation of at least CA$1.1 billion. In April 2020, families of the victims formed The Association of Families of Flight PS752 Victims in Toronto, Ontario, Canada, to follow the case through legal avenues. The association's president and spokesman, Hamed Esmaeilion, said the association's aim is, "to bring the perpetrators of the crime to justice, including those who ordered it". In July 2020, Esmaeilion was outraged that the ICAO had yet to condemn the incident, and pointed out that the ICAO needed only three months to adopt a unanimous resolution condemning in the strongest terms the destruction and alleged murders of Malaysia Airlines Flight MH17.

On 30 December 2020, Iran unilaterally announced that it had allocated $150,000 for each victim's family. Ukraine was critical, stating that the compensation should be set through talks after establishing the causes of the crash, and that "the Ukrainian side expects from Iran a draft technical report on the circumstances of the aircraft shooting down". On 20 May 2021, Justice Belobaba of the Ontario Superior Court of Justice released a decision finding that "The shooting down of Flight 752 by the defendants (Islamic Republic of Iran) was an act of terrorism and constitutes "terrorist activity" under the SIA (State Immunity Act), the JVTA (Justice For Victims of Terrorism Act) and the provisions of the Criminal Code." The defendants were not represented or in attendance in court and the case resulted in a default judgment. Iran's foreign ministry denounced the court's verdict as political, stating: "This verdict has no basis and does not consist of any objective reasoning or documentation ... This behaviour of the Canadian judge, by following orders and political cliches, is shameful for a country which claims to follow the rule of law." Leah West, an assistant professor at the Norman Paterson School of International Affairs at Carleton University said that the "judge contorted the law by cherry-picking his way to finding the aircraft was destroyed in an act of terrorism." She concluded "While his motivations for doing all that may be noble, that's dangerous for the rule of law". The lawyer for the plaintiffs indicated that, depending on the amounts awarded, he would move to have Iranian assets in Canada or internationally seized, including oil tankers. As of 3 January 2022, the Ontario Superior Court has awarded more than C$107M to families of six victims after ruling the shootdown was "an intentional act of terrorism". It is unclear how any of the plaintiffs will collect their settlements from the government of Iran and legal experts have indicated that a diplomatic solution for compensation may be the only realistic route available, since Iran views the court ruling as illegitimate.

On 8 January 2022, Deputy Prosecutor General Gyunduz Mamedov stated that the names of some of the attackers had already been identified. In particular, it is necessary to check for involvement in the commission of the crime lower-level servicemen of the Islamic Revolutionary Guard Corps (IRGC), including Captain Mehdi Khosravi, commander of the M-1 TOR, First Lieutenant Meysam Kheirollahi, operator, Third Lieutenant Seyed Ahmad Miri, First Lieutenant Mohammad Majid Eslam Doost, Captain Sajjad Mohammadi, Major Hamed Mabhout, Second Brigadier General Ibrahim Safaei Kia, Brigadier General Ali Akbar Seydoun and Iranian Army Colonel Mostafa Farati, who are charged with negligence, recklessness and improper performance of duty and other related offences.

In July 2022, UIA announced it would sue Iran and the IRGC for $1 billion over the incident. They are seeking damages for the loss of life and baggage of passengers and crew as well as derivative claims of surviving family members. In 2023 the ICJ (International Court of Justice) said that "Canada and three allies filed proceedings against Iran". Ukraine, Sweden, Canada and Britain stated that Iran did not "conduct an impartial, transparent and fair criminal investigation" but rather "withheld or destroyed evidence" and threatened families of victims. On 5 July 2023, the four affected countries of Canada, Ukraine, the United Kingdom and Sweden referred the case of the downing of flight PS752 to the International Court of Justice. The Association of Families of Flight PS752 Victims independently filed a claim before the ICJ in support of the four affected countries' referral. On 10 June 2024, Ontario's Superior Court of Justice rules UIA was negligent in allowing Flight PS752 to take off from Tehran on January 8, 2020, so UIA could not limit compensation under the Montreal Convention and must fully compensate the families. On 11 August 2025, the Ontario Court of Appeal has upheld the 10 June 2024 ruling, confirming UIA’s liability to compensate families.

== Reactions ==
=== Air traffic ===
Ukraine International Airlines (UIA) suspended flights to Tehran indefinitely shortly after the incident, with flights after the day of the crash no longer available. The suspension also complied with a prohibition issued by State Aviation Administration of Ukraine for flights in Iran's airspace for all Ukrainian registered aircraft. Since the crash, additional airlines, Air Astana and SCAT Airlines also re-routed flights that overflew Iran. This followed a recommendation by the Kazakhstan Ministry of Industry and Infrastructure Development, issued to Kazakhstani air companies after the crash, to avoid flying over Iran airspace and/or to cancel flights to Iran. Also, Air Canada rerouted its Toronto-Dubai flight to fly over Egypt and Saudi Arabia instead of Iraq, as a precaution.

=== Iran ===
==== Government and IRGC ====
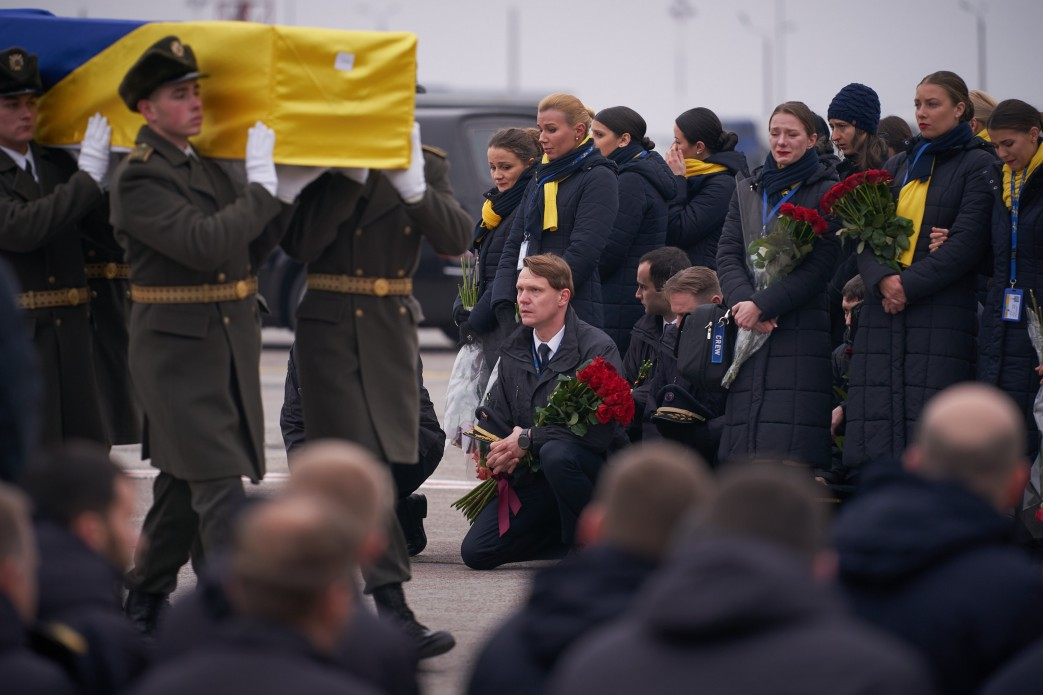
Commemoration of the victims of the air crash in Iran

Iran declared 9 January a national day of mourning both for the victims of Flight 752 and for those killed in a stampede at Qasem Soleimani's funeral. On 11 January, the Iranian IRGC said they had shot down the aircraft after erroneously identifying it as a hostile target. President Hassan Rouhani called the incident an "unforgivable mistake". Foreign minister Mohammad Javad Zarif apologized for the disaster and added that the preliminary conclusion of the armed forces' internal investigation was "human error". On 13 January, the head of the IRGC apologized, stating “Never in my life have I felt so ashamed."

On 17 January, Iranian Supreme Leader Ali Khamenei, in his first Friday sermon in eight years, referred to the incident as a bitter accident. His sermon came as public anger mounted against the government for their handling of the incident. In April, an Iranian MP, the spokesman for the Iranian parliament's legal and judicial committee, said the Iranian military "carried out their duties well", adding that "the movement of the plane was very suspicious" and that no arrests had been made in relation to the incident.

==== Anti-government protests ====
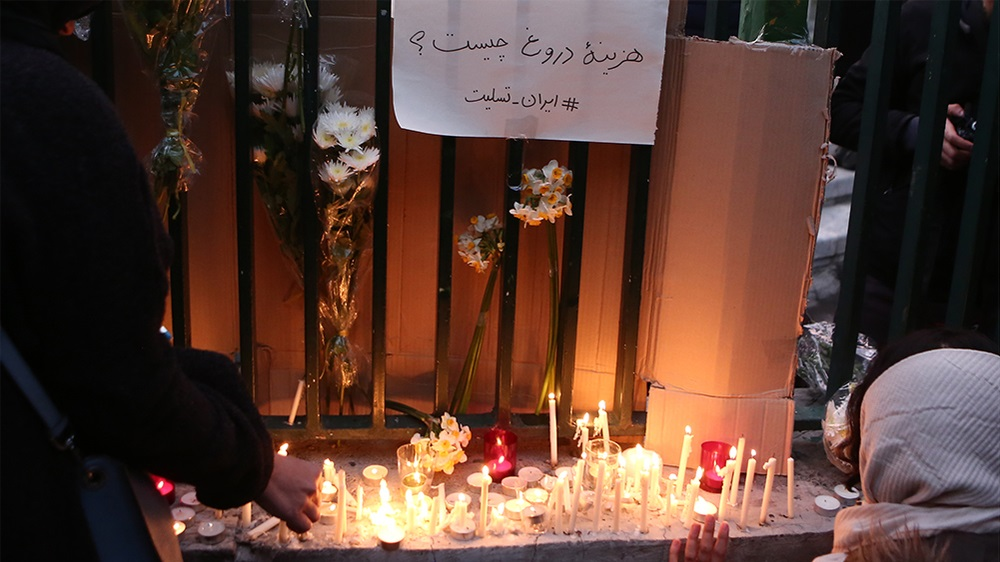
A gathering at Amirkabir University of Technology. Above flowers and lit candles a notice reads "What is the cost of lying?"

On 11 January, in response to the government's admission, thousands of protesters poured into the streets of Tehran and other Iranian cities such as Isfahan, Shiraz, Hamadan and Urmia. Video clips on Twitter showed protesters in Tehran chanting "Death to the dictator", a reference to Supreme Leader Ali Khamenei. In Tehran, hundreds of protesters took to the streets to vent anger at officials, calling them liars for having denied the shootdown. Protests took place outside at least two universities: students and protesters gathered at Sharif University, Amirkabir University and Hafez Overpass in Tehran, initially to pay respect to the victims. Protests turned angry in the evening. President Trump tweeted support for the protests. The mourning Iranians called Qasem Soleimani a murderer and tore up pictures of him, shattering the appearance of national solidarity that had followed his death.

On 12 January, in Tehran and in several other cities protesters chanted slogans against the leadership and clashed with security forces and Iran's Basiji Force firing tear gas at the protesters. The protesters chanted that they needed more than just resignations, but prosecutions of those responsible as well. Tehran residents told Reuters that police were out in force in the capital on 12 January, with dozens of protesters in Tehran chanting "They are lying that our enemy is America, our enemy is right here", and scores of demonstrators gathered in other cities.

Amnesty International reported that on 11 and 12 January Iranian security forces used tear gas, pointed pellets and pepper spray against peaceful demonstrators. On 13 January, the Los Angeles Times reported that Iranian security forces fired both live ammunition and tear gas to disperse demonstrators. Iran's exiled Crown Prince Reza Pahlavi said the Supreme Leader Ali Khamenei was responsible for the downing. Iranian reformist newspaper Etemad ran the banner headline "Apologize and resign", and commented on the "people's demand" for the removal of those responsible for the shootdown. A Khamenei representative in the elite Revolutionary Guards told a gathering of Khamenei's representatives in Iranian universities that the Assembly of Experts, the clerical body that chose Khamenei, "... do not appoint the Supreme Leader, rather they discover him and it is not that they would be able to remove him any time they wish so. In the Islamic system, the office and the legitimacy of the Supreme Leader comes from God, the Prophet and the Shi'ite Imams".

==== Funerals ====
Iran's Radio Farda reported that according to Zeytoun (a Persian website based outside of Iran), Iranian intelligence agents forced families of the victims to give interviews on state TV, declaring their support for the Iranian government or else the government would not deliver the bodies of the victims. Iran's security forces were on alert not to let people turn funerals of the plane crash victims into demonstrations. Nevertheless, in some Iranian cities such as Isfahan and Sanandaj, participants in these funerals have shown their anger and shouted anti-government slogans. The supreme leader Ali Khamenei praised the country's armed forces and described the protesters as those deceived by foreign media.

==== Arrests ====
On 14 January 2020, Iran's judiciary announced that several arrests had been made over "the accidental shooting down of the aircraft". The spokesman, Gholamhossein Esmaili, did not name any suspect or say how many had been held. In a televised speech, President Rouhani said the judiciary would assemble a special court with a high-ranking judge and tens of experts to oversee the investigation. The same day, it was announced that Iranian authorities had arrested the person who had published a video of the aircraft being shot down. An Iranian journalist based in London who initially posted the footage insisted his source was safe and that the Iranian authorities had arrested the wrong person. According to Tasnim News Agency and the semi-official Fars News Agency, Iranian authorities were looking for the person(s) who distributed the video. On 6 April 2021, Iran indicted 10 officials over the shooting down of the aircraft. The outgoing military prosecutor for Tehran province said that "necessary decisions will be taken in court."

=== Ukraine ===
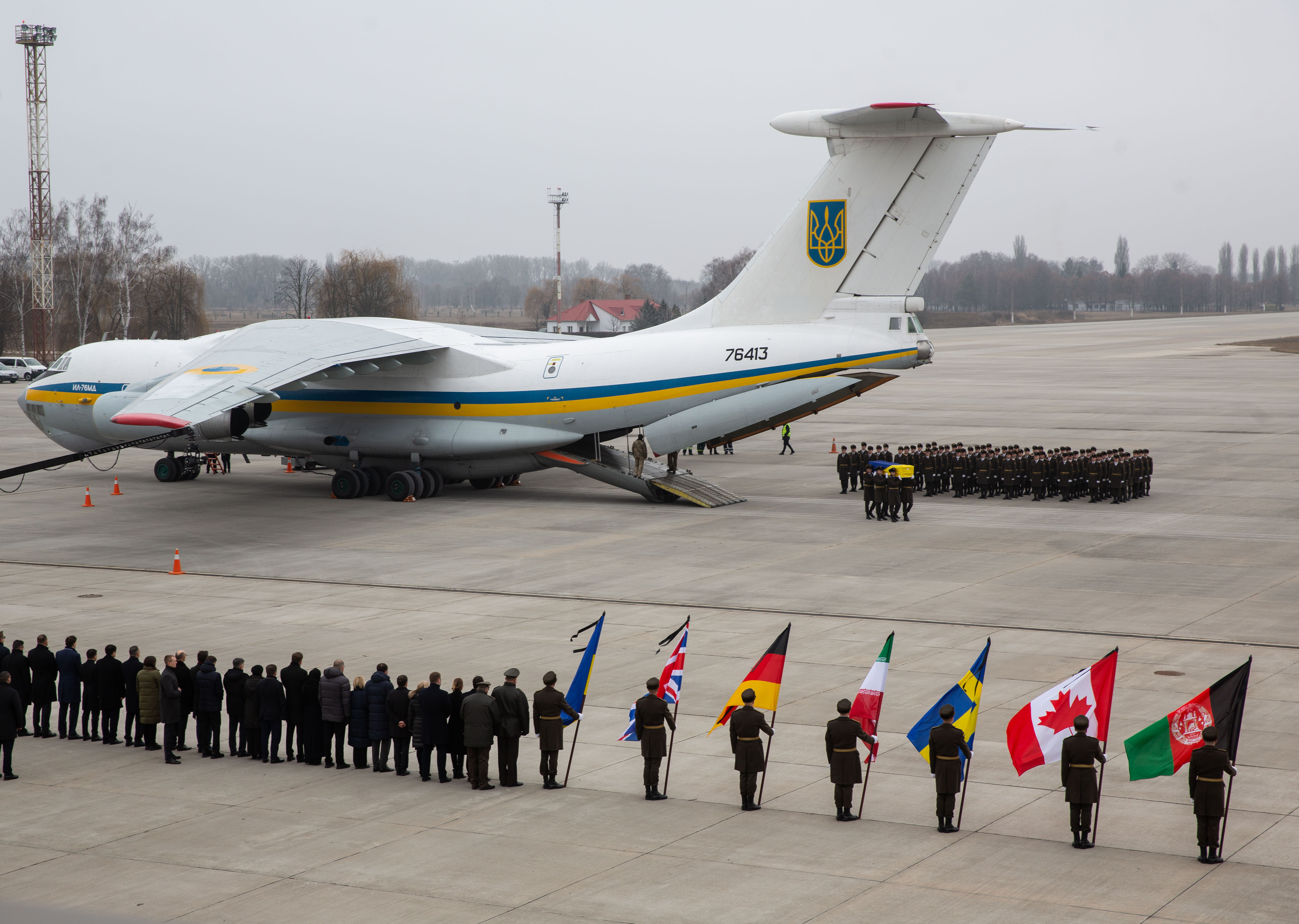
Commemoration of the victims of the air crash in Iran at Kyiv Boryspil Airport

President Volodymyr Zelenskyy expressed condolences to the relatives of the victims and cut short his diplomatic visit in Oman. He later added that several aircraft had been prepared in Kyiv to travel to Tehran to transport the dead. He declared 9 January a national day of mourning, with Ukrainian flags flying at half-mast on government buildings. He also announced unscheduled inspections on every airliner in the country and asked Ukrainians to refrain from visiting Iran for the time being. On 11 January Zelenskyy said, "Ukraine insists on a full admission of guilt. We expect Iran to bring those responsible to justice, return the bodies, pay compensation and issue an official apology. The investigation must be full, open and continue without delays or obstacles."

On 13 January, Ukraine's Foreign Minister, Vadym Prystaiko, said five of the countries that had citizens on board the airliner—Canada, Ukraine, Afghanistan, Sweden and the UK—would meet in London on 16 January to discuss possible legal action. On 19 January, the bodies of 11 Ukrainian citizens who died in the crash were returned to Ukraine in a solemn ceremony at the Boryspil International Airport. The coffins, which were each draped in a Ukrainian flag, were carried one by one from a Ukrainian Il-76 military plane of the 25th Transport Aviation Brigade. President Zelenskyy, Secretary of the National Security and Defense Council of Ukraine Oleksiy Danilov, Prime Minister Oleksiy Honcharuk, Chairman of the Verkhovna Rada Dmytro Razumkov, and other officials and military servicemen participated in the commemoration.

=== Canada ===
Prime Minister of Canada Justin Trudeau speaks to media.

With the large loss of Canadian life, Canadian Foreign Affairs Minister François-Philippe Champagne and Transport Minister Marc Garneau both expressed sympathy for the victims. Champagne announced that he was in touch with the Ukrainian government, and Garneau announced that Canada was offering assistance in the investigation. Prime Minister Justin Trudeau insisted on transparency and justice for the families and loved ones of the victims. On 14 January, Trudeau said tensions and escalation between Iran and the United States were responsible for the shootdown. On 17 January, the Canadian government announced that it would provide CA$25,000 to the relatives of each of the 57 Canadian citizens and permanent residents who were killed in the crash. The funds were to help cover immediate needs, like funeral and travel expenses. However, Canadian Prime Minister Justin Trudeau also said that it holds Iran financially responsible.

On 31 March 2020, Ralph Goodale was appointed as Special Advisor to the Government of Canada; Goodale will "examine lessons learned" from Flight 752, Ethiopian Airlines Flight 302, Air India Flight 182 and other air disasters and "develop a framework to guide Canada's responses to international air disasters." On 23 December 2020, Trudeau announced that the Government of Canada will designate 8 January of every year as the National Day of Remembrance for Victims of Air Disasters. On 24 June 2021, an official report from Canada placed the blame on the downing of the plane on Iranian "recklessness, incompetence, and wanton disregard for human life". When the Canada men's national soccer team were scheduled to play against Iran on 5 June 2022 at BC Place in Vancouver as preparation for the 2022 FIFA World Cup, the game was later cancelled due to backlash from the families of the victims on the flight as well as local officials, MPs, and Prime Minister Trudeau. On 7 October 2022, Trudeau announced the Iranian regime, including the IRGC and its top leaders—more than 10,000 officers and senior members—would be listed as inadmissible to Canada for their engagement in terrorism and systemic and gross human rights violations.

=== United Kingdom ===
Prime Minister Boris Johnson called for the repatriation of the bodies of the dead and pledged to work with Canada and Ukraine. Ambassador of the United Kingdom to Iran, Robert Macaire was arrested on 11 January 2020 during protests in Tehran but released shortly afterwards. The ambassador was detained on suspicion that he had joined demonstrations against the government; he denied this and clarified that he had attended an event advertised as a vigil, to pay respects to the victims, and had left five minutes after people started chanting. The British government called his arrest a "flagrant violation of international law". Macaire had been arrested 30 minutes after leaving the vigil he said he had attended, according to The Guardian. The following day Macaire was summoned to the Iranian Ministry of Foreign Affairs, in order to explain his presence during the protest. The U.S. has urged the Iranian government to issue the British ambassador a formal apology for disregarding his rights and to reiterate that all the rights of diplomats should be respected.

== In popular culture ==
Babak Payami's documentary film 752 Is Not a Number premiered at the 2022 Toronto International Film Festival.

== See also ==
- The Association of Families of Flight PS752 Victims
- 2019–2020 Iranian protests
- Islamic Republic of Iran Air Defense Force
- List of accidents and incidents involving commercial aircraft
- List of accidents and incidents involving the Boeing 737
- List of Iranian aviation accidents and incidents
- List of airliner shootdown incidents
- Similar accidents and incidents:
  - Iran Air Flight 655—(misidentified and shot down over the Persian Gulf by the USS Vincennes, 290 killed), 1988
  - Korean Air Lines Flight 007—(shot down over the Sea Of Japan by the Soviet Air Forces due to deviation from flight path and being misidentified as a spy aircraft, 269 killed), 1983
  - Malaysia Airlines Flight 17—(shot down near Hrabove, Donetsk Oblast, Ukraine by Russian controlled forces, 298 killed), 2014
  - Azerbaijan Airlines Flight 8243—(shot down over the Caspian Sea by Russia, 38 killed), 2024
