= Hamed Esmaeilion =

Iranian-Canadian social activist, author and dentist

- حامد اسماعیلیون
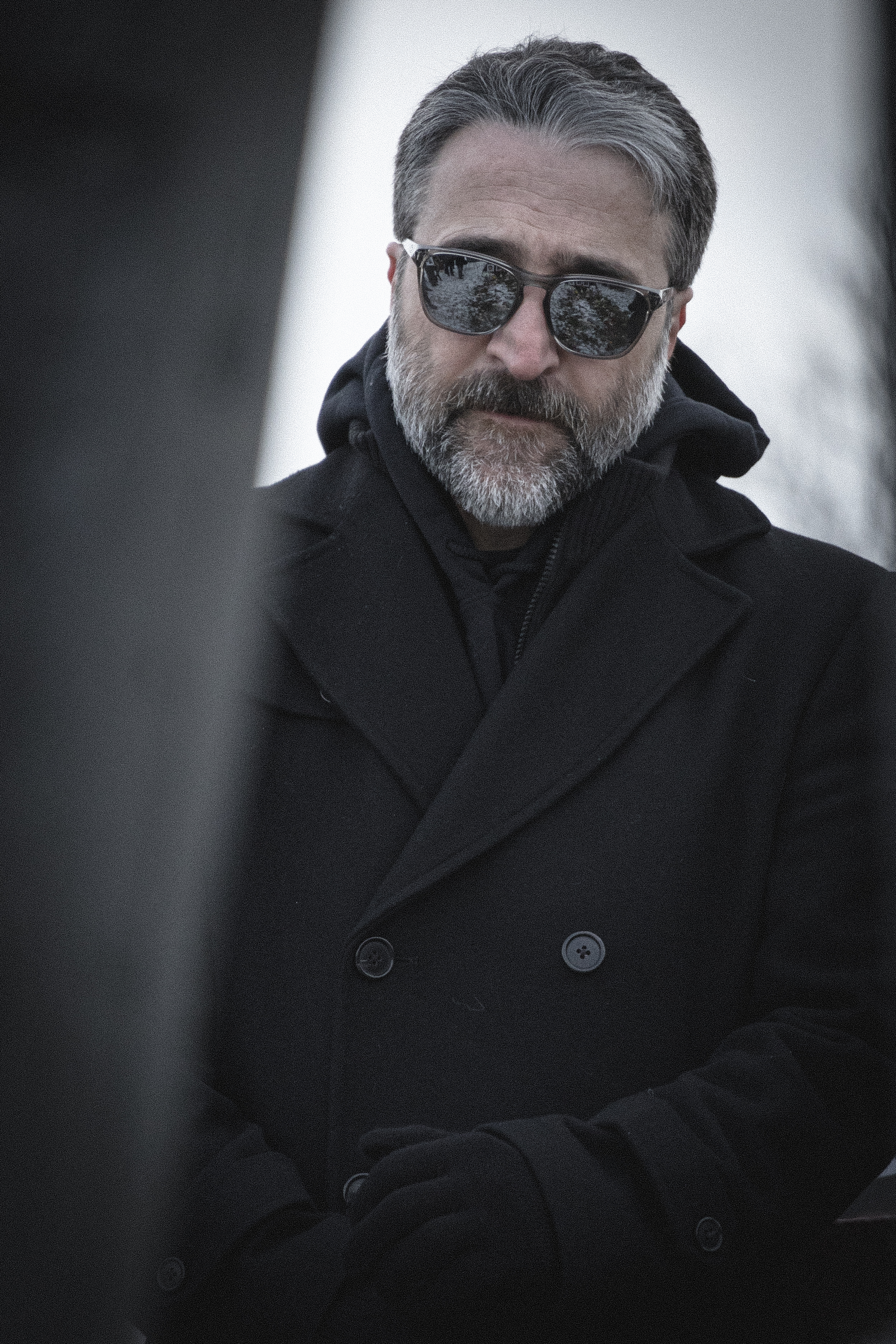
- Hamed Esmailion at the grave of his wife and daughter, two of the people who died in Ukraine International Airlines Flight 752
- Born: March 12, 1977 (age 49); Kermanshah, Imperial State of Iran
- Education: University of Tabriz
- Occupations: Social activist, author and dentist
- Title: Former President and spokesman of The Association of Victims' Families of Flight PS752
- Spouse: Parisa Eghbalian (died 2020)
- Children: Reera (deceased)

Hamed Esmaeilion (Persian: حامد اسماعیلیون, born March 12, 1977) is an Iranian-Canadian social activist and author. Esmaeilion won the Hooshang Golshiri Literary Awards for two of his books, Dr. Datis and Thyme is not Fair.

Esmaeilion was the president and former spokesman of The Association of Families of Flight PS752 Victims. He resigned on 7 March 2023, after announcing he is planning to focus more on the Mahsa Amini protests.

== Early life and career ==
His parents were originally from Arak, Iran and moved to Kermanshah where Hamed was born and grew up. He studied Dentistry at the University of Tabriz between 1995 and 2000. Afterwards, he worked and lived in various parts of Iran, such as Golestan, Mazandaran and Tehran provinces for several years. He immigrated to Canada together with his family in 2010 and lived in Richmond Hill, Ontario.

== Literary life ==
As a blogger, Esmaeilion began his literary career by publishing two collections of short stories, Thyme is not Fair (2008, winner of the Houshang Golshiri Award) and The Canary Owner (2010). He published two novels, Dr Datis (2013, Zavosh) and Gamasiab Has No Fish (2014), the former was also awarded the Golshiri Award.

== Death of his wife and daughter ==
Parisa Eghbalian (Esmaeilion's wife) and Reera Esmaeilion (his daughter), flew with Ukraine International Airlines Flight 752 from Tehran to Kyiv on 8 January 2020. This flight was shot down by two surface-to-air missiles of the Islamic Revolutionary Guard Corps (IRGC) shortly after takeoff, which the IRGC said they mistook for a ballistic missile , killing all 176 passengers and crew aboard, including Esmaeilion's wife and daughter. The flight was supposed to take off at 5:15 (local time) but was delayed; eventually it flew on 6:12, was then struck after a few minutes and crashed near the city of Parand.

Esmaeilion is one of the founders and was also the president and spokesman of The Association of Families of Flight PS752 Victims until March 2023, which he said were trying to "take legal action for this crime" and "commemorate the memory of the dead". He was later featured in 752 Is Not a Number, a 2022 documentary film directed by Babak Payami, and in The Flight, a 2026 documentary film directed by Soran Mardookhi.

== Opposition to the Iranian government ==
During the Mahsa Amini protests, an internet blackout followed by a cyber attack targeted "the Covenant", the movement's initial leader, leaving the protesters without direction. In the aftermath, key Iranian opposition figures outside the country—Reza Pahlavi, Crown Prince of Iran, soccer player Ali Karimi, Esmaeilion, and women's rights activist Masih Alinejad—formed a coalition. They amplified their message through media outlets such as BBC and Iran International, assuming leadership of the movement.

On October 1, 2022, Esmaeilion organized a global demonstration against the Islamic Republic for Iranians living abroad, in the wake of the death of Mahsa Amini to support the Mahsa Amini protests. These rallies took place in more than 150 cities throughout the world against the Islamic Republic. Protests happened in Sydney, Melbourne, London, Edinburgh, Stockholm, Brussels, Berlin, Rome, Los Angeles and Toronto. Global news estimated that in Richmond Hill, Ontario more than 50 thousand protesters attended the rally. Esmaeilion organized another demonstration in Berlin on October 22, 2022 and invited Iranians in Europe to be the voice for protesters in Iran. The number of protesters were estimated at about 80,000 to 100,000 by ABC news.

In March 2023, he resigned as the president and spokesman of The Association of Families of Flight PS752 Victims to focus more on his role in Iran's "Women, Life, Freedom" protests. Despite concerns from many, including members of the Covenant, who believed the movement had been "hijacked" or "emotionalized," the protests persisted for several more months before eventually collapsing. A few weeks later, the coalition itself disbanded.

== See also ==
- Human rights in Iran
- Islamic Revolution
