= Beer flight =

Method of variety beer tasting

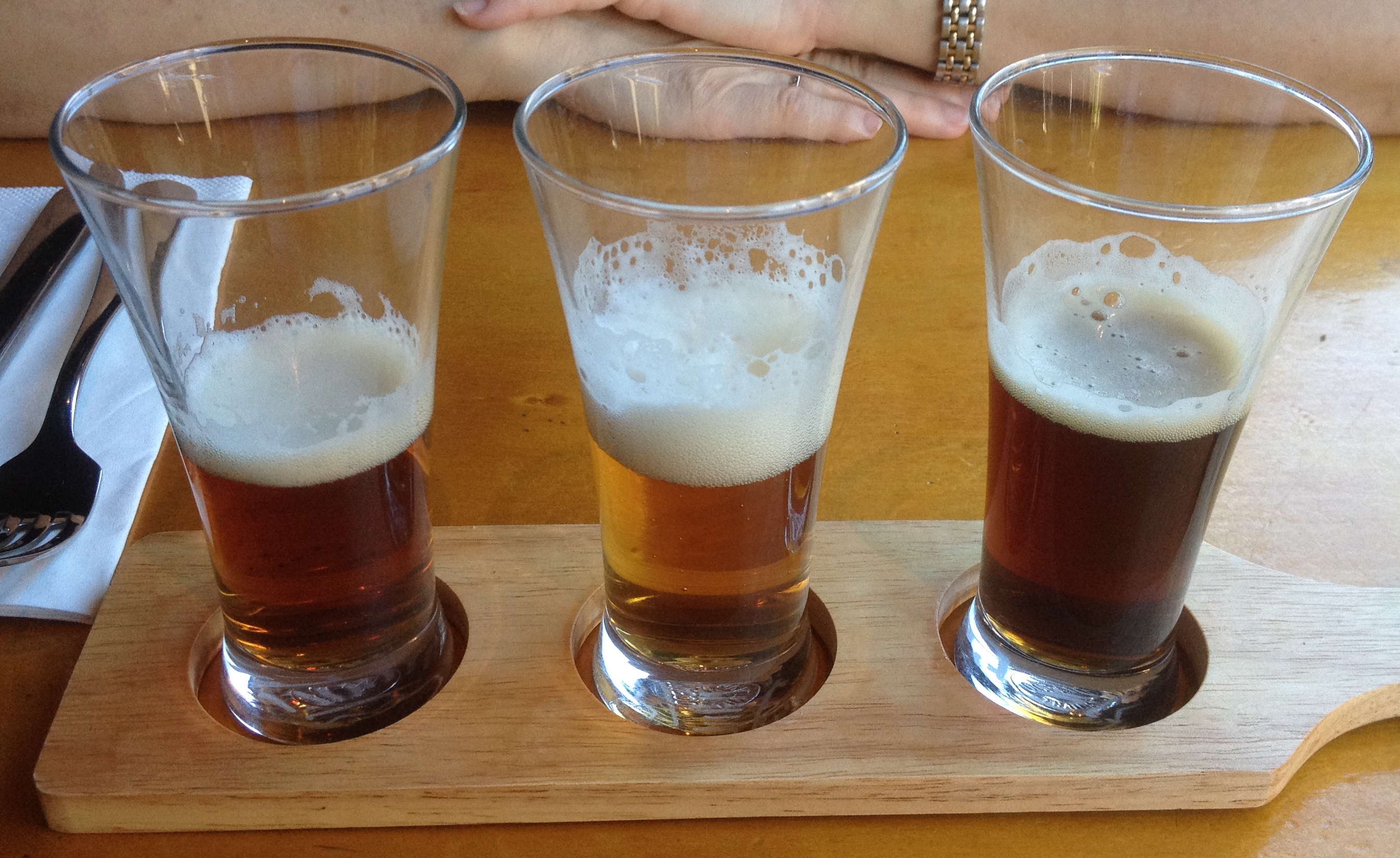
A flight of three beers, on a wooden beer paddle, served by a bar in Brisbane, Australia

A beer flight or beer stick is a method of serving a variety of beers, in relatively small quantities, for tasting.

A typical flight consists of three or more one-third of a pint (or anything from 2-5 ounces) glasses of different beers, which may be presented on a dedicated frame or tray. The tray may also be known as a beer stick, or beer paddle.

A flight may include several beers (say, a pilsner, an IPA and a stout) from one brewery, or the same style but from several breweries, or a combination of both.

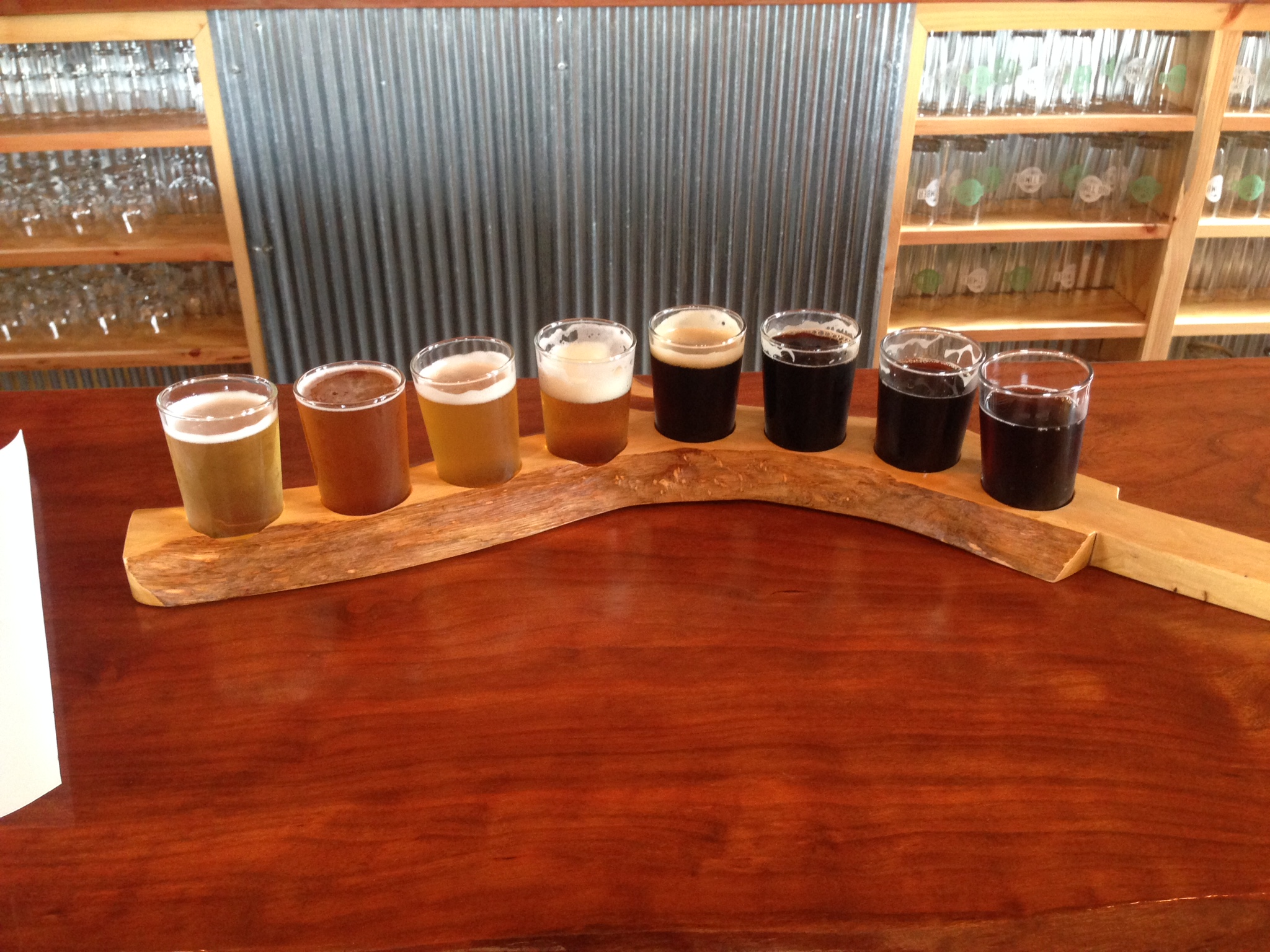
A flight of eight beers, served on a curved beer stick, arranged in order from light to dark, at a bar in West Virginia, United States

Beers may be presented—and intended for consumption—in a deliberately chosen order, such as light-to-dark, low-to-high strength or young-to-old.

A variety of beer flight kits, comprising glasses and a compatible tray, are sold for use at home.

== See also ==
- Beer sommelier
