= Flighting =

Flighting may refer to:

- Flighting (advertising), a technique for scheduling broadcast commercials
- Flighting (cricket), changing the speed of delivery in order to deceive the batsman
- Flighting, the helical blade of an auger (drill)
