= 752 Is Not a Number =

- Directed by: Babak Payami
- Written by: Babak Payami
- Produced by: Babak Payami
- Starring: Hamed Esmaeilion
- Cinematography: Amir Ghorbani Nia
- Edited by: Hooman Shams
- Production company: Payam
- Release date: September 11, 2022 (TIFF)
- Running time: 90 minutes
- Country: Canada
- Language: English

752 Is Not a Number is a 2022 Canadian documentary film, directed by Babak Payami. The film centres on Hamed Esmaeilion, an Iranian dentist who is seeking information and justice following the death of his wife and daughter in Iran's 2020 shootdown of Ukraine International Airlines Flight 752.

The film premiered at the 2022 Toronto International Film Festival on September 11, 2022, and was second runner-up for the People's Choice Award for Documentaries.
