= Flyte (disambiguation) =

Flyte may refer to:

- Flyte, a children's novel by Angie Sage
- Flyte (chocolate bar), chocolate bar by Mars, Incorporated
- Flyte (band), an English indie-pop band
- FLYTE, earlier name of American boy band later known as Midnight Red
- The aristocratic family in Brideshead Revisited

== See also ==
- Flyting, a contest of exchanged insults, often in verse
