= Flights (band) =

English band

- Origin: Bristol
- Genres: Progressive rock Alternative rock Post-rock
- Years active: 2010 – present
- Label: Scylla Records
- Members: Joel Pearce; Joe Newcombe; Dean Bowden; Adam Cann
- Website: www.flightsband.co.uk

Flights are an English alternative/progressive rock band formed in May 2010 in Bristol. The band comprises Joel Pearce on vocals/guitars, Joe Newcombe on guitars/vocals, Dean Bowden on bass/vocals and Adam Cann on drums.

In describing their music, Cann has said "We’ve fallen into progressive rock – soundscapy too I think.” Flights cite their primary influences as Oceansize, Radiohead, Reuben and Yourcodenameis:milo. Flights have also described their style as "Some big guitars, some pretty guitars, irregular time signatures, harmonised vocals and a whole lotta groove."

== History ==
=== Formation ===
Joe Newcombe, Adam Cann and Joel Pearce come from Thornbury, a market town in South Gloucestershire approximately 12 miles (19 km) north of Bristol. From age 13, Newcombe and Cann had played together in various bands (Cradle Of Fluff, Alcoholic Spider). They met Pearce (then a member of Enigma Design) while playing in pubs in the Thornbury region. When Newcombe went to university he met Dean Bowden and subsequently Newcombe, Bowden and Cann went on to play together in a band called Just For Hustlers. Deciding they wanted to try something different, they then recruited Pearce (who had discussed starting a band with Cann during Friday drinking sessions) and thus completed the Flights line-up. Flights played their first gig in a small Bristol venue called The Louisiana debuting the tracks "Charity Calendars" and "The Mapmaker" among others.

=== 2010 - 2011 (first EP) ===
For the majority of 2010 Flights divided their time between touring and writing sessions.

In September 2010, Flights recorded their debut EP Flights at Outhouse Studios in Reading. The six tracks comprising Flights were engineered, produced and mixed by James Billinge assisted by Tom Hollister. Also present behind the desk was Outhouse Studios head John Mitchell (It Bites, Kino, Frost* and Arena). The EP's artwork was designed by Bristol freelance graphic designer Nic Bennett.

On 28 January 2011 the band announced the launch of their website.

On 27 April 2011 the band launched a YouTube video for "The Pretence", the lead track on Flights. The video was directed by Bristol photographer Alex Gregory.

The Flights EP was released on 30 May 2011 via iTunes and the band's store.

On 3 June 2011 the band announced the availability of "Judge", the second track from Flights, on YouTube. The video accompanying the song was a static shot of the EP's artwork.

On 17 June 2011 the band announced the release of the free download single "Wires & Code" from Flights. The release was accompanied by a video which was again directed by Alex Gregory. The band also relaunched their website on the same day.

On 18 August 2011 the band announced the availability of Flights through Bandcamp.

Throughout 2011 Flights continued to tour regularly whilst also finding time for album writing sessions.

On 19 December 2011 the band announced the availability of their version of the Christmas song "Carol Of The Bells". The video was viewable at the Kerrang website and the track was available for free download through the file sharing site musicglue.

=== 2012 ===
2012 saw the continuation of live dates and writing/recording sessions.

On 1 May 2012 Flights announced a YouTube trailer video for forthcoming music.

On 21 May 2012 Flights announced that a new single, "Eleven", would be released in June on Scylla Records.

=== 2014 ===
On 6 October 2014 the 'History Be Kind' studio album was released on Scylla Records on vinyl. Later added to the Scylla Bandcamp on 9 February 2016

== Discography ==
EPs

- Flights (2011)

Singles

- "Wires & Code" (2011) (Download Single)

Studio albums

- "History Be Kind" (2014) (Numbered Vinyl, Digital Download )
