= Flight (sculpture) =

Public art work by Arlie Sinaiko

- Artist: Arlie Sinaiko
- Year: 1966
- Type: bronze
- Dimensions: 120 cm × 140 cm × 76 cm (49 in × 57 in × 30 in)
- Location: Lynden Sculpture Garden; Milwaukee, Wisconsin
- Owner: Bradley Family Foundation

Flight is a public art work by artist Arlie Sinaiko located at the Lynden Sculpture Garden near Milwaukee, Wisconsin. The sculpture is an abstract form made bronze; it is V-shaped and installed on the lawn.
