= Beer sommelier =

Person with proficiency in beer tasting

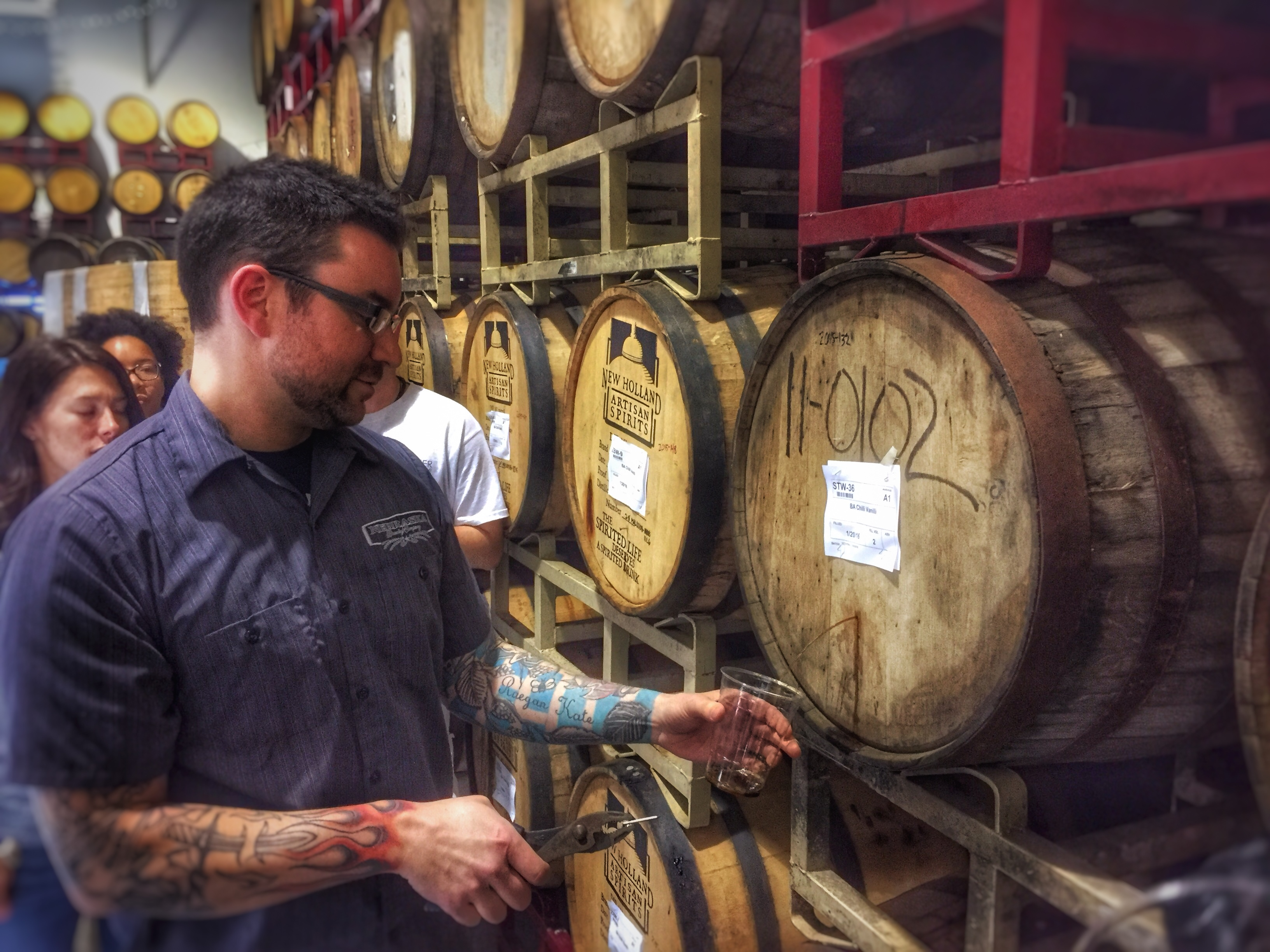
A beer sommelier tapping a barrel for a taste at Nebraska Brewing Company

A beer sommelier, also known as a cicerone in the United States, is a trained professional, working in the hospitality and alcoholic beverage industry, who specializes in the service and knowledge of beer, similar to a traditional wine sommelier. The knowledge required for certification includes an understanding of styles, brewing, ingredients, history of beer and brewing, glassware, beer service, draught systems, beer tasting, and food pairing. The profession is relatively new but growing.

== Description ==
The work of a beer sommelier is varied due to its infancy and the broadness of the beer and brewing industry. Typically people who qualify through one of the accreditation schemes work in the hospitality industry and will have responsibility for choosing and purchasing beer, oversee its correct storage and service, attend customers and educate staff. In the brewing industry, beer sommeliers may take tours and tastings as well as be sales representatives. In the retail industry, they may be in charge of the buying and selection of beers available for purchase. Self-employed beer sommeliers may undertake a range of jobs including pub and restaurant consulting and staff training, beer writing, hosting tasting events and beer judging for competitions at festivals, as well as in print for beer reviews.

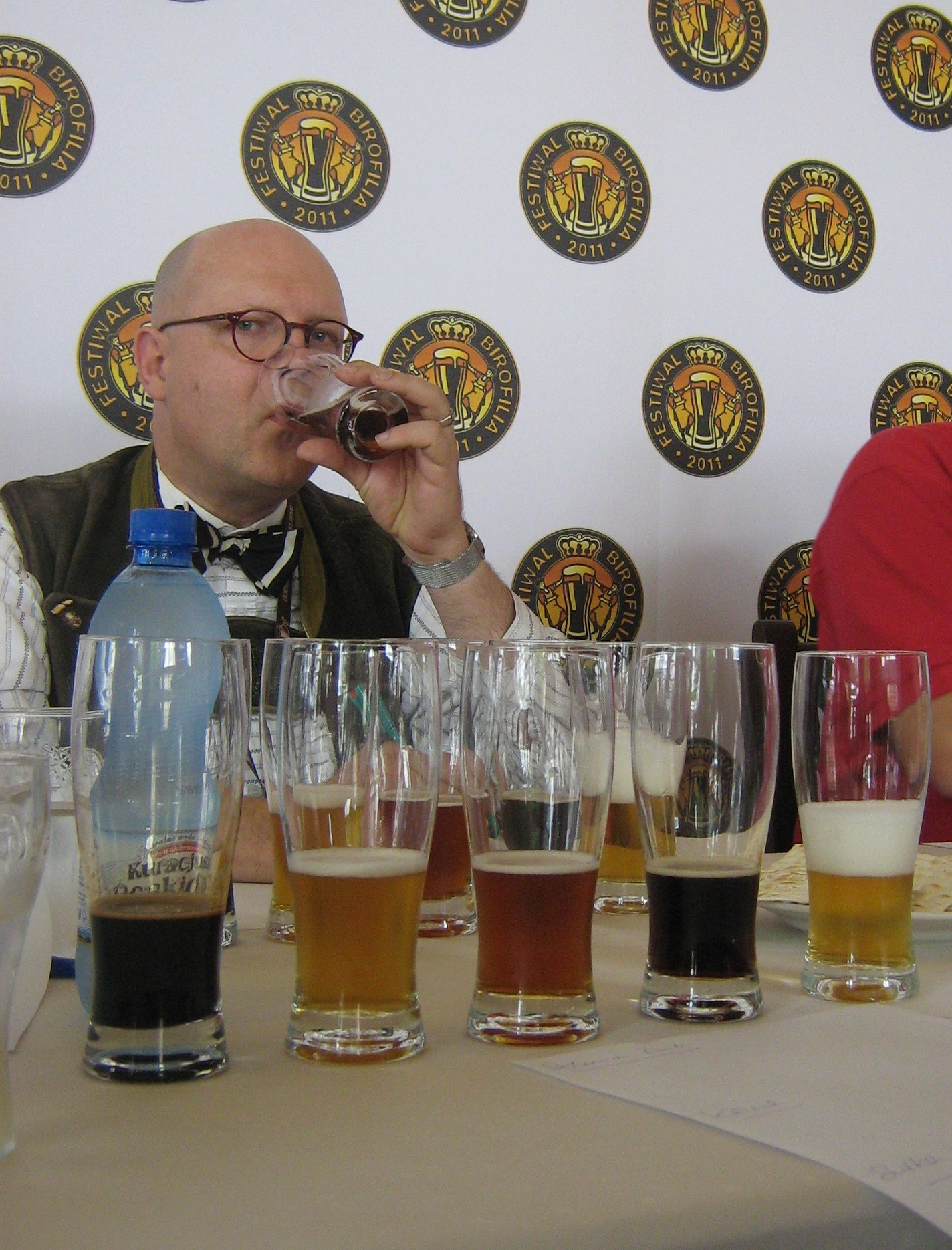
Beer tasting in Poland

There are a number of private organisations that offer courses and certification for individuals as a beer sommelier, not always using this term, but one of their own creation. The Guild of Beer Sommeliers is a membership organisation for qualified beer sommeliers, recognising the many certifications available. One of the largest certifications is the "Cicerone" program, which is a registered trademark of the Craft Beer Institute. However, the term has seen usage in a generic sense as well.

== Beer tasting ==
Beer tasting is the act of assessing the flavor and quality of beer via the subjective process of sampling the beer. Some organizations provide beer rating systems to quantify the results of beer tasting.

The Beer Judge Certification Program (BJCP) is a non-profit organization formed in 1985 "to promote beer literacy and the appreciation of real beer, and to recognize beer tasting and evaluation skills". The BJCP has administered the Beer Judge Examination to 10,968 individuals worldwide, 6,898 are currently active judges in the program, with 851 holding the rank of National or higher, and its members have judged over 1,350,724 beers and have sanctioned over 8,218 competitions.

== See also ==
- Sommelier
