= Iran–North Korea relations =

- North Korea: Iran

Diplomatic mission
- North Korean Embassy, Tehran: Iranian Embassy, Pyongyang

Envoy
- Ambassador Kang Sam-hyon: Ambassador Seyed Mohsen Emadi

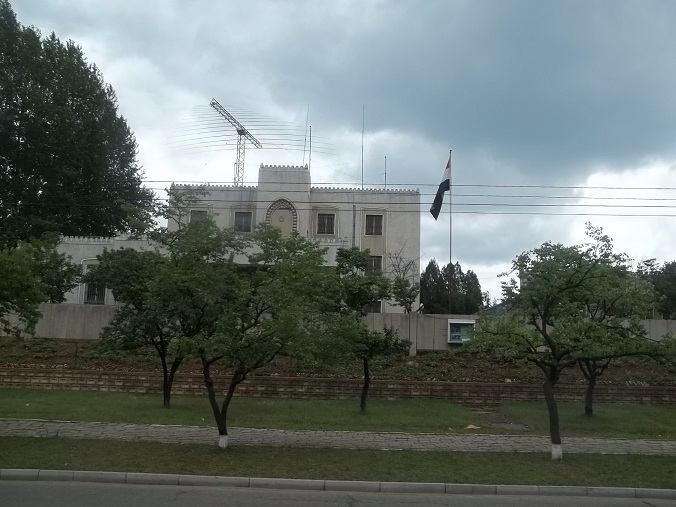
Iranian embassy in Pyongyang, North Korea

Iran–North Korea relations (Korean: 이란-조선민주주의인민공화국 관계; Persian: روابط ایران و کرۀ شمالی) are described as being positive by official news agencies of two countries. Diplomatic relations improved following the Iranian Revolution in 1979 and the establishment of an Islamic Republic. Iran and North Korea pledge cooperation in educational, scientific, and cultural spheres. Some media reports claim this cooperation extends to nuclear cooperation, though official U.S. government publications and academic studies have disputed this. The United States has been greatly concerned by North Korea's arms deals with Iran, which started during the 1980s with North Korea acting as a third party in arms deals between the Communist bloc and Iran, as well as selling domestically produced weapons to Iran, and North Korea continues to sell missiles to Iran. North Korea and Iran are the remaining two members of George W. Bush's "axis of evil".

The United States of America designates both nations as State Sponsors of Terrorism, and they reciprocate this shared enmity. Despite this, Iran is one of the few countries in the world that has a good relationship with both North and South Korea.

== History ==
The Persian-Korean relationship started with cultural exchanges date back to the Three Kingdoms of Korea era, more than 1600 years ago by the way of the Silk Road. A dark blue glass was found in the Cheonmachong Tomb, one of Silla's royal tombs unearthed in Gyeongju, and an exotic golden sword was found in Gyerim-ro, a street also located in Gyeongju. These relics are presumed to have been sent to Silla from ancient Iran or Persia through the Silk Road. It was only the Koryeo Dynasty during King Hyeonjong's reign when trade with Persia was officially recorded in Korean history. But in academic circles, it is presumed that both countries had active cultural exchanges during the 7th century Silla era which means the relationship between Korea and Iran dates to 1500 years ago. "In a history book written by the Persian scholar Ibn Khordadbeh, it states that Silla is located at the eastern end of China and reads 'In this beautiful country Silla, there is much gold, majestic cities and hardworking people. Their culture is comparable with Persia'.

Other items uncovered during the excavation include a silver bowl engraved with an image of the Persian goddess Anahita; a golden dagger from Persia; clay busts; and figurines portraying Middle Eastern merchants. Samguk sagi — the official chronicle of the Three Kingdoms era, compiled in 1145 — contains further descriptions of commercial items sold by Middle Eastern merchants and widely used in Silla society.

During the first decades of the Cold War, the Imperial State of Iran had no relations with the Democratic People's Republic of Korea, particularly due to Iran having relations with the Republic of Korea that were established in 1962. Both countries were allied in the U.S.-led Western Bloc. In 1971-1972, the DPRK expressed support for Iraq's territorial claims against Iran, and condemned the Iranian seizure of Abu Musa and the Greater and Lesser Tunbs. In September 1972, however, the visit of an Iranian table tennis team in the DPRK indicated the start of a rapprochement between Pyongyang and Tehran. In April 1973, Iran established diplomatic relations with North Korea, a decision that Deputy Foreign Minister Ahmad Mirfendereski justified on the grounds that "keeping the North Koreans isolated would not serve a useful purpose; on the contrary, bringing them more fully into the diplomatic world would make them behave more responsibly." In the following years, the two states concluded various bilateral agreements related to trade and payment (1973), cultural cooperation (1974), and inter-news agency (1978), but Iran's overall contacts with the DPRK lagged far behind its extensive cooperation with the ROK. In 1979, the pro-U.S. monarchy was deposed and was replaced with an Islamic Republic, which facilitated the improvement of Iranian-North Korean relations. North Korea's Rodong Sinmun consistently refrained from covering the Iranian protests until the departure of the Shah and the collapse of Shahpour Bakhtiar’s provisional government, but once Ayatollah Ruhollah Khomeini established his administration, the DPRK diplomats in Tehran made intense efforts to have good relations with his government. During the Iran hostage crisis, North Korea was one of the few states that openly sided with Tehran against Washington. In January 1980, the DPRK concluded its first trade agreement with the Islamic Republic of Iran. In early October 1980, shortly after the outbreak of the Iran-Iraq War, three Iranian Boeing 747 cargo planes flew to North Korea and returned with medical supplies and artillery shells, which is the first known instance of military cooperation between the two countries.

Despite the two countries' shared antagonism to U.S. foreign policies, the specific national interests of the North Korea and the Islamic Republic of Iran were often considerably different from each other. For instance, North Korea, though it provided Iran with military assistance during the Iran–Iraq War (an act that induced Baghdad to break diplomatic relations with Pyongyang on 10 October 1980), made repeated attempts to normalize its relations with the Iraqi government. In 1982, the North Korean authorities secretly invited an Iraqi delegation to Pyongyang, but the Iraqi government sent only an unofficial representative. In 1983, the head of the DPRK trade office in Kuwait attempted to persuade Iraqi Foreign Minister Tariq Aziz to allow North Korea to reopen its embassy in Baghdad, but to no avail, because the DPRK wanted to reach reconciliation with Iraq without discontinuing its arms shipments to Iran. These aborted North Korean initiatives revealed that Pyongyang was not ideologically committed to Iran's crusade against Saddam Hussein.

In May 1989, Iranian President Ali Khamenei undertook a four-day visit to North Korea, becoming the highest-level Iranian leader to visit to North Korea since the Iranian Revolution. More than 100,000 North Koreans turned out to greet Khamenei in Pyongyang during the visit. North Korean leader Kim Il Sung hosted a banquet at the Kumsusan Assembly Hall as well as a 5,000-person performance titled “Song of Happiness” at the February 8 House of Culture, which included a North Korean choir performing the Iranian revolutionary anthem "Ey Shahid". Khamenei, in turn, reciprocated with a luncheon at his lodging, followed by talks and an exchange of gifts. By the conclusion of the visit, both sides held the first Iranian-DPRK Intergovernmental Commission on Economic Cooperation. According to Ruhollah Khomeini's son Ahmad, Khamenei was selected by his father as his successor on the basis of his visit to North Korea.

Iranian leaders decided to maintain diplomatic relations with both North and South Korea. During the recent inter-Korean security crises (like the ROKS Cheonan sinking and the Bombardment of Yeonpyeong), Iranian news agencies usually quoted the statements of the Korean Central News Agency in parallel with the statements made by Western and South Korean politicians, without showing any detectable preference for either side.

Nor were the two states in full concord in adopting a position toward the various manifestations of international terrorism. On the one hand, both Iran and the North Korea provided military assistance to Hezbollah in Lebanon, and they actively sided with Syrian president Bashar al-Assad against terrorist organizations such as the Islamic State of Iraq and the Levant during the Syrian civil war. On the other hand, North Korea and Iran held substantially different views about the conflicts in which the Taliban, Boko Haram, and the Iraqi wing of ISIL were involved. While the North Koreans stressed that U.S. efforts to suppress these organizations constituted interference in the internal affairs of Afghanistan, Nigeria, and Iraq, the Iranian leaders, who regarded Sunni Salafi extremism as a direct threat to their own interests, repeatedly accused America of not striving hard enough to eliminate these groups or even seeking to reach an agreement with them.

In 2013, North Korea opened the Ar-Rahman Mosque on the premises of the Iranian embassy, making North Korea the only nation besides Armenia to have a Shia mosque but no Sunni mosque.

During the intertwined North Korean and Iranian nuclear crises, the favorable or unfavorable views that Iranian observers and policy-makers formed about North Korea's nuclear policies were considerably influenced by their political affiliation. In general, Iranian reformists were more negatively disposed toward the DPRK than conservative hard-liners, as they were of the opinion that Iran could not afford to pursue a confrontational nuclear strategy akin to North Korea's policy. Right-wing conservative hard-liners cited North Korea's open nuclear defiance of America's might as a positive example that Iran should emulate and supported North Korean decisions but if the DPRK happened to enter nuclear talks with the U.S., they monitored the negotiations with thinly veiled distrust.

== Ambassadors ==
=== List of North Korean ambassadors to Iran ===
- Kim Jong-nam (2000–2004)
- Kim Chang-ryong (2004–2010)
- Jo In-chol (2010–2014)
- Kang Sam-hyon (2014–2020)
- Han Song-u (2020–present)

=== List of Iranian ambassadors to North Korea ===
- Aliasghar Nahavandian
- Seyed Morteza Mirheidari (1997)
- Mohammad Ganjidoost (1997–2001)
- Jalaleddin Namini Mianji (2002-2007)
- Morteza Moradian (2008–2012)
- Mansour Chavoshi (2012–2016)
- Seyed Mohsen Emadi (2017–2020)
- Abbas Talebifar (2026–present)

=== Others ===
- Ri Won Il, chairman of the DPRK-Iran Friendship Association
- Anoushiravan Mohseni Bandpei, chairman of the Iran-Korea Parliamentary Friendship Group

== Military weapons ==
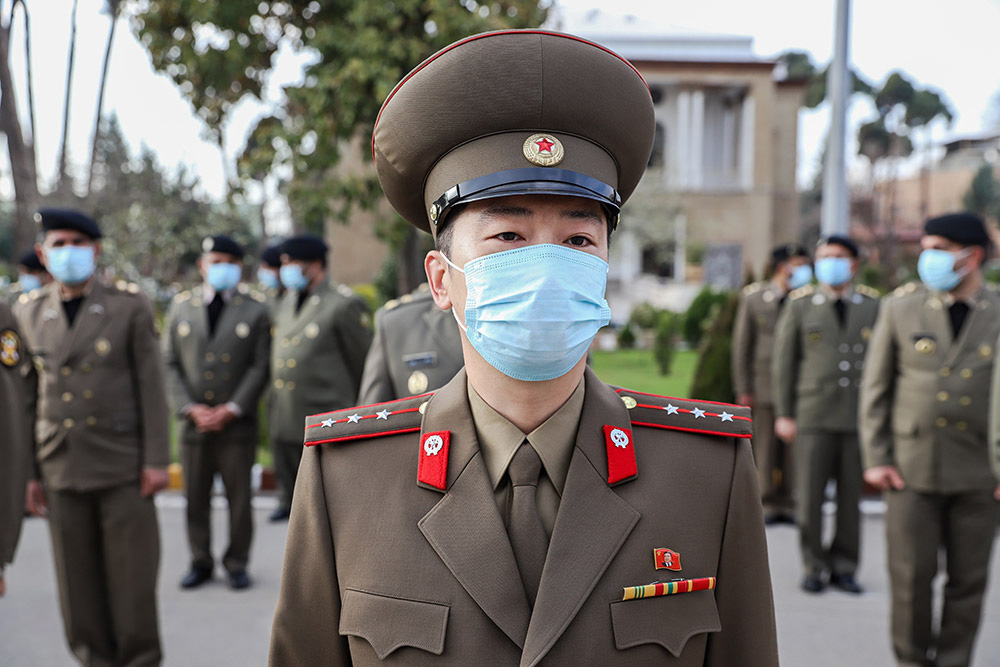
North Korean military students graduate from an Iranian military university, 2021

Since the 1980s, North Korea has become known as a reliable supplier of arms to many countries including Iran. Weapons sales between North Korea and Iran increased significantly during the Iran-Iraq war, North Korea supported Iran during the war by providing arms and weapons. This weapons sale relationship has expanded into further military cooperation including in the development of and exchange of nuclear technology. This relationship has also involved Syria.

During the Persian Gulf War, North Korea is said to have supplied Iran with a range of arms including artillery, anti-aircraft machine guns, mortars, ammunition, tanks, small arms, naval mines and anti-tank and surface-to-air missile systems. In December 2009, in contravention of an arms embargo imposed on North Korea, a shipment of North Korean arms, said to be en route for Iran, according to the Congressional Research Service, was intercepted in Thailand. These weapons included rocket launchers and surface-to-air missile parts.

In addition to weapons, North Korea and Iran have an active exchange of military expertise particularly in relation to special operations and underground facilities. North Korea is thought to have trained Iranian operators in these advanced infiltration techniques.

In March 2013, North Korea and Iran, as well as Syria, blocked a UN Arms Trade Treaty aimed at setting "standards for all cross-border transfers of conventional weapons".

Arms expert Jeffrey Lewis claims that the second stage of North Korea's Hwasong-14 ICBM is similar to the upper stages designed for the Iranian space launch vehicles.

== 2025 United States strikes on Iranian nuclear sites ==
Following the 2025 United States strikes on Iranian nuclear sites, North Korea strongly condemned the U.S. attack on Iran, describing it as a violation of Iran's territorial integrity and security interests.

== 2026 Iran war ==
North Korea denounced the joint US and Israeli strikes on Iran after the 2026 Iran war broke out in late February 2026, but its diplomatic response was less forceful than in earlier regional crises. In April 2026, South Korea's National Intelligence Service concluded that Pyongyang was keeping Tehran at a distance and had not provided any weapons, military hardware, or reconstruction aid during the conflict, despite decades of past military and missile cooperation. North Korea's restraint was explained by analysts and South Korean lawmakers as an effort to avoid upsetting Washington while maintaining the prospect of reestablishing bilateral diplomatic relations with the United States.

== See also ==
- Foreign relations of Iran
- Foreign relations of North Korea
- North Korean support for Iran during the Iran–Iraq War
