= List of diplomatic missions of Iran =

This is a list of diplomatic missions of Iran. Iran has a substantial diplomatic network, reflecting its foreign affairs priorities within the Islamic and Non-Aligned world.

In Washington, D.C. the Embassy of Pakistan looks after the interests of Iran in the United States.

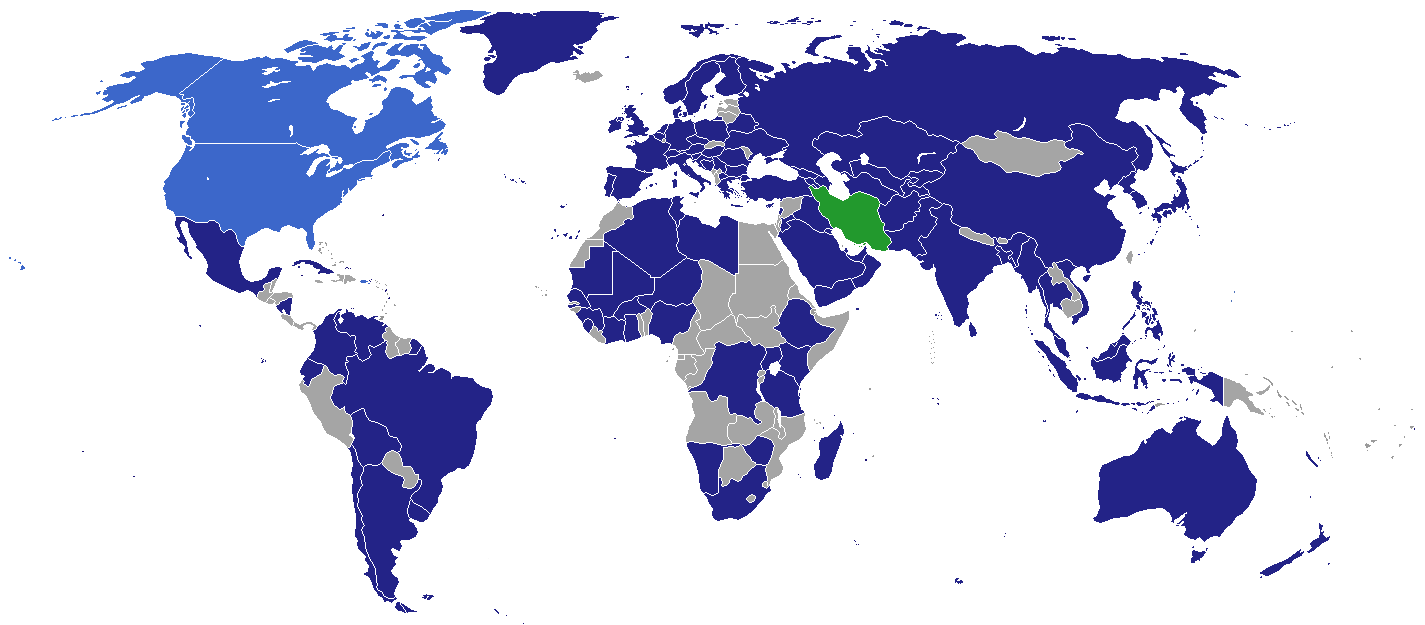
Iranian diplomatic missions

== Current missions ==
=== Africa ===
- Algeria
  - Algiers (Embassy)
- Burkina Faso
  - Ouagadougou (Embassy)
- Congo-Kinshasa
  - Kinshasa (Embassy) (Note: Also accredited to Congo-Brazzaville.)
- Ethiopia
  - Addis Ababa (Embassy) (Note: Also accredited to Djibouti, South Sudan, & African Union.)
- Ghana
  - Accra (Embassy) (Note: Also accredited to Liberia & Togo.)
- Guinea
  - Conakry (Embassy)
- Ivory Coast
  - Abidjan (Embassy) (Note: Also accredited to Cameroon, Gabon, & São Tomé and Príncipe.)
- Kenya
  - Nairobi (Embassy) (Note: Also accredited to Eritrea.)
- Libya
  - Tripoli (Embassy)
- Madagascar
  - Antananarivo (Embassy) (Note: Also accredited to Mauritius & Seychelles.)
- Mali
  - Bamako (Embassy)
- Mauritania
  - Nouakchott (Embassy)
- Namibia
  - Windhoek (Embassy)
- Niger
  - Niamey (Embassy) (Note: Also accredited to Benin & Chad.)
- Nigeria
  - Abuja (Embassy) (Note: Also accredited to Equatorial Guinea.)
- Senegal
  - Dakar (Embassy) (Note: Also accredited to Cape Verde & Gambia.)
- Sierra Leone
  - Freetown (Embassy)
- South Africa
  - Pretoria (Embassy) (Note: Also accredited to Angola, Lesotho, & Mozambique.)
- Tanzania
  - Dar es Salaam (Embassy)
- Tunisia
  - Tunis (Embassy)
- Uganda
  - Kampala (Embassy)
- Zimbabwe
  - Harare (Embassy)

=== Americas ===
- Argentina
  - Buenos Aires (Embassy)
- Bolivia
  - La Paz (Embassy)
- Brazil
  - Brasília (Embassy)
- Canada
  - Ottawa (Interests Section) (Note: Under the protecting power of Switzerland.).
- Chile
  - Santiago de Chile (Embassy)
- Cuba
  - Havana (Embassy)
- Ecuador
  - Quito (Embassy)
- Mexico
  - Mexico City (Embassy) (Note: Also accredited to Belize & Guatemala.)
- Nicaragua
  - Managua (Embassy)
- United States
  - Washington, D.C. (Interests Section) (Note: Under the protecting power of Pakistan.)
- Uruguay
  - Montevideo (Embassy) (Note: Also accredited to Paraguay.)
- Venezuela
  - Caracas (Embassy) (Note: Also accredited to Trinidad and Tobago.)

=== Asia ===
- Afghanistan
  - Kabul (Embassy)
  - Herat (Consulate-General)
  - Jalalabad (Consulate-General)
  - Kandahar (Consulate-General)
  - Mazar-i Sharif (Consulate-General)
- Armenia
  - Yerevan (Embassy)
  - Kapan (Consulate-General)
- Azerbaijan
  - Baku (Embassy)
  - Nakhchivan (Consulate-General)
- Bangladesh
  - Dhaka (Embassy)
- Brunei
  - Bandar Seri Begawan (Embassy)
- China
  - Beijing (Embassy)
  - Guangzhou (Consulate-General)
  - Hong Kong (Consulate-General)
  - Shanghai (Consulate-General)
- Georgia
  - Tbilisi (Embassy)
  - Batumi (Consulate-General)
- India
  - New Delhi (Embassy)
  - Hyderabad (Consulate-General)
  - Mumbai (Consulate-General)
- Indonesia
  - Jakarta (Embassy) (Note: Also accredited to Timor-Leste & Association of Southeast Asian Nations.)
- Iraq
  - Baghdad (Embassy)
  - Basra (Consulate-General)
  - Erbil (Consulate-General)
  - Karbala (Consulate-General)
  - Najaf (Consulate-General)
  - Sulaymaniyah (Consulate-General)
- Japan
  - Tokyo (Embassy)
- Jordan
  - Amman (Embassy)
- Kazakhstan
  - Astana (Embassy)
  - Aktau (Consulate-General)
  - Almaty (Consulate-General)
- Kuwait
  - Kuwait City (Embassy)
- Kyrgyzstan
  - Bishkek (Embassy)
- Lebanon
  - Beirut (Embassy)
- Malaysia
  - Kuala Lumpur (Embassy)
- North Korea
  - Pyongyang (Embassy)
- Oman
  - Muscat (Embassy)
- Pakistan
  - Islamabad (Embassy)
  - Karachi (Consulate-General)
  - Lahore (Consulate-General)
  - Peshawar (Consulate-General)
  - Quetta (Consulate-General)
- Philippines
  - Manila (Embassy)
- Qatar
  - Doha (Embassy)
- Saudi Arabia
  - Riyadh (Embassy)
  - Jeddah (Consulate-General)
- South Korea
  - Seoul (Embassy)
- Sri Lanka
  - Colombo (Embassy) (Note: Also accredited to Maldives.)
- Tajikistan
  - Dushanbe (Embassy)
- Thailand
  - Bangkok (Embassy) (Note: Also accredited to Laos & Myanmar.)
- Turkey
  - Ankara (Embassy)
  - Erzurum (Consulate-General)
  - Istanbul (Consulate-General)
  - Trabzon (Consulate-General)
- Turkmenistan
  - Ashgabat (Embassy)
  - Mary (Consulate-General)
- United Arab Emirates
  - Abu Dhabi (Embassy)
  - Dubai (Consulate-General)
- Uzbekistan
  - Tashkent (Embassy)
- Vietnam
  - Hanoi (Embassy) (Note: Also accredited to Cambodia.)
- Yemen
  - Sanaa (Embassy)

=== Europe ===
- Austria
  - Vienna (Embassy) (Note: Also accredited to Slovakia.)
- Belarus
  - Minsk (Embassy)
- Belgium
  - Brussels (Embassy)
- Bosnia and Herzegovina
  - Sarajevo (Embassy)
- Bulgaria
  - Sofia (Embassy)
- Croatia
  - Zagreb (Embassy)
- Cyprus
  - Nicosia (Embassy)
- Czechia
  - Prague (Embassy)
- Denmark
  - Copenhagen (Embassy)
- Finland
  - Helsinki (Embassy) (Note: Also accredited to Estonia.)
- France
  - Paris (Embassy) (Note: Also accredited to Monaco.)
- Germany
  - Berlin (Embassy)
- Greece
  - Athens (Embassy)
- Holy See
  - Rome (Embassy) (Note: The Iranian Embassy to the Holy See is located outside Vatican territory in Rome.)
- Hungary
  - Budapest (Embassy)
- Ireland
  - Dublin (Embassy)
- Italy
  - Rome (Embassy)
  - Milan (Consulate-General)
- Netherlands
  - The Hague (Embassy) (Note: Also accredited to Organisation for the Prohibition of Chemical Weapons.)
- North Macedonia
  - Skopje (Embassy)
- Norway
  - Oslo (Embassy) (Note: Also accredited to Iceland.)
- Poland
  - Warsaw (Embassy) (Note: Also accredited to Lithuania.)
- Portugal
  - Lisbon (Embassy)
- Romania
  - Bucharest (Embassy)
- Russia
  - Moscow (Embassy)
  - Astrakhan (Consulate-General)
  - Kazan (Consulate-General)
- Serbia
  - Belgrade (Embassy) (Note: Also accredited to Montenegro.)
- Slovenia
  - Ljubljana (Embassy)
- Spain
  - Madrid (Embassy)
- Sweden
  - Stockholm (Embassy) (Note: Also accredited to Latvia.)
- Switzerland
  - Bern (Embassy) (Note: Also accredited to Liechtenstein.)
- Ukraine
  - Kyiv (Embassy) (Note: Also accredited to Moldova.)
- United Kingdom
  - London (Embassy)

=== Oceania ===
- Australia
  - Canberra (Embassy)
- New Zealand
  - Wellington (Embassy) (Note: Also accredited to Fiji.)

=== Multilateral organizations ===
- United Nations
  - New York City (Permanent Mission)
  - Geneva (Permanent Mission)
  - Vienna (Permanent Mission)

== Gallery ==
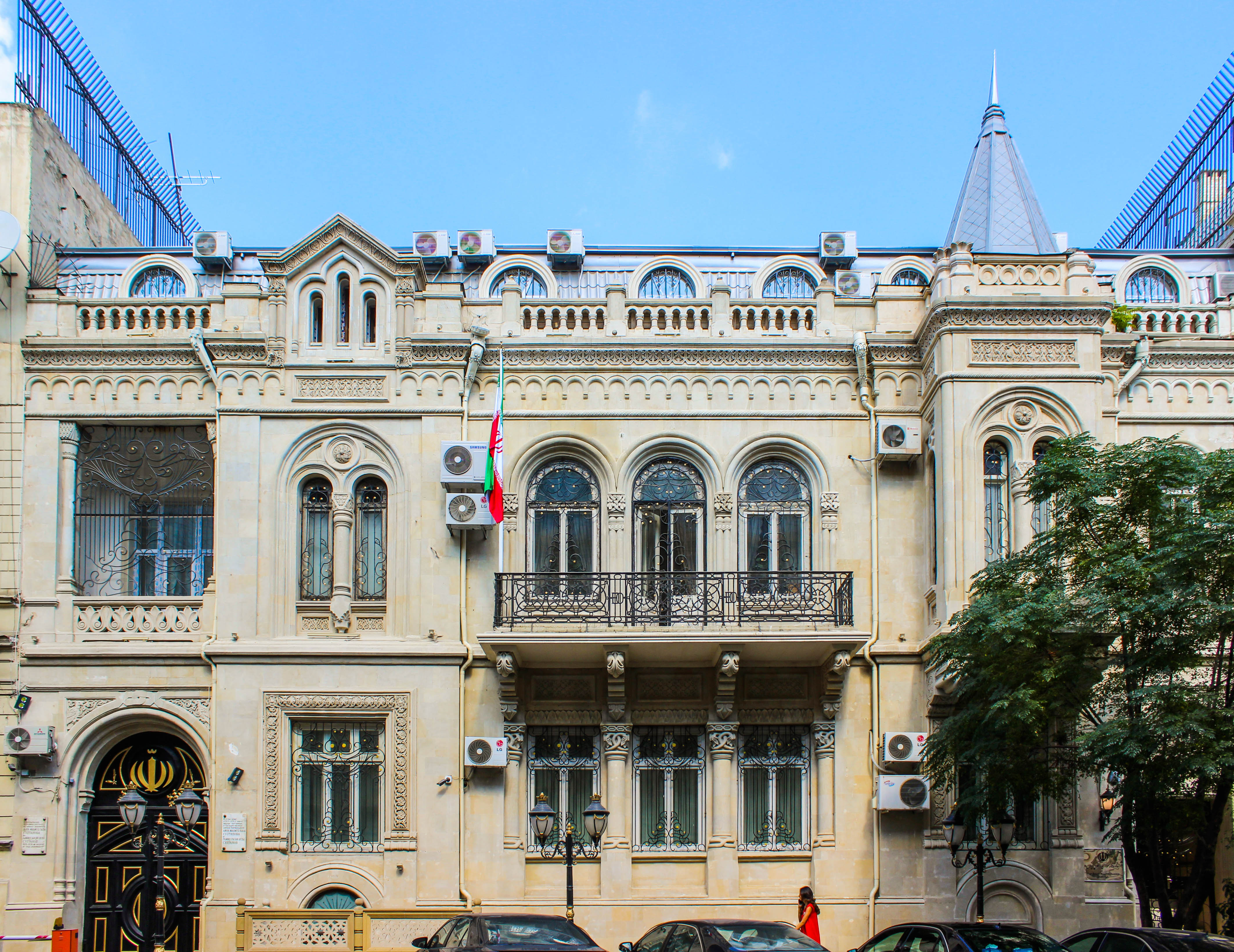
Embassy in Baku

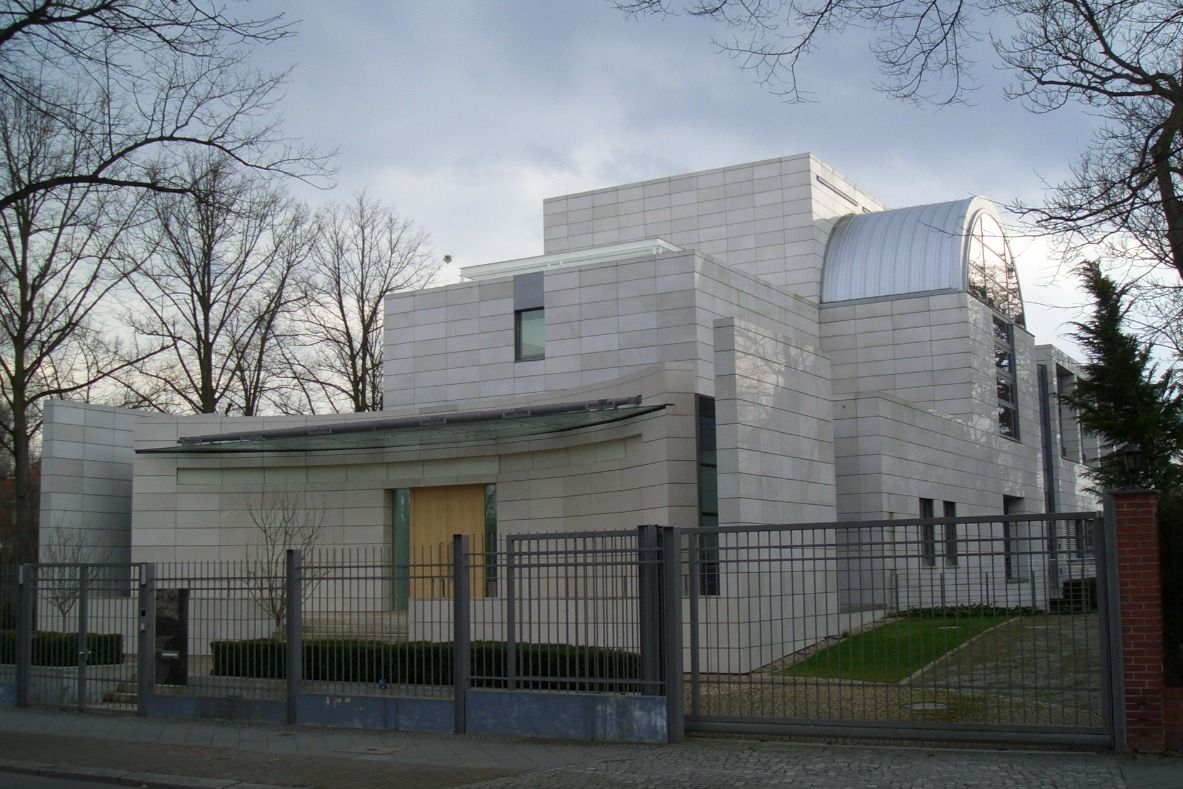
Embassy in Berlin

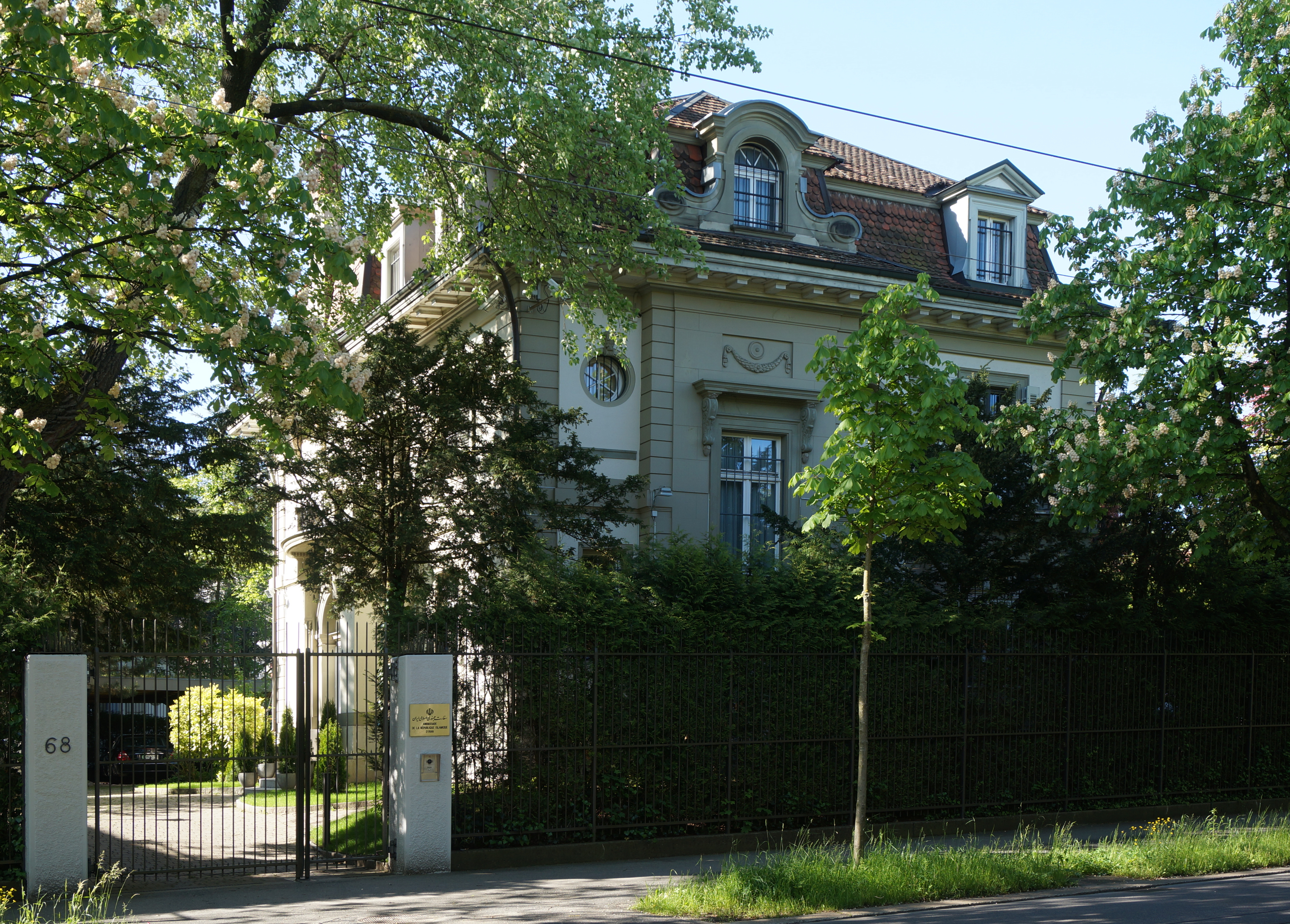
Embassy in Bern

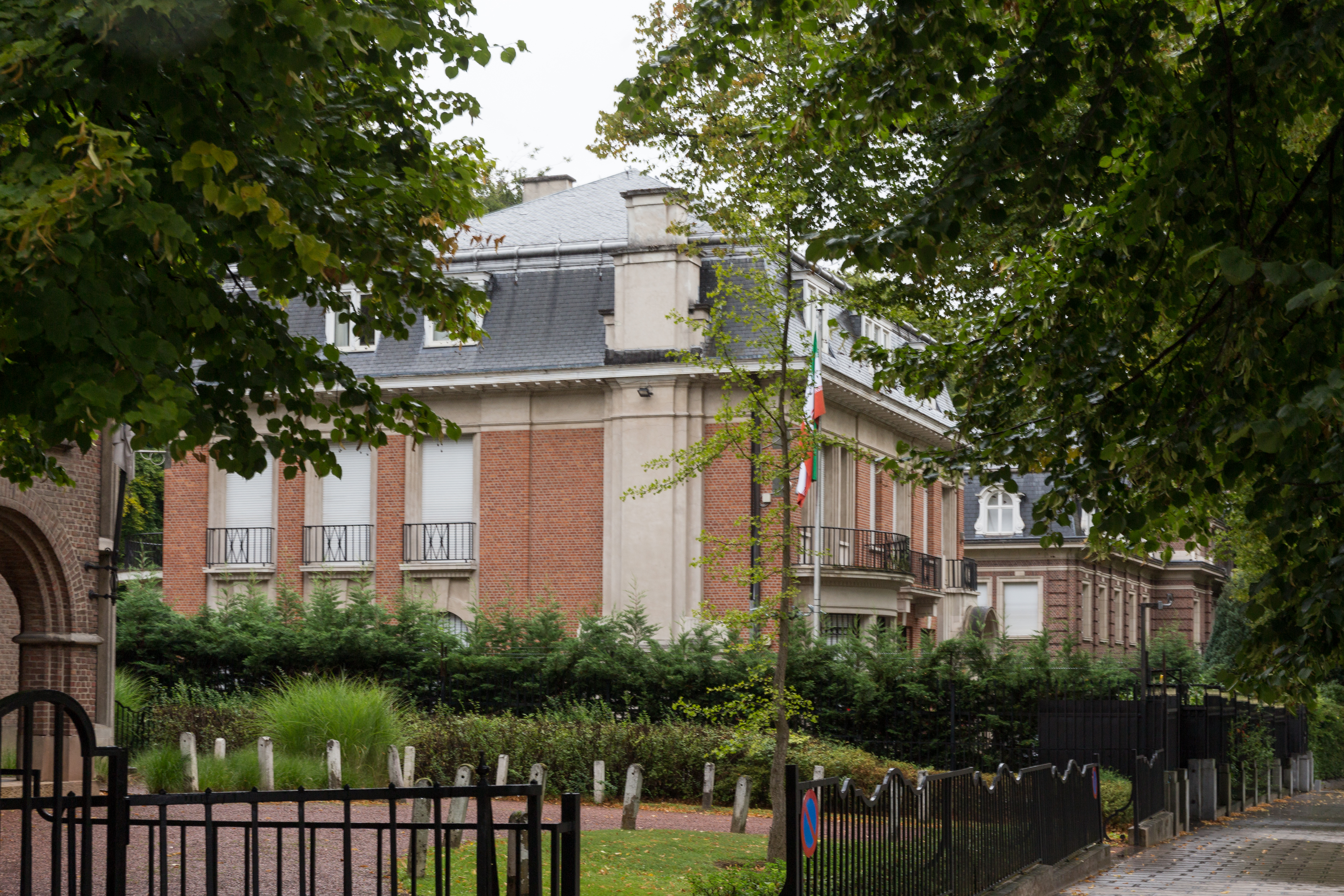
Embassy in Brussels

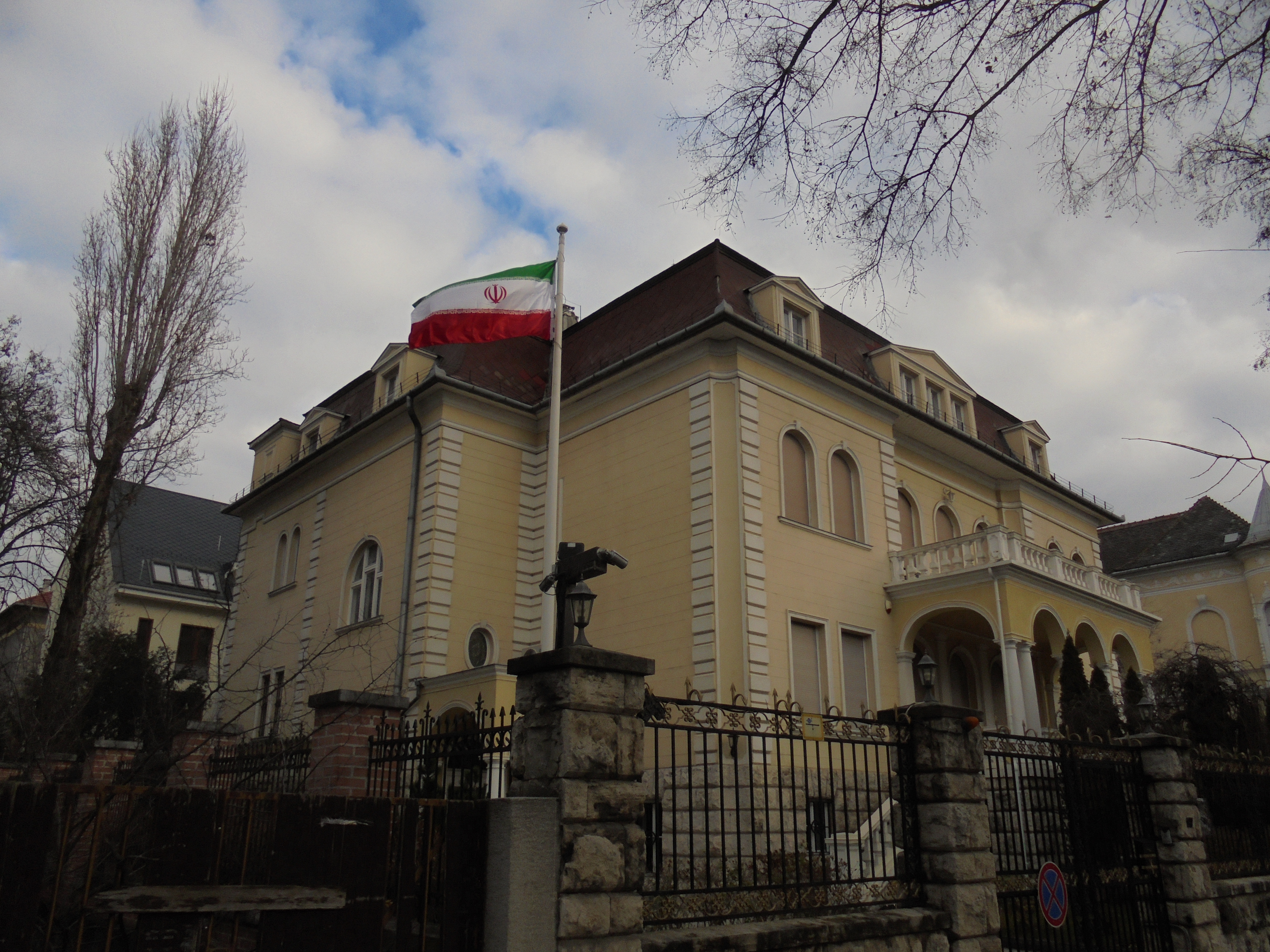
Embassy in Budapest

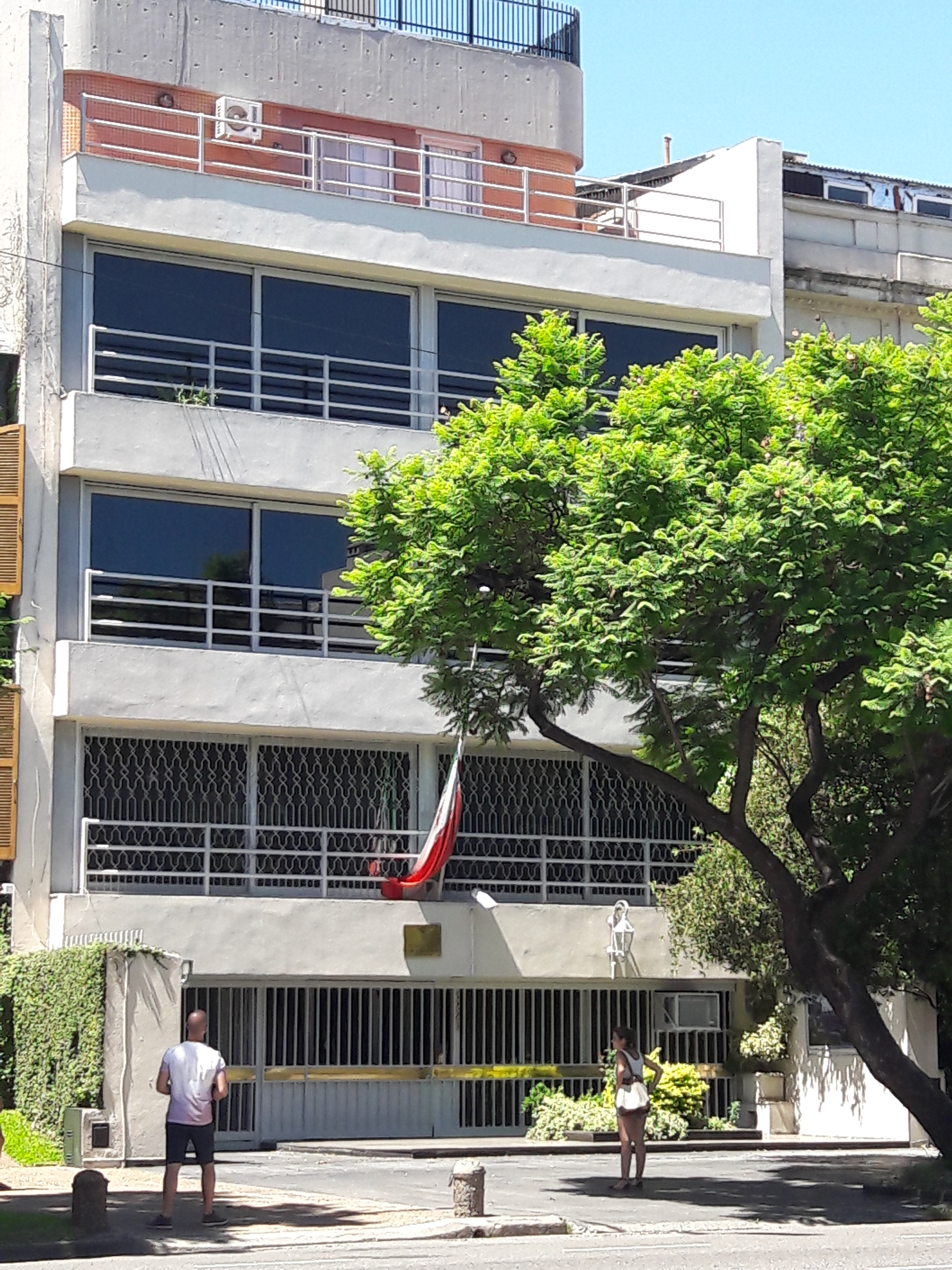
Embassy in Buenos Aires

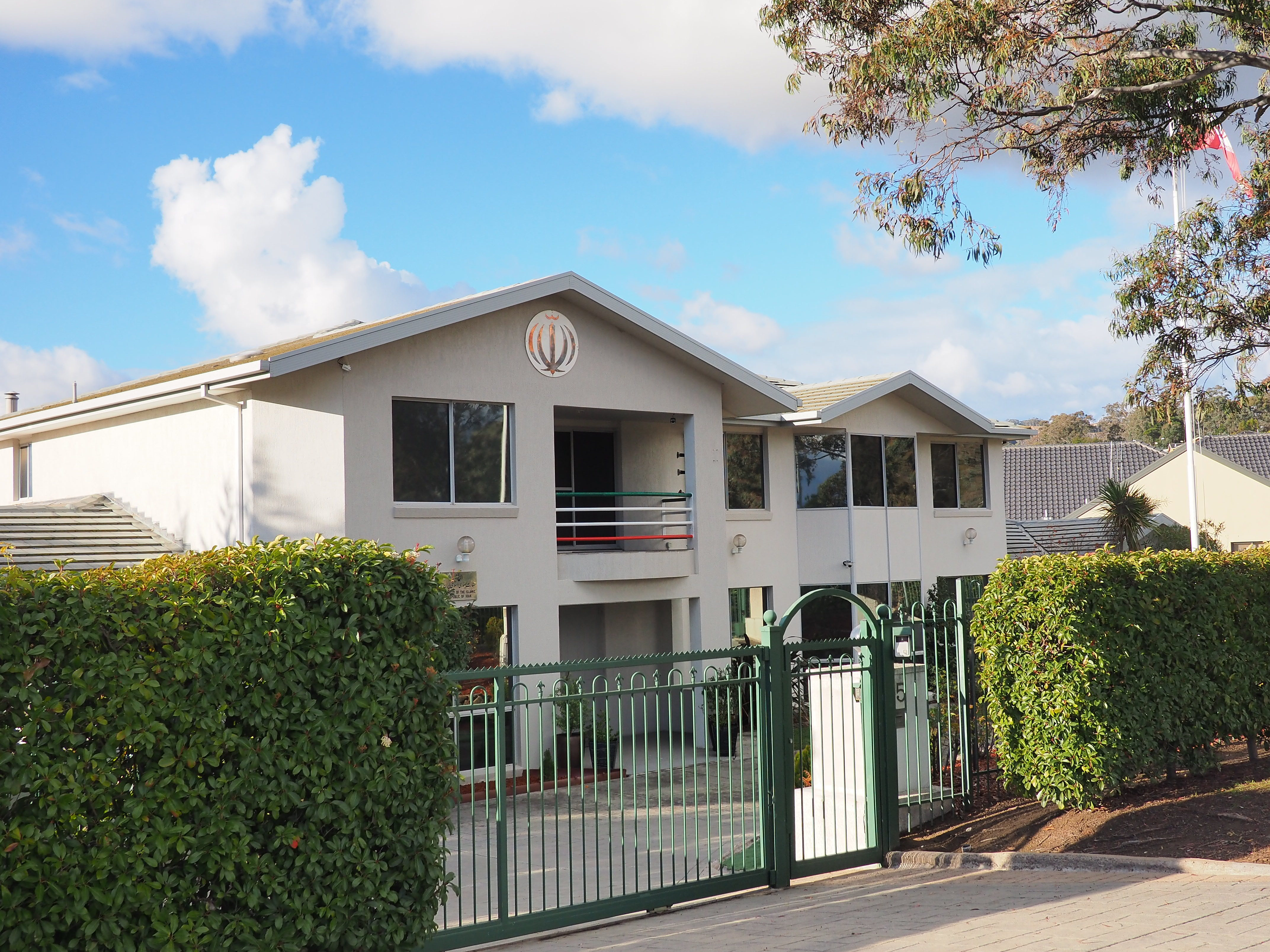
Embassy in Canberra

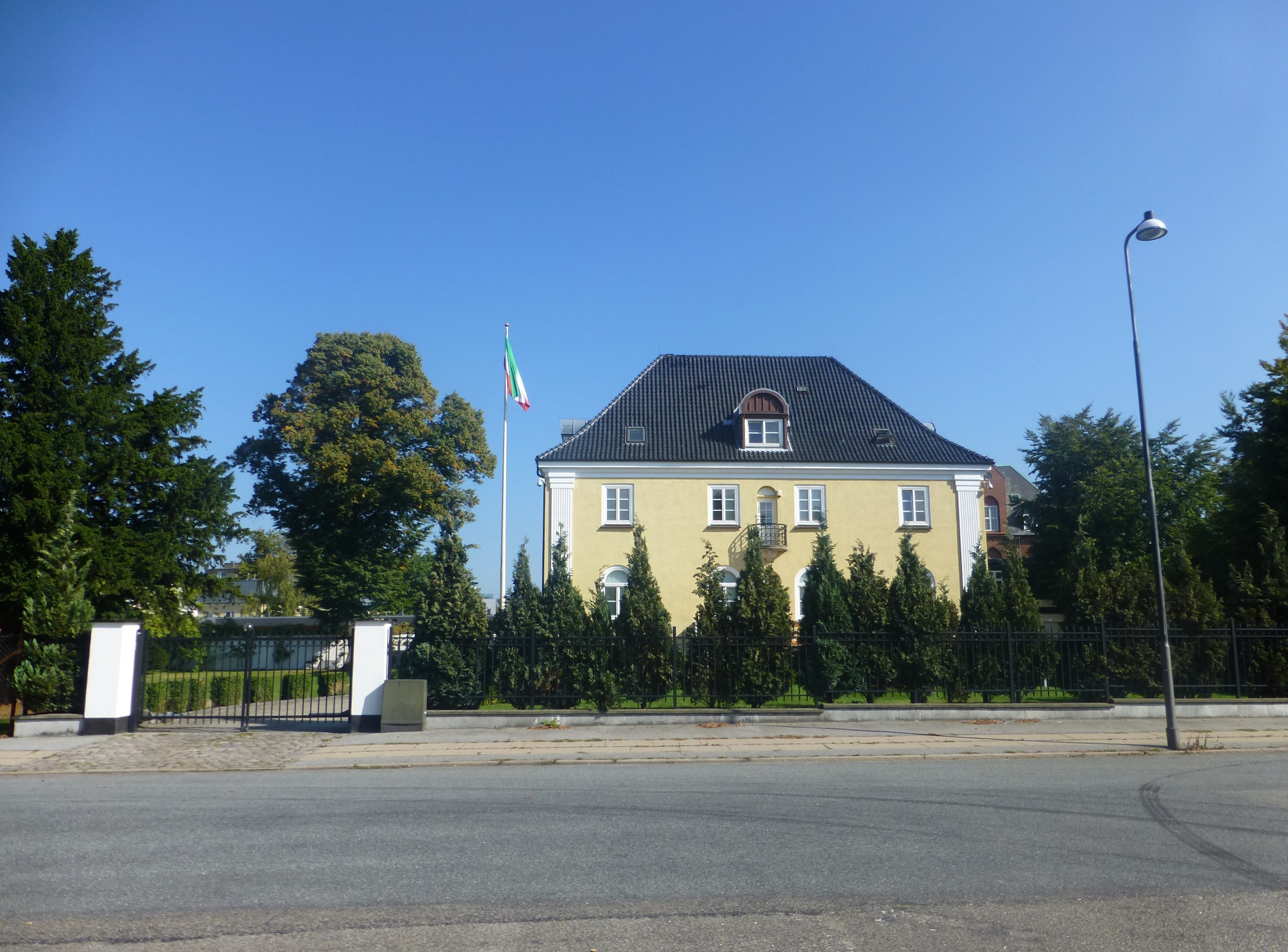
Embassy in Copenhagen

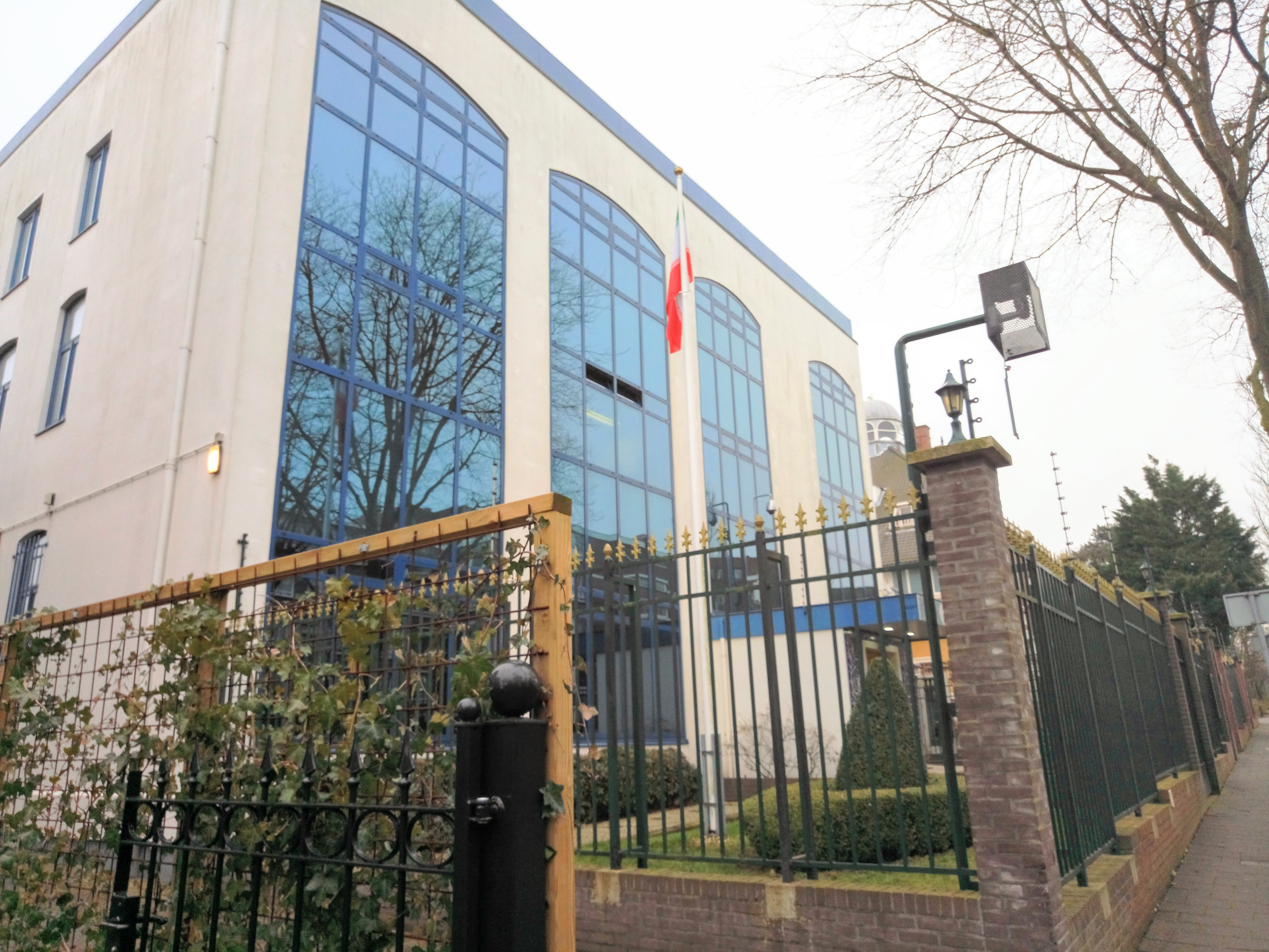
Embassy in The Hague

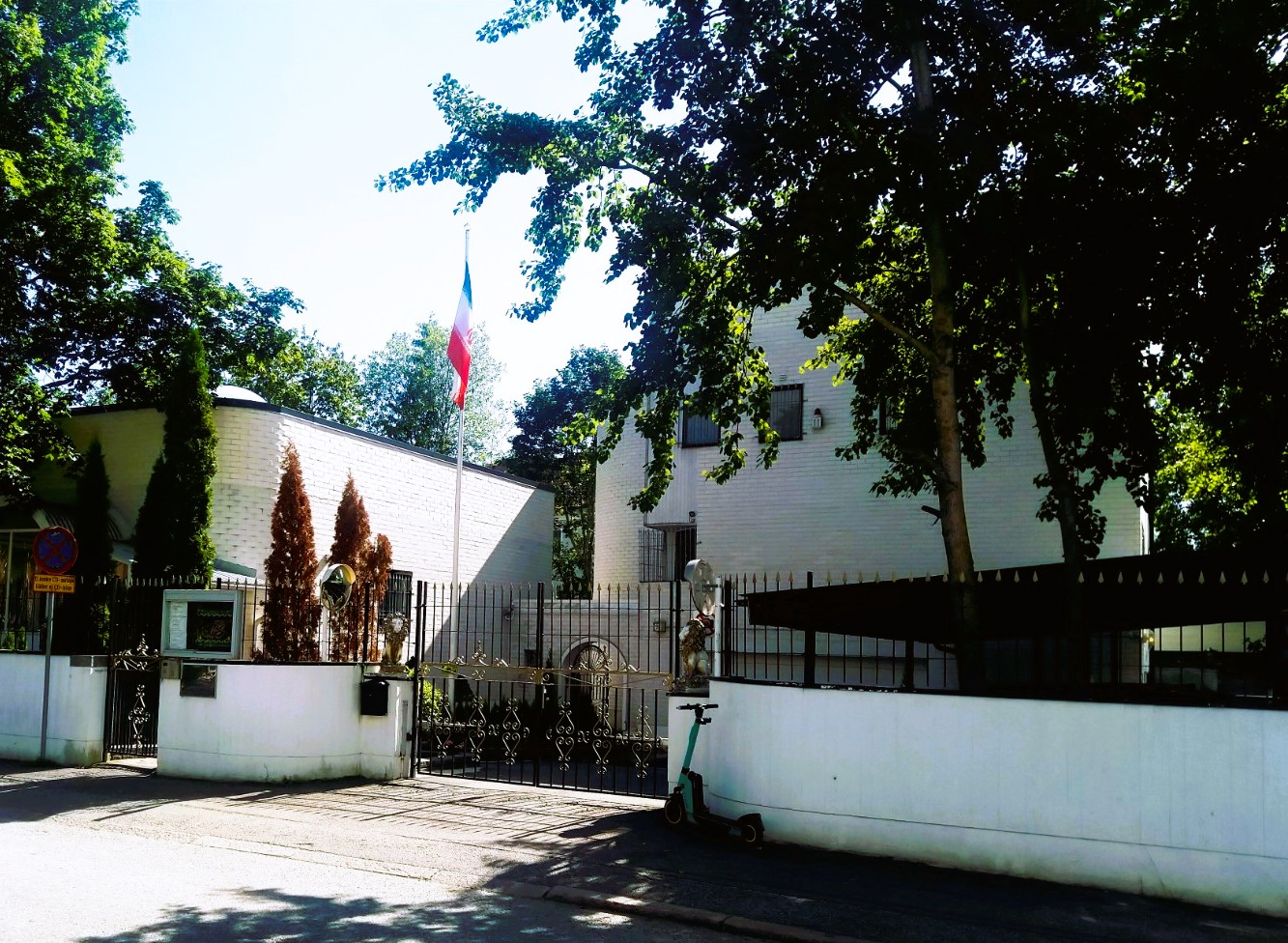
Embassy in Helsinki

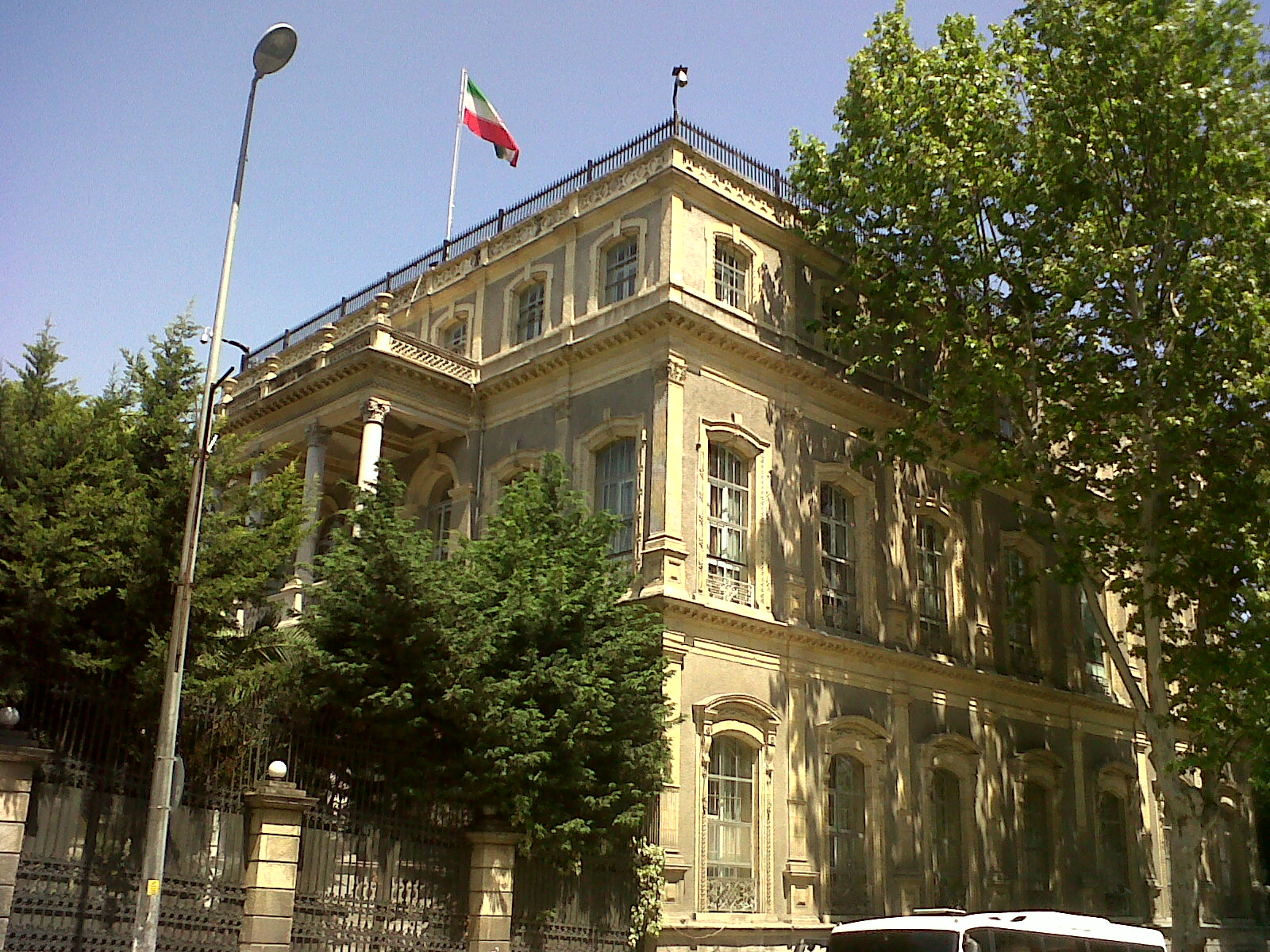
Consulate-General in Istanbul

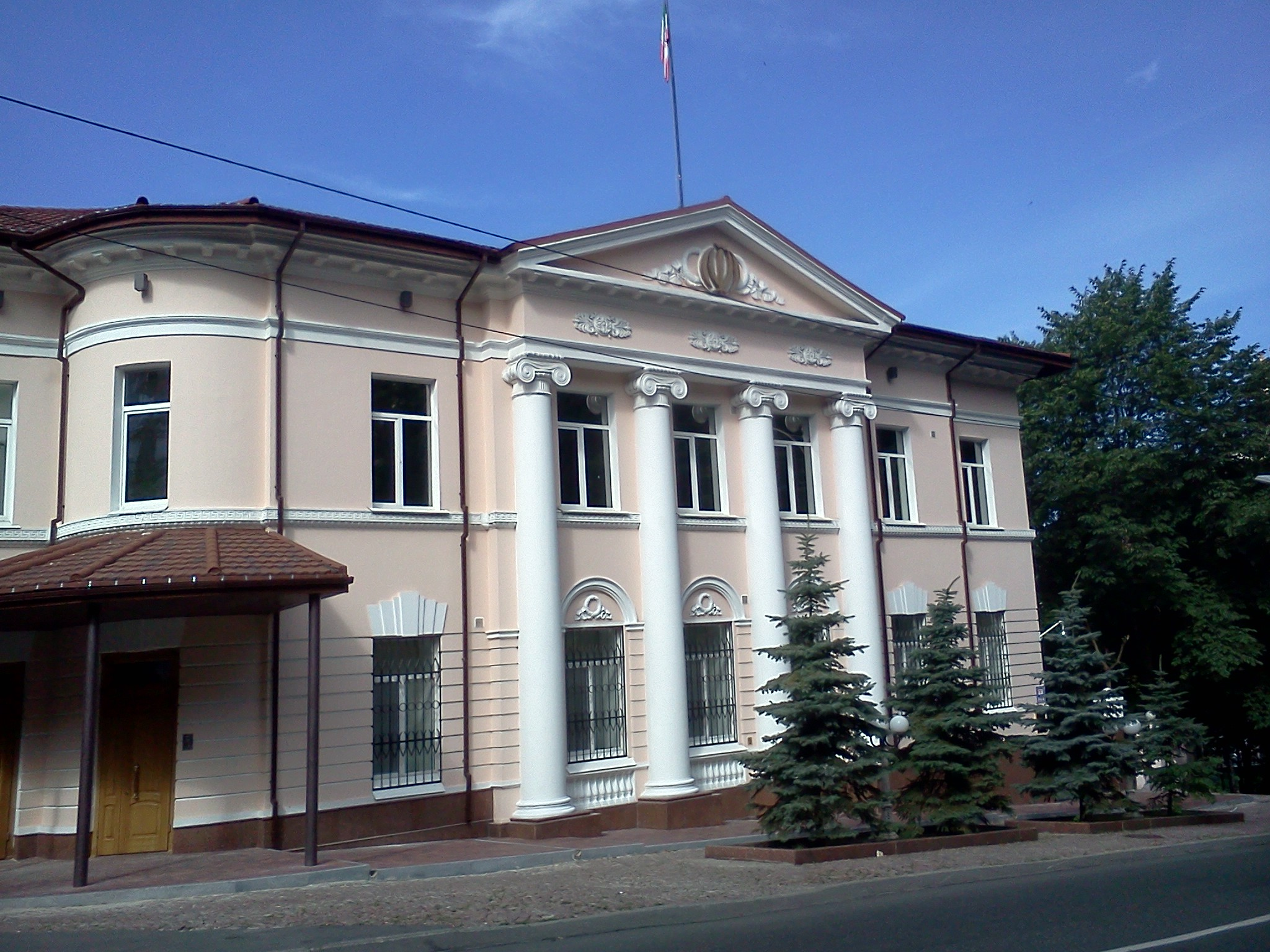
Embassy in Kyiv

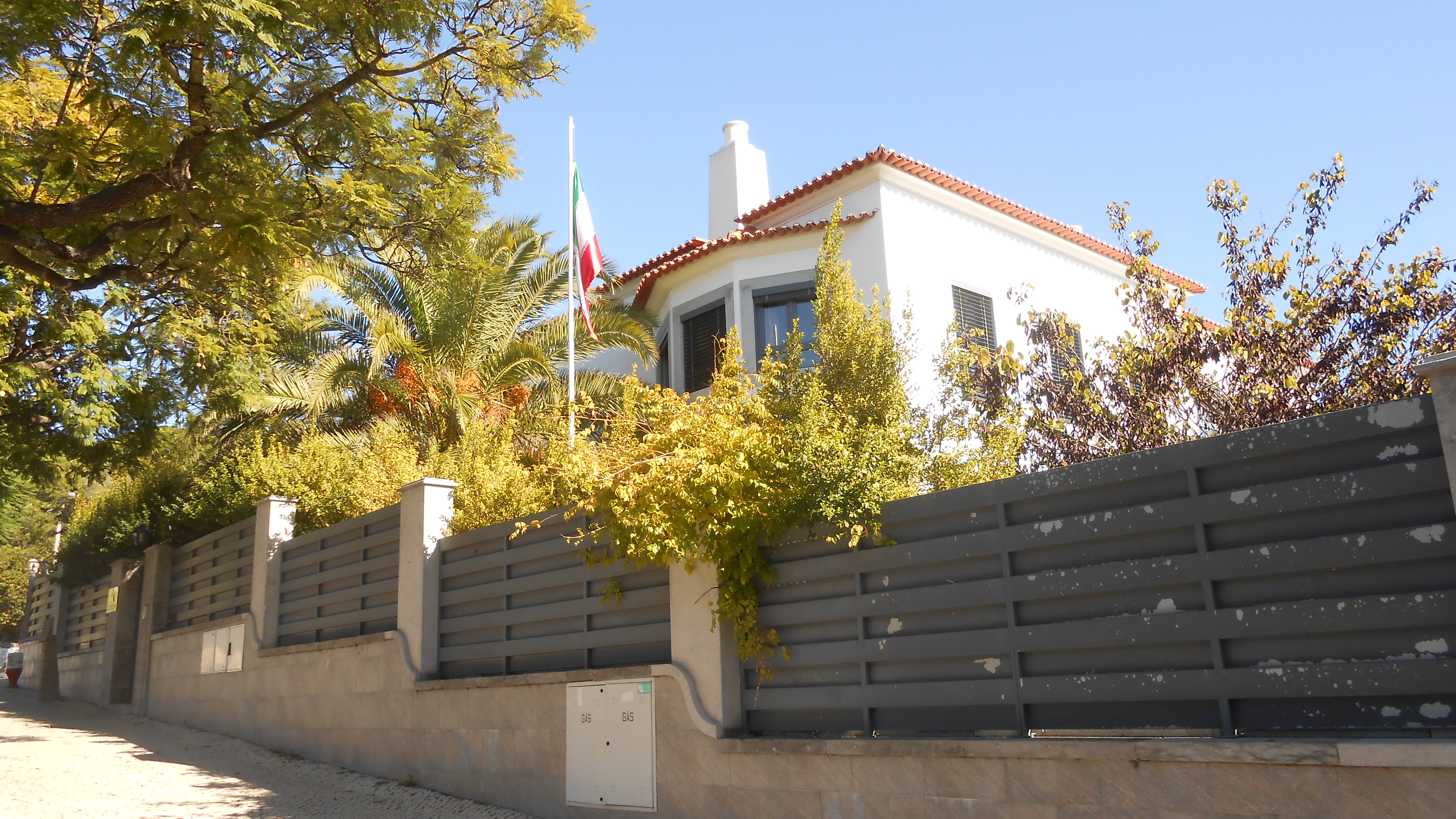
Embassy in Lisbon

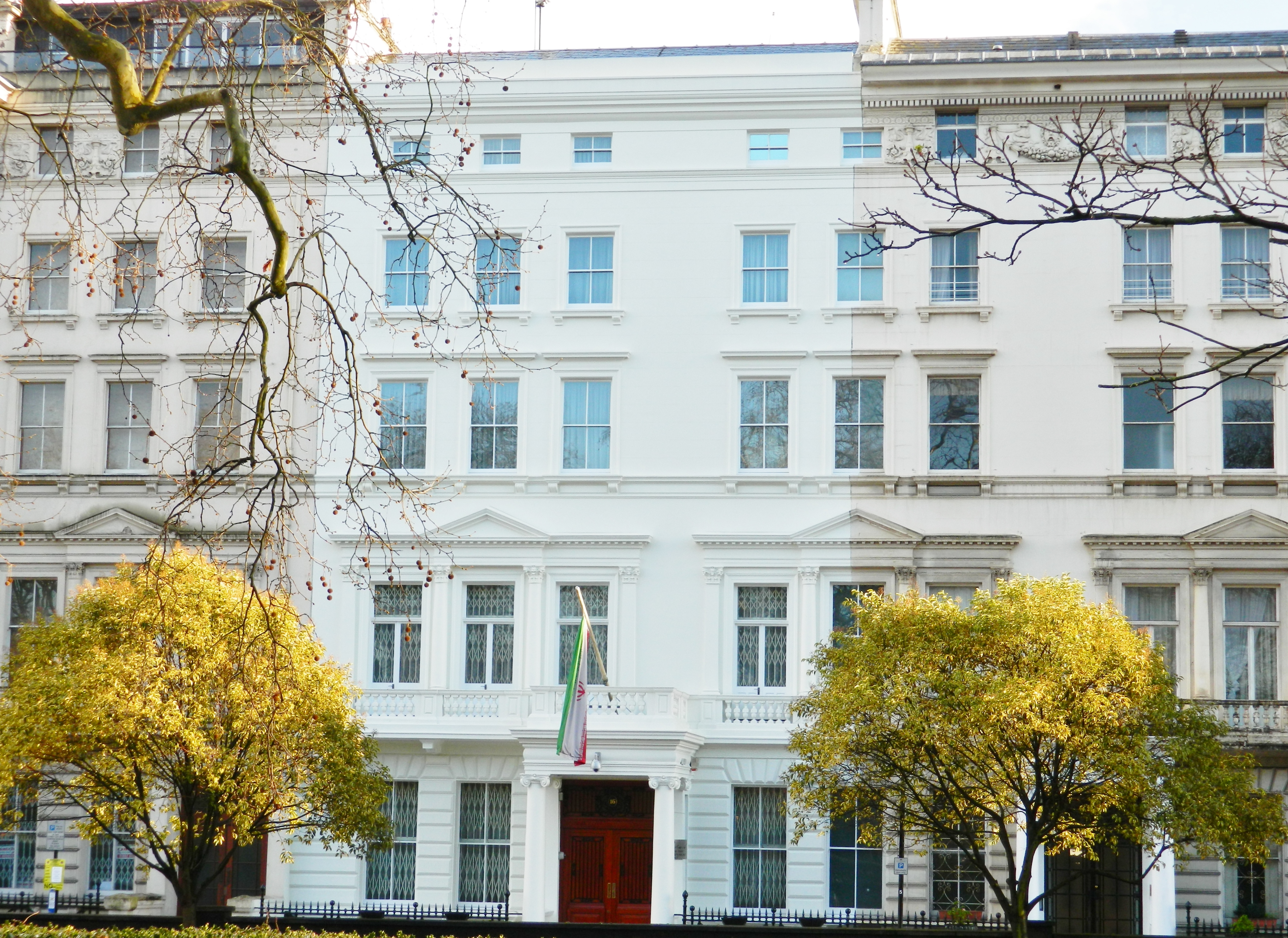
Embassy in London

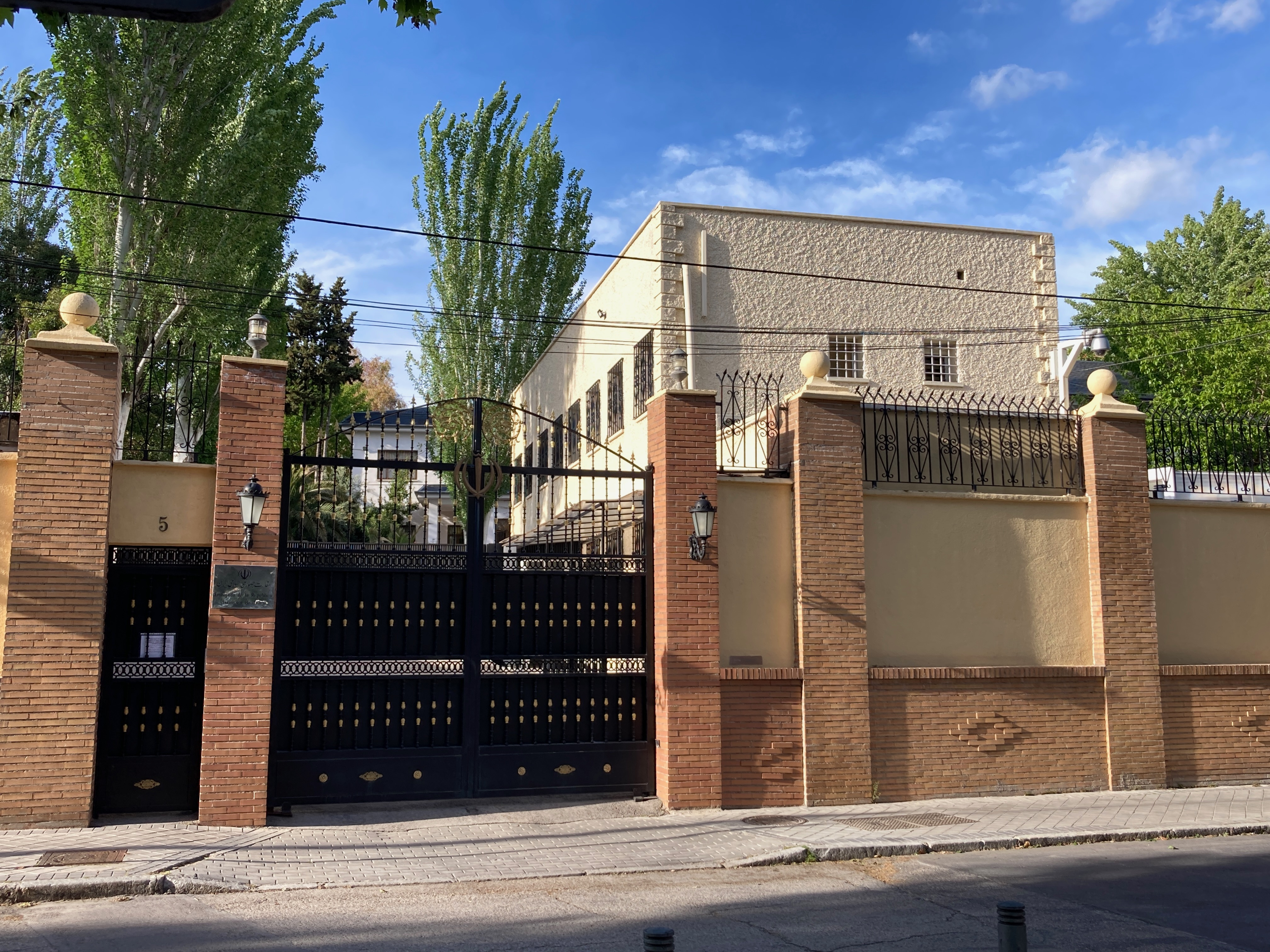
Embassy in Madrid

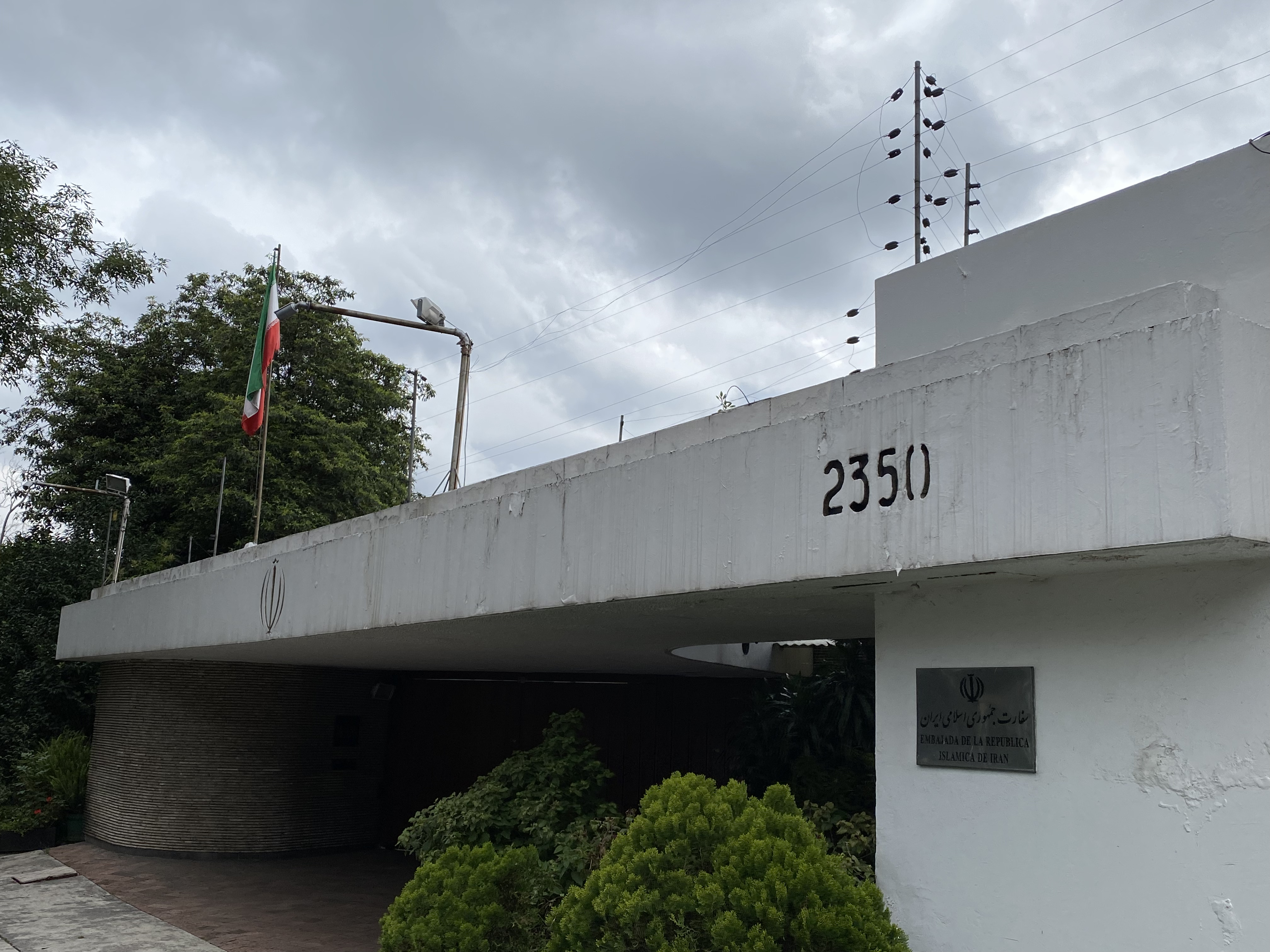
Embassy in Mexico City

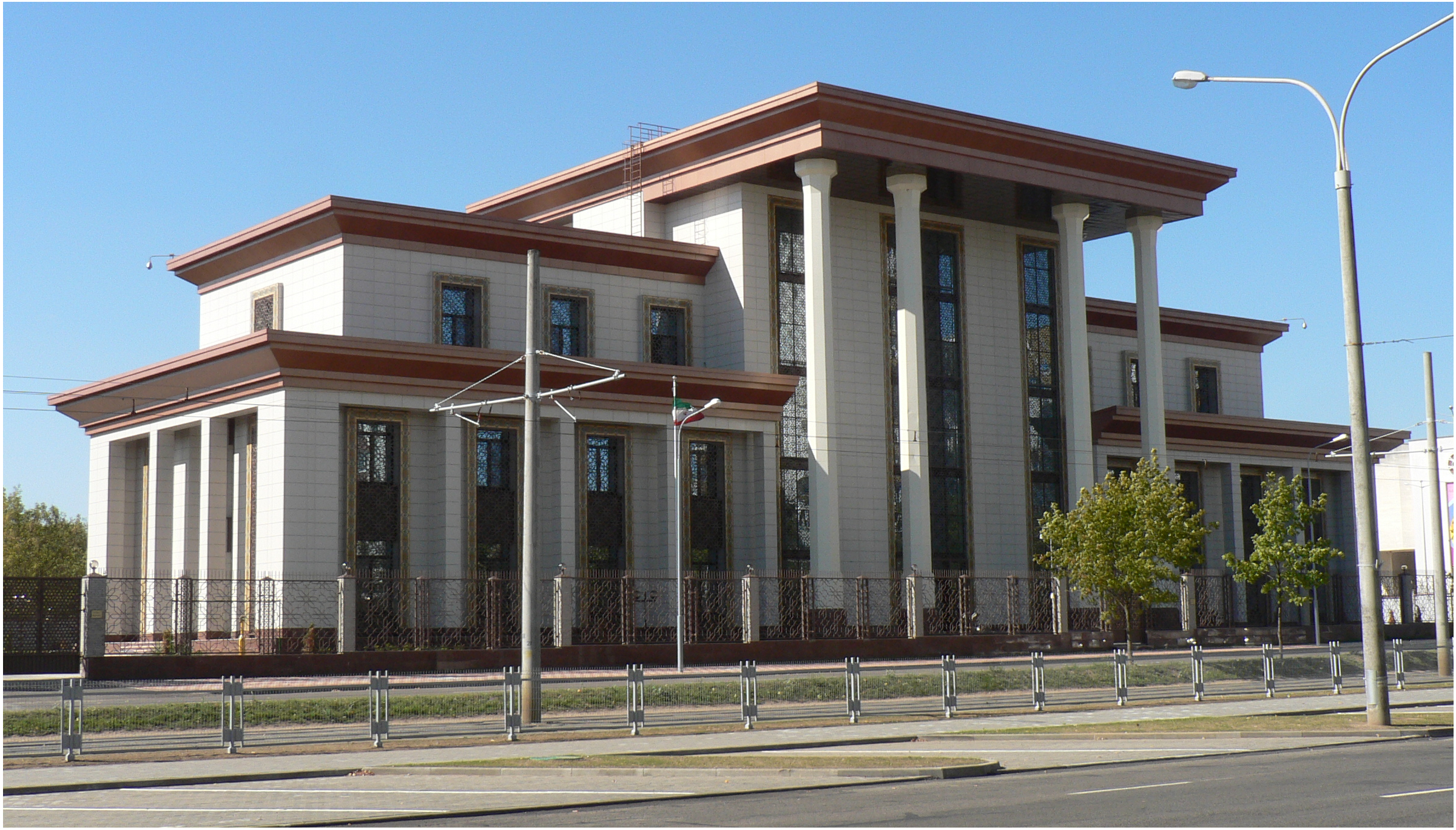
Embassy in Minsk

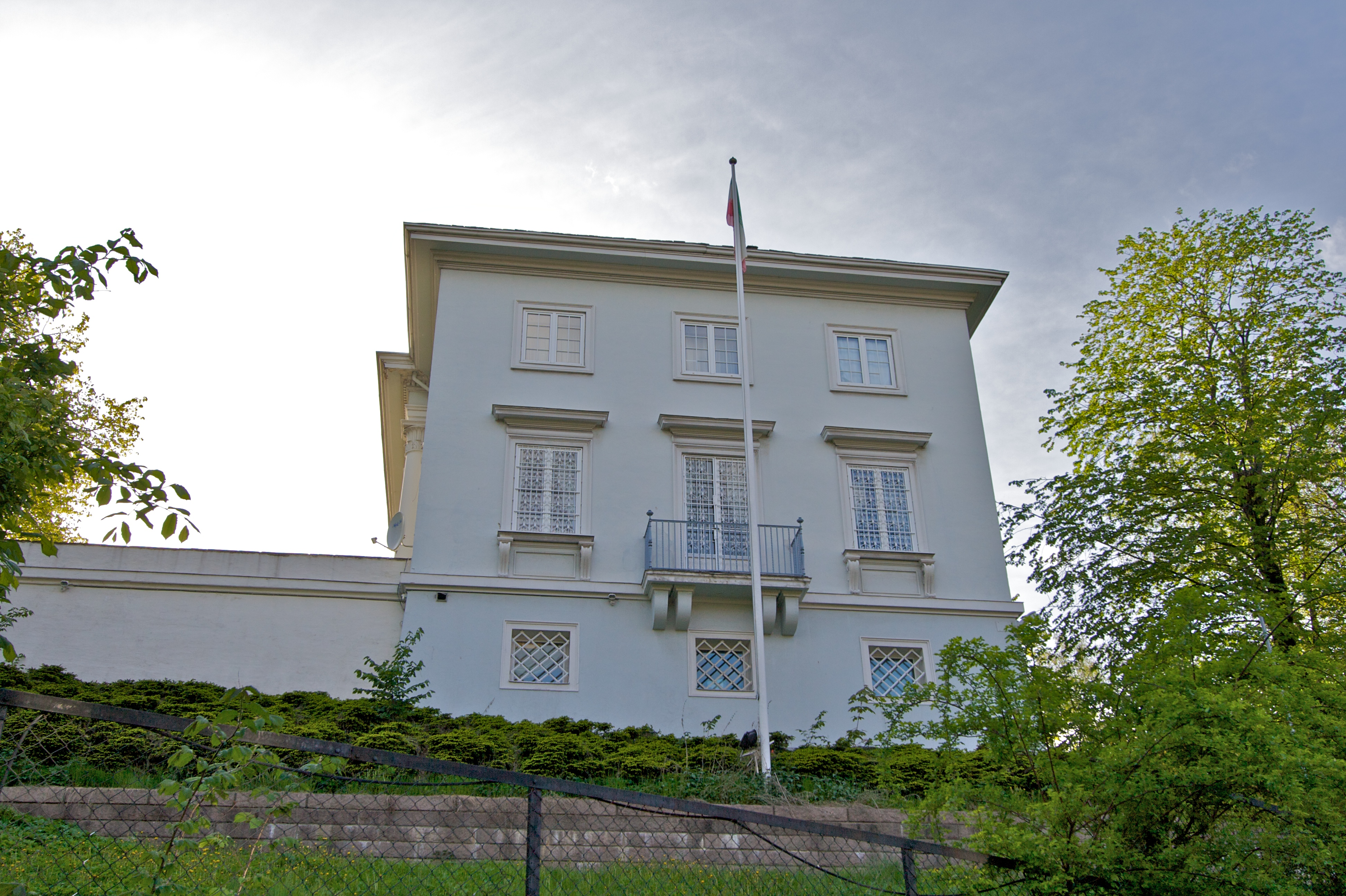
Embassy in Oslo

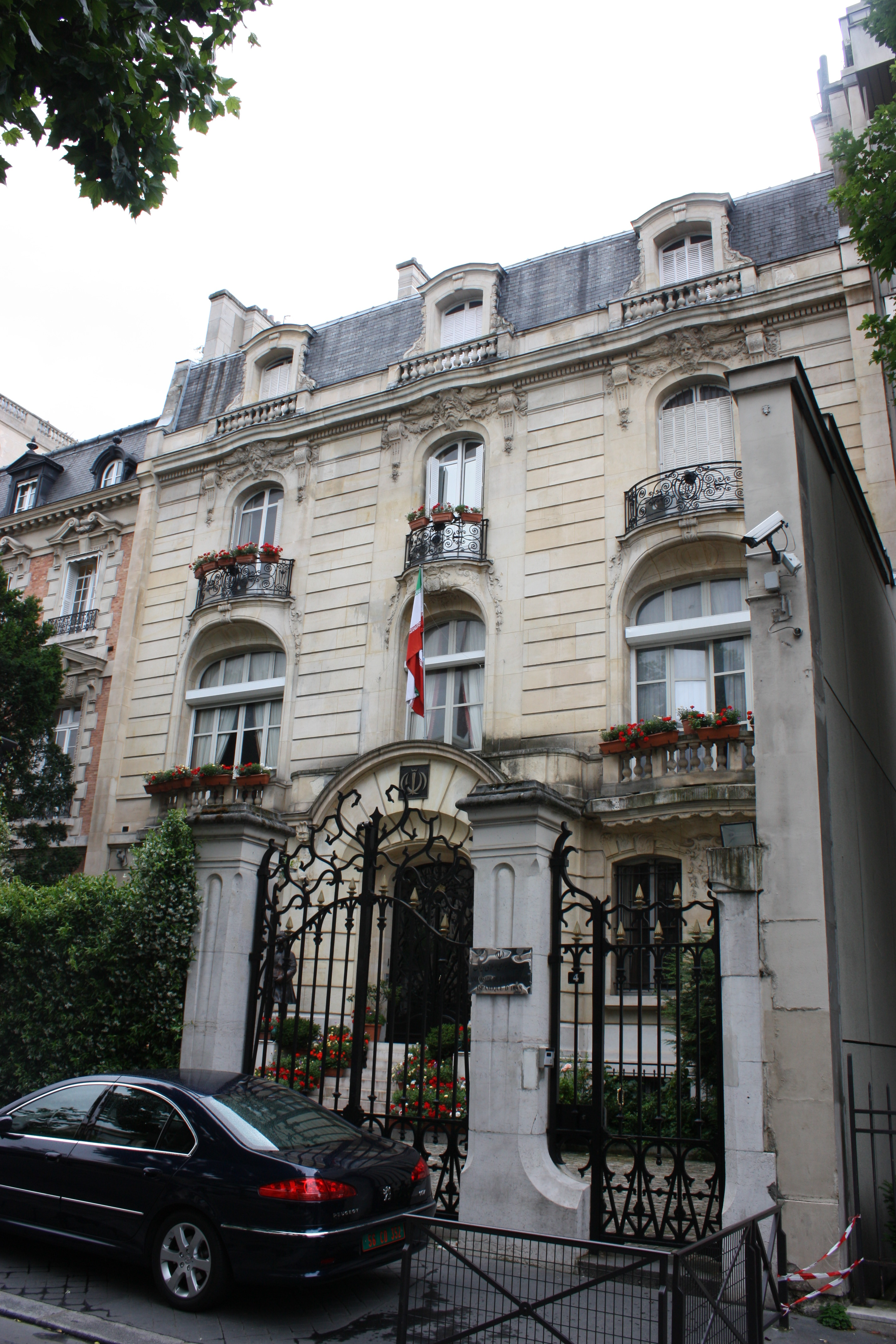
Embassy in Paris

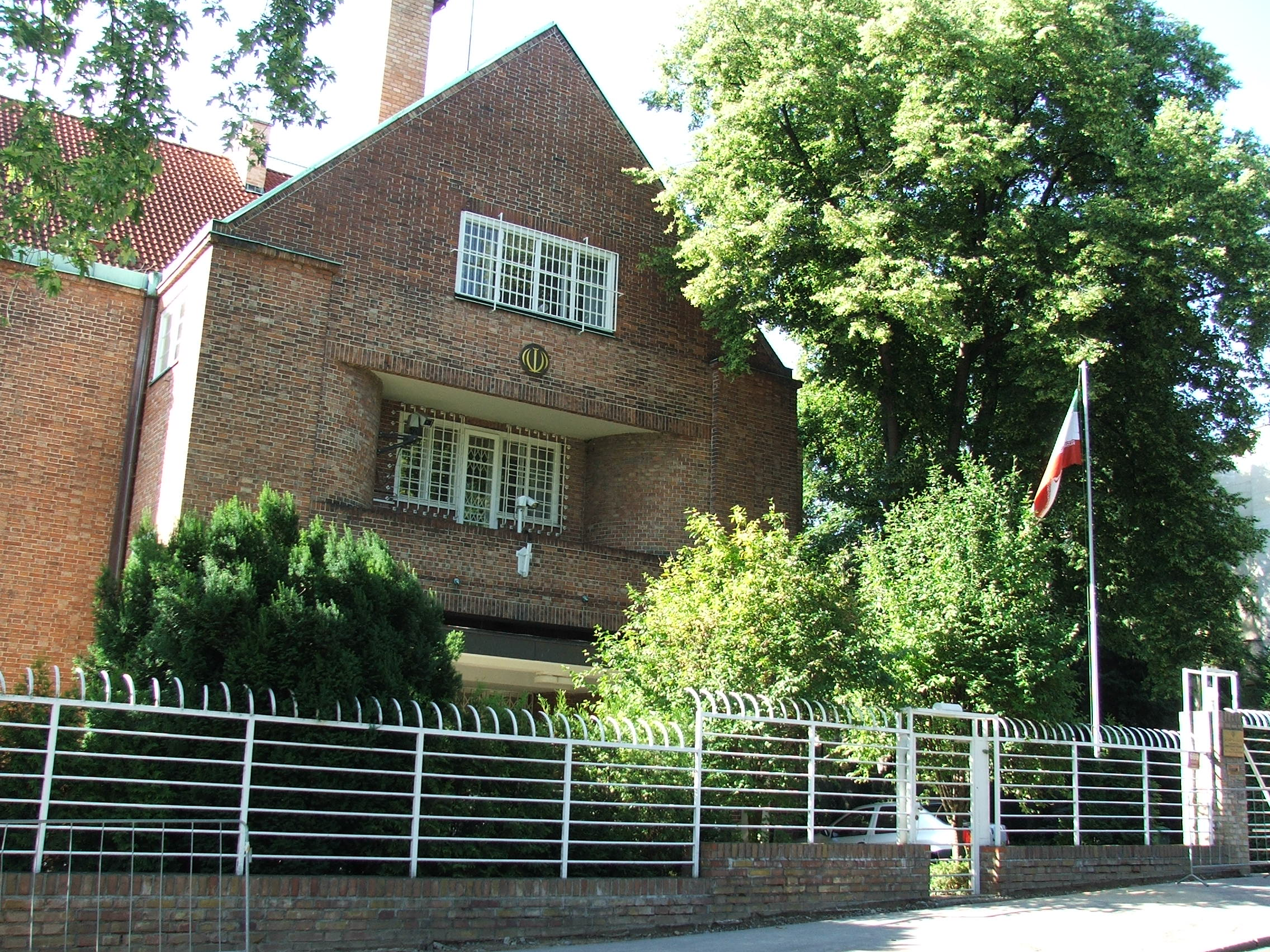
Embassy in Prague

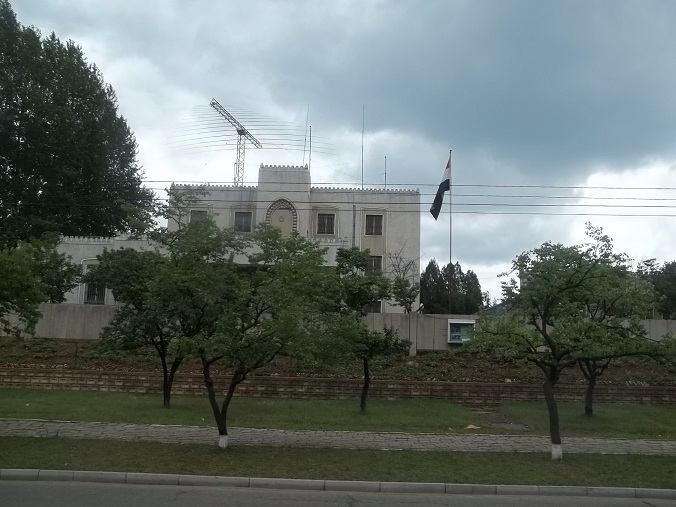
Embassy in Pyongyang

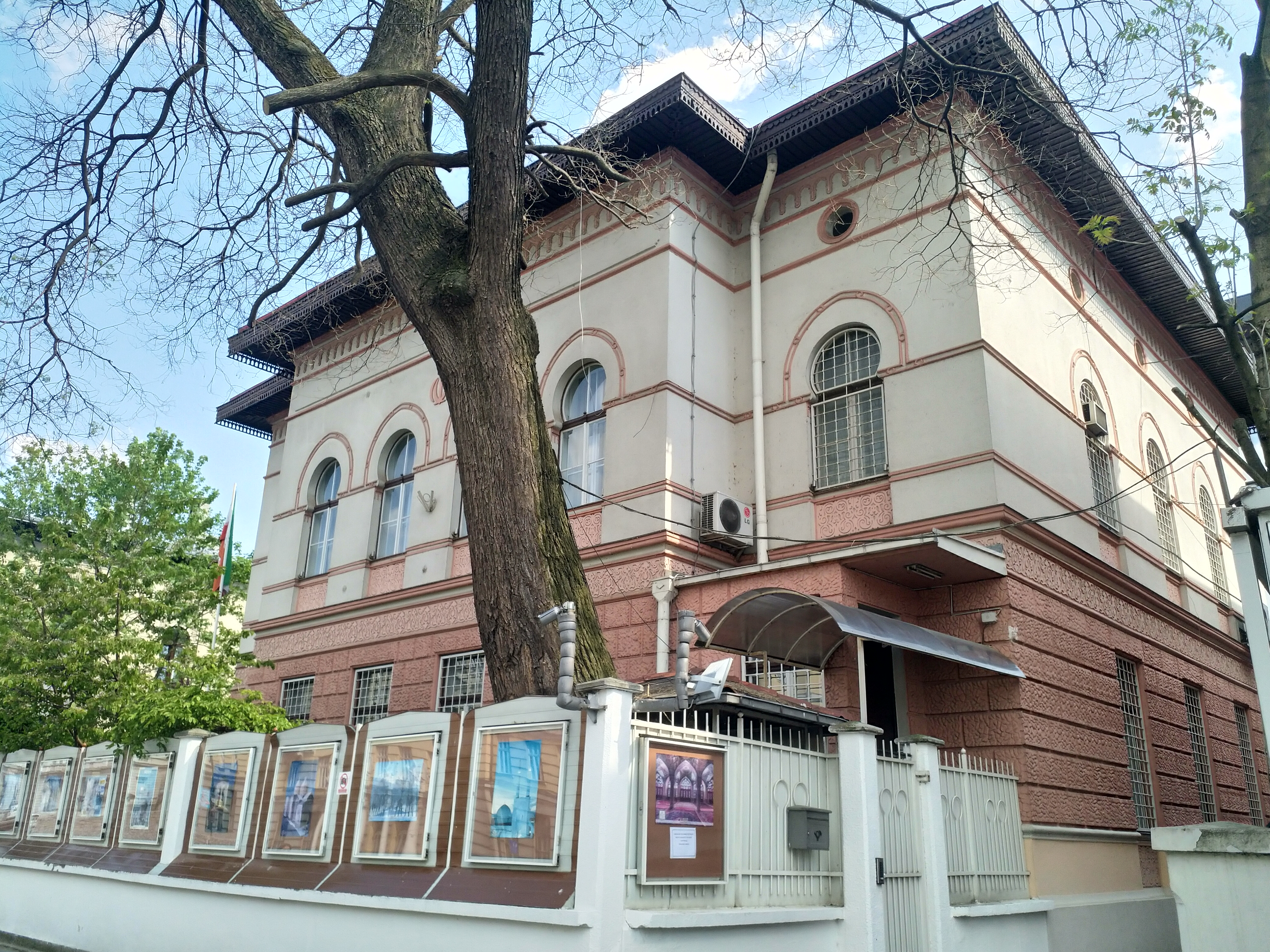
Embassy in Sarajevo

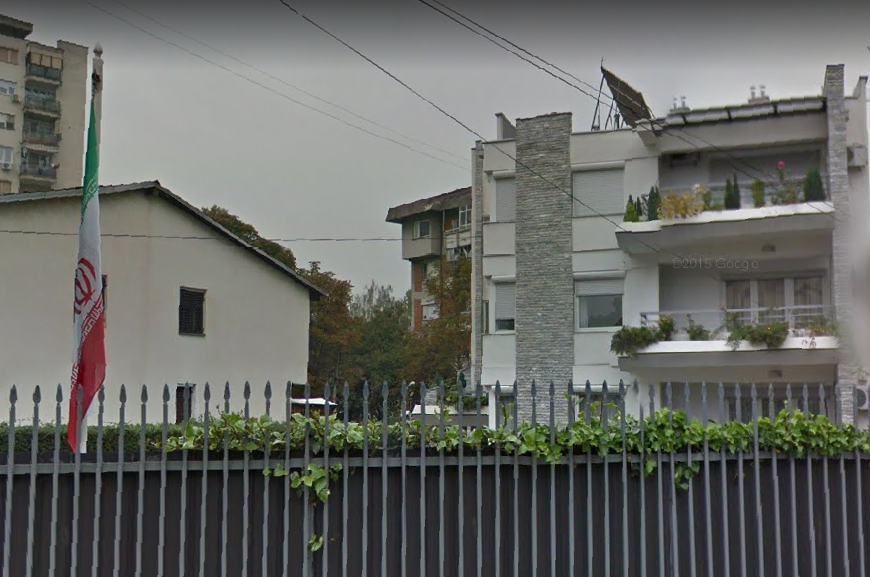
Embassy in Skopje

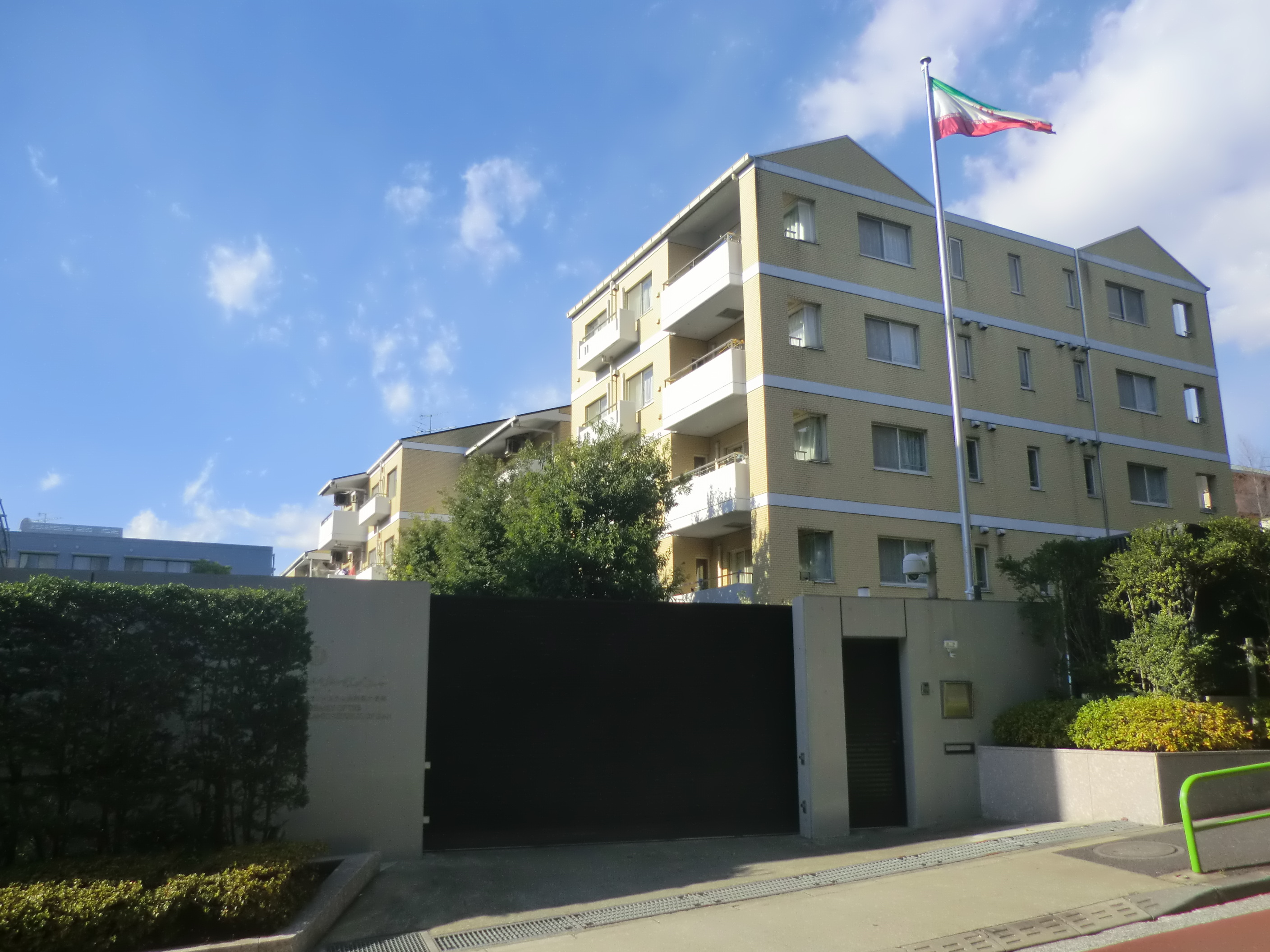
Embassy in Tokyo

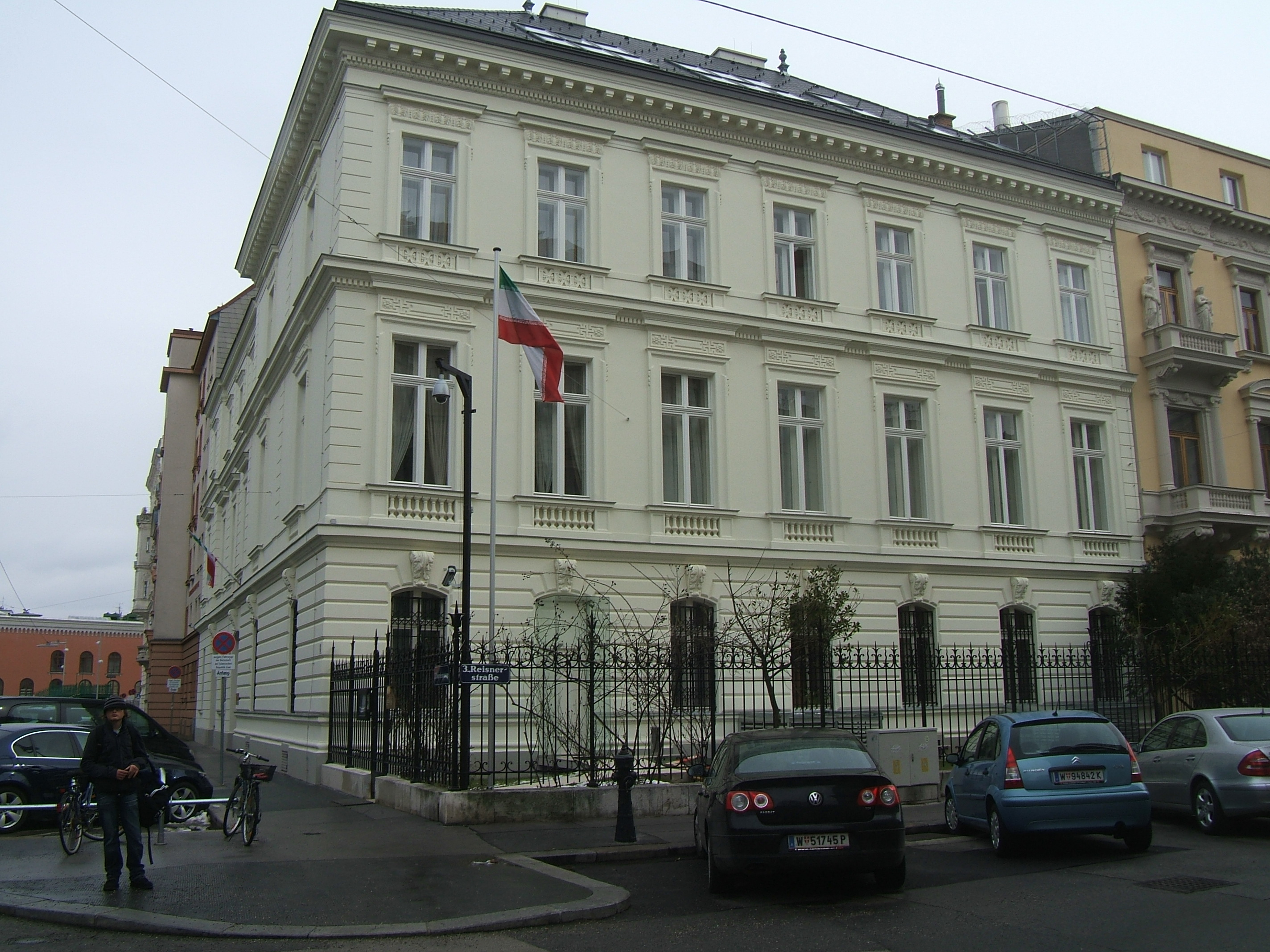
Embassy in Vienna

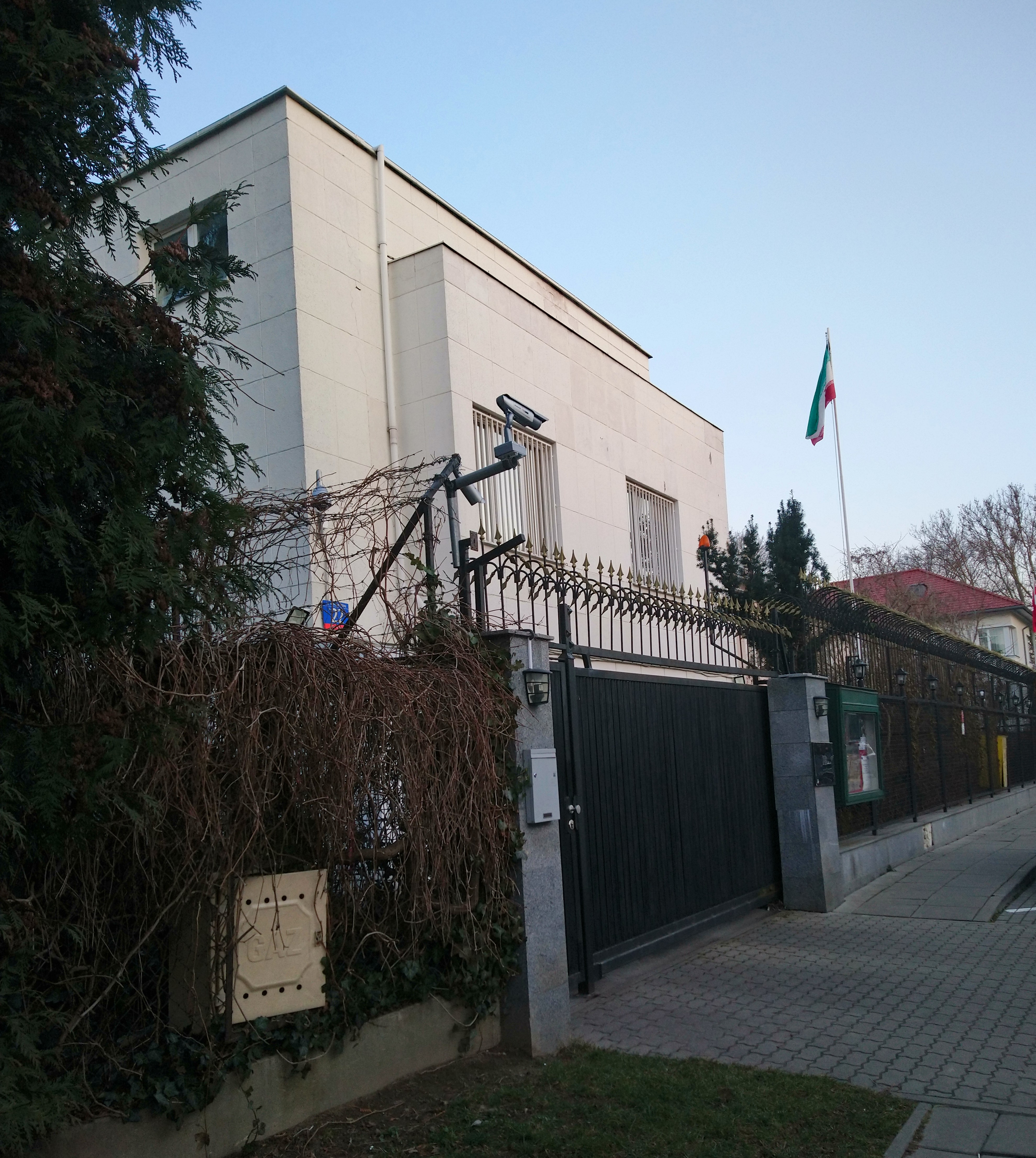
Embassy in Warsaw

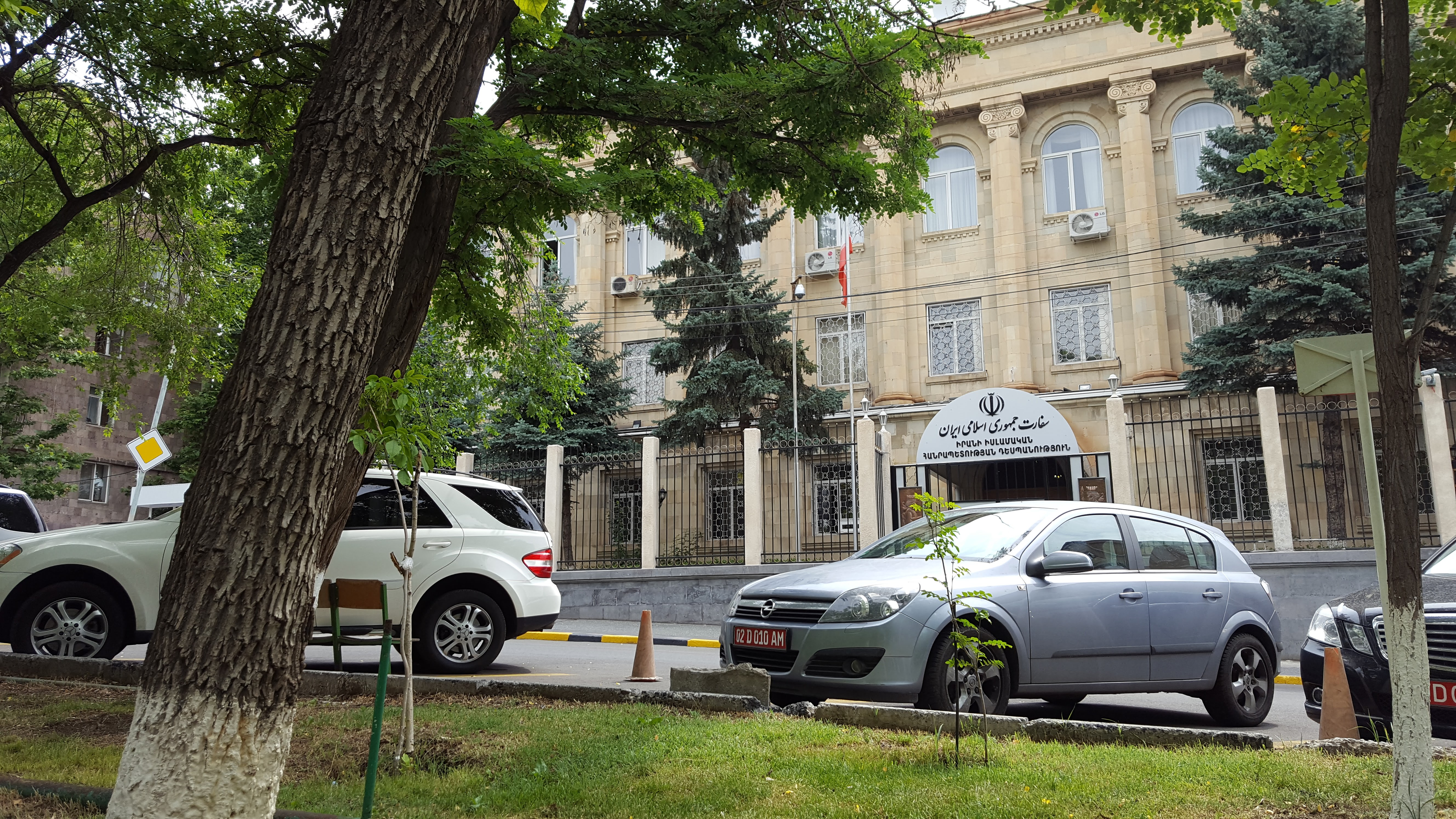
Embassy in Yerevan

== Non-resident embassies ==
1. Bhutan (New Delhi)
2. Guinea-Bissau (Conakry)
3. Central African Republic (Abuja)
4. Zambia (Harare)
5. Botswana (Pretoria)
6. Eswatini (Pretoria)
7. El Salvador (Managua)
8. Honduras (Managua)
9. Costa Rica (Managua)

== Embassies to Open ==
- Angola
- Bahrain
- Cameroon
- Egypt
- Mongolia
- Mozambique
- South Sudan

== Closed missions ==
=== Africa ===
Host country	Host city	Mission	Year closed	Ref.
Comoros	Moroni	Embassy	2016	
Gabon	Libreville	Embassy	Unknown	
Gambia	Banjul	Embassy	Unknown	
Morocco	Rabat	Embassy	2018	
Mozambique	Maputo	Embassy	Unknown	
Somalia	Mogadishu	Embassy	2016	
Zambia	Lusaka	Embassy	Unknown	

=== Americas ===
Host country	Host city	Mission	Year closed	Ref.
Canada	Ottawa	Embassy	2012	
United States	Washington, D.C.	Embassy	1980	
United States	Chicago	Consulate-General	1980	
United States	Houston	Consulate-General	1980	
United States	New York City	Consulate-General	1980	
United States	San Francisco	Consulate-General	1980	

=== Asia ===
Host country	Host city	Mission	Year closed	Ref.
Bahrain	Manama	Embassy	2016	
Syria	Damascus	Embassy	2024	
Syria	Aleppo	Consulate-General	2024	

=== Europe ===
Host country	Host city	Mission	Year closed	Ref.
Albania	Tirana	Embassy	2022	
Germany	Frankfurt	Consulate-General	2024	
Germany	Hamburg	Consulate-General	2024	
Germany	Munich	Consulate-General	2024	

- Colombia
- Egypt
- Israel (Embassy in Jerusalem; closed in 1979 revolution)
- Myanmar
- Sudan
