= Embassy of Iran, Pyongyang =

Embassy in Pyongyang

Coordinates: 39.03591°N 125.78587°E

Embassy of the Islamic Republic of Iran in the Democratic People's Republic of Korea سفارت جمهوری اسلامی ایران در جمهوری دموکراتیک خلق کره
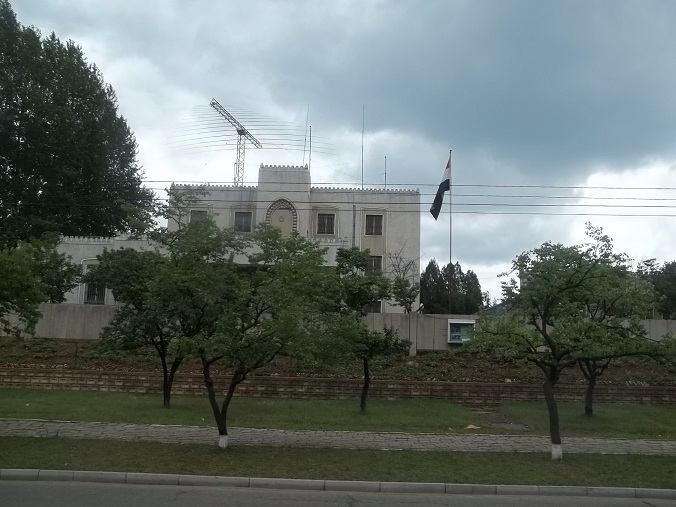
- Location: Munhungdong, Monsu Street, Taedongkang District, Pyongyang
- Opening: 1982
- Ambassador: Seyed Mohsen Emadi

The Embassy of the Islamic Republic of Iran in the Democratic People's Republic of Korea (Persian: سفارت جمهوری اسلامی ایران در جمهوری دموکراتیک خلق کره) is the diplomatic mission of Iran to North Korea. It is located in Munhungdong, Munsu Street, Taedongkang District, Pyongyang. The current ambassador as of 2026 is Abbas Talebi Far.

== History ==
During the Pahlavi era, Iran only had an embassy in South Korea. In 1982, three years after the Islamic Republic of Iran was established, Iran also established an embassy in North Korea.

In 2013, the Ar-Rahman Mosque's construction was completed within the Iranian embassy compound for Iranian Shia Muslim staff.

== See also ==
- List of diplomatic missions of Iran
- List of diplomatic missions in North Korea
- Ar-Rahman Mosque
