= Ar-Rahman Mosque, Pyongyang =

First and only mosque in North Korea

Ar-Rahman Mosque
- 마스지드 알라흐만
- Location of the mosque in North Korea

Religion
- Affiliation: Shia Islam
- Ecclesiastical or organizational status: Mosque
- Status: Active

Location
- Location: Iranian embassy, Pyongyang
- Country: North Korea
- Interactive map of Ar-Rahman Mosque
- Coordinates: 39°02′10″N 125°47′09″E

Architecture
- Type: Mosque architecture
- Style: Iranian architecture
- Funded by: Government of Iran

The Ar-Rahman Mosque (Korean: 마스지드 알라흐만; MR: maseujideu allaheuman; Persian: مسجد الرحمن, romanized: masjid ar-rahman, lit. 'Mosque of the Merciful One') is a mosque in Pyongyang, North Korea. The mosque is situated on the grounds of the Iranian embassy, and is considered the country's first and only mosque.

== Overview ==
Embassy staff from other Islamic countries in North Korea, including Sunnis, visit the mosque for worship. The mosque hosts Friday prayers attended by Muslim embassy staff from various countries regardless of sect. The mosque has hosted high-profile guests such as Ali Khamenei, who visited in May 1989. In 2020, staff from multiple embassies in Pyongyang gathered at the Ar-Rahman Mosque to celebrate Eid al-Fitr.

Though other Islamic-majority nations, including Egypt, Palestine and Syria, maintain embassies in North Korea, none of these embassies are known to have mosques on their premises. This lack of mosques in North Korea is attributed to the state's religious policies, and it distinguishes North Korea as one of the only countries with a Shia mosque and no Sunni mosques, along with Armenia (which also has only one mosque, the Blue Mosque in Yerevan).

== See also ==
- Islam in Korea
- Religion in North Korea
- List of mosques in Asia
