= History of the nuclear program of Iran =

Iran's nuclear program began under Shah Mohammad Reza Pahlavi in the 1950s as part of the U.S. Atoms for Peace initiative. In 1967, Iran established the Tehran Nuclear Research Center with a U.S.-supplied 5 MW research reactor. During the 1970s, Iran pursued ambitious plans for up to 20 nuclear power plants (starting the Bushehr reactors with German assistance), but progress halted after the 1979 Islamic Revolution and the Iran–Iraq War. Iraq's use of chemical weapons during that war influenced Iran's post-revolution leaders to secretly revive a weapons-related nuclear program in the mid-1980s. By the 1990s, Iran was rebuilding its nuclear infrastructure: it sought a nuclear fuel cycle (mining, conversion, enrichment) and covertly obtained centrifuge designs from the Pakistani Abdul Qadeer Khan network. Construction of the Bushehr 1000 MWe power reactor resumed with Russian help and was completed in 2011 under IAEA safeguards.

Iran's nuclear activities remained mostly clandestine until 2002, when dissidents revealed undeclared facilities at Natanz (uranium enrichment) and Arak (heavy water reactor). This sparked an international crisis. Under pressure, Iran agreed in late 2003 to suspend enrichment and signed the IAEA Additional Protocol, amid an EU-3 (UK, France, Germany) negotiation effort. However, these voluntary limits collapsed after the election of Mahmoud Ahmadinejad in 2005, and Iran resumed enrichment, leading the IAEA Board of Governors to find Iran in non-compliance and the United Nations Security Council to impose sanctions starting in 2006. Throughout the late 2000s, Tehran steadily expanded its enrichment capacity, including the secret construction of the Fordow underground enrichment plant, revealed in 2009, and accumulated low-enriched uranium, at one point reducing its estimated nuclear breakout time to a few months. Covert actions sought to slow Iran's progress (for example, the Stuxnet cyber-attack in 2010 targeted Iran's centrifuges), but the program continued to advance.

A diplomatic breakthrough came in 2015, when Iran and the P5+1 (US, UK, France, China, Russia, and Germany) reached the Joint Comprehensive Plan of Action (JCPOA). This agreement imposed strict limits on Iran's nuclear program, capping uranium enrichment at 3.67% U-235, shrinking Iran's enriched uranium stockpile to 300 kg, and requiring the Arak heavy-water reactor to be redesigned, in exchange for broad sanctions relief. The JCPOA was implemented in 2016 with the IAEA verifying Iran's compliance. However, in May 2018 the United States unilaterally withdrew from the accord, citing Iran's missile program, support of proxies, and aggressive regional policies; US sanctions were reimposed, and Iran responded from 2019 onward by violating JCPOA limits. By 2020–2021, Iran ended its enrichment restraint and began enriching to higher levels than allowed. As of 2025, Iran's nuclear program is far more advanced than a decade earlier, having expanded significantly in both scope and scale. In June 2025, the International Atomic Energy Agency (IAEA) found Iran non-compliant with its nuclear obligations for the first time in 20 years. Iran retaliated by launching a new enrichment site and installing advanced centrifuges.

== History ==
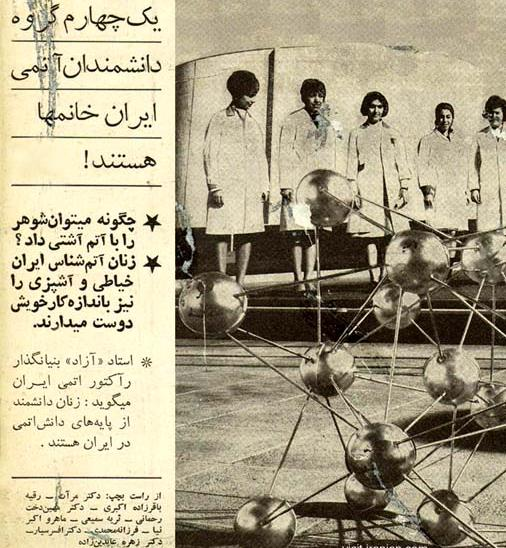
An Iranian newspaper clip from 1968 reads: "A quarter of Iran's Nuclear Energy scientists are women." The photograph shows some female Iranian PhDs posing in front of Tehran's research reactor.

=== 1950s–1960s ===
Iran's nuclear program was launched in the 1950s with the help of the United States. On 5 March 1957, a "proposed agreement for cooperation in research in the peaceful uses of atomic energy" was announced under the Eisenhower administration's Atoms for Peace program.

In 1967, the Tehran Nuclear Research Center (TNRC) was established, run by the Atomic Energy Organization of Iran (AEOI). The center consists of 11 departments that conduct research on most aspects of the nuclear fuel cycle, including departments for nuclear physics, isotope production, reactor research, analytical chemistry, nuclear electronics and fusion. The TNRC was equipped with a 5-megawatt nuclear research reactor supplied by US company American Machine and Foundry, which was fueled by highly enriched uranium.

In 1968, Iran signed the Nuclear Non-Proliferation Treaty (NPT). Iran ratified it in 1970, making Iran's nuclear program subject to IAEA verification.

A Central Treaty Organization nuclear sciences institute was moved from Baghdad to Tehran after Iraq left CENTO.

The participation of the United States and Western European governments in Iran's nuclear program continued until the 1979 Iranian Revolution that toppled the last Shah of Iran. Following the Revolution, most of the international nuclear cooperation with Iran was cut off. In 1981, Iranian officials concluded that Iran's nuclear development should continue. Negotiations took place with France in the late 1980s and with Argentina in the early 1990s, and agreements were reached. In the 1990s, Russia formed a joint research organization with Iran, providing Iran with Russian nuclear experts and technical information.

=== 1970s ===
The Shah summoned Akbar Etemad, a trained nuclear physicist, to the royal court in 1973, told him of his desire to launch a nuclear program, and asked Etemad to develop a master plan. Two weeks later, the shah met with Etemad again. He read the 13-page draft document Etemad had prepared, then turned to the prime minister and ordered him to undertake necessary actions to implement the plan. Thus, was launched Iran's nuclear program.

The Shah approved plans to construct up to 23 nuclear power stations by 2000. In March 1974, the Shah envisioned a time when the world's oil supply would run out, and declared, "Petroleum is a noble material, much too valuable to burn ... We envision producing, as soon as possible, 23,000 megawatts of electricity using nuclear plants."

In an interview released June 23, 1974 by the French weekly Les Informations, Mohammad Reza Shah, replying to the question whether Iran would one day possess a nuclear weapon, is quoted as saying, “Certainly, and sooner than is believed, but, contrary to India, we have first thought of our people and then of technology. You see the result today.” In reply to questions on arms purchases, the Shah stated: “The Persian Gulf is a strategic zone of first importance. The smallest spark and everything blows up. The very sophisticated army that I maintain is my force de dissuasion et de frappe (deterrent and strike force). What do the French do with their bomb? I do the same with my resources.”

In the following day, 24th of June 1974, Iranian government spokesman and Minister of Information and Tourism Gholamreza Kianpour issued a strong official denial of the Shah’s comments in the French publication Les Informations regarding the possible Iranian acquisition of nuclear weapons. According to Kianpour, the Shah actually said Iran is not thinking of building atomic weapons but may revise its policy in this regard if other non-nuclear nations do. Kianpour also labeled false the Les Informations report that the monarch had implied India had neglected the welfare of its people in order to attain nuclear capability. The U.S. Embassy in Tehran commented that “Kianpour denial clearly indicates that current Iranian policy is not ... to acquire nuclear weapons. This is in keeping with previous [Iranian government] pronouncements and actions, including the signature and ratification of the Non-Proliferation Treaty and safeguards agreement. It may be that in interview with Les Informations the Shah wished to signal his concern about further proliferation and indicate that Iran could not stand idly by if other nations like Israel or Egypt should go nuclear.

US and European companies scrambled to do business in Iran. Bushehr, the first plant, would supply energy to the city of Shiraz. In 1975, the German firm Kraftwerk Union AG, a joint venture of Siemens AG and AEG, signed a contract worth $4 to $6 billion to build the pressurized water reactor plant. Construction of the two 1,196 MWe reactora was to have been completed in 1981.

In 1975, Sweden's 10 percent share in Eurodif went to Iran. The French government subsidiary company Cogéma and the Iranian Government established the Sofidif (Société franco–iranienne pour l'enrichissement de l'uranium par diffusion gazeuse) enterprise with 60 and 40 percent shares, respectively. Sofidif acquired a 25 percent share in Eurodif, which gave Iran its 10 percent share of Eurodif. The Shah lent 1 billion dollars, and another 180 million dollars in 1977, for the construction of the Eurodif factory, to have the right of buying 10 percent of the production of the site.

In 1976, US President Gerald Ford signed a directive offering Iran the chance to buy and operate a US-built reprocessing facility for extracting plutonium from reactor fuel. The Ford strategy paper said the "introduction of nuclear power will both provide for the growing needs of Iran's economy and free remaining oil reserves for export or conversion to petrochemicals."

A 1974 CIA proliferation assessment stated "If [the Shah] is alive in the mid-1980s ... and if other countries [particularly India] have proceeded with weapons development we have no doubt Iran will follow suit."

=== Post-revolution, 1979–1989 ===
Following the 1979 Revolution, most of the international nuclear cooperation with Iran was cut off. Kraftwerk Union stopped work at the Bushehr project in January 1979, with one reactor 50 percent complete, and the other reactor 85 percent complete, and fully withdrew from the project in July 1979. The company said they based their action on Iran's non-payment of $450 million in overdue payments, while other sources claim it was due to American pressure. The United States also cut off the supply of highly enriched fuel for the Tehran Nuclear Research Center, forcing it to shut down for a number of years. Eurodif also stopped supplying enriched uranium to Iran. Iran later argued that these experiences indicate foreign facilities and fuel supplies are an unreliable source of nuclear fuel supply.

In 1981, Iranian governmental officials concluded that the country's nuclear development should continue. Reports to the IAEA included that a site at Esfahan Nuclear Technology Center (ENTEC) would act "as the center for the transfer and development of nuclear technology, as well as contribute to the formation of local expertise and manpower needed to sustain a very ambitious program in the field of nuclear power reactor technology and fuel cycle technology." The IAEA also was informed about Entec's materials department, which was responsible for fabricating UO_{2} pellet fabrication, and chemical department, whose goal was the conversion of U_{3}O_{8} to nuclear grade UO_{2}.

In 1983, IAEA officials assisted Iran in chemical aspects of fuel fabrication, chemical engineering, and design aspects of pilot plants for uranium conversion, corrosion of nuclear materials, LWR fuel fabrication, and pilot plant development for production of nuclear grade UO_{2}. However, the US government "directly intervened" to discourage IAEA assistance in UO_{2} and UF_{6} production. A former US official said "we stopped that in its tracks." Iran later set up a bilateral cooperation on fuel cycle related issues with China, but China also agreed to drop most outstanding nuclear commerce with Iran, including the construction of the UF_{6} plant, due to US pressure.

In April 1984, the BND leaked a report that Iran might have a nuclear bomb within two years with Pakistani uranium; this was the first public Western intelligence report of a post-revolutionary nuclear weapons program in Iran. Later that year, Minority Whip of the US Senate Alan Cranston asserted that Iran was seven years away from being able to build its own nuclear weapon.

During the Iran–Iraq War, the two Bushehr reactors were damaged by multiple Iraqi air strikes and work on the nuclear program came to a standstill. Iran notified the International Atomic Energy Agency of the blasts, and complained about international inaction and the use of French-made missiles in the attack. In late 2015, Akbar Hashemi Rafsanjani revealed that Iran considered pursuing weapons of mass destruction during the war against Iraq (Specifically for the scenario where Saddam Hussein would have operationalized nuclear weapons during the Iran-Iraq War : "When we first began, we were at war and we sought to have that possibility for the day that the enemy might use a nuclear weapon. That was the thinking. But it never became real," Rafsanjani said in the interview, which was carried by state news agency IRNA).

In 1985, Iran began to pressure France in order to recover its debt from the Eurodif investment and to get the enriched uranium delivered. French hostages were taken in Lebanon from spring 1985; in 1986, terror attacks were perpetrated in Paris and Eurodif manager Georges Besse was assassinated. In their investigation La République atomique, France-Iran le pacte nucléaire, David Carr-Brown and Dominique Lorentz pointed to the Iranian intelligence services' responsibility. It was later ascertained that the assassination was committed by the left-wing terror group Action directe. On 6 May 1988, French premier Jacques Chirac signed an accord with Iran: France agreed to accept Iran as a shareholder of Eurodif and to deliver enriched uranium "without restrictions".

In 1987–88, Argentina's National Atomic Energy Commission signed an agreement with Iran to help in converting the reactor from HEU fuel to 19.75 percent low-enriched uranium, and to supply the latter fuel to Iran. According to a 2006 Argentine report, during the late 1980s and early 1990s the US pressured Argentina to terminate its nuclear cooperation with Iran, and from early 1992 to 1994 negotiations between Argentina and Iran took place with the aim of re-establishing the three agreements made in 1987–88. Some have linked attacks such as the 1992 attack on Israeli embassy in Buenos Aires and the AMIA bombing as part of an Iranian campaign to pressure Argentina into honoring the agreements. The uranium was delivered in 1993.

=== 1990–2002 ===
From the early 1990s, Russia formed a joint research organization with Iran called Persepolis that provided Iran with Russian nuclear experts, as well as technical information. Five Russian institutions, including Roscosmos, helped Tehran improve its missiles. The exchange of technical information with Iran was personally approved by SVR director Trubnikov. President Boris Yeltsin had a "two track policy" offering commercial nuclear technology to Iran and discussing the issues with Washington.

In 1991, France refunded more than $1.6 billion, while Iran remained a shareholder of Eurodif via Sofidif. However, Iran refrained from asking for the produced uranium.

In 1992, Iran invited IAEA inspectors to visit all the sites and facilities they asked. Director General Blix reported that all activities observed were consistent with the peaceful use of atomic energy. The IAEA visits included undeclared facilities and Iran's nascent uranium mining project at Saghand. In the same year, Argentine officials disclosed (under pressure from the US) that their country had canceled a sale to Iran of civilian nuclear equipment worth $18 million.

In 1995, Iran signed a contract with Rosatom to resume work on the partially complete Bushehr plant, installing into the existing Bushehr I building a 915 MWe VVER-1000 pressurized water reactor.

In 1996, the US convinced China to pull out of a contract to construct a uranium conversion plant. However, the Chinese provided blueprints for the facility to the Iranians, who advised the IAEA that they would continue work on the program; IAEA Director Mohamed ElBaradei even visited the construction site.

=== Overview of 2002–2012 ===
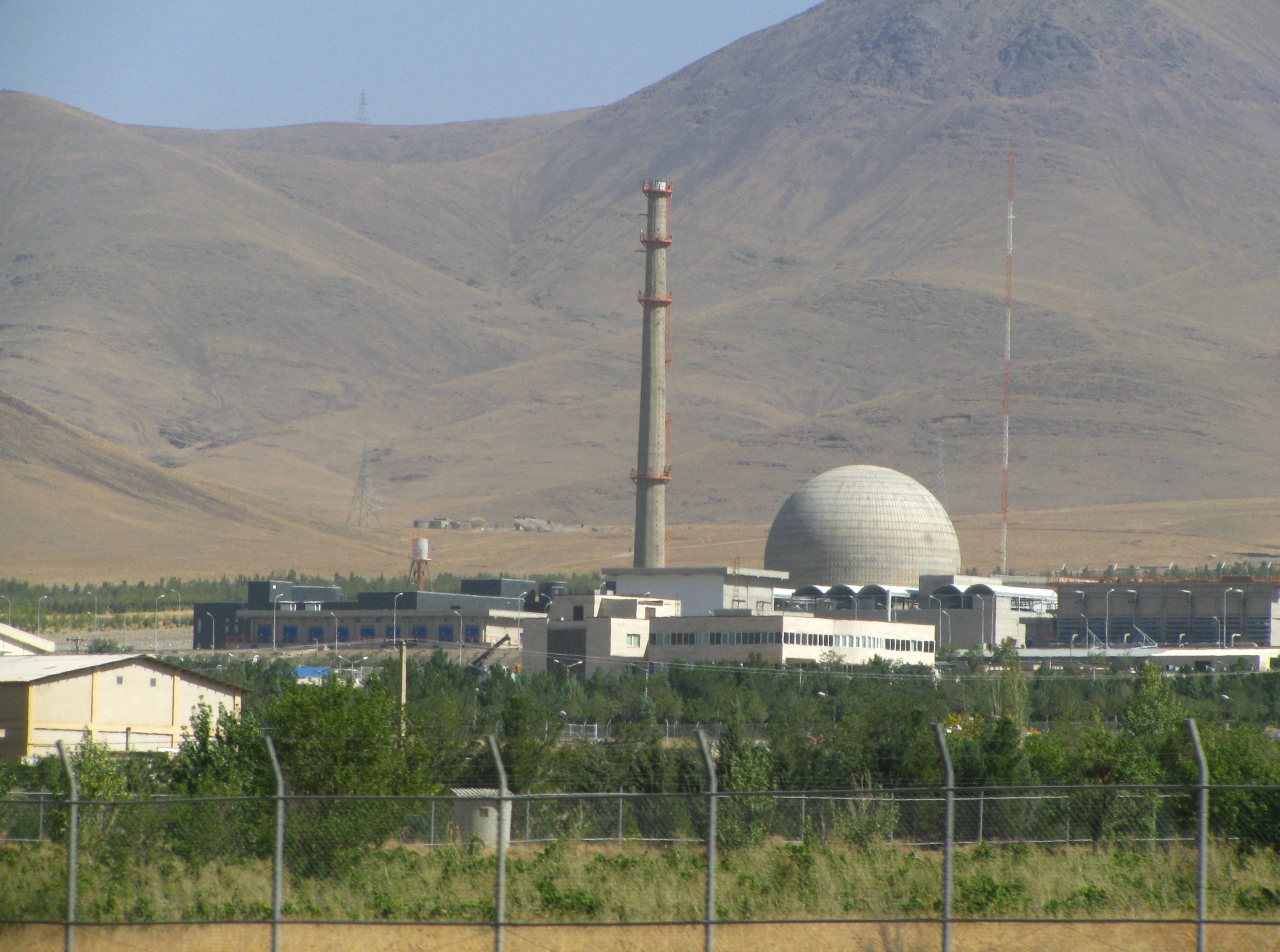
The IR-40 facility in Arak

In 2002, the National Council of Resistance of Iran (NCRI) exposed the existence of an undisclosed uranium enrichment facility in Natanz, leading to emerging concerns about Iran's nuclear program. In 2003, after the Iranian government formally acknowledged the facilities, the Atomic Energy Agency inspected them, finding that they had a more advanced nuclear program than had previously been anticipated by U.S. intelligence. In 2003, the International Atomic Energy Agency (IAEA) first reported that Iran had not declared extensive nuclear activities, including enrichment and reprocessing and related materials and facilities. Enrichment can be used to produce uranium for reactor fuel or (at higher enrichment levels) for weapons.

Iran says its nuclear program is peaceful, and had then enriched uranium to less than 5 percent, consistent with fuel for a civilian nuclear power plant. Iran also claimed that it was forced to resort to secrecy after US pressure caused several of its nuclear contracts with foreign governments to fall through. After the IAEA Board of Governors reported Iran's noncompliance with its safeguards agreement to the UN Security Council, the Council demanded that Iran suspend its nuclear enrichment activities.

Iranian president Mahmoud Ahmadinejad argued that the sanctions are "illegal," imposed by "arrogant powers," and that Iran has decided to pursue the monitoring of its self-described peaceful nuclear program through "its appropriate legal path," the International Atomic Energy Agency. The initial discovery of the enrichment facility in Natanz, as well as Iran's refusal to fully cooperate with the IAEA, heightened tensions between Iran and Western powers.

In November 2003, after public allegations about Iran's previously undeclared nuclear activities, the IAEA launched an investigation that concluded that Iran had systematically failed to meet its obligations under its NPT safeguards agreement to report those activities to the IAEA, although it also reported no evidence of links to a nuclear weapons program. The IAEA Board of Governors delayed a formal finding of non-compliance until September 2005, and reported that non-compliance to the Security Council in February 2006.

After the Board of Governors reported Iran's noncompliance with its safeguards agreement to the Security Council, the Council demanded that Iran suspend its enrichment programs. The Council imposed sanctions after Iran refused to do so. A May 2009 US Congressional Report suggested "the United States, and later the Europeans, argued that Iran's deception meant it should forfeit its right to enrich, a position likely to be up for negotiation in talks with Iran."

In exchange for suspending its enrichment program, Iran was offered "a long-term comprehensive arrangement which would allow for the development of relations and cooperation with Iran based on mutual respect and the establishment of international confidence in the exclusively peaceful nature of Iran's nuclear program." Iran has consistently refused to give up its enrichment program, arguing that the program is necessary for its energy security, that such "long term arrangements" are inherently unreliable, and would deprive it of its inalienable right to peaceful nuclear technology. In June 2009, in the immediate wake of the disputed Iranian presidential election, Iran initially agreed to a deal to relinquish its stockpile of low-enriched uranium in return for fuel for a medical research reactor, but then backed out of the deal. Currently, thirteen countries possess operational enrichment or reprocessing facilities, and several others have expressed an interest in developing indigenous enrichment programs.

To address concerns that its enrichment program may be diverted to non-peaceful uses, Iran offered to place additional restrictions on its enrichment program including, for example, ratifying the Additional Protocol to allow more stringent inspections by the International Atomic Energy Agency, operating the uranium enrichment facility at Natanz as a multinational fuel center with the participation of foreign representatives, renouncing plutonium reprocessing, and immediately fabricating all enriched uranium into fuel rods. Iran's offer to open its uranium enrichment program to foreign private and public participation mirrors suggestions of an IAEA expert committee which was formed to investigate the methods to reduce the risk that sensitive fuel cycle activities could contribute to national nuclear weapons capabilities. Some non-governmental US experts have endorsed this approach.

In every other case in which the IAEA Board of Governors made a finding of safeguards non-compliance involving clandestine enrichment or reprocessing, the resolution has involved (in the cases of Iraq and Libya) or is expected to involve (in the case of North Korea) at a minimum ending sensitive fuel cycle activities. According to Pierre Goldschmidt, former deputy director general and head of the department of safeguards at the IAEA, and Henry D. Sokolski, executive director of the Nonproliferation Policy Education Center, some other instances of safeguards noncompliance reported by the IAEA Secretariat (South Korea, Egypt) were never reported to the Security Council because the IAEA Board of Governors never made a formal finding of non-compliance. Though South Korea's case involved enriching uranium to levels near weapons grade, South Korea voluntarily reported the isolated activity and Goldschmidt has argued "political considerations also played a dominant role in the board's decision" to not make a formal finding of non-compliance.

A March 2012 US Congressional Research Service report quotes a 24 February IAEA report saying that Iran had stockpiled 240 pounds of 20-per-cent-enriched uranium as an indication of their capacity to enrich to higher levels. The authoritarian politics of Iran may pose additional challenges to a scientific program requiring cooperation among many technical specialists. Some experts argue that the intense focus on Iran's nuclear program detracts from a need for broader diplomatic engagement.

In March 2012, US intelligence officials interviewed by The New York Times said they continued to assess that Iran had not restarted its weaponization program, which the 2007 National Intelligence Estimate said Iran had discontinued in 2003, although they have found evidence that some weaponization-related activities have continued. The Israeli Mossad reportedly shared this belief.

=== 2002–2006 ===
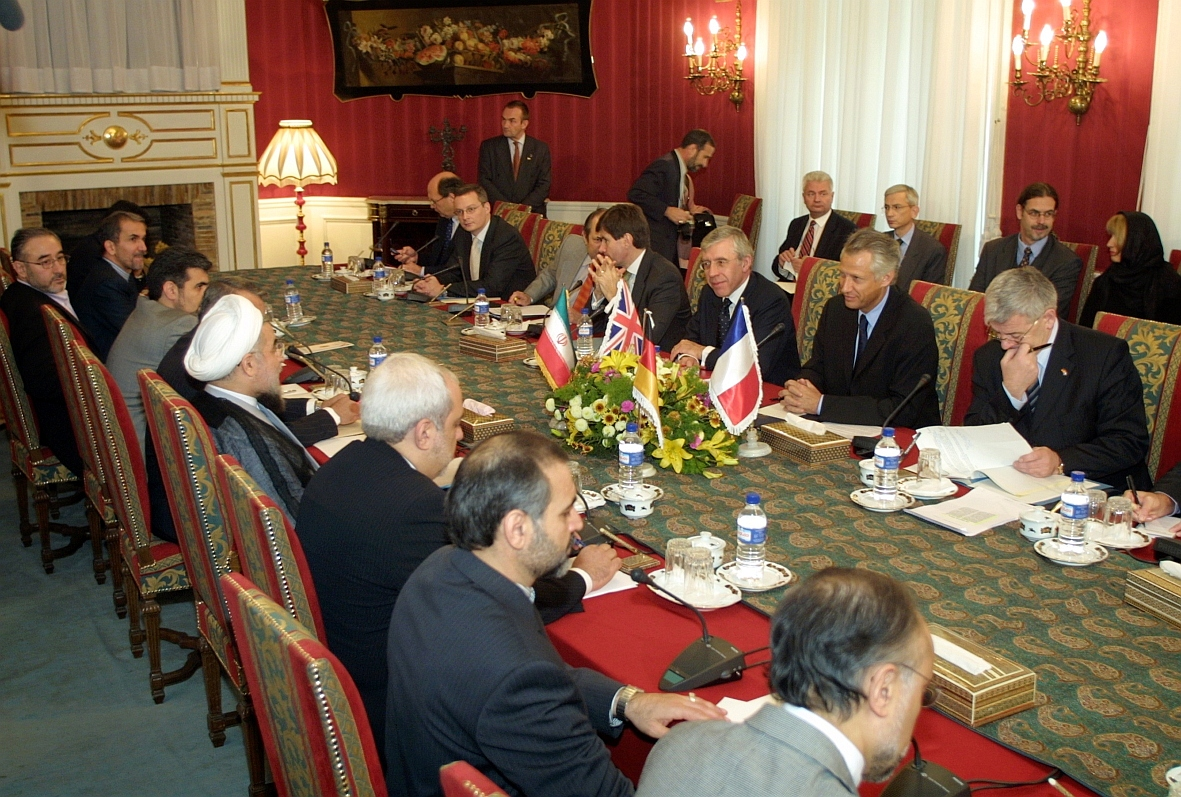
The Iran-EU-3's first meeting, Sa'dabad Palace, Tehran, 21 October 2003. EU-3 ministers and Iran's top negotiator Hassan Rouhani

In August 2002, Alireza Jafarzadeh, a spokesman for the National Council of Resistance of Iran, publicly revealed the existence of two nuclear sites under construction: a uranium enrichment facility in Natanz (part of which is underground), and a heavy water facility in Arak. It has been strongly suggested that intelligence agencies already knew about these facilities but the reports had been classified.

The IAEA immediately sought access to these facilities and further information and co-operation from Iran regarding its nuclear program. According to arrangements in force at the time for implementation of Iran's safeguards agreement with the IAEA, Iran was not required to allow IAEA inspections of a new nuclear facility until six months before nuclear material is introduced into that facility. At the time, Iran was not even required to inform the IAEA of the existence of the facility. This "six months" clause was standard for implementation of all IAEA safeguards agreements until 1992, when the IAEA Board of Governors decided that facilities should be reported during the planning phase, even before construction began. Iran was the last country to accept that decision, and only did so on 26 February 2003, after the IAEA investigation began.

In May 2003, shortly after the US invasion of Iraq, elements of the government of Mohammad Khatami made a confidential proposal for a "Grand Bargain" through Swiss diplomatic channels. It offered full transparency of Iran's nuclear program and withdrawal of support for Hamas and Hezbollah, in exchange for security assurances from the United States and a normalization of diplomatic relations. The Bush administration did not respond to the proposal, as senior US officials doubted its authenticity. The proposal reportedly was widely blessed by the Iranian government, including Supreme Leader Ayatollah Khamenei.

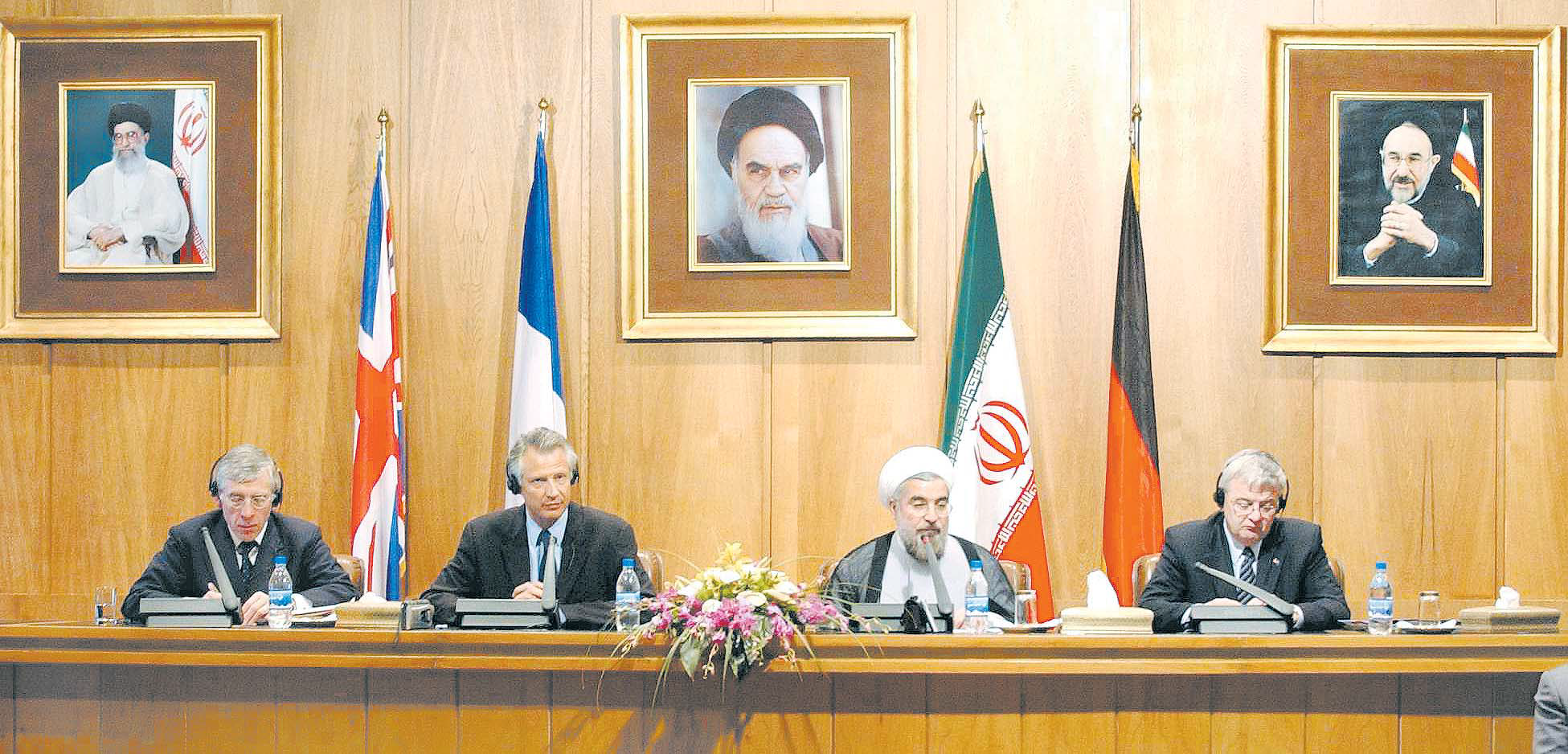
The Tehran Declaration on 21 October 2003, from right to left: Joschka Fischer, Hassan Rouhani, Dominique de Villepin and Jack Straw.

France, Germany and the United Kingdom (the EU-3) undertook a diplomatic initiative with Iran to resolve questions about its nuclear program. On 21 October 2003, in Tehran, the Iranian government and EU-3 Foreign Ministers issued a statement known as the Tehran Declaration in which Iran agreed to co-operate with the IAEA, to sign and implement an Additional Protocol as a voluntary, confidence-building measure, and to suspend its enrichment and reprocessing activities during the course of the negotiations.

The EU-3 in return explicitly agreed to recognize Iran's nuclear rights and to discuss ways Iran could provide "satisfactory assurances" regarding its nuclear power program, after which Iran would gain easier access to modern technology. Iran signed an Additional Protocol in December 2003, and agreed to act as if the protocol were in force, making the required reports to the IAEA and allowing the required access by IAEA inspectors, pending Iran's ratification of the Additional Protocol.

In November 2003, the IAEA reported , that "it is clear that Iran has failed in a number of instances over an extended period of time to meet its obligations under its Safeguards Agreement with respect to the reporting of nuclear material and its processing and use, as well as the declaration of facilities where such material has been processed and stored." Iran was obligated to inform the IAEA of its importation of uranium from China and subsequent use of that material in uranium conversion and enrichment activities. It was also obligated to report experiments with the separation of plutonium. In October 2005, the Islamic Republic reneged on its promise to permit the IAEA to carry out their inspections and suspended the Additional Protocol agreement outlined above.

A comprehensive list of Iran's specific "breaches" of its safeguards agreement, which the IAEA described as part of a "pattern of concealment," can be found in a November 2004 report of the IAEA on Iran's nuclear program. Iran attributed its failure to report certain acquisitions and activities to US obstructionism, which reportedly included pressuring the IAEA to cease providing technical assistance to Iran's uranium conversion program in 1983. On the question of whether Iran had a hidden nuclear weapons program, the IAEA's November 2003 report states that it found "no evidence" that the previously undeclared activities were related to a nuclear weapons program, but also that it was unable to conclude that Iran's nuclear program was exclusively peaceful.

In June 2004, construction began on IR-40, a 40 MW heavy water reactor.

Under the terms of the Paris Agreement, on 14 November 2004, Iran's chief nuclear negotiator announced a voluntary and temporary suspension of its uranium enrichment program (enrichment is not a violation of the NPT) and the voluntary implementation of the Additional Protocol, after pressure from the United Kingdom, France, and Germany on behalf of the European Union. The measure was said at the time to be a voluntary confidence-building measure, to continue for some reasonable period of time (six months being mentioned as a reference) as negotiations with the EU-3 continued.

On 24 November, Iran sought to amend the terms of its agreement with the EU to exclude a handful of the equipment from this deal for research work. This request was dropped four days later. According to Seyed Hossein Mousavian, one of the Iranian representatives to the Paris Agreement negotiations, the Iranians made it clear to their European counterparts that Iran would not consider a permanent end to uranium enrichment:

Before the Paris [Agreement] text was signed, Dr Rohani ... stressed that they should be committed neither to speak nor even think of a cessation any more. The ambassadors delivered his message to their foreign ministers prior to the signing of the Paris agreed text ... The Iranians made it clear to their European counterparts that if the latter sought a complete termination of Iran's nuclear fuel-cycle activities, there would be no negotiations. The Europeans answered that they were not seeking such a termination, only an assurance on the non-diversion of Iran's nuclear programme to military ends.

In February 2005, Iran pressed the EU-3 to speed up talks, which the EU-3 refused to do. The talks made little progress because of the divergent positions of the two sides. Under pressure from US, European negotiators could not agree to allow enrichment on Iranian soil. Although Iranians presented an offer, which included voluntary restrictions on the enrichment volume and output, it was rejected. The EU-3 broke a commitment they had made to recognize Iran's right under NPT to the peaceful use of nuclear energy.

In early August 2005, after the June election of Mahmoud Ahmadinejad as president, Iran removed seals on its uranium enrichment equipment in Isfahan, which UK officials termed a "breach of the Paris Agreement" though a case can be made that the EU violated the terms of the Paris Agreement by demanding that Iran abandon nuclear enrichment. Several days later, the EU-3 offered Iran a package in return for permanent cessation of enrichment. Reportedly, it included benefits in the political, trade and nuclear fields, as well as long-term supplies of nuclear materials and assurances of non-aggression by the EU (but not the US).

Deputy head of AEOI Mohammad Saeedi rejected the offer as "very insulting and humiliating" and independent analysts characterized it as an "empty box". Iran's announcement that it would resume enrichment preceded the election of Ahmadinejad by several months. The delay in restarting the program was to allow the IAEA to re-install monitoring equipment. The actual resumption of the program coincided with the election of Ahmadinejad, and the appointment of Ali Larijani as chief nuclear negotiator.

Around 2005, Germany refused to continue exporting nuclear equipment or refund money Iran had paid for such equipment in the 1980s.

In August 2005, with Pakistani assistance, a group of US government experts and international scientists concluded that traces of bomb-grade uranium found in Iran came from contaminated Pakistani equipment and were not evidence of a clandestine weapons program in Iran. In September 2005, IAEA Director General Mohamed ElBaradei reported that "most" highly enriched uranium traces found in Iran by agency inspectors came from imported centrifuge components, validating Iran's claim that the traces were due to contamination. Sources in Vienna and the State Department reportedly stated that, for all practical purposes, the HEU issue had been resolved.

On 17 September 2005, in a speech to the United Nations, Ahmadinejad suggested that Iran's enrichment might be managed by an international consortium, with Iran sharing ownership with other countries. The offer was rejected out of hand by the EU and the US.

The IAEA Board of Governors deferred a formal decision on Iran's nuclear case for two years after 2003, while Iran continued cooperation with the EU-3. On 24 September 2005, after Iran abandoned the Paris Agreement, the Board found that Iran had been in non-compliance with its safeguards agreement, based largely on facts that had been reported as early as November 2003.

On 4 February 2006, the 35-member Board voted 27–3 (with five abstentions: Algeria, Belarus, Indonesia, Libya, and South Africa) to report Iran to the UN Security Council. The measure was sponsored by the EU-3 and backed by the US. Two permanent Council members, Russia and China, agreed to referral only on condition that the Council take no action until March. The three members voting against referral were Venezuela, Syria, and Cuba. In response, on 6 February 2006, Iran suspended its voluntary implementation of the Additional Protocol and all other voluntary and non-binding cooperation with the IAEA beyond that required by its safeguards agreement.

In late February 2006, IAEA Director ElBaradei proposed a deal whereby Iran would give up industrial-scale enrichment and limit its program to a small-scale pilot facility, and agree to import its nuclear fuel from Russia (see nuclear fuel bank). The Iranians indicated that while they would not be willing to give up their right to enrichment in principle, they were willing to consider a compromise. However, in March 2006, the Bush administration made it clear that they would not accept any enrichment at all in Iran.

The IAEA Board of Governors deferred the formal report to the Security Council of Iran's non-compliance (required by Article XII.C of the IAEA Statute) until 27 February 2006. The Board usually makes decisions by consensus, but in a rare decision it adopted the resolution by vote, with 12 abstentions.

On 11 April 2006, Ahmadinejad announced that Iran had successfully enriched uranium in a televised address from the northeastern city of Mashhad, where he said "I am officially announcing that Iran joined the group of those countries which have nuclear technology." The uranium was enriched to 3.5 percent using over a hundred centrifuges.

On 13 April 2006, after US Secretary of State Condoleezza Rice said the previous day that the Security Council must consider "strong steps" to induce Tehran to change course in its nuclear ambitions, Ahmadinejad vowed that Iran would not back away from uranium enrichment and that the world must treat Iran as a nuclear power, saying "Our answer to those who are angry about Iran achieving the full nuclear fuel cycle is just one phrase. We say: Be angry at us and die of this anger," because "We won't hold talks with anyone about the right of the Iranian nation to enrich uranium."

On 14 April 2006, the Institute for Science and International Security published a series of analyzed satellite images of Iran's nuclear facilities at Natanz and Esfahan. Featured in these images is a new tunnel entrance near the Uranium Conversion Facility at Esfahan and continued construction at the Natanz uranium enrichment site. In addition, a series of images dating back to 2002 shows the underground enrichment buildings and its subsequent covering by soil, concrete, and other materials. Both facilities were already subject to IAEA inspections and safeguards.

In July 2006, the UN Security Council approved a resolution to give Iran until the end of August to suspend uranium enrichment or face the threat of sanctions.

On 24 August 2006, Iran responded to the demand to stop enrichment of uranium, offering to return to the negotiation table but refusing to end enrichment.

On 30 August 2006, Majlis speaker Qolam Ali Hadad-adel said that Iran had the right to "peaceful application of nuclear technology and all other officials agree with this decision," according to the semi-official Iranian Students News Agency. "Iran opened the door to negotiations for Europe and hopes that the answer which was given to the nuclear package would bring them to the table."

In Resolution 1696 of 31 July 2006, the Security Council demanded that Iran suspend all enrichment and reprocessing related activities.

In Resolution 1737 of 26 December 2006, the Council imposed a series of sanctions on Iran for its non-compliance with Resolution 1696. These sanctions were primarily targeted against the transfer of nuclear and ballistic missile technologies and, in response to concerns of China and Russia, were lighter than that sought by the United States. This resolution followed a report from the IAEA that Iran had permitted inspections under its safeguards agreement but had not suspended its enrichment-related activities.

=== 2013–2015 ===
==== September 2013 Ministerial meeting ====
Foreign Ministers of the P5+1 met in September 2013 on the margins of the United Nations General Assembly, and were joined by Iranian Foreign Minister Zarif.

==== October–November 2013 negotiations ====
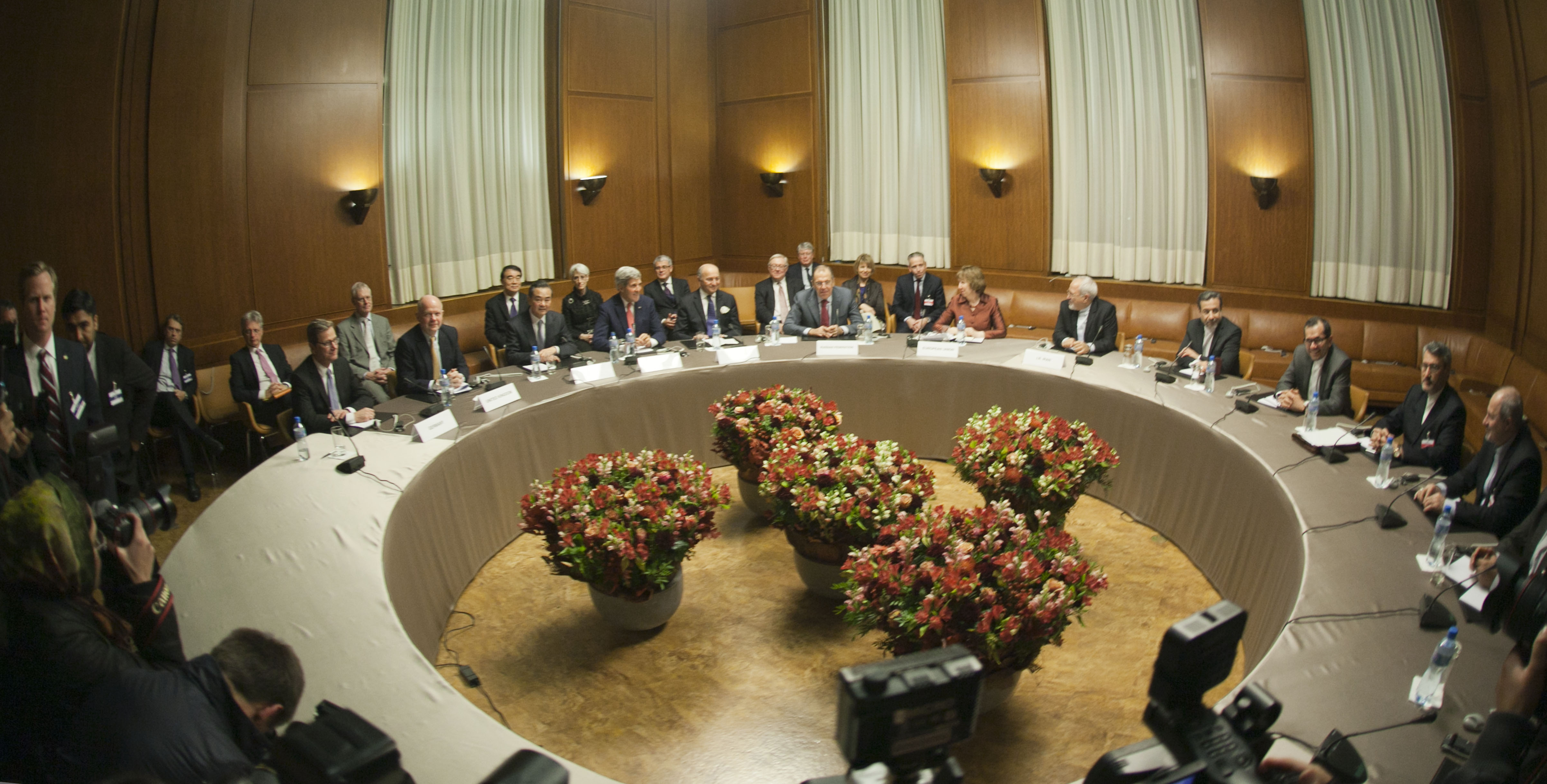
Catherine Ashton, P5+1 and Iran foreign ministers in Geneva negotiations, November 2013

Lead negotiators for the P5+1 and Iran met in Geneva 15–16 October to discuss elements of a possible framework for resolving questions about Iran's nuclear program. Experts from the P5+1 and Iran met in Vienna 30–31 October to exchange detailed information on those elements. Lead negotiators met again 7–8 November to negotiate that framework, joined at the end by Foreign Ministers from the P5+1, but despite extending the talks past midnight 9 November were unable to agree on that framework and agreed instead to meet again 20 November.

On 24 November, the foreign ministers of Iran and the P5+1 agreed to a six-month interim deal that involves the freezing of key parts of the Iranian nuclear program in exchange for a decrease in sanctions, to provide time to negotiate a permanent agreement. Iran will stop enriching uranium beyond five percent, and will stop development of their Arak plant. The UN will be granted greater access for inspections. In exchange, Iran will receive relief from sanctions of approximately US$7 billion (£4.3 billion) and no additional sanctions will be imposed. President Obama called the agreement an "important first step." Following further negotiation of implementation details, a summary of which was released by the White House on 16 January 2014, implementation began 20 January 2014.

==== Implementation ====
On 20 February 2014 the IAEA reported that Iran was implementing its commitments to the P5+1 and its commitments to the IAEA under the Joint Statement of 11 November 2013.

==== February–July 2014 negotiations ====
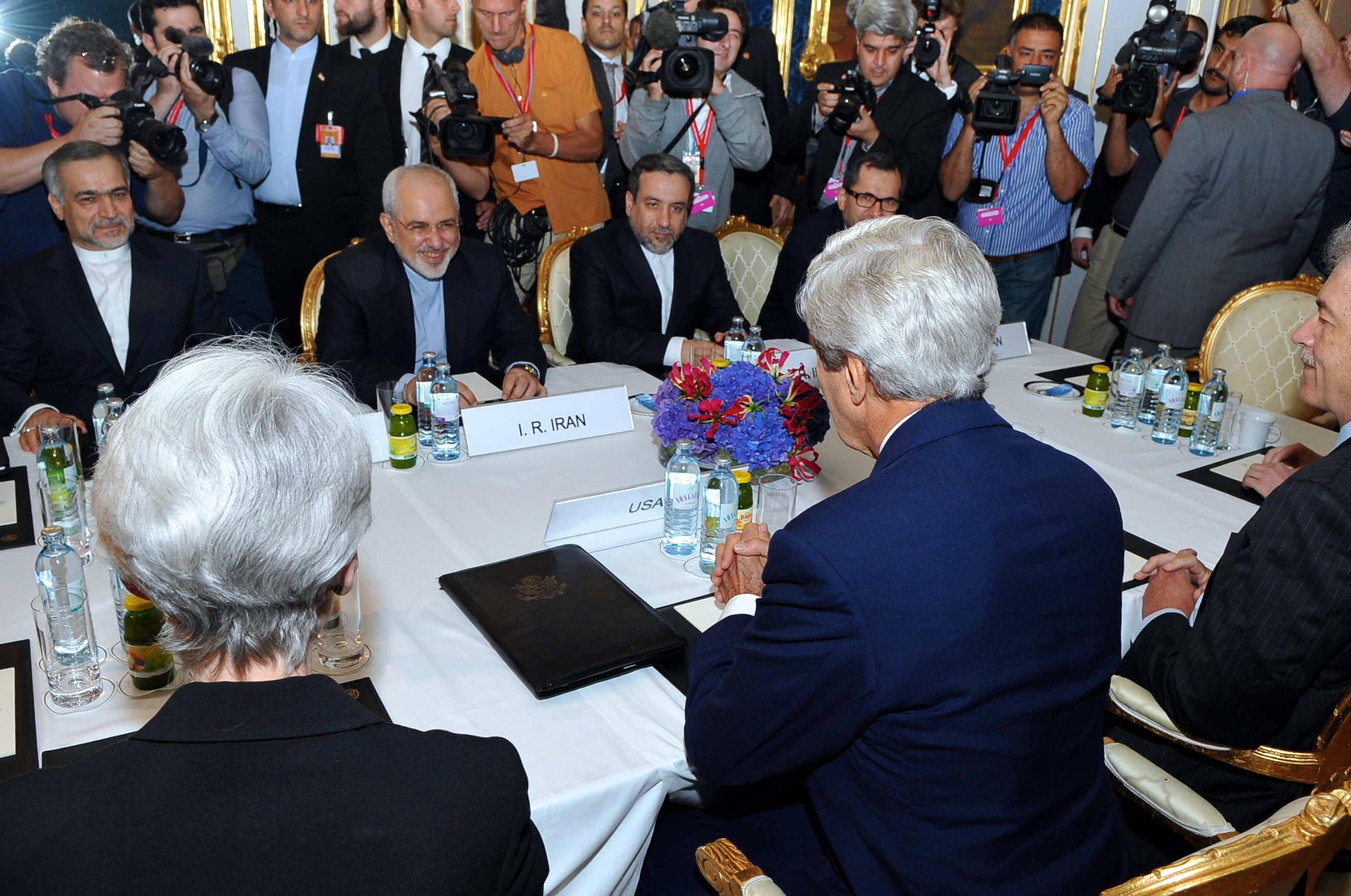
U.S. Secretary of State John Kerry sits across from Iranian Foreign Minister Mohammad Javad Zarif in Vienna, Austria, July 2014

During February to July 2014, the P5+1 and Iran held high-level negotiations on a comprehensive agreement on Iran's nuclear program in Vienna, Austria. After six rounds of talks the parties missed the deadline for reaching a deal and agreed to extend the negotiations through 24 November. Additionally, it was agreed that the US will unblock $2.8 billion in frozen Iranian funds, in exchange for Iran continuing to convert its stocks of 20 percent enriched uranium into fuel.

The EU Court of Justice annulled a freeze of the Iranian Sharif University's assets since the EU could not provide sufficient evidence of the university's links to the nuclear program of Iran.

=== Joint Comprehensive Plan of Action ===
An Iran nuclear deal framework was reached in April 2015. Under this framework Iran agreed tentatively to accept restrictions on its nuclear program, all of which would last for at least a decade and some longer, and to submit to an increased intensity of international inspections. The Joint Comprehensive Plan of Action (JCPOA), was finally reached on 14 July 2015. The final agreement is based upon "the rules-based nonproliferation regime created by the Nuclear Non-Proliferation Treaty (NPT) and including especially the IAEA safeguards system".

=== 2016–present ===
In January 2016, it was announced that Iran had dismantled major parts of its nuclear program, paving the way for sanctions to be lifted.

In 2018 the Mossad reportedly stole nuclear secrets from a secure warehouse in the Turquzabad district of Tehran. According to reports, the agents came in a truck semitrailer at midnight, cut into dozens of safes with "high intensity torches", and carted out "50,000 pages and 163 compact discs of memos, videos and plans" before leaving in time to make their escape when the guards came for the morning shift at 7 am. According to a US intelligence official, an "enormous" Iranian "dragnet operation" was unsuccessful in recovering the documents, which escaped through Azerbaijan.

According to the Israelis, the documents and files, which it shared with European countries and the United States, demonstrated that the Iranian AMAD Project aimed to develop nuclear weapons, that Iran had a nuclear program when it claimed to have "largely suspended it", and that there were two nuclear sites in Iran that had been hidden from inspectors. Iran claims "the whole thing was a hoax". This influenced Trump's decision to withdraw the United States from the JCPOA and reimpose sanctions on Iran.

In February 2019, the IAEA certified that Iran was still abiding by the international Joint Comprehensive Plan of Action (JCPOA) of 2015.

On 8 May 2019, Iran announced it would suspend implementation of some parts of the JCPOA, threatening further action in 60 days unless it received protection from US sanctions. In July 2019, the IAEA confirmed that Iran has breached both the 300 kg enriched uranium stockpile limit and the 3.67% refinement limit. On 5 November 2019, Iranian nuclear chief Ali Akbar Salehi announced that Iran will enrich uranium to 5% at the Fordow Uranium Enrichment Plant, adding the country had the capability to enrich uranium to 20% if needed. Also in November, Behrouz Kamalvandi, spokesman for the Atomic Energy Organization of Iran, stated that Iran can enrich up to 60% if needed.

President Hassan Rouhani declared that Iran's nuclear program would be "limitless" while the country launches the third phase of quitting from the 2015 nuclear deal.

In January 2020, following the killing of Iranian Quds Force commander Qasem Soleimani, Iran stated that it would no longer abide by the JCPOA's restrictions on its enrichment program.

In March 2020, the IAEA said that Iran had nearly tripled its stockpile of enriched uranium since early November 2019.

In June 2020, following reports by IAEA Director General Rafael Grossi in March and June describing the IAEA's efforts to resolve questions about the correctness and completeness of Iran's declarations, the IAEA Board of Governors passed a resolution calling on Iran to cooperate fully in implementing its safeguards agreement and Additional Protocol and to grant access to two suspected former nuclear sites and address doubts regarding undeclared nuclear material. Iran denounced the resolution.

In late June and early July 2020, there were several explosions in Iran, including one that damaged the Natanz enrichment plant (see 2020 Iran explosions).

On 2 July 2020, the above-ground main advanced centrifuge assembly facility at Natanz was destroyed by physical sabotage by Israel's Mossad. After the July explosion, Iran started moving three cascades, or clusters, of different advanced models of centrifuge to its below-ground Fuel Enrichment Plant (FEP).

In September 2020, the IAEA reported that Iran had accumulated ten times as much enriched uranium as permitted by the JCPOA.

In November 2020, the IAEA reported that Iran had started feeding uranium hexafluoride (UF_{6}) into a newly installed underground cascade of 174 advanced IR-2m centrifuges at Natanz, which the JCPOA did not permit.

Iran's top nuclear scientist, Mohsen Fakhrizadeh, was assassinated in Tehran, Iran on 27 November 2020. Fakhrizadeh was believed to be the primary force behind Iran's covert nuclear program for many decades. The New York Times reported that Israel's Mossad was behind the attack and that Mick Mulroy, the former Deputy Defense Secretary for the Middle East said the death of Fakhirizadeh was "a setback to Iran’s nuclear program and he was also a senior officer in the Islamic Revolutionary Guard Corps, and that "will magnify Iran’s desire to respond by force."

In January 2021, Iran told the IAEA that it would enrich uranium to 20%, as it had done before the JCPOA.

In February 2021, Iran's Foreign Ministry confirmed that the country has informed IAEA about its plans to reduce the commitments made to the agency, alongside limiting the IAEA's access to Iran's nuclear facilities.

Later in February the IAEA confirmed that Iran had begun to produce uranium metal, in contravention of the JCPOA. Iranian leaders have claimed that "the country’s nuclear program has always been intended solely for peaceful civilian purposes." The UK, France, and Germany said that Iran has "no credible civilian use for uranium metal" and called the news "deeply concerning" because of its "potentially grave military implications" (as the use of metallic enriched uranium is for bombs).

In March 2021, Iran started enriching UF_{6} uranium at its Natanz facility with a second type of advanced centrifuge, the IR-4, in a further breach of the JCPOA.

On 10 April, Iran began injecting uranium hexafluoride gas into advanced IR-6 and IR-5 centrifuges at Natanz, but on the next day, an explosion, widely attributed to Israeli sabotage, damaged the facility. In response to the Natanz incident, Iran began producing 60% highly enriched uranium in limited amounts. The head of the IAEA, Rafael Grossi, stated that "only countries making bombs are reaching this level". The New Yorker reported in January 2022 that "the so-called 'breakout' time for Iran to produce enough fuel for a bomb has plummeted, from more than a year to as little as three weeks."

In March 2022, Iran defied Western powers by turning part of its enriched uranium to near-weapons-grade into a form that is more difficult to retrieve, dilute, and transport out of the country, according to a report released by the United Nations nuclear watchdog.

In March 2022, Iran and the IAEA agreed to a three-month plan that, in the best-case scenario, would handle the long-stalled issue of uranium particles discovered at old but undeclared locations in the nation, removing a roadblock to the Iran nuclear deal being resurrected.

In April 2022, Iran handed over documents linked to pending concerns to the IAEA as it requested for the agency's inquiry into uranium particles discovered at three undeclared facilities to be closed.

On 14 April 2022, the IAEA said in a report seen by Reuters that Iran is starting to operate a new workshop at Natanz that would build parts for uranium-enriching centrifuges using machinery relocated from its now-closed Karaj plant.

On 29 April 2022, according to IAEA Director General Rafael Grossi, Iran's new workshop at Natanz for fabricating centrifuge parts was set up underground, presumably to protect it from possible attacks. In May 2022, Grossi warned that Iran has been dragging its feet on information about uranium particles found at old undeclared locations in the country.

In May 2022, during a video posted on social media, Israeli Prime Minister Naftali Bennett showed a stack of compromising documents stolen by Iran from the IAEA and later obtained by the Mossad during a 2018 raid in a warehouse in Tehran. The documents in Israel's possession includes what appears to be a request by the then Iranian defense minister to come up with a cover story to hide evidence from the UN's atomic agency in case of inspections.

In June 2022, Iran turned off two IAEA surveillance cameras that were installed at a nuclear facility as part of the 2015 nuclear deal. Shortly after, the IAEA board of governors rebuked Iran for failing to explain uranium traces found at three undeclared sites. The US, UK, Germany and France urged Iran to cooperate with IAEA. Later Iran decided to remove 27 surveillance cameras belonging to IAEA from several nuclear sites.

On 25 June 2022, in a meeting with the senior diplomat of the EU, Ali Shamkhani, Iran's top security officer, declared that Iran would continue to advance its nuclear program until the West modifies its "illegal behavior."

In July 2022, according to an IAEA report seen by Reuters, Iran had increased its uranium enrichment through the use of sophisticated equipment at its underground Fordow plant in a configuration that can more quickly vary between enrichment levels.

In September 2022, Germany, United Kingdom and France expressed doubts over Iran's sincerity in returning to the JCPOA after Tehran insisted that the IAEA close its probes into uranium traces at three undeclared Iranian sites. The IAEA said it could not guarantee the peaceful nature of Iran's nuclear program, stating there had been "no progress in resolving questions about the past presence of nuclear material at undeclared sites." United Nations Secretary-General António Guterres urged Iran to hold "serious dialogue" about nuclear inspections and said IAEA's independence is "essential" in response to Iranian demands to end probes.

On 22 October 2022, the Iranian hacktivist group Black Reward leaked 50 gigabytes of internal emails, contracts, and construction plans related to Iran's Bushehr power plant. The group stated that they released the documents after the government failed to respond to their demand of releasing the protestors arrested during the Mahsa Amini protests, whom Black Reward described as political prisoners. Iran's civil nuclear arm acknowledged that hackers had breached their email system, which was being used by the Nuclear Power Production and Development Company who operates the country's sole nuclear power plant in Bushehr.

In February 2023, the IAEA reported having found uranium in Iran enriched to 84%. The Iranian government has claimed that this is an "unintended fluctuation" in the enrichment levels, though the Iranians have been openly enriching uranium to 60% purity, a breach of the 2015 nuclear deal. In the same month, the U.S. Intelligence Community said in its annual threat report that "since the assassination of Fakhrizadeh, Iran has accelerated the expansion of its nuclear program and undertaken research and development activities that would bring it closer to producing the fissile material for completing a nuclear device following a decision to do so."

In August 2023, Iran's nuclear chief, Mohammad Eslami, confirmed the continuation of uranium enrichment activities, based on parliamentary legislation. It followed reports of Iran slowing its 60% uranium enrichment, potentially easing tensions and reviving nuclear talks with the US.

As of 2023, the IAEA stated in an October quarterly report that Iran is estimated to have further increased its uranium stockpile twenty-two times over the 2015 agreed JCPOA limit. The IAEA also noted that Iran has continued to push back against inspections of its nuclear program and several inspectors had been barred by Iran, a move that received condemnation by the agency.

In November 2024, Iran announced that it would make new advanced centrifuges after IAEA condemned Iranians' non-compliance and secrecy.

In 2024, Iranian President Masoud Pezeshkian expressed interest in reopening discussions with the United States on the nuclear deal.

In March 2025, U.S. President Donald Trump sent a letter to Iran seeking to reopen negotiations. Ayatollah Ali Khamenei later said, "Some bullying governments insist on negotiations not to resolve issues but to impose their own expectations," which was seen as in response to the letter.

In April 2025, Trump revealed that Iran had decided to undertake talks with the United States for an agreement over its nuclear program. On 12 April, both countries held their first high-level meeting in Oman, followed by a second meeting on 19 April in Italy.

In June 2025, the National Council of Resistance of Iran (NCRI) said Iran is pursuing nuclear weapons through a new program called the "Kavir Plan". According to the NCRI, the new project involves six sites in Semnan province working on warheads and related technology, succeeding the previous AMAD Project.

== UN Security Council ==
The UN Security Council has passed eight resolutions on Iran's nuclear program:

- Resolution 1696, 31 July 2006, demanded that Iran suspend its uranium enrichment activities.
- Resolution 1737, 23 December 2006, imposed sanctions after Iran refused to suspend its enrichment activities, required Iran to cooperate with IAEA.
- Resolution 1747, 24 March 2007, expanded the list of sanctioned Iranian entities.
- Resolution 1803, 3 March 2008, extended those sanctions to additional persons and entities.
- Resolution 1835, 27 September 2008, reaffirmed the preceding four resolutions.
- Resolution 1929, 9 June 2010, imposed a complete arms embargo on Iran, banned Iran from any activities related to ballistic missiles, authorized the inspection and seizure of shipments violating these restrictions, extended the asset freeze to the Islamic Revolutionary Guard Corps and the Islamic Republic of Iran Shipping Lines (IRISL), and established a Panel of Experts (whose mandate was extended three times by Resolution 1984 (8 June 2011), Resolution 2049 (7 June 2012), and Resolution 2105 (5 June 2013)).

== IAEA Intervention ==
=== IAEA reports, 2007–2015 ===
The IAEA has consistently stated it is unable to conclude that Iran's nuclear program is entirely peaceful. Such a conclusion would normally be drawn only for countries that have an Additional Protocol in force. Iran ceased its implementation of the Additional Protocol in 2006, and also ceased all other cooperation with the IAEA beyond what Iran acknowledged it was required to provide under its safeguards agreement, after the IAEA Board of Governors decided, in February 2006, to report Iran's safeguards non-compliance to the Security Council.

The Council, invoking Chapter VII of the UN Charter, then passed Resolution 1737, which obligated Iran to implement the Additional Protocol. Iran responded that its nuclear activities were peaceful and that Security Council involvement was malicious and unlawful. In August 2007, Iran and the IAEA entered into an agreement on the modalities for resolving remaining outstanding issues, and made progress in outstanding issues except for the question of "alleged studies" of weaponization by Iran. Iran said it did not address the alleged studies in the IAEA work plan because they were not included in the plan.

The IAEA did not detect the actual use of nuclear material in connection with the alleged studies and said it regrets it was unable to provide Iran with copies of the documentation concerning the alleged studies, but said the documentation was comprehensive and detailed, and therefore needed to be taken seriously. Iran said the allegations are based on "forged" documents and "fabricated" data, and that had not received copies of the documentation to enable it to prove that they were forged and fabricated.

In 2011, the IAEA began to voice growing concern over possible military dimensions to Iran's nuclear program, and has released a number of reports chastising Iran's nuclear program to that effect.

In February 2007, anonymous diplomats at the IAEA reportedly complained that most US intelligence shared with the IAEA had proved inaccurate, and none had led to significant discoveries inside Iran.

In May 2007, Iran and the IAEA vehemently denied reports that Iran had blocked IAEA inspectors when they sought access to Iran's enrichment facility. On 11 March 2007, Reuters quoted IAEA spokesman Marc Vidricaire, "We have not been denied access at any time, including in the past few weeks. Normally we do not comment on such reports but this time we felt we had to clarify the matter ... If we had a problem like that we would have to report to the [35-nation IAEA governing] board ... That has not happened because this alleged event did not take place."

On 30 July 2007, IAEA inspectors spent five hours at the Arak complex, the first such visit since April. Visits to other plants in Iran were expected during the following days. It has been suggested that access may have been granted in an attempt to head off further sanctions.

==== August 2007 Report and Agreement between Iran and the IAEA ====
An August 2007 IAEA report to the Board of Governors, stated that Iran's Fuel Enrichment Plant at Natanz was operating "well below the expected quantity for a facility of this design," and that 12 of the intended 18 centrifuge cascades at the plant were operating. The report stated that the IAEA had "been able to verify the non-diversion of the declared nuclear materials at the enrichment facilities in Iran," and that longstanding issues regarding plutonium experiments and HEU contamination on spent fuel containers were considered "resolved." However, the report added that the Agency remained unable to verify certain aspects relevant to the scope and nature of Iran's nuclear program.

The report outlined a workplan agreed to by Iran and the IAEA on 21 August 2007. The workplan reflected agreement on "modalities for resolving the remaining safeguards implementation issues, including the long outstanding issues." According to the plan, these modalities covered all remaining issues regarding Iran's past nuclear program and activities. The IAEA report described the workplan as "a significant step forward," but added "the Agency considers it essential that Iran adheres to the time line defined therein and implements all the necessary safeguards and transparency measures, including the measures provided for in the Additional Protocol." Although the workplan did not include a commitment by Iran to implement the Additional Protocol, IAEA safeguards head Olli Heinonen observed that measures in the workplan "for resolving our outstanding issues go beyond the requirements of the Additional Protocol."

According to Reuters, the report was likely to blunt Washington's push for more severe sanctions against Iran. One senior UN official familiar said US efforts to escalate sanctions against Iran would provoke a nationalistic backlash by Iran that would set back the IAEA investigation in Iran. In late October 2007, chief IAEA inspector Olli Heinonen described Iranian cooperation with the IAEA as "good," although much remained to be done.

In late October 2007, according to the International Herald Tribune, the head of the IAEA, Mohamed ElBaradei, stated that he had seen "no evidence" of Iran developing nuclear weapons. The IHT quoted ElBaradei as saying "We have information that there has been maybe some studies about possible weaponization. That's why we have said that we cannot give Iran a pass right now, because there is still a lot of question marks. ... But have we seen Iran having the nuclear material that can readily be used into a weapon? No. Have we seen an active weaponization program? No." The IHT report went on to say that "ElBaradei said he was worried about the growing rhetoric from the U.S., which he noted focused on Iran's alleged intentions to build a nuclear weapon rather than evidence the country was actively doing so. If there is actual evidence, ElBaradei said he would welcome seeing it."

==== November 2007 report ====
A IAEA report of 15 November 2007 found that on nine outstanding issues listed in the August 2007 workplan, including experiments on the P-2 centrifuge and work with uranium metals, "Iran's statements are consistent with ... information available to the agency," but it warned that its knowledge of Tehran's present atomic work was shrinking due to Iran's refusal to continue voluntarily implementing the Additional Protocol, as it had done in the past under the October 2003 Tehran agreement and the November 2004 Paris agreement. The only remaining issues were traces of HEU found at one location, and allegations by US intelligence agencies based on a laptop computer allegedly stolen from Iran which reportedly contained nuclear weapons-related designs. The IAEA report also stated that Tehran continues to produce LEU. Iran has declared it has a right to peaceful nuclear technology under the NPT, despite Security Council demands that it cease its nuclear enrichment.

On 18 November 2007, Ahmadinejad announced that he intended to consult with Arab nations on a plan, under the auspices of the Gulf Cooperation Council, to enrich uranium in a neutral third country, such as Switzerland.

Israel criticized IAEA reports on Iran as well as the former IAEA-director ElBaradei. Israel's Minister of Strategic Affairs Avigdor Lieberman dismissed the IAEA reports as being "unacceptable" and accused IAEA head ElBaradei of being "pro-Iranian."

==== February 2008 report ====
On 11 February 2008, news reports stated that the IAEA report on Iran's compliance with the August 2007 workplan would be delayed over internal disagreements over the report's expected conclusions that the major issues had been resolved. French Foreign Minister Bernard Kouchner stated that he would meet with ElBaradei to convince him to "listen to the West" and remind him that the IAEA is merely in charge of the "technical side" rather than the "political side" of the issue. A senior IAEA official denied the reports of internal disagreements and accused Western powers of using the same "hype" tactics employed against Iraq before the 2003 US-led invasion to justify imposing further sanctions on Iran over its nuclear program.

On 22 February 2008, the IAEA issued its report on the implementation of safeguards in Iran. ElBaradei stated that "We have managed to clarify all the remaining outstanding issues, including the most important issue, which is the scope and nature of Iran's enrichment programme" with the exception of a single issue, "and that is the alleged weaponization studies that supposedly Iran has conducted in the past."

According to the report, the IAEA shared intelligence with Iran recently provided by the US regarding "alleged studies" on a nuclear weaponization program. The information was allegedly obtained from a laptop computer smuggled out of Iran and provided to the US in mid-2004. The laptop was reportedly received from a "longtime contact" in Iran who obtained it from someone else now believed to be dead. A senior European diplomat warned "I can fabricate that data," and argued that the documents look "beautiful, but is open to doubt." The United States has relied on the laptop to prove that Iran intends to develop nuclear weapons. In November 2007, the United States National Intelligence Estimate (NIE) believed that Iran halted an alleged active nuclear weapons program in 2003. Iran has dismissed the laptop information as a fabrication, and other diplomats have dismissed the information as relatively insignificant and coming too late.

The February 2008 IAEA report states that the IAEA has "not detected the use of nuclear material in connection with the alleged studies, nor does it have credible information in this regard."

==== May 2008 report ====
On 26 May 2008, the IAEA issued another regular report on the implementation of safeguards in Iran, in which the IAEA has been able to continue to verify the non-diversion of declared nuclear material in Iran, and Iran has provided the IAEA with access to declared nuclear material and accountancy reports, as required by its safeguards agreement. Iran had installed several new centrifuges, including more advanced models, and environmental samples showed the centrifuges "continued to operate as declared", making low-enriched uranium. The report noted that other elements of Iran's nuclear program continued to be subject to IAEA monitoring and safeguards as well, including the construction of the heavy water facility in Arak, the construction and use of hot cells associated with the Tehran Research Reactor, the uranium conversion efforts, and the Russian nuclear fuel delivered for the Bushehr reactor.

The report stated that the IAEA had requested, as a voluntary "transparency measure", to be allowed access to centrifuge manufacturing sites, but that Iran had refused the request. The IAEA report stated that Iran had also submitted replies to questions regarding "possible military dimensions" to its nuclear program, which include "alleged studies" on a so-called Green Salt Project, high-explosive testing and missile re-entry vehicles. According to the report, Iran's answers were still under review by the IAEA at the time the report was published. However, as part of its earlier "overall assessment" of the allegations, Iran had responded that the documents making the allegations were forged, not authentic, or referred to conventional applications.

The report stated that Iran may have more information on the alleged studies, which "remain a matter of serious concern", but that the IAEA itself had not detected evidence of actual design or manufacture by Iran of nuclear weapons or components. The IAEA stated that it was not itself in possession of certain documents containing the allegations against Iran, and so was not able to share the documents with Iran.

==== September 2008 report ====
In a September 2008 IAEA report on the implementation of safeguards in Iran, Iran continued to provide the IAEA with access to declared nuclear material and activities, which continued to be operated under safeguards and with no evidence of any diversion of nuclear material for non-peaceful uses. Nevertheless, the report reiterated that the IAEA would not be able to verify the exclusively peaceful nature of Iran's nuclear program unless Iran adopted "transparency measures" which exceeded its safeguards agreement with the IAEA, since the IAEA does not verify the absence of undeclared nuclear activities in any country unless the Additional Protocol is in force.

ElBaradei stated that "we have managed to clarify all the remaining outstanding issues, including the most important issue, which is the scope and nature of Iran's enrichment programme" with the exception of a single issue, "and that is the alleged weaponization studies that supposedly Iran has conducted in the past." According to the report, Iran had increased the number of operating centrifuges at its Fuel Enrichment Plant in Isfahan, and continued to enrich uranium. Contrary to some media reports which claimed that Iran had diverted uranium hexafluoride (UF_{6}) for a renewed nuclear weapons program, the IAEA emphasized that all of the UF_{6} was under IAEA safeguards. Iran was also asked to clarify information about foreign assistance it may have received in connection with a high explosive charge suitable for an implosion type nuclear device. Iran stated that there had been no such activities in Iran.

The IAEA reported that it had held a series of meetings with Iranian officials to resolve the outstanding issues including the "alleged studies" into nuclear weaponization which were listed in the May 2008 IAEA report. During the course of these meetings, the Iranians filed a series of written responses including a 117-page presentation which confirmed the partial veracity of some of the allegations, but which asserted that the allegations as a whole were based on "forged" documents and "fabricated" data, and that Iran had not actually received the documentation substantiating the allegations. According to the August 2007 "Modalities Agreement" between Iran and the IAEA, Iran had agreed to review and assess the "alleged studies" claims, as good faith gesture, "upon receiving all related documents."

While once again expressing "regret" that the IAEA was not able to provide Iran with copies of the documentation concerning the alleged studies, the report urged Iran to provide the IAEA with "substantive information to support its statements and provide access to relevant documentation and individuals" regarding the alleged studies, as a "matter of transparency". The IAEA submitted a number of proposals to Iran to help resolve the allegations and expressed a willingness to discuss modalities that could enable Iran to demonstrate credibly that the activities referred to in the documentation were not nuclear-related, as Iran asserted, while protecting sensitive information related to its conventional military activities. The report does not indicate whether Iran accepted or rejected these proposals.

The report reiterated that IAEA inspectors had found "no evidence on the actual design or manufacture by Iran of nuclear material components of a nuclear weapon or of certain other key components, such as initiators, or on related nuclear physics studies ... Nor has the Agency detected the actual use of nuclear material in connection with the alleged studies" but insisted that the IAEA would not be able to formally verify the peaceful nature of Iran's nuclear program unless Iran had agreed to adopt the requested "transparency measures."

==== February 2009 report ====
In a February 2009 report to the Board of Governors, ElBaradei reported that Iran continued to enrich uranium contrary to the decisions of the Security Council and had produced over a ton of low enriched uranium. Results of environmental samples taken by the IAEA at the FEP and PFEP5 indicated that the plants have been operating at levels declared by Tehran, "within the measurement uncertainties normally associated with enrichment plants of a similar throughput." The IAEA was also able to confirm there was no ongoing reprocessing related activities at Iran's Tehran Research Reactor and Xenon Radioisotope Production Facility.

According to the report, Iran also continued to refuse to provide design information or access to verify design information for its IR-40 heavy water research reactor. Iran and the IAEA in February 2003 agreed to modify a provision in the Subsidiary Arrangement to its safeguards agreement (Code 3.1) to require such access. Iran told the IAEA in March 2007 that it "suspended" the implementation of the modified Code 3.1, which had been "accepted in 2003, but not yet ratified by the parliament", and that it would "revert" to the implementation of the 1976 version of Code 3.1. The subsidiary arrangement may only be modified by mutual agreement.

Iran said that since the reactor is not in a position to receive nuclear material the IAEA's request for access was not justified, and requested that the IAEA not schedule an inspection to verify design information. The IAEA says its right to verify design information provided to it is a "continuing right, which is not dependent on the stage of construction of, or the presence of nuclear material at, a facility."

Regarding the "alleged studies" into nuclear weaponization, the IAEA said that "as a result of the continued lack of cooperation by Iran in connection with the remaining issues which give rise to concerns about possible military dimensions of Iran's nuclear programme, the Agency has not made any substantive progress on these issues" and called on member states which had provided information about the alleged programs to allow the information to be shared with Iran. IAEA said Iran's continued refusal to implement the Additional Protocol was contrary to the request of the Board of Governors and the Security Council and that it was able to continue to verify the non-diversion of declared nuclear material in Iran. Iran said that for the six years the Agency had been considering its case, the IAEA had not found any evidence to prove that Tehran is seeking a nuclear weapon.

Regarding the IAEA report, several news reports suggested that Iran had failed to properly report the amount of LEU it possessed because Iranian estimates did not match the IAEA inspector's findings, and that Iran now had enough uranium to make a nuclear bomb. The reporting was widely criticized as unjustifiably provocative and hyped. In response to the controversy, IAEA spokesman Melissa Fleming asserted that the IAEA had no reason at all to believe that the estimates of low-enriched uranium produced by Iran were an intentional error, and that no nuclear material could be removed from the facility for further enrichment to make nuclear weapons without the agency's knowledge since the facility is subject to video surveillance and the nuclear material is kept under seal.

Ali Asghar Soltaniyeh, Iran's Ambassador to the IAEA, said the February report failed to "provide any new insight into Iran's nuclear program." He asserted the report was written in a way which clearly causes misunderstanding in public opinion. He suggested the reports should be written to have a section about whether Iran has fulfilled its NPT obligations and a separate section for whether "fulfillment of Additional Protocol or sub-arrangements 1 and 3 are beyond the commitment or not."

In a February 2009 press interview, ElBaradei said Iran has low enriched uranium, but "that doesn't mean that they are going tomorrow to have nuclear weapons, because as long as they are under IAEA verification, as long as they are not weaponizing, you know." ElBaradei continued that there is a confidence deficit with Iran, but that the concern should not be hyped and that "many other countries are enriching uranium without the world making any fuss about it."

In February 2009, ElBaradei reportedly said that he believed the possibility of a military attack on Iran's nuclear installations had been ruled out. "Force can only be used as a last option ... when all other political possibilities have been exhausted," he told Radio France International. Former Director General Hans Blix criticized Western governments for the years lost by their "ineffective approaches" to Iran's nuclear program. Blix suggested the West offer "guarantees against attacks from the outside and subversive activities inside" and also suggested US involvement in regional diplomacy "would offer Iran a greater incentive to reach a nuclear agreement than the Bush team's statements that 'Iran must behave itself'."

==== August 2009 report ====
In July 2009, the incoming head of the IAEA, Yukiya Amano, said: "I don't see any evidence in IAEA official documents" that Iran is trying to gain the ability to develop nuclear arms.

In September 2009, ElBaradei said that Iran had broken the law by not disclosing the Fordow Uranium Enrichment Plant, its second uranium enrichment site near Qom sooner. Nevertheless, he said, the United Nations did not have credible evidence that Iran had an operational nuclear program.

==== November 2009 report ====
In November 2009, 25 members of the IAEA's 35-nation Board of Governors approved a demand of the US, Russia, China, and three other powers that Iran immediately stop building its newly revealed nuclear facility and freeze uranium enrichment. Iranian officials shrugged off the resolution, but the US and its allies hinted at new UN sanctions if Iran remained defiant.

==== February 2010 report ====
In February 2010, the IAEA reported that Iran had failed to explain purchases of sensitive technology as well as secret tests of high-precision detonators and modified designs of missile cones to accommodate larger payloads, experiments closely associated with atomic warheads.

==== May 2010 report ====
In May 2010, the IAEA reported that Iran had declared production of over 2.5 metric tons of LEU, which would be enough if further enriched to make two nuclear weapons, and that Iran has refused to answer inspectors’ questions on a variety of activities, including what the agency called the "possible military dimensions" of Iran's nuclear program.

In July 2010, Iran barred two IAEA inspectors from entering the country. The IAEA rejected Iran's reasons for the ban and said it fully supported the inspectors, which Tehran had accused of reporting wrongly that some nuclear equipment was missing.

In August 2010, the IAEA said Iran has started using a second set of 164 centrifuges linked in a cascade to enrich uranium to up to 20% at its Natanz Pilot Fuel Enrichment Plant.

==== November 2011 report ====
In November 2011, the IAEA reported that inspectors had found credible evidence that Iran had been conducting experiments aimed at designing a nuclear bomb until 2003, and that research may have continued on a smaller scale after that time. IAEA Director Yukiya Amano said evidence gathered by the agency "indicates that Iran has carried out activities relevant to the development of a nuclear explosive device." A number of Western nuclear experts stated there was very little new in the report, and that media reports had exaggerated its significance. Iran charged that the report was unprofessional and unbalanced, and had been prepared with undue political influence primarily by the United States.

In November 2011, IAEA officials identified a "large explosive containment vessel" inside Parchin. The IAEA later assessed that Iran had been conducting experiments to develop nuclear weapons capability.

The IAEA Board of Governors passed a resolution by a vote of 32–2 that expressed "deep and increasing concern" over the possible military dimensions to Iran's nuclear program and calling it "essential" that Iran provide additional information and access to the IAEA. The United States welcomed the resolution and said it would step up sanctions to press Iran to change course. In response to the IAEA resolution, Iran threatened to reduce its cooperation with the IAEA, though Iranian Foreign Minister Ali Akbar Salehi played down talk of withdrawal from the NPT or the IAEA.

==== February 2012 report ====
On 24 February 2012, IAEA Director General Amano reported to the IAEA Board of Governors that high-level IAEA delegations had met twice with Iranian officials to intensify efforts to resolve outstanding issues, but that major differences remained and Iran did not grant IAEA requests for access to the Parchin site, where the IAEA believes high-explosives research pertinent to nuclear weapons may have taken place. Iran dismissed the IAEA's report on the possible military dimensions to its nuclear program as based on "unfounded allegations." Amano called on Iran to agree to a structure approach, based on IAEA verification practices, to resolve outstanding issues. In March 2012, Iran said it would allow another inspection at Parchin "when an agreement is made on a modality plan." Not long after, it was reported that Iran might not consent to unfettered access. An ISIS study of satellite imagery claimed to have identified an explosive site at Parchin.

The February IAEA report also described progress in Iran's enrichment and fuel fabrication efforts, including a tripling of the number of cascades enriching uranium to nearly 20 percent and testing of fuel elements for the Tehran Research Reactor and the still incomplete IR-40 heavy water research reactor. Though Iran was continuing to install thousands of additional centrifuges, these were based on an erratic and outdated design, both in its main enrichment plant at Natanz and in a smaller facility at Fordow buried deep underground. "It appears that they are still struggling with the advanced centrifuges," said Olli Heinonen, a former chief nuclear inspector, while nuclear expert Mark Fitzpatrick pointed out that Iran had been working on "second-generation models for over ten years now and still can't put them into large-scale operation". Peter Crail and Daryl G. Kimball of the Arms Control Association commented that the report "does not identify any breakthroughs" and "confirms initial impressions that Iran's announcements last week on a series of 'nuclear advances' were hyped."

==== May 2012 report ====
In May 2012, the IAEA reported that Iran had increased its rate of production of low-enriched uranium enriched to 3.5 percent and to expand its stockpile of uranium enriched to 19.75 percent, but was having difficulty with more advanced centrifuges. The IAEA reported detecting particles of uranium enriched to 27 percent at the Fordow enrichment facility. However, a diplomat in Vienna cautioned that the spike in uranium purity found by inspectors could turn out to be accidental. This change drastically moved Iran's uranium toward bomb-grade material. Until then, the highest level of purity that had been found in Iran was 20 percent.

==== August 2012 report ====
In late August, the IAEA set up an Iran Task Force to deal with inspections and other issues related to Iran's nuclear program, in an attempt to focus and streamline the IAEA's handling of Iran's nuclear program by concentrating experts and other resources into one dedicated team.

On 30 August, the IAEA released a report showing a major expansion of Iranian enrichment activities. The report said that Iran has more than doubled the number of centrifuges at the underground facility at Fordow, from 1,064 centrifuges in May to 2,140 centrifuges in August, though the number of operating centrifuges had not increased. The report said that since 2010 Iran had produced about 190 kg of 20-per-cent-enriched uranium, up from 145 kg in May. The report also noted that Iran had converted some of the 20-per-cent-enriched uranium to an oxide form and fabricated into fuel for use in research reactors, and that once this conversion and fabrication have taken place, the fuel cannot be readily enriched to weapon-grade purity.

The report also expressed concerns over Parchin, which the IAEA has sought to inspect for evidence of nuclear weapons development. Since the IAEA requested access, "significant ground scraping and landscaping have been undertaken over an extensive area at and around the location," five buildings had been demolished, while power lines, fences, and paved roads were removed, all of which would hamper the IAEA investigation if it were granted access.

In a briefing to the Board of Governors on this report in early September 2012, IAEA Deputy Director General Herman Nackaerts and Assistant Director General Rafael Grossi displayed satellite images for its member states which allegedly demonstrate Iranian efforts to remove incriminating evidence from its facility at Parchin, or a "nuclear clean-up." These images showed a building at Parchin covered in what appeared to be a pink tarpaulin, as well as demolition of building and removal of earth that the IAEA said would "significantly hamper" its investigation. A senior Western diplomat described the presentation as "pretty compelling." The Institute for Science and International Security (ISIS) said that the purpose of the pink tarpaulin could be to hide further "clean-up work" from satellites. However, Ali Asghar Soltanieh, Iran's envoy to the IAEA, denied the contents of the presentation, saying that "merely having a photo from up there, a satellite imagery ... this is not the way the agency should do its professional job."

According to the Associated Press, the IAEA received "new and significant intelligence" by September 2012, which four diplomats confirmed was the basis for a passage in the August 2012 IAEA report that "the agency has obtained more information which further corroborates" suspicions. The intelligence reportedly indicates that Iran had advanced work on computer modeling of the performance of a nuclear warhead, work David Albright of ISIS said was "critical to the development of a nuclear weapon." The intelligence boosted fears by the IAEA that Iran has advanced its weapons research on multiple fronts, as computer modeling is usually accompanied by physical tests of the components which would enter a nuclear weapon.

On 13 September, in response to this report, the IAEA Board of Governors passed a resolution that rebuked Iran for defying UN Security Council resolutions to suspend uranium enrichment and called on Iran to allow inspections of evidence that it is pursuing weapons technology. The resolution, which passed by a vote of 31–1 with 3 abstentions, also expressed "serious concerns" about Iran's nuclear program while desiring a peaceful resolution. Senior United States diplomat Robert Wood blamed Iran for "systematically demolishing" a facility at the Parchin military base, which IAEA inspectors have attempted to visit in the past, but were not granted access, saying "Iran has been taking measures that appear consistent with an effort to remove evidence of its past activities at Parchin." The resolution was introduced jointly by China, France, Germany, Russia, the United States, and the United Kingdom.

==== November 2012 report ====
In November 2012, the IAEA released a report showing continued expansion in Iranian uranium enrichment capabilities. At Fordow, all 2,784 IR-1 centrifuges (16 cascades of 174 each) have been installed, though only 4 cascades are operating and another 4 are fully equipped, vacuum-tested, and ready to begin operating. Iran has produced approximately 233 kg of near-20 percent enriched uranium, an increase of 43 kg since the August 2012 IAEA report.

The IAEA August 2012 report stated that Iran had begun to use 96 kg of its near-20 percent enriched uranium to fabricate fuel for the Tehran Research Reactor, which makes it more difficult to further enrich that uranium to weapons grade, since it would first need to be converted back to uranium hexafluoride gas. Though more of this uranium has been fabricated into fuel, no additional uranium has been sent to the Fuel Plate Fabrication Plant at Isfahan.

The November report noted that Iran has continued to deny the IAEA access to the military site at Parchin. Citing evidence from satellite imagery that "Iran constructed a large explosives containment vessel in which to conduct hydrodynamic experiments" relevant to nuclear weapons development, the report expresses concern that changes taking place at the Parchin military site might eliminate evidence of past nuclear activities, noting that there had been virtually no activity at that location between February 2005 and the time the IAEA requested access. Those changes include:

- Frequent presence of equipment, trucks and personnel.
- Large amounts of liquid run-off.
- Removal of external pipework.
- Razing and removal of five other buildings or structures and the site perimeter fence.
- Reconfiguration of electrical and water supply.
- Shrouding of the containment vessel building.
- Scraping and removal of large quantities of earth and the depositing of new earth in its place.

Iran said that the IR-40 heavy water research reactor at Arak was expected begin to operate in the first quarter of 2014. During on-site inspections of the IR-40 design, IAEA inspectors observed that the installation of cooling and moderator circuit piping was continuing.

==== February 2013 report ====
On 21 February, the IAEA released a report showing continued expansion in Iranian uranium enrichment capabilities. As of 19 February, 12,699 IR-1 centrifuges have been installed at Natanz. This includes the installation of 2,255 centrifuges since the previous IAEA report in November.

Fordow, the nuclear facility near Qom, contains 16 cascades, equally divided between Unit 1 and Unit 2, with a total of 2,710 centrifuges. Iran is continuing to operate the four cascades of 174 IR-1 centrifuges each in two tandem sets to produce 19.75 percent LEU in a total of 696 enriching centrifuges, the same number of centrifuges enriching as was reported in November 2012.

Iran has produced approximately 280 kg of near-20 percent enriched uranium, an increase of 47 kg since the November 2012 IAEA report and the total 3.5 percent LEU production stands at 8,271 kg (compared to 7,611 kg reported during the last quarter).

The IAEA February 2013 report stated that Iran had resumed reconverting near-20 percent enriched uranium into Oxide form to fabricate fuel for the Tehran Research Reactor, which makes it more difficult to further enrich that uranium to weapons grade, since it would first need to be converted back to UF_{6} gas.

The February report noted that Iran has continued to deny the IAEA access to the military site at Parchin. Citing evidence from satellite imagery that "Iran constructed a large explosives containment vessel in which to conduct hydrodynamic experiments". Such installation could be an indicator of nuclear weapons development. The report expresses concern that changes taking place at the Parchin military site might eliminate evidence of past nuclear activities, noting that there had been virtually no activity at that location between February 2005 and the time the IAEA requested access. Those changes include:

- Reinstatement of some of the chamber building's features, for example wall panels and exhaust piping.
- Alterations to the roofs of the chamber building and the other large building.
- Dismantlement and reconstruction of the annex to the other large building.
- Construction of one small building at the same place where a building of similar size had previously been demolished.
- Spreading, leveling and compacting of another layer of material over a large area.
- Installation of a fence that divides the location into two areas. Most of these activities have also been documented by ISIS in satellite imagery reports, dated 29 November 2012, 12 December 2012 and 25 January 2013.

Iran said that the IR-40 heavy water-moderated research reactor at Arak was expected begin to operate in the first quarter of 2014. During on-site inspections of the IR-40 design, IAEA inspectors observed that the previously reported installation of cooling and moderator circuit piping was almost complete. The IAEA reported that Iran will use the Tehran Research Reactor to test fuel for the IR-40 reactor, which the UN Security Council has demanded that Iran stop building because it could be used to produce plutonium for nuclear weapons. The IAEA report states that "on 26 November 2012, the Agency verified a prototype IR-40 natural uranium fuel assembly before its transfer to TRR for irradiation testing." Since its last visit on 17 August 2011, the Agency has not been provided with further access to the plant so is relying on satellite imagery to monitor the status of the plant.

==== March 2015 report ====
In March 2015, IAEA Director General Amano reported that Iran did not provide sufficient access or information to resolve a dozen issues related to the possible military dimensions of its nuclear program, giving only very limited information on only one of those issues.

==== December 2015 report ====
In December 2015, the IAEA issued a report concluding:

The Agency assesses that a range of activities relevant to the development of a nuclear explosive device were conducted in Iran prior to the end of 2003 as a coordinated effort, and some activities took place after 2003. The Agency also assesses that these activities did not advance beyond feasibility and scientific studies, and the acquisition of certain relevant technical competences and capabilities. The Agency has no credible indications of activities in Iran relevant to the development of a nuclear explosive device after 2009.

Following this report, the IAEA Board of Governors passed a resolution closing its consideration of the issues in the report and terminating previous resolutions about Iran.

==== December 2020 report ====
In December 2020, the IAEA reported that Tehran "holds more than 12 times the amount of enriched uranium" permitted under the JCPOA, and that "work has also begun on the construction of new underground facilities close to Natanz, its main enrichment facility".

==== 2021 ====
Until 2021, Iran consistently asserted that its nuclear program was solely for peaceful purposes, reinforced by a fatwa issued by Ayatollah Khamenei against the development of nuclear weapons. But in an interview in November 2021, on the anniversary of the assassination of Mohsen Fakhrizadeh, former head of the Atomic Energy Organization of Iran Fereydoon Abbasi mentioned the country's growth "involving satellites, missiles, and nuclear weapons" and said that although Iran's stance on nuclear weapons being haram was quite clear, Fakhrizadeh had "created this system."

==== October 2023 report ====
As of 2023, the IAEA stated in an October quarterly report that Iran is estimated to have further increased its uranium stockpile twenty-two times over the 2015 agreed JCPOA limit. The IAEA also noted that Iran has continued to push back against inspections of its nuclear program and several inspectors had been barred by Iran, a move that received condemnation by the agency.

== Iranian views ==
Interviews and surveys show that the majority of Iranians in all groups favor their country's nuclear program. Polls in 2008 showed that the vast majority of Iranians want their country to develop nuclear energy, and 90% of Iranians believe it is important (including 81% very important) for Iran "to have a full fuel cycle nuclear program." Though Iranians are not Arab, Arab publics in six countries also believe that Iran has the right to its nuclear program and should not be pressured to stop that program.

A September 2010 poll by the International Peace Institute found that 71% of Iranians favored the development of nuclear weapons, a drastic hike over the previous polls by the same agency. However, in July 2012, a poll on an Iranian state-run media outlet found that 2/3 Iranians support suspending uranium enrichment in return for a gradual easing of sanctions. Meir Javedanfar, an Iranian-born commentator with the Middle East Economic and Political Analysis Company, stated that while Iranians may want nuclear energy, they don't want it at the price the government is willing to pay.

In 2005, in explaining why it had left its enrichment program undeclared to the IAEA, Iran said that for the past twenty-four years it has "been subject to the most severe series of sanctions and export restrictions on material and technology for peaceful nuclear technology," so that some elements of its program had to be done discreetly. Iran said the US intention "is nothing but to make this deprivation" of Iran's inalienable right to enrichment technology "final and eternal," and that the United States is completely silent on Israel's nuclear enrichment and weapons program.

Iran began its nuclear research as early as 1975, when France cooperated with Iran to set up the Esfahan Nuclear Technology Center (ENTC) to provide training for personnel to develop certain nuclear fuel cycle capabilities. Iran did not hide other elements of its nuclear program. For example, its efforts at mining and converting uranium were announced on national radio, and Iran also says that in consultation with the Agency and member states throughout the 1990s it underlined its plans to acquire, for exclusively peaceful purposes, fuel enrichment technology.

Iran's contracts with other nations to obtain nuclear reactors were also known to the IAEA – but support for the contracts was withdrawn after "a U.S. special national intelligence estimate declared that while 'Iran's much publicized nuclear power intentions are entirely in the planning stage,' the ambitions of the Shah could lead Iran to pursue nuclear weapons, especially in the shadow of India's successful nuclear test in May 1974". In 2003, the IAEA reported that Iran had failed to meet its obligations to report some of its enrichment activities, which Iran says began in 1985, to the IAEA as required by its safeguards agreement. The IAEA further reported that Iran had undertaken to submit the required information for agency verification and "to implement a policy of co-operation and full transparency" as corrective actions.

The Iranian government has repeatedly made compromise offers to place limits on its nuclear program beyond what the Non-Proliferation Treaty and the Additional Protocol require of Iran, in order to ensure that the program cannot be secretly diverted to the manufacture of weapons. These offers have included operating Iran's nuclear program as an international consortium, with the full participation of foreign governments. This offer by the Iranians matched a proposed solution put forth by an IAEA expert committee that was investigating the risk that civilian nuclear technologies could be used to make bombs. Iran has also offered to renounce plutonium extraction technology, thus ensuring that its heavy water reactor at Arak cannot be used to make bombs either.

In 2007, the Iranians reportedly offered to operate uranium centrifuges that automatically self-destruct if they are used to enrich uranium beyond what is required for civilian purposes. However, despite offers of nuclear cooperation by the five permanent members of the UN Security Council and Germany, Iran has refused to suspend its enrichment program as the council has demanded. Iran's representative asserted that dealing with the issue in the Security Council was unwarranted and void of any legal basis or practical utility because its peaceful nuclear program posed no threat to international peace and security, and, that it ran counter to the views of the majority of United Nations Member States, which the council was obliged to represent.

In August 2006, Iranian President Mahmoud Ahmadinejad told a crowd that "They should know that the Iranian nation will not yield to pressure and will not let its rights be trampled on," , in a televised speech in the northwestern city of Orumiyeh. In front of his strongest supporters in one of his provincial power bases, the Iranian leader attacked what he called "intimidation" by the UN, which he said was led by the US. Ahmadinejad criticized a White House rebuff of his offer for a televised debate with President Bush. "They say they support dialog and the free flow of information," he said. "But when debate was proposed, they avoided and opposed it." Ahmadinejad said that sanctions "cannot dissuade Iranians from their decision to make progress," according to Iran's state-run IRNA news agency. "On the contrary, many of our successes, including access to the nuclear fuel cycle and producing of heavy water, have been achieved under sanctions."

Iran insists enrichment activities are intended for peaceful purposes, but much of the West, including the United States, allege that Iran is pursuing nuclear weapons, or a nuclear weapons "capability". 31 August 2006, deadline called for Iran to comply with UN Security Council Resolution 1696 and suspend its enrichment-related activities or face the possibility of economic sanctions. The United States believes the council will agree to implement sanctions when high-level ministers reconvene in mid-September, US Undersecretary of State Nicholas Burns said. "We're sure going to work toward that [sanctions] with a great deal of energy and determination because this cannot go unanswered," Burns said. "The Iranians are obviously proceeding with their nuclear research; they are doing things that the International Atomic Energy Agency does not want them to do, the Security Council doesn't want them to do. There has to be an international answer, and we believe there will be one."

Iran asserts that there is no legal basis for Iran's referral to the United Nations Security Council since the IAEA has not proven that previously undeclared activities had a relationship to a weapons program, and that all nuclear material in Iran (including material that may not have been declared) had been accounted for and had not been diverted to military purposes. Article XII.C of the IAEA Statute requires a report to the UN Security Council for any safeguards noncompliance. The IAEA Board of Governors, in a rare non-consensus decision with 12 abstentions, decided that "Iran's many failures and breaches of its obligations to comply with its NPT Safeguards Agreement" as reported by the IAEA in November 2003 constituted "non-compliance" under the terms of Article XII.C of IAEA Statute.

Iran also minimizes the significance of the IAEA's inability to verify the exclusively peaceful nature of Iran's nuclear program, arguing the IAEA has only drawn such conclusions in a subset of states that have ratified and implemented the Additional Protocol. The IAEA has been able to verify the non-diversion of declared nuclear material in Iran, but not the absence of undeclared activities. According to the IAEA's Safeguards Statement for 2007, of the 82 states where both NPT safeguards and an Additional Protocol are implemented, the IAEA had found no indication of undeclared nuclear activity in 47 states, while evaluations of possible undeclared nuclear activity remained ongoing in 35 states.

Iran ceased implementation of the Additional Protocol and all other cooperation with the IAEA beyond that required under its safeguards agreement after the IAEA Board of Governors decided to report its safeguards non-compliance to the UN Security Council in February 2006. Iran insisted that such cooperation had been "voluntary," but on 26 December 2006, the UN Security Council passed Resolution 1737, invoking Chapter VII of the UN Charter, which among other things required Iran to cooperate fully with the IAEA, "beyond the formal requirements of the Safeguards Agreement and Additional Protocol."

In November 2008, the IAEA reported that, while it is "able to continue to verify the non-diversion of declared nuclear material in Iran," it "has not been able to make substantive progress" on "key remaining issues of serious concern" because of a "lack of cooperation by Iran." Iran has maintained that the Security Council's engagement in "the issue of the peaceful nuclear activities of the Islamic Republic of Iran" are unlawful and malicious. Iran also argues that the UN Security Council resolutions demanding a suspension of enrichment constitute a violation of Article IV of the Non-Proliferation Treaty which recognizes the inalienable right of signatory nations to nuclear technology "for peaceful purposes."

Iran agreed to implement the Additional Protocol under the terms of the October 2003 Tehran agreement and its successor, the November 2004 Paris agreement, and did so for two years before withdrawing from the Paris agreement in early 2006 following the breakdown of negotiations with the EU-3. Since then, Iran has offered not only to ratify the Additional Protocol, but to implement transparency measures on its nuclear program that exceed the Additional Protocol, as long as its right to operate an enrichment program is recognized. The UN Security Council, however, insists that Iran must suspend all enrichment-related and reprocessing activities, and the United States explicitly ruled out the possibility that it would allow Iran to produce its own nuclear fuel, even under intense international inspection.

Inside Iran there was opposition to its nuclear energy policy. On 20 February 2007, a small radical reformist political party, the Islamic Revolutionary Mujahadin Organisation, complained that Iran's drive to produce nuclear energy has endangered national security, the national interest and the destiny of the Iranian people.

On 9 April 2007, Iran announced that it had begun enriching uranium with 3,000 centrifuges, presumably at Natanz enrichment site. "With great honor, I declare that as of today our dear country has joined the nuclear club of nations and can produce nuclear fuel on an industrial scale", said Ahmadinejad.

On 22 April 2007, Iranians foreign ministry spokesman Mohammad Ali Hosseini announced that his country rules out enrichment suspension ahead of talks with EU foreign policy chief Javier Solana on 25 April 2007.

Reacting to the November 2009 IAEA Board of Governors resolution demanding that Iran immediately stop building its newly revealed nuclear facility and freeze uranium enrichment, Foreign Ministry spokesman Ramin Mehmanparast described the resolution as a "show ... aimed at putting pressure on Iran, which will be useless." The Iranian government subsequently authorized the country's Atomic Energy Organization to begin building ten more uranium-enrichment plants for enhancing the country's electricity production.

On 1 December 2009, Iranian President Mahmoud Ahmadinejad brushed aside the threat of UN sanctions over his country's failure to accept a UN-proposed deal on its nuclear program, stating that such a move by western nations would not hinder Iran's nuclear program. Ahmadinejad told state television that he believed further negotiations with world powers over his country's nuclear program were not needed, describing warnings by Western powers that Iran would be isolated if it fails to accept the UN-proposed deal as "ridiculous."

On 21 August 2010, watched by senior officials from Iran and Russia, Iran began fueling Bushehr I, Iranian state media reported, in an effort to help create nuclear-generated electricity. While state media reported it will take about two months for the reactor to begin generating electricity, Russia's nuclear agency says it will take longer. Ayatollah Ali Khamenei, Iran's supreme leader, recently asserted Iran's right to establish nuclear plants.

On 17 September 2012, speaking at the IAEA General Conference, Iranian nuclear chief Fereydoon Abbasi attacked the IAEA, saying that "terrorists and saboteurs" had possibly infiltrated the IAEA in order to derail Iran's nuclear program. Abbasi said that on 17 August 2012, an underground enrichment plant was sabotaged, and IAEA inspectors arrived in Iran to inspect it soon after. The Associated Press noted that his comments reflected a determination in Iran to continue defying international pressure regarding its nuclear program. Mark Fitzpatrick of the International Institute for Strategic Studies said that Iran's accusations regarding the IAEA "are a new low. Increasingly cornered, they are lashing out wildly." Abassi's allegations were viewed by some Western experts as providing a potential pretext for Iran to officially downgrade its level of cooperation with the IAEA.

Abbasi also met separately with Director General Amano, after which the IAEA pressed Iran to address concerns in its nuclear program, and said that the IAEA was ready for negotiations soon. The IAEA did not comment on Abbasi's statements regarding "terrorists and saboteurs," but did say that it was vital that Iran cooperate with IAEA inspectors in order to clarify suspicions regarding its nuclear program. In an interview on the sidelines of the IAEA General Conference. Abbasi was quoted as saying that Iran had intentionally provided false information about its nuclear program to mislead western intelligence. Abbasi, who had been an assassination target in 2010, said Iran sometimes exaggerated and sometimes understated its progress.

The negotiations between Ahmadinejad's government and the P5+1 group did not end the dispute due to Iran's firm stance on not suspending uranium enrichment. At the same time, the top clerics in Tehran felt Ahmadinejad's firm standing against the West would destabilize their regime. Ahmadinejad had some tendency toward Iranian nationalism, which deviated from the clerics' theocratic rule. Hence they labeled the faction associated with him as "deviant current". When Ahmadinejad became a lame duck president in the last year of his second term (2012–2013), the clerics bypassed him and the Majlis, and tried to negotiate secretly with US officials. They sent a separate team to Muscat to negotiate a nuclear deal through a back channel with the White House. Oman's Sultan Qaboos bin Said acted as mediator between the two governments.

In September 2013, in an interview with The Washington Post, the newly elected President of Iran Hassan Rouhani said that he wanted a resolution to the nuclear issue within "months, not years." Rouhani said he saw the nuclear issue as a "beginning point" for US–Iran relations.

On 12 April 2022, Iran's supreme leader said on Tuesday that his country's future should not be linked to the success or failure of nuclear discussions with international powers, according to Iranian state media, adding that efforts to resurrect a 2015 nuclear deal "are progressing well."

In April 2022, former Iranian MP Ali Motahari admitted that Iran aimed to make a nuclear bomb from the very beginning of its nuclear program. A day later, he said he meant "creation" of atomic bomb to frighten the enemy is alright, as Quran says "frighten thereby the enemy of Allah", but "use" of it (to actually attack the enemy) should be forbidden.

In June 2022, Iran promised on Friday to respond "immediately" to any action taken against it by the United States and European countries at the United Nations' nuclear watchdog IAEA, according to Iranian official media.

== US views ==
On 31 August 2006, President George W. Bush insisted that "there must be consequences" for Iran's defiance of demands that it stop enriching uranium. He asserted "the world now faces a grave threat from the radical regime in Iran. The Iranian regime arms, funds, and advises Hezbollah." The IAEA issued a report saying Iran had not suspended its uranium enrichment activities, a United Nations official said. This report opened the way for UN Security Council sanctions against Iran. Facing a Security Council deadline to stop its uranium enrichment activities, Iran has left little doubt it will defy the West and continue its nuclear program.

A 23 August 2006 congressional report summarized the documentary history of Iran's nuclear program, but also made allegations against the IAEA. The IAEA responded with a strongly worded letter to then US House Intelligence Committee Chairman Peter Hoekstra, which labeled as "outrageous and dishonest" the report's allegation that an IAEA inspector was dismissed for violating a supposed IAEA policy against "telling the whole truth" about Iran and pointed out other factual errors, such as a claim that Iran had enriched "weapons-grade" uranium.

On 31 August 2006, John Bolton, then US ambassador to the UN, said that he expected action to impose sanctions to begin immediately after the deadline passed, with meetings of high-level officials in the coming days, followed by negotiations on the language of the sanctions resolution. Bolton said that when the deadline passed "a little flag will go up." "In terms of what happens afterward, at that point, if they have not suspended all uranium enrichment activities, they will not be in compliance with the resolution," he said. "And at that point, the steps that the foreign ministers have agreed upon previously ... we would begin to talk about how to implement those steps."

The five permanent members of the Security Council, plus Germany, previously offered Iran a package of incentives aimed at getting the country to restart negotiations, but Iran refused to halt its nuclear activities first. Incentives included offers to improve Iran's access to the international economy through participation in groups such as the World Trade Organization and to modernize its telecommunications industry. The incentives also mentioned the possibility of lifting restrictions on US and European manufacturers wanting to export civil aircraft to Iran. And a proposed long-term agreement accompanying the incentives offered a "fresh start in negotiations."

In a 2007 National Intelligence Estimate, the United States Intelligence Community assessed that Iran had ended all "nuclear weapon design and weaponization work" in 2003.

In 2007, IAEA officials complained that most US intelligence shared with it to date about Iran's nuclear program proved to be inaccurate, and that none had led to significant discoveries inside Iran through that time.

In 2008, the United States repeatedly refused to rule out using nuclear weapons in an attack on Iran. The US Nuclear Posture Review made public in 2002 specifically envisioned the use of nuclear weapons on a first strike basis, even against non-nuclear armed states. Investigative reporter Seymour Hersh reported that, according to military officials, the Bush administration had plans for the use of nuclear weapons against "underground Iranian nuclear facilities". When specifically questioned about the potential use of nuclear weapons against Iran, President Bush claimed that "All options were on the table". According to the Bulletin of the Atomic Scientists, Bush "directly threatened Iran with a preemptive nuclear strike. It is hard to read his reply in any other way."

The Iranian authorities consistently replied that they were not seeking nuclear weapons as a deterrent to the United States, and instead emphasize the creation of a nuclear-arms free zone in the Middle East. The policy of using nuclear weapons on a first-strike basis against non-nuclear opponents is a violation of the US Negative Security Assurance pledge not to use nuclear weapons against non-nuclear members of the nuclear Non-Proliferation Treaty (NPT) such as Iran. Threats of the use of nuclear weapons against another country constitute a violation of United Nations Security Council Resolution 984 and the International Court of Justice advisory opinion on the Legality of the Threat or Use of Nuclear Weapons.

In December 2008, President-elect Barack Obama gave an interview on Sunday's "Meet the Press" with host Tom Brokaw during which he said the United States needs to "ratchet up tough but direct diplomacy with Iran". He said in his view the United States needs to make it clear to the Iranians that their alleged development of nuclear weapons and funding of organizations "like Hamas and Hezbollah," and threats against Israel are "unacceptable." Obama supports diplomacy with Iran without preconditions "to pressure Iran to stop their illicit nuclear program". Mohamed ElBaradei welcomed the new stance to talk to Iran as "long overdue". Iran said Obama should apologize for the US bombing of Hiroshima and Nagasaki in World War II and his administration should stop talking to the world and "listen to what others are saying." In his first press interview as president, Obama told Al Arabiya that "if countries like Iran are willing to unclench their fist, they will find an extended hand from us."

In March 2009, US National Intelligence Director Dennis C. Blair and Defense Intelligence Agency Director Lieutenant General Michael D. Maples told a United States Senate Committee on Armed Services hearing that Iran has only low-enriched uranium, which there were no indications it was refining. Their comments countered ones made earlier by an Israeli general and Maples said the United States was arriving at different conclusions from the same facts.

In April 2009, a Manhattan district attorney charged a financier with the suspected misuse of Manhattan banks employed to transfer money between China and Iran by way of Europe and the United States. The materials in question can be used for weapons as well as civilian purposes, but some of the material can potentially be used in making engine nozzles that can withstand fiery temperatures and centrifuges that can enrich uranium into atomic fuel. The charges would carry a maximum of up to a year in jail for fifth-degree conspiracy and a maximum of four years for falsifying business records. David Albright, a nuclear weapons expert who assisted in the prosecution, said that it is impossible to say how Iran used or could use the raw materials it acquired.

In August 2009, a document released by the US State Department's Bureau of Intelligence and Research assessed that Iran was unlikely to have the technical capability to produce HEU (highly enriched uranium) before 2013, and the US intelligence community had no evidence that Iran had yet made the decision to produce highly enriched uranium. In 2009, US intelligence assessed that Iranian intentions were unknown.

In July 2009, Secretary of State Hillary Clinton explicitly ruled out the possibility that the Obama administration would allow Iran to produce its own nuclear fuel, even under intense international inspection.

Following the November 2009 IAEA Board of Governors resolution demanding Iran immediately stop building its newly revealed nuclear facility and freeze uranium enrichment, White House spokesman Robert Gibbs avoided mentioning sanctions but indicated harsher measures were possible unless Iran compromised: "If Iran refuses to meet its obligations, then it will be responsible for its own growing isolation and the consequences." Glyn Davies, the chief US delegate to the IAEA, told reporters: "Six nations ... for the first time came together ...[and] have put together this resolution we all agreed on. That's a significant development."

A 2009 US congressional research paper said that US intelligence believed Iran ended "nuclear weapon design and weaponization work" in 2003. Some advisors within the Obama administration reaffirmed the intelligence conclusions, while other "top advisers" in the Obama administration "say they no longer believe" the key finding of the 2007 National Intelligence Estimate. Thomas Fingar, former Chairman of the National Intelligence Council until December 2008, said that the original 2007 National Intelligence Estimate on Iran "became contentious, in part, because the White House instructed the Intelligence Community to release an unclassified version of the report's key judgments but declined to take responsibility for ordering its release." A National Intelligence Estimate (NIE) is the most authoritative written judgment concerning a national security issue prepared by the Director of Central Intelligence.

In late 2010, the impending opening of the Bushehr I plant prompted the White House to question why Iran is continuing to enrich uranium within its borders. "Russia is providing the fuel, and taking the fuel back out," White House spokesman Robert Gibbs said in August. "It, quite clearly, I think, underscores that Iran does not need its own enrichment capability if its intentions, as it states, are for a peaceful nuclear program," he said.

On 8 January 2012, US Secretary of Defense Leon Panetta said on Face the Nation that Iran was not trying to develop a nuclear weapon, but was trying to develop a nuclear capability. He also urged Israel to work together rather than make a unilateral strike on Iran's nuclear installations. On 1 August 2012, US Defense Secretary Leon Panetta while in Israel said that the United States had "options," including military options, to prevent Iran from attaining a nuclear weapon, should diplomacy fail. In 2012, sixteen US intelligence agencies, including the CIA, reported that Iran was pursuing research that could enable it to produce nuclear weapons, but was not attempting to do so. The senior officers of all of the major American intelligence agencies stated that there was no conclusive evidence that Iran has made any attempt to produce nuclear weapons since 2003.

In January 2013, the Institute for Science and International Security (a US think tank) published a 154-page report by five US experts titled "U.S. Nonproliferation Strategy for the Changing Middle East", which stated that Iran could produce enough weapon-grade uranium for one or more nuclear bombs by the middle of 2014. Therefore, the report recommended that the United States should increase sanctions on Iran in order to curb its ability to develop weapon-grade uranium. The report states: "The president should explicitly declare that he will use military force to destroy Iran's nuclear program if Iran takes additional decisive steps toward producing a bomb."

On 2 February 2013, speaking at the Munich Security Conference, US Vice President Joseph Biden said that the Obama administration "would be prepared to meet bilaterally with the Iranian leadership. We would not make it a secret that we were doing that. We would let our partners know if that occasion presented itself. That offer stands, but it must be real and tangible, and there has to be an agenda that they’re prepared to speak to. We are not just prepared to do it for the exercise." A few days later Iranian supreme leader Ayatollah Ali Khamenei rejected the offer and added ambiguously: "The U.S. policies in the Middle East have failed and the Americans are in need of a winning hand. That is bringing Iran to the negotiating table."

On 4 February, the Italian news-wire "Agenzia Nova", citing "sources in Teheran," reported that "from the beginning of the year Ali Larijani, Speaker of the (Iranian) Parliament, secretly traveled twice to the United States" to launch direct negotiations with the Obama Administration. The Italian Agency explained that US diplomacy was waiting for the Presidential election in Iran, that most probably will see a dramatic change in Iranian approach. It was reported on 17 June Iran's newly elected president Hassan Rohani had expressed readiness for bilateral talks with Washington, with conditions.

In April 2015, hailing the agreement between the P5+1 and Iran on parameters for a comprehensive agreement, President Obama said "the United States, together with our allies and partners, has reached an historic understanding with Iran, which if fully implemented, will prevent it from obtaining a nuclear weapon."

In 2018, Mike Pompeo, US Secretary of State nominee, said he believed that Iran had not been "racing" to develop a nuclear weapon before the finalization of the Iran deal and that it would not do so if the deal were to unravel, although he favored a "fix" of the deal.

In March 2020, Pompeo approved an extension of sanctions waivers, while State Department spokeswoman Morgan Ortagus called the continued expansion of Iran’s nuclear activities "unacceptable." These waivers, which allowed foreign companies to do work at some of Iran’s nuclear sites, were one of the few components of the JCPOA that the administration had not canceled.

In 2021, US Secretary of State Antony Blinken did not rule out a military intervention to stop Iran from obtaining nuclear weapons. In 2022, a French diplomatic source stated that the US is unlikely to agree to remove Iran's elite security force from its list of foreign terrorist organizations anytime soon.

In June 2023, an assessment by the U.S. Director of National Intelligence concluded that Iran was not developing nuclear weapons, though it was improving its nuclear capabilities, reporting that "Iran is not currently undertaking the key nuclear weapons-development activities that would be necessary to produce a testable nuclear device".

== Negotiations between Iran and the P5+1 ==
Iran has held a series of meetings with a group of six countries: China, France, Germany, Russia, United Kingdom, United States. These six are known as the P5+1 (the permanent five members of the UN Security Council plus Germany) or alternatively as the E3+3. These meetings are intended to resolve concerns about Iran's nuclear program.

=== January 2011 Istanbul meeting ===
Negotiations between Iran and the P5+1 were resumed on 21 January 2011 in Istanbul after about a 14-month break. The two-day meetings were led by EU High Representative Catherine Ashton and Iran's chief nuclear negotiator Saeed Jalili. The talks deadlocked after Iran imposed two preconditions: recognition of Iran's right to enrich uranium and dropping the United Nations economic sanctions on Tehran.

=== April 2012 Istanbul meeting ===
The first session of fresh negotiations in April went well, with delegates praising the constructive dialogue and Iran's positive attitude. Israeli Prime Minister Binyamin Netanyahu said, however, that Iran had been given a "freebie", a charge that was sharply rebutted by Barack Obama. In the lead up to the second round of negotiations in May, and in what may foreshadow a significant concession, an unnamed senior US official hinted the United States might accept Iran enriching uranium to five percent so long as the Iranians agreed to tough international oversight of the process. The US shift was reportedly made for the pragmatic reason that unconditional demands for zero enrichment would make it impossible to reach a negotiated deal.

Netanyahu had insisted a few days before that he would tolerate no enrichment, not even to the three percent required for nuclear power. In a shift on the Iranian side, April saw members of the Iranian Islamic Revolutionary Guard Corps urging Ayatollah Ali Khamenei to maintain a policy of keeping uranium enrichment at or below 20 percent.

The EU's High Representative for Foreign Affairs Catherine Ashton felt compelled to make a special visit to Netanyahu, partly to keep him from again voicing his negativity and opposition to the negotiations. At the meeting, which included Avigdor Lieberman, Ehud Barak and Shaul Mofaz, the Israelis demanded a guaranteed timetable for cessation of all uranium enrichment by Iran, the removal of all enriched uranium, and the dismantlement of the underground facility at Fordo. Otherwise, they said, Iran would use the talks to buy time.

== Second enrichment plant ==
On 21 September 2009, Iran informed the IAEA that it was constructing a second enrichment facility. On 22 September, IAEA Director General ElBaradei informed the United States. On 24 September, the United States, United Kingdom and France briefed the IAEA on an enrichment facility under construction at an underground location at Fordow, 42 kilometres (26 mi) north of Qom.

On 25 September, at the G-20 Summit, the three countries criticized Iran for again concealing a nuclear facility from the IAEA. The United States said that the facility, which was still months from completion, was too small to be useful for a civil program but could produce enough high-enriched uranium for one bomb per year.

Iran said the plant was for peaceful purposes and would take between a year and a half to two years to complete, and that the notice Iran had given had exceeded the 180 days before insertion of nuclear materials the IAEA safeguards agreement that Iran was following required. Iran agreed to allow IAEA inspections. Iran's nuclear chief, Ali Akbar Salehi, said the site was built for maximum protection from aerial attack: carved into a mountain and near a military compound of the powerful Revolutionary Guard.

Also in October, the United States, France, and Russia proposed a UN-drafted deal to Iran regarding its nuclear program, in an effort to find a compromise between Iran's stated need for a nuclear reactor and international concerns that Iran harbors a secret intent on developing a nuclear weapon. After some delay in responding, on 29 October, Ahmadinejad voiced an openness towards cooperation with other world powers. "We welcome fuel exchange, nuclear co-operation, building of power plants and reactors and we are ready to co-operate," he said in a live broadcast on state television. However, he added that Iran would not retreat "one iota" on its right to a sovereign nuclear program.

In November 2009, the IAEA Board of Governors passed a resolution that criticized Iran for defying a UN Security Council ban on uranium enrichment, censured Iran for secretly building a uranium enrichment facility and demanded that it immediately suspend further construction. It noted the IAEA chief Mohammed El-Baradei cannot confirm that Iran's nuclear program is exclusively geared toward peaceful uses, and expressed "serious concern" that Iran's stonewalling of an IAEA probe means "the possibility of military dimensions to Iran's nuclear program" cannot be excluded.

== Cooperation with Venezuela ==
In October 2009 Hugo Chávez announced that Iran was helping Venezuela in uranium exploration. He said that "We're working with several countries, with Iran, with Russia. We're responsible for what we're doing, we're in control". A number of reports suggested that Venezuela was helping Iran to obtain uranium and evade international sanctions.

== Enrichment ==
On 9 February 2010 the Iranian government announced that it would produce uranium enriched to up to 20 percent to produce fuel for a research reactor used to produce medical radioisotopes, processing its existing stocks of 3.5 percent enriched uranium. Two days later during the celebrations in Tehran for the 31st anniversary of the 1979 revolution, President Mahmoud Ahmadinejad announced that Iran was now a "nuclear state." IAEA officials confirmed it has enriched uranium "up to 19.8%".

Responding to criticism, Ahmadinejad said, "Why do they think that 20 per cent is such a big deal? Right now in Natanz we have the capability to enrich at over 20 per cent and at over 80 per cent, but because we don't need it, we won't do it." He added "If we wanted to manufacture a bomb, we would announce it."

On the same day as Ahmadinejad's announcement, Ali Akbar Salehi, head of the Atomic Energy Organization of Iran, told Reuters that their 20 percent enrichment production, was going "very well," adding "There is no limit on enrichment. We can enrich up to 100% ... But we never had the intention and we do not have the intention to do so, unless we need (to)." He maintained that the 20 percent production was for a Tehran medical reactor, and as such would be limited to around 1.5 kg per month.

Iran has reportedly breached its nuclear pact with world powers by surging its enriched uranium stock and further refining its purity beyond allowed standards, the UN atomic agency, International Atomic Energy Agency (IAEA) said.

Diplomats closely monitoring the work of International Atomic Energy Agency's (IAEA) in Iran have said that investigators found traces of uranium at a secret atomic facility based in Tehran.

== Tehran Nuclear Declaration ==
US President Obama reportedly sent a letter dated 20 April 2010 to President Lula of Brazil, in which he outlined a proposed fuel swap. While expressing skepticism that the Iranians would now be willing to accept such a deal, having provided "no credible explanation" for the previous deal's rejection, President Obama wrote "For us, Iran’s agreement to transfer 1,200 kg of Iran’s low enriched uranium (LEU) out of the country would build confidence and reduce regional tensions by substantially reducing Iran’s LEU stockpile."

Turkish Prime Minister Recep Tayyip Erdogan received a similar letter. A senior US official told The Washington Post that the letter was a response to Iran's desire to ship out its uranium piecemeal, rather than in a single batch, and that during "multiple conversations" US officials made clear that Iran should also cease 20 percent enrichment; however, the official stated "there was no president-to-president letter laying out those broader concerns".

On 17 May 2010 Iran, Brazil, and Turkey issued a joint declaration "in which Iran agreed to send low-enriched uranium to Turkey in return for enriched fuel for a research reactor." The proposal was welcomed by Arab leaders and China. France's Prime Minister called the agreement a "positive step" toward resolving the Iran nuclear program dispute, if Iran were to cease uranium enrichment altogether. EU foreign policy chief Catherine Ashton played down the agreement, saying it was a step in the right direction but did not go far enough and left questions unanswered. US Secretary of State Hillary Clinton said the proposal had "a number of deficiencies," including Iran's intention to continue enriching uranium to high levels.

Meanwhile, the United States was pursuing other action to address the situation in Iran, in the case that the more diplomatic method not produce a satisfactory deal, and on 18 May 2010, announced a "draft accord" among UN permanent Security Council members for additional sanctions on Iran, designed to pressure it to end its nuclear enrichment program. Turkey and Brazil criticized the sanctions proposal. Davutoglu said that the swap agreement showed Iran's "clear political will" toward engagement on the nuclear issue. Brazil's Foreign Minister also expressed frustration with the US stance, saying of Brazil's vote against the sanctions resolution: "We could not have voted in any different way except against."

Early analysis from the BBC stated the swap deal could have been an "effort by President Mahmoud Ahmadinejad to deflect pressure for fresh sanctions" and that "Iran watchers are already criticising Washington for moving the goal posts".

Mohamed ElBaradei, former director general of the International Atomic Energy Agency, wrote that "the only way to resolve the Iranian issue is to build trust. Moving 1200, half, or at least more than half of the Iranian nuclear material out of Iran is a confidence-building measure would defuse the crisis and enable the US and the West [to gain] the space to negotiate. I hope that it would be perceived as a win-win situation. If we see what I have been observing in the last couple of days that it is an "empty dressing", I think it is a wrong approach...we lost six years of failed policy frankly vis-à-vis Iran. And it's about time now to understand that the Iranian issue is not going to be resolved except, until and unless we sit with the Iranians and try to find a fair and equitable solution." "If this deal is followed up with a broader engagement of the IAEA and the international community, it can be a positive step to a negotiated settlement," UN secretary-general Ban Ki-moon said.

== Possible espionage and assassinations ==
Several Iranian nuclear scientists died in alleged assassination attacks between 2010 and 2012.

According to former Iranian chief of staff Hassan Firouzabadi, the West used tourists and environmentalists to spy on Iran: "In their possessions were a variety of reptile desert species like lizards, chameleons… We found out that their skin attracts atomic waves and that they were nuclear spies who wanted to find out where inside the Islamic Republic of Iran we have uranium mines and where we are engaged in atomic activities.", however these plots were foiled by Iran.
