= Muhammad Sahimi =

American chemical engineer (born 1954)

Muhammad Sahimi (Persian: محمد سهیمی; born 22 January 1954) is a professor of chemical engineering and materials science and holds the NIOC (National Iranian Oil Company) chair in petroleum engineering at the University of Southern California (USC) in Los Angeles. He is also active in journalism, frequently writing on Iranian politics.

== Career ==
Sahimi received his B.S. in chemical engineering from the University of Tehran in 1977. After briefly working for the National Iranian Oil Company (NIOC), he received a scholarship from the Atomic Energy Organization of Iran. He traveled to the US in 1978 (where he has since remained), completing his Ph.D. at the University of Minnesota in 1984. He then moved to the University of Southern California, becoming chairman of his department from 1999 to 2005. Since then, he has held the NIOC Chair. He has also been a visiting professor in Australia and a consultant to many industrial corporations.

He was named a Fellow of the American Physical Society in 2023, "for fundamental contributions to the development of percolation theory and statistical physics, specifically in the characterization of heterogeneous porous materials and media, as well as the study of flow and transport processes occurring therein".

== Political views ==
Sahimi writes in broad support of Iranian reformists, one of the two main political camps inside the Islamic Republic regime; the other one is Iranian Conservatives. Since 2003, Sahimi has written many articles on the subject of Iranian politics (particularly the Iranian nuclear programme) for websites such as Payvand, Antiwar.com and the Huffington Post. He has been a regular columnist for Tehran Bureau since 2008, and has written occasional pieces for the Los Angeles Times, the New York Times, the Wall Street Journal the Harvard International Review and The Progressive.

He has, on many occasions, defended Iran's nuclear program as being peaceful, and the actions of Iran as being essentially legal and justifiable (originally in a seven-part series at Payvand entitled Iran's Nuclear Program). In the process, he has frequently leveled criticism against other writers on the subject, accusing Con Coughlin (of the UK Daily Telegraph) of knowingly spreading lies and disinformation, and David Albright of exceptional bias. (Albright responded to the criticism in a program on antiwar.com radio). He has also criticized two former Deputy Directors-General of the IAEA, Olli Heinonen and Pierre Goldschmidt, citing unnamed sources to accuse Heinonen of breaking the IAEA protocols by leaking confidential information (to David Albright) and of spreading unconfirmed claims about the contents of a laptop that was supposedly stolen from Iran and given to Western intelligence agencies, as part of a "crusade against Iran." He also accused Goldschmidt of having a "personal agenda" about Iran's nuclear program, while also disputing his assessment that Iran has violated the NPT.

In his writings on Iran's nuclear program, Sahimi has also expressed the view that the United Nations Security Council sanction resolutions against Iran are illegal. Because of his strong support for the Islamic Republic of Iran's nuclear program and the similarity of his arguments to those used by the Iranian government in its IAEA submissions, he has been accused of being close to the government in Tehran. Sahimi has denied these accusations but has stated that his articles have been used without his knowledge by members of the Iranian political establishment, including Ayatollah Rafsanjani.

== Books ==
1. Applications of Percolation Theory (1994)
2. Flow and Transport in Porous Media and Fractured Rock (1995); second edition (2011).
3. Heterogeneous Materials I, Linear Transport, and Optical Properties (2003)
4. Heterogeneous Materials II, Nonlinear and Breakdown Properties and Atomistic Modeling (2003)
