= Tehran Bureau =

Online news magazine

Programming
- Language: English

Ownership
- Owner: Kelly Golnoush Niknejad

History
- Launched: February 2008

Links
- Website: tehranbureau.com

Tehran Bureau is an online news magazine covering politics, foreign affairs, culture and society in Iran and the Iranian Diaspora. It was founded by Iranian-born journalist Kelly Golnoush Niknejad in February 2008, initially as a blog. In May 2009, it was launched as a virtual news bureau, featuring a growing list of regular contributors and journalists knowledgeable about Iran and Iranian affairs. Tehran Bureau combines aspects of traditional journalism and new media, using trusted online social networks to complement conventional coverage. Starting out as an independent news organization, Tehran Bureau had no affiliation with and received no funding or support from any government, religious, or interest group. However, in September 2009 it began a collaboration with the Public Broadcasting Service television series "Frontline" which will provide it with financing, host its Web site and provide editorial support. In return Tehran Bureau will help shape a coming "Frontline" program about Iran.

The British news website The Guardian hosted Tehran Bureau for a while. In an article revealing the new arrangement, The Guardian assured that the magazine would "retain its independence under Niknejad"

Its mission statement states, "Tehran Bureau is a virtual bureau connecting journalists, Iran experts and readers all over the world. Our stories are written by Iranians in Iran and the Middle East, foreigners viewing or interacting with our culture for the first time, and hyphenated Iranians best suited to bridge the cultures."

Among its contributing journalists Muhammad Sahimi, Jason Rezaian, Gareth Smyth and many others writing without a byline since the crackdown on journalists after the June 12 presidential election of 2009.
