= IR-40 =

Heavy water reactor in Arak, Iran

Coordinates: 34.37341°N 49.24078°E

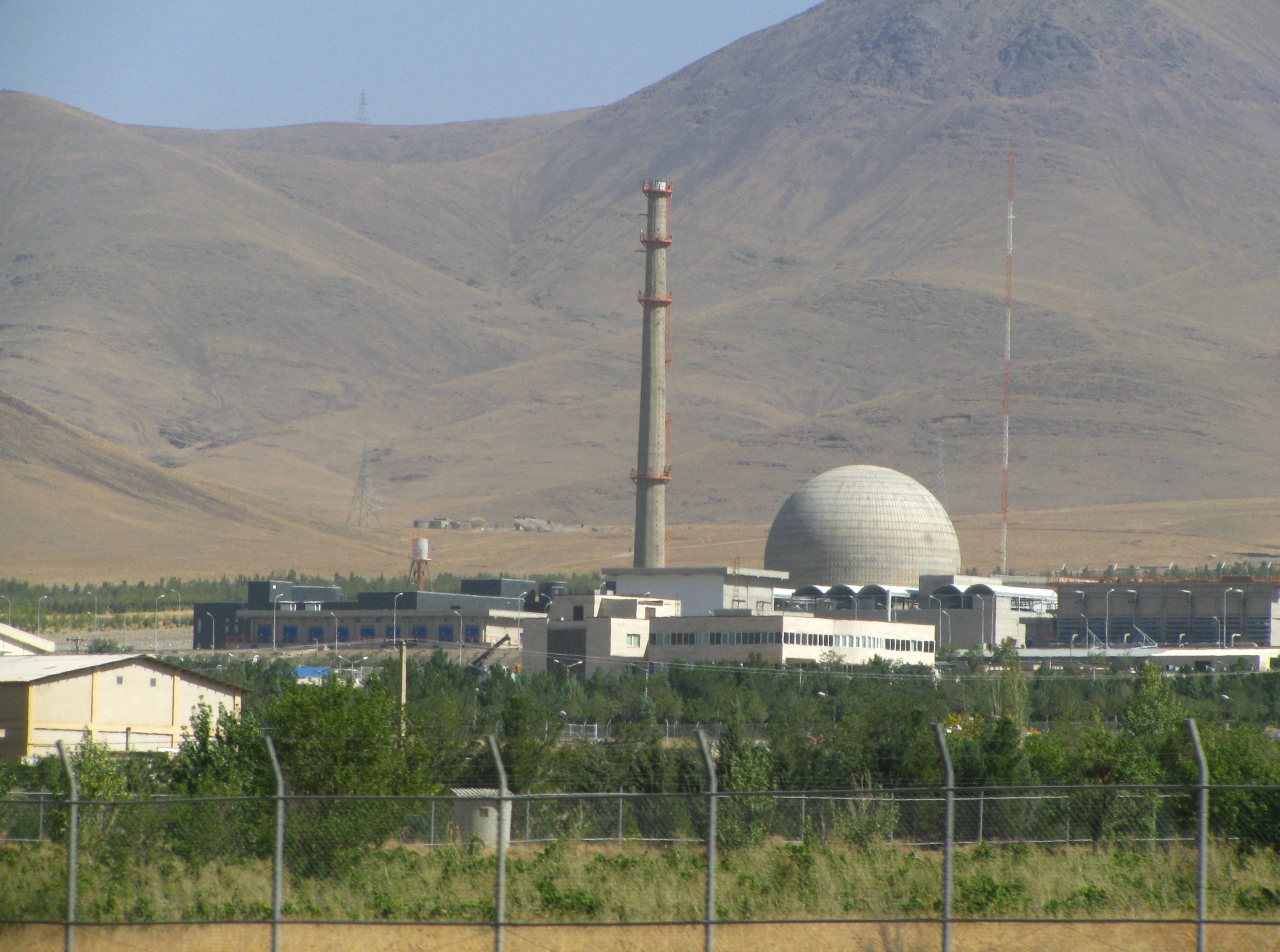
The IR-40 (Arak) reactor, 2012

IR-40 (officially the Khondab Heavy Water Research Reactor), part of the Arak Nuclear Complex, was an Iranian 40 megawatt (thermal) heavy water reactor near Arak, adjacent to the 1990s era Arak Heavy Water Production Plant. The plant was made unusable in 2015 by removing the core and filling it with concrete, and it was hit by Israel in 2025 to keep it from being restored. The facility would later again be struck by Israel in March 2026. Civil works for the project began in October 2004. It was initially planned that the reactor would begin nuclear operations in 2014.

== History ==
In the mid-1980s, Iran's leadership decided to construct a natural uranium (i.e. not requiring enrichment to produce fuel) nuclear power plant, using heavy water as moderator and coolant. The reactor design was 90% complete in 2002. By then the existing Tehran Research Reactor, after 35 years operation, was reaching its design safety limits, and had been enveloped by the suburbs of Tehran.

The reactor was originally going to be constructed at a location in Esfahan. In 2002, it was decided to build at the current location near Arak. Civil works for the construction began in October 2004.

In August 2006, mixed reports came out about when the reactor would go into operation, one stating that the plant would start up in 2009, while another reported that operation would be postponed until 2011. Reportedly, the Russian firm Nikiet assisted with portions of the design but stopped in the late 1990s following U.S. pressure.

Press reports indicate that Iranian President Mahmoud Ahmadinejad visited the reactor in June 2013, on the occasion of the reactor vessel installation, which is the final precursor prior to commencement of operation.

In July 2015, under the Joint Comprehensive Plan of Action, Iran agreed to redesign the IR-40 reactor, with assistance from the P5+1, to minimize its plutonium production and avoid production of weapons-grade plutonium. Iran also agreed to remove the reactor core or calandria and fill it with concrete to render it unusable, and to export all spent fuel within one year of its removal from the reactor.

In January 2016, Iran stated that the core of the reactor had been removed, and that it would be filled up with concrete. In January 2019, in a Channel 4 TV (Iran) interview, Ali Akbar Salehi, the head of the Atomic Energy Organization of Iran, claimed that Iran had purchased spares to replace the core, and the pictures of the pouring of concrete into the reactor’s pit were photoshopped.

In 2017, the reactor was renamed as the 'Khondab Heavy Water Research Reactor'.

=== Israeli air strikes ===
On 19 June 2025, the reactor containment building was damaged in a direct hit by Israel during the Twelve-Day War, as were distillation towers at the adjacent heavy water production plant. Israel previously told residents of the surrounding areas to evacuate, specifically from Arak and Khonddab.

On 27 March 2026, the plant was attacked in another Israeli airstrike, just hours after Israel threatened to “escalate and expand” its campaign against Tehran. Iran’s Atomic Energy Organization stated that the strikes posed no risk of contamination. The attacks came after US President Donald Trump claimed talks on ending the war were going well and gave Tehran more time to open the Strait of Hormuz. Iranian Foreign Minister Abbas Araghchi wrote that Israel had targeted Iranian infrastructure, including two of its "largest steel factories," a power plant and civilian nuclear sites: The "Attack contradicts [Donald Trump's] extended deadline for diplomacy", in reference to Trump's saying Pentagon would "postpone any and all military strikes against Iranian power plants and energy infrastructure" to facilitate peace talks.

== Role in Iran's nuclear program ==
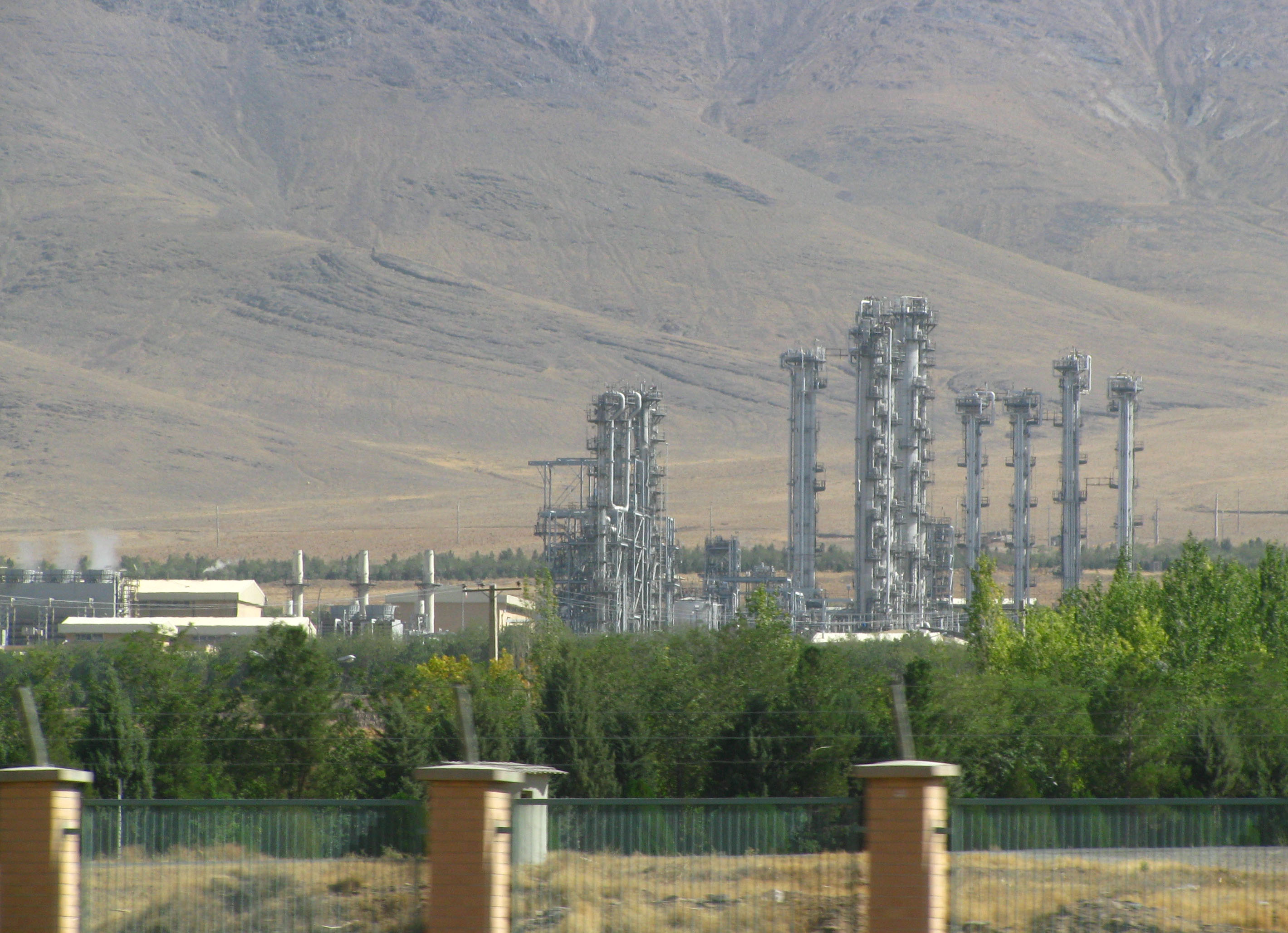
The heavy water production plant near Arak

Iran states that the reactor will only be used for research and development, medical and industrial isotope production. On June 16, 2010 Iran announced plans to fabricate fuel for the Tehran Research Reactor by September 2011 and to build a new 20 MW reactor for radioisotope production within five years.

Aspects of IR-40's design will also serve as a prototype and testbed for the larger 336 megawatt Darkhovin Nuclear Power Plant under construction near Ahvaz.

=== Proliferation concerns ===
There are some proliferation concerns about the reactor's ability to produce enough plutonium for several nuclear weapons each year. However the IAEA has reported that it found no indication of ongoing reprocessing activities, required to extract plutonium from the spent fuel. In full operation, it is expected that the reactor will produce from 10 kilograms (22 lb) to 12 kilograms (26 lb) of plutonium a year within its spent nuclear fuel.

Natural-uranium fueled heavy water reactors are well-suited for producing weapons-grade plutonium for use in nuclear weapons. Analysis suggests that Iran could extract 8–10 kilograms of high purity Pu-239 annually from fuel irradiated in IR-40. This, according to the IAEA, is sufficient weapons-grade material to produce 1-2 nuclear weapons annually. In August 2009, the IAEA was granted access to IR-40 and was able to carry out Design Information Verification, where the IAEA confirmed that the facility "at its current stage of construction conforms to the design information provided by Iran as of January 24, 2007."

As a result of concerns that this plutonium would support weapons development, former IAEA Deputy Director-General for Safeguards, Olli Heinonen, proposed a reactor redesign to a reactor using slightly enriched uranium fuel rather than natural uranium. Use of enriched uranium fuel combined with extended operations would reduce the reactor's ability to produce weapons-grade plutonium.

Iran has indicated they do not intend to reprocess IR-40 spent fuel to recover weapons-grade plutonium, nor operate under a low burnup regime that could produce weapons-grade plutonium. Originally a hot cell facility at the Arak site was planned, described as capable of handling irradiated fuel and targets (such as targets for production of medical radioisotopes) from the IR-40. In 2004, plans for hot cells at Arak were removed. However some proliferation experts have expressed concern that once sufficient fuel has been irradiated Iran may modify this facility or build a separate reprocessing facility to recover weapons-grade plutonium.

== See also ==
- Bushehr Nuclear Power Plant
- Darkhovin Nuclear Power Plant
- Fordow Fuel Enrichment Plant
- Isfahan Nuclear Technology/Research Center
- List of power stations in Iran
- Natanz Nuclear Facility
- Nuclear program of Iran
- Supreme Nuclear Committee of Iran
