= Pierre Goldschmidt =

Belgian physicist

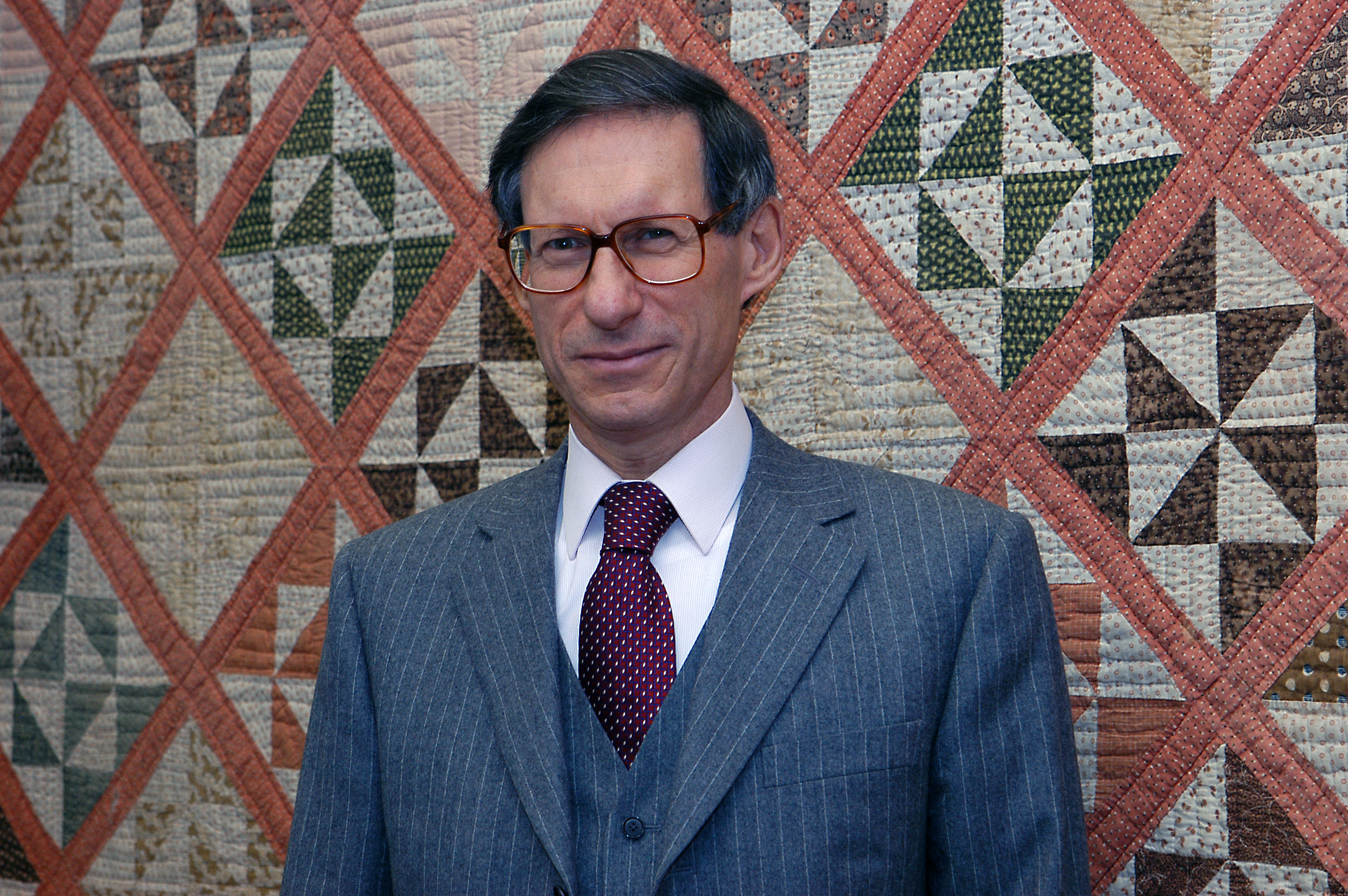
Pierre Goldschmidt (2003)

Pierre Goldschmidt, a Belgian nuclear scientist, retired June, 2005, as Deputy Director General and Head of the Department of Safeguards at the International Atomic Energy Agency, (IAEA), succeeded by Olli Heinonen. From mid-2005 to the end of 2017, Goldschmidt was a researcher of the Carnegie Endowment for International Peace.

IAEA is an inter-governmental organization under the auspices of the United Nations. Pierre Goldschmidt was appointed DDG in May, 1999. The Department of Safeguards is responsible for verifying that nuclear material placed under safeguards is not diverted to nuclear weapons or other nuclear explosive devices and that there is no undeclared nuclear material or activities in non-nuclear weapons States party to the NPT.

Before assuming the DDG position, Goldschmidt was, for 12 years, General Manager of SYNATOM, the company responsible for the fuel supply and spent fuel management of seven Belgian nuclear plants that provide about 60% of that country's electricity. For six years Goldschmidt was a member of the Directoire of EURODIF, the large French uranium enrichment company.

Goldschmidt has headed numerous European and international committees, including as Chairman of the Uranium Institute in London and Chairman of the Advisory Committee of the EURATOM Supply Agency.

Goldschmidt studied Electro-Mechanical Engineering and holds a Ph.D. in Applied Science from the University of Brussels and a master's degree in Nuclear Engineering from the University of California, Berkeley.
