= Olli Heinonen =

Finnish chemist

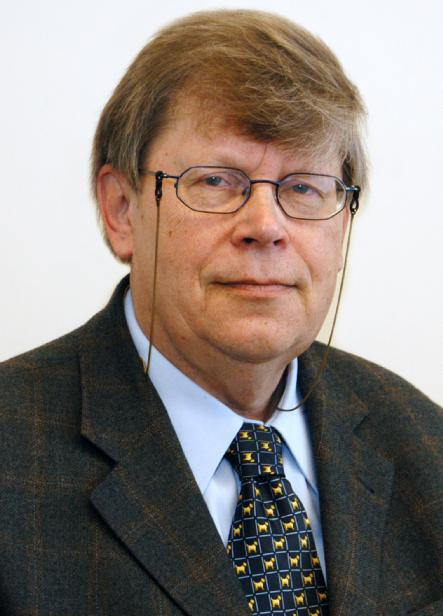
Olli Heinonen

Olli Heinonen (born in Finland) is Senior Advisor on Science and Nonproliferation at the Foundation for Defense of Democracies (FDD) and an associate of Harvard University's Belfer Center for Science and International Affairs. Previously, he was the Deputy Director-General for Safeguards at the International Atomic Energy Agency. As such, he helped identify A. Q. Khan.

Heinonen studied radiochemistry at the University of Helsinki where he obtained his Ph.D. with a dissertation on nuclear material analysis in 1981. As Senior Research Officer at the Technical Research Centre of Finland Reactor Laboratory, Heinonen was in charge of research and development related to nuclear waste solidification and disposal. Heinonen co-authored several patents on radioactive waste solidification. In 1983 he joined the IAEA. From 1999 to 2002, he was Director of Operations A and from 2002 to 2005, he was the Director of Operations B in the Department of Safeguards.
