= 2025–2026 Iran–United States negotiations =

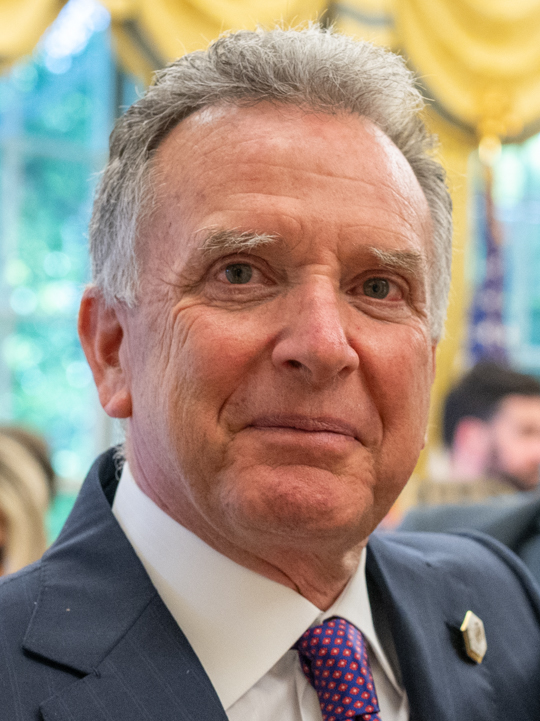
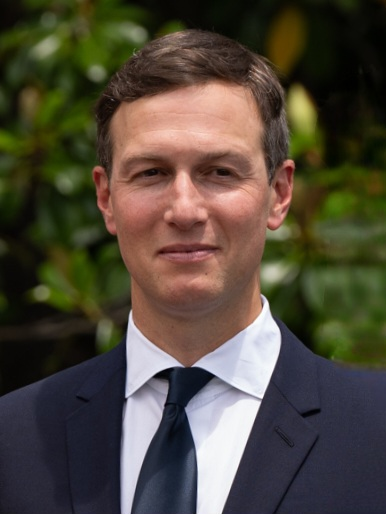
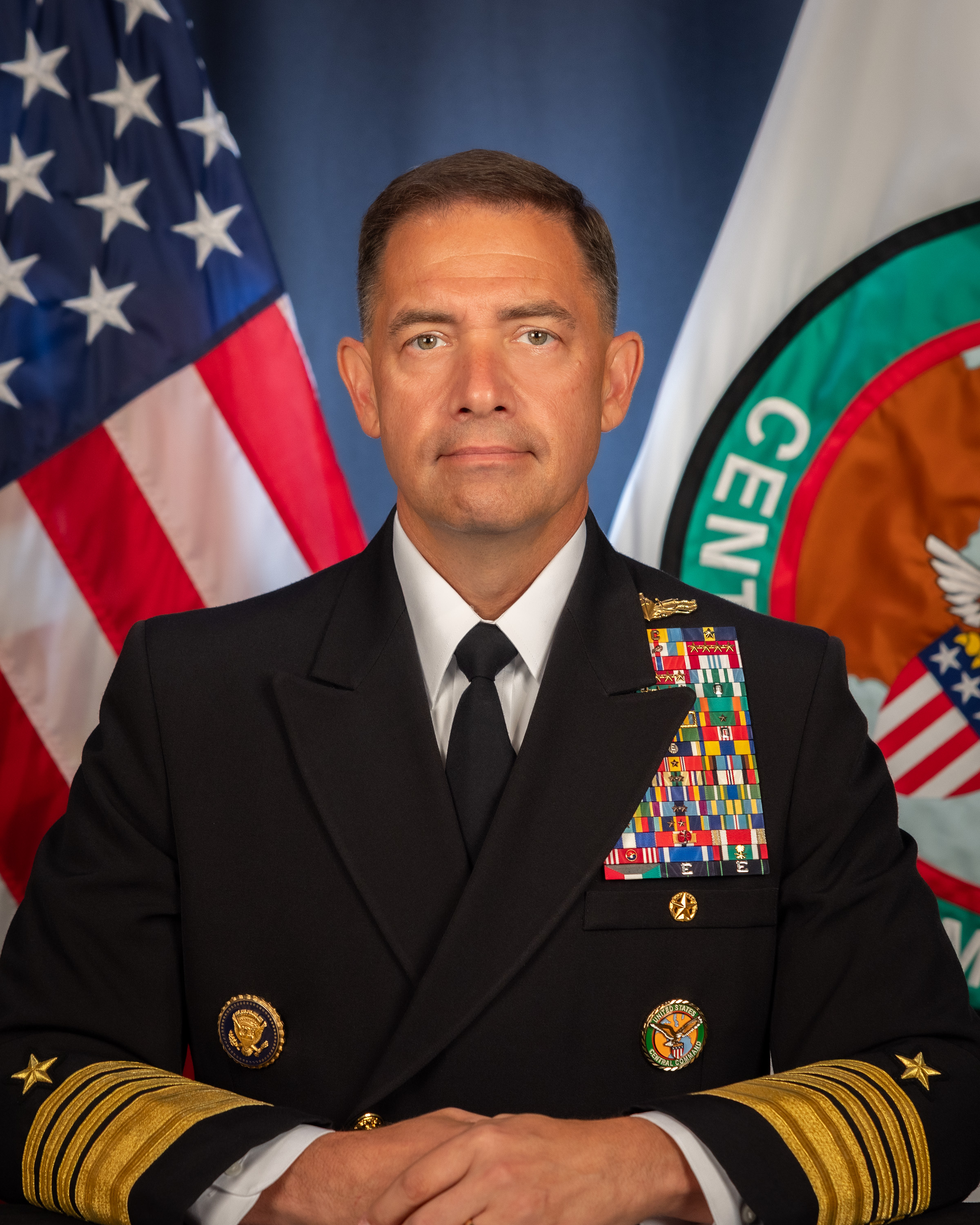
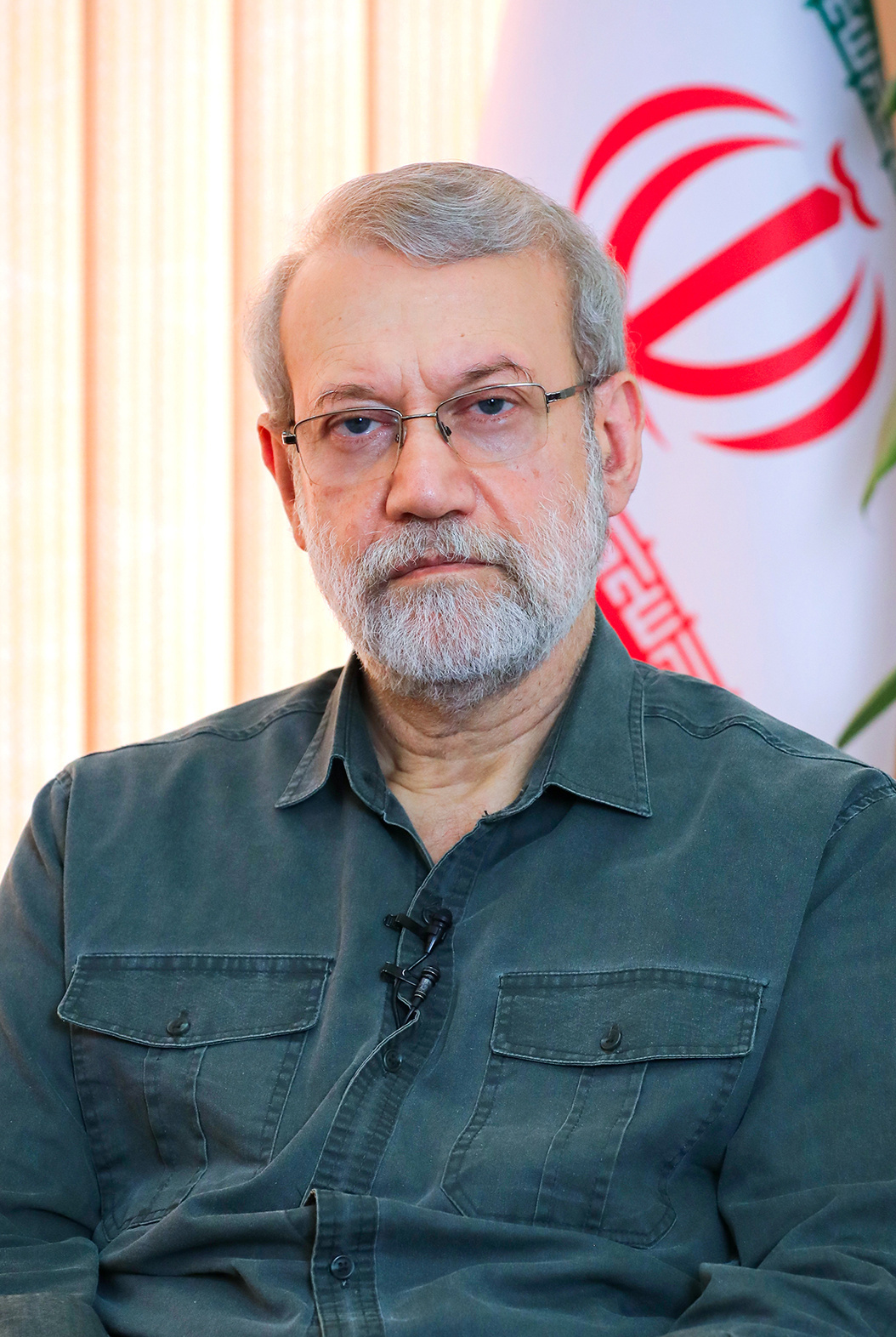
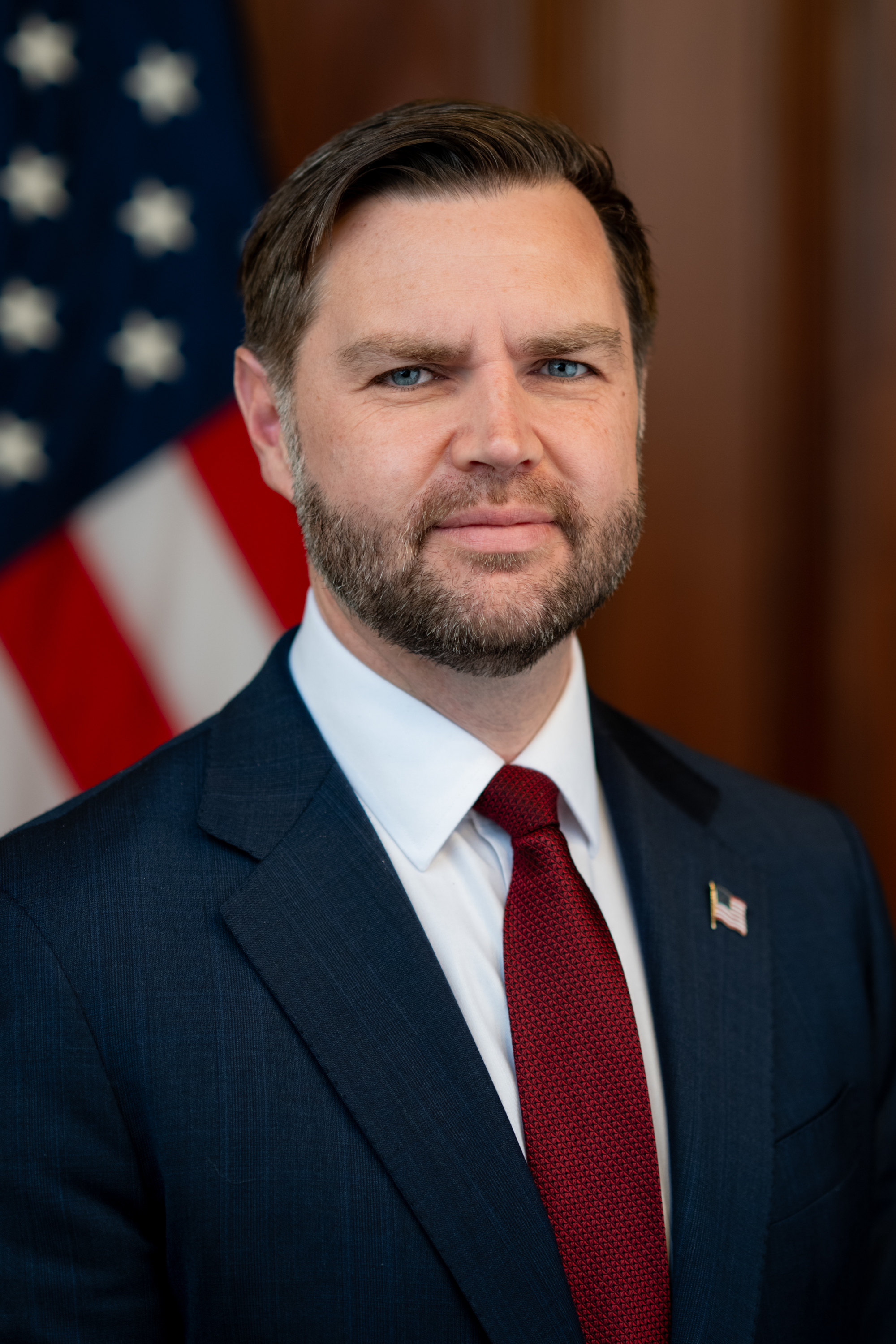
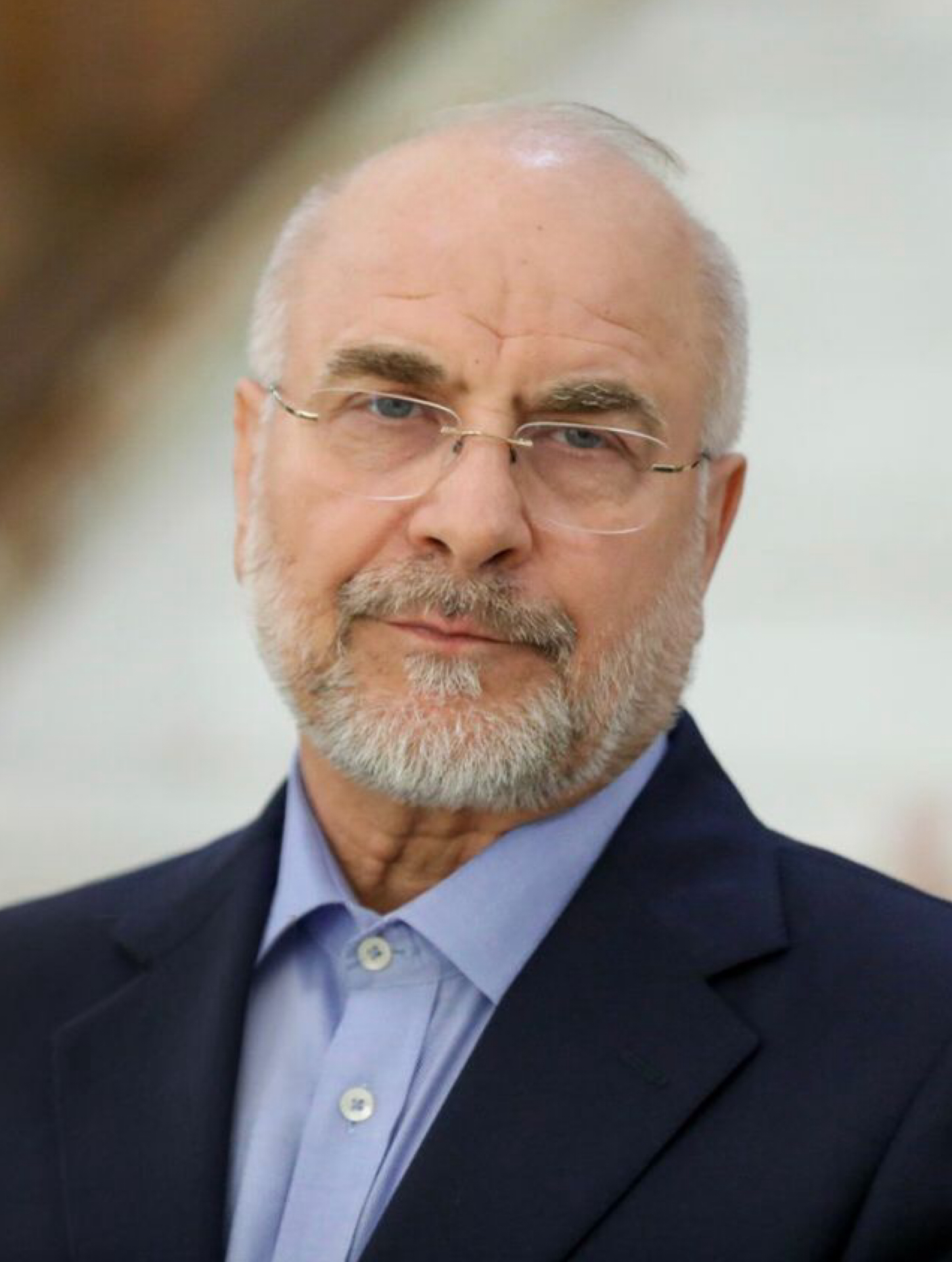
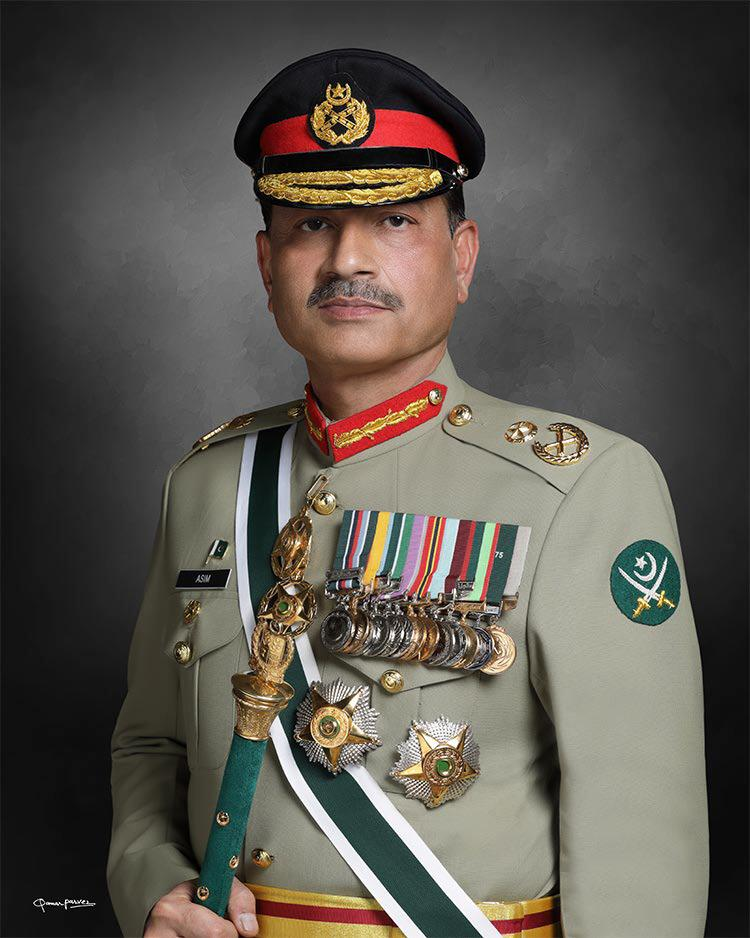
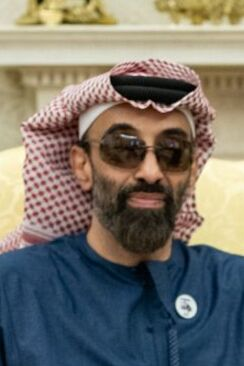
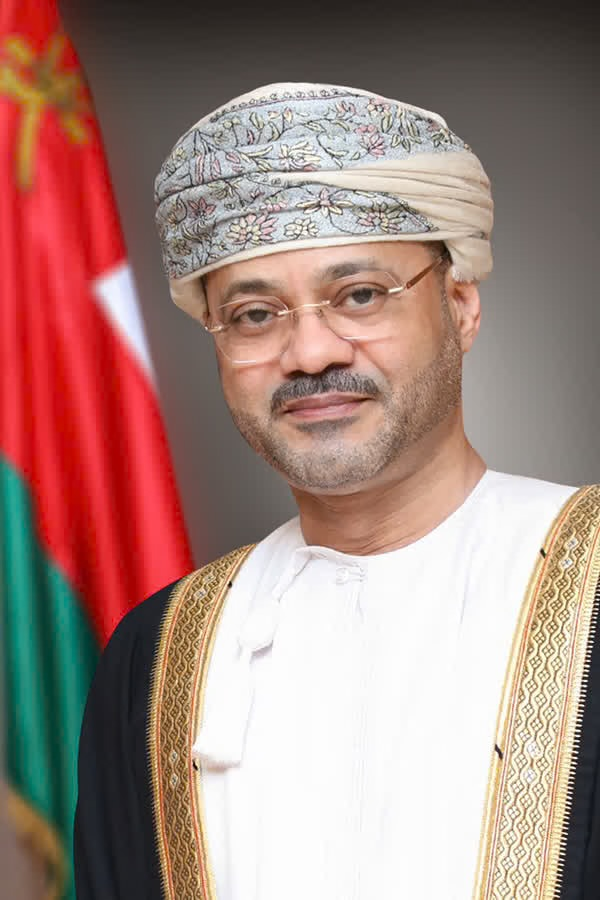
- Steve Witkoff Jared Kushner Brad Cooper Abbas Araghchi Ali Larijani X VP JD Vance Mohammad Bagher Ghalibaf Asim Munir Tahnoun bin Zayed Badr bin Hamad Al Busaidi
- Date: Round 1: April 12 – June 13, 2025 (62 days); Round 2: February 6–28, 2026 (22 days); Round 3: March 30 – April 7, 2026 (8 days); Islamabad Talks: April 11–12, 2026 (1 day); Islamabad Memorandum: June 17, 2026; First Technical Talks: June 21, 2026; Second Technical Talks: June 28, 2026
- Venues: Al Alam Palace, Muscat, Oman (April 12, 2025); Embassy of Oman, Rome, Italy (April 19, 2025); Geneva, Switzerland (February 15, 2026); Islamabad, Pakistan (Islamabad Talks on April 11 and 12, 2026); Palace of Versailles, France, Tehran, Iran and Islamabad, Pakistan (Memorandum of understanding on June 17, 2026); Bürgenstock, Switzerland (June 21 and 28, 2026)
- Participants: United States; Special Envoy Steve Witkoff; Director of Policy Planning Michael Anton; CENTCOM commander Brad Cooper; Special Envoy Jared Kushner; VP of the United States JD Vance (From April 2026); Iran; Iranian minister of foreign affairs Abbas Araghchi; Deputy Foreign Minister Majid Takht-Ravanchi; Speaker of the Parliament Mohammad Bagher Ghalibaf (From April 2026); Secretary of the Supreme National Security Council Ali Larijani X
- Follows: 2026 United States military buildup in the Middle East; 2025–2026 Iranian protests Joint Comprehensive Plan of Action (2015–2018); United States withdrawal from the JCPOA (2018); Red Sea crisis (2023–present); Iranian financial crisis (2024–present)
- Precedes: Twelve-Day War; 2026 Iran war

Key points
- Nuclear program of Iran

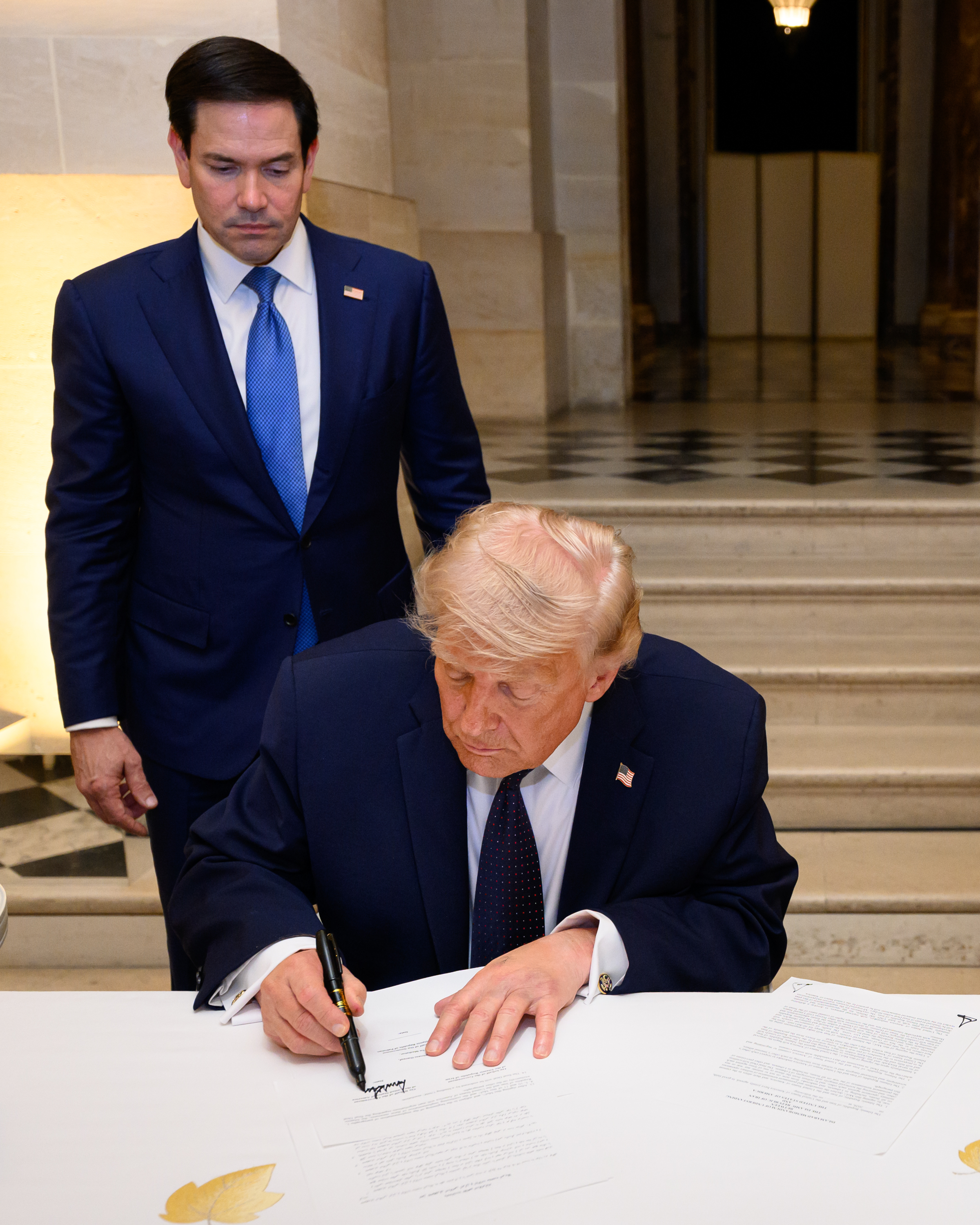
President Donald Trump at Versailles, France signing the Islamabad Memorandum

In 2025 and 2026, Iran and the United States began a series of negotiations aimed at reaching a nuclear peace agreement, following a letter from US president Donald Trump to Iranian supreme leader Ali Khamenei, setting a 60-day deadline for Iran to reach an agreement. After the deadline passed without an agreement in June 2025, Israel launched airstrikes against Iran, starting the Twelve-Day War. As of June 28, 2026, there were three rounds of talks before the Islamabad talks that led to the Islamabad Memorandum, and two rounds of technical talks.

The first round was held in Oman on April 12, 2025, led by US special envoy Steve Witkoff and Iranian foreign minister Abbas Araghchi. A second round of Omani-mediated talks took place in Rome on April 19, 2025, again between Witkoff and Araghchi. This was followed by a third round in Muscat around a week later; an expert-level meeting to develop a framework for a possible nuclear agreement was led by Michael Anton for the US and by Majid Takht-Ravanchi for Iran.

The US military had been building up its presence in the Middle East as the threat of war escalated. US bases throughout the region accommodate approximately 50,000 American troops. As part of the peace proposals, Iran proposed building at least 19 additional reactors, suggesting that American involvement in these projects could help revitalize the US nuclear industry. A planned address by Araghchi to formally announce this proposal was ultimately cancelled.

On May 27, Trump said both sides were close to finalizing an agreement involving strong inspections. Araghchi stated he was unsure whether a deal was imminent, while Khamenei's advisor, Ali Shamkhani, dismissed Trump's desired control over the Iranian nuclear program as a "fantasy". Israel reportedly threatened to preemptively attack Iranian nuclear installations, although this was denied by Benjamin Netanyahu. On May 31, the International Atomic Energy Agency (IAEA) reported that Iran had amassed a record amount of military-grade enriched uranium. On June 11, US embassies in Iraq and other Arab states began to evacuate personnel in response to Iranian threats on American bases. The Houthis threatened retaliation against the United States should an attack be launched on Iran. President Trump was reportedly provided with a range of options for an attack on Iran by CENTCOM. The UK issued a threat advisory for ships in the Persian Gulf. On June 12, the IAEA declared Iran in breach of its non-proliferation obligations.

On June 13, Israel launched large-scale attacks targeting Iran's military leadership and nuclear scientists. Consequently, Iran withdrew and suspended nuclear talks indefinitely. The United States also carried out a series of strikes on Iranian nuclear sites and negotiations between the United States and Iran were subsequently suspended. Talks resumed in early 2026 after large-scale protests in Iran. Meanwhile, the US military buildup in the Middle East continued.

On February 28, 2026, the United States and Israel launched large-scale strikes on Iran, marking the start of the 2026 Iran war. The attacks included the assassination of Khamenei, as well as the assassination of Ali Larijani, a key figure in the negotiations. On April 7, 2026, Iran and the United States announced a temporary two-week ceasefire.

On May 24, 2026, reports indicated that the United States and Iran were nearing a broader peace agreement following months of conflict and stalled negotiations. US president Donald Trump stated that a memorandum of understanding was close to finalisation and suggested that the Strait of Hormuz could soon reopen under a ceasefire framework.

On June 17, 2026, Trump and Iranian president Masoud Pezeshkian signed remotely the Islamabad Memorandum to end the war between both countries and Israel, with Trump signing it during dinner with French president Emmanuel Macron at the Palace of Versailles following the G7 summit, after which Pezeshkian signed it in Tehran.

On July 8, the ceasefire agreement between the US and Iran broke after Iran launched attacks on commercial vessels in the Strait of Hormuz to assert Iranian sovereignty over the Strait of Hormuz, startling US officials and shattering a brief diplomatic calm.

== Background ==
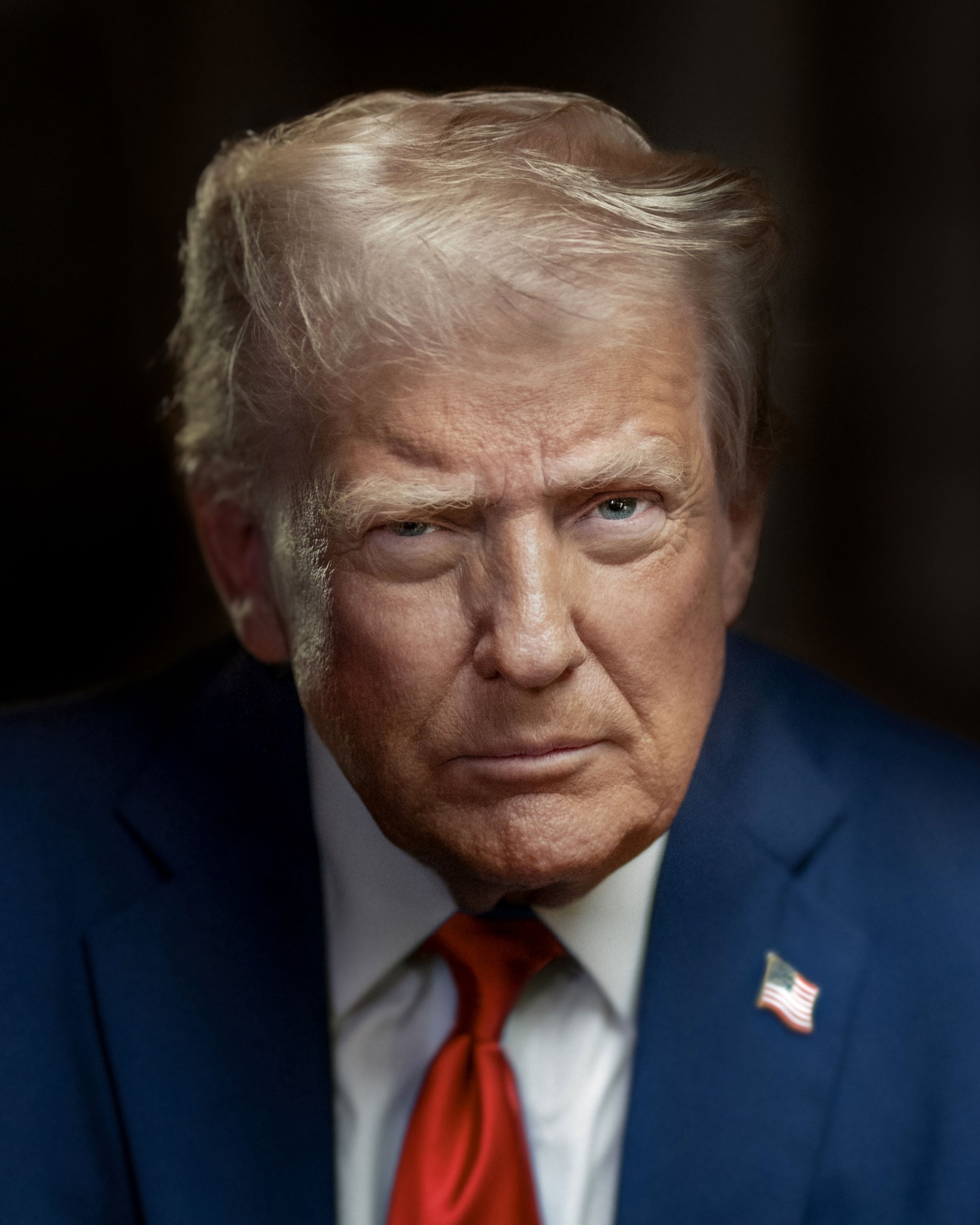
Donald Trump

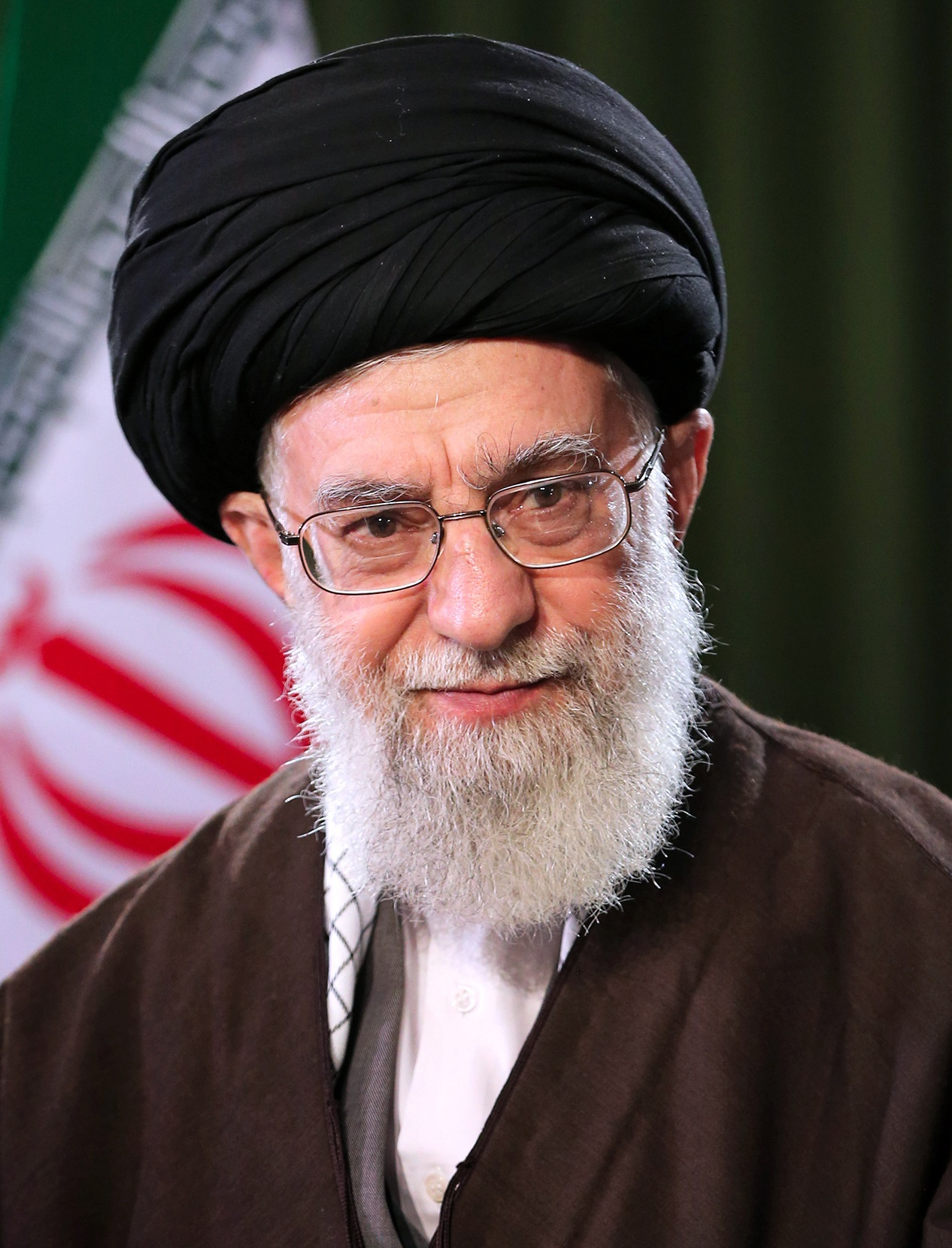
Ali Khamenei

Iran's nuclear program has been a focal point of international scrutiny for decades. Although the country suspended its formal nuclear weapons program in 2003, in December 2024, the UN nuclear watchdog IAEA reported enrichment to levels approaching weapons-grade. It also found an unprecedented stockpile of highly enriched uranium without a credible civilian purpose, giving Iran the capacity to produce enough fissile material for multiple bombs on short notice. The program has received external assistance, including from Pakistan and North Korea, with the latter supplying both missiles and uranium. In January 2025, the exiled opposition group National Council of Resistance of Iran (NCRI) alleged that Iran is developing long-range missiles under the IRGC, with ranges up to 3,000 kilometres (1,900 mi). Iran said its nuclear activities were for peaceful purposes (the creation of nuclear energy). Senior adviser Kamal Kharrazi stated that Iran has the technical capacity to build nuclear weapons but is constrained by a fatwa issued by Ali Khamenei, adding that this stance could change if the country's existence were threatened.

Analysts and researchers say that a nuclear-armed Iran poses significant global security risks and undermines the stability of the Middle East. IAEA chief Rafael Grossi warned that an Iranian nuclear weapon could trigger broad nuclear proliferation, as other countries, particularly in the Middle East, may seek similar capabilities in response. Concerns also exist that Iran's nuclear assets could fall into the hands of extremist factions due to internal instability or regime change. Additionally, Iran's success in acquiring nuclear weapons could encourage other regional powers to seek their own nuclear arsenals. The potential transfer of nuclear technology or weapons to radical states and terrorist organizations heightens fears of nuclear terrorism. Scholars argue that a nuclear-armed Iran could feel emboldened to increase its support for terrorism and insurgency—core elements of its strategy—while deterring retaliation through its newfound nuclear leverage.

Some analysts have argued that a lasting post-war settlement would require reframing Iran's nuclear concessions not as unilateral disarmament but as a compensated transaction. In one proposed framework, Iran would accept full dismantlement of its enriched uranium stockpile and nuclear infrastructure in exchange for a comprehensive economic settlement covering decades of lost investment and sanctions.

In response to Iran's nuclear program, the international community imposed sanctions that severely impacted its economy, restricting its oil exports and limiting access to global financial systems. In 2015, however, the Joint Comprehensive Plan of Action (JCPOA) was signed, imposing strict limitations on Iran's nuclear program in exchange for sanctions relief. In 2018, the United States withdrew from the agreement, with President Donald Trump stating that "the heart of the Iran deal was a giant fiction: that a murderous regime desired only a peaceful nuclear energy program". The US also contended that the agreement was inadequate because it did not impose limitations on Iran's ballistic missile program, and failed to curb its backing of proxy groups. Prior to the second Trump administration, the Biden administration held talks with Iran that were ultimately unsuccessful.

In February 2025, Trump reinstated the maximum pressure campaign to push Iran into a new nuclear deal, prevent its development of nuclear weapons, and counter its regional influence. He said he would not tolerate an "Iranian nuclear weapons capability", and did not rule out supporting military action if diplomacy failed, with his team stating that "all options are on the table" when it comes to Iran. In April 2025, Atomic Energy Organization of Iran chief Mohammad Eslami declared Iran plans to build more nuclear power plants.

== Trump's letter to Khamenei ==
On March 7, 2025, Trump announced that he had written a letter to Ali Khamenei, expressing his desire to initiate new nuclear negotiations with Iran. He warned that failure to accept the proposal could expose Iran to serious military consequences. Trump also imposed additional sanctions on the country and pledged to reduce Iran's oil exports to zero. According to Emirati political scientist Abdulkhaleq Abdullah, the letter included demands that Iran fully dismantle its nuclear program, halt all enrichment, and end support for regional proxy groups, with compliance required within two months. In exchange, the US offered to lift sanctions and normalize relations, while warning that failure to negotiate would result in military strikes.

Initially, Khamenei did not acknowledge the letter, indicating that Iran would not meet the new expectations. During March 2025, Iran and the US engaged in indirect exchanges over Trump's letter, with both sides issuing threats. Khamenei reportedly changed his mind about the negotiations after his advisors warned that the threat of war with the United States and the deepening economic crisis could bring down the government. By the end of March, the Iranian leadership had sent a reply to the letter expressing readiness for nuclear negotiations.

== Participants ==
=== 2025 ===
Participants of the high-level negotiations:

- US – Steve Witkoff, the White House special envoy leading the American side of the negotiations with Iran.
- Iran – Abbas Araghchi, the Iranian foreign minister who insisted on indirect talks and has published an op-ed in The Washington Post to appeal to Trump.

Participants of the expert-level negotiations (starting first during the third round):

- US – Michael Anton, the director of Policy Planning, as well as representatives from the Department of State and Department of Treasury.
- Iran – Majid Takht-Ravanchi, the deputy foreign minister who previously had been involved in the 2015 nuclear negotiations.

There were no European negotiators. France stated its intention to participate but was not included in the talks.

=== 2026 ===
Second Round Brad Cooper and Jared Kushner and Ali Larijani were added to talks. Qatar, Egypt, and Turkey joined the mediations effort. Abbas Araghchi contacted the Ministries of Foreign relations of UAE and Pakistan and Oman via phone as well.

=== Signatories ===
- Mohammad Bagher Ghalibaf
- Masoud Pezeshkian
- JD Vance
- Donald Trump
- Shehbaz Sharif

== 2025 negotiations and developments ==
=== 1st round ===
The first round was held on April 12, 2025, in Muscat, Oman. The talks were led by US special envoy Steve Witkoff and Iranian foreign Minister Abbas Araghchi; each delegation was in separate rooms, with messages relayed through Omani mediators. The discussions were described as constructive. Afterwards, the leaders of both negotiating teams spoke briefly in person. An Iranian news outlet reported that during the talks in Oman, Iran proposed a three-step plan to reach a deal with the United States:

1. Iran would agree to temporarily lower its uranium enrichment to 3.67% in return for access to frozen financial assets in the United States and authorization to export its oil.
2. Iran would permanently halt high-level uranium enrichment, restore inspections by the UN nuclear watchdog IAEA, and commit to implementing the Additional Protocol, allowing for surprise inspections at undeclared sites. These steps would be taken if the United States lifts further sanctions and persuades Britain, Germany, and France not to trigger the snapback of UN sanctions against Tehran.
3. The US Congress would approve the nuclear agreement and Washington would lift both primary and secondary sanctions, while Iran would transfer its stockpiles of highly enriched uranium to a third country.

Moreover, Iran had reportedly proposed steps to deescalate tensions, including a pledge to disarm and freeze the activities of Hamas, the Houthis, Hezbollah, and Hashd al-Shaabi. US envoy Witkoff reportedly welcomed the proposals presented by the Iranian delegation in Muscat, which were unexpected by the Iranian side. In early April, Iranian military advisor and security council politician Shamkhani warned that Iran would expel IAEA inspectors if threats for foreign aggression persisted. Later that month, IAEA chief Rafael Grossi visited Iran and met Araghchi. Grossi said they were "in a very crucial stage of these important negotiations" and that he worked to facilitate the process.

=== 2nd round ===
The second round of Omani-mediated talks in Rome occurred on April 19, 2025, one week after the initial meeting in Muscat, the capital of Oman in four hours. Once again, the indirect discussions were led by Araghchi and Witkoff, with messages conveyed through Omani foreign minister Badr al-Busaidi. Afterwards, US president Trump said that he was open to meeting Iran's Supreme Leader Ali Khamenei. Following the second round of talks, the Israeli Air Force reportedly conducted drills simulating an Iranian missile attack on Israeli airbases. Meanwhile, Iran was reported to be constructing a large security barrier around two underground tunnel complexes linked to its main nuclear facility. Russia promised to fund the construction of a nuclear reactor in Iran. China, Russia, and Iran held a joint meeting with the International Atomic Energy Agency (IAEA) on April 24 to discuss Iran's nuclear program.

=== 3rd round ===
The third round of high-level negotiations took place on April 26, 2025, along with the first round of expert-level talks. The high-level talks were described as serious and productive, with both sides aiming for an agreement based on mutual respect. Araghchi reported progress but noted that key differences remained. Trump's special envoy Witkoff aimed to finalize the deal within 60 days; however it was reported that mistrust between the parties could result in resistance from Iranian foreign minister Abbas Araghchi and could undermine this objective. Another critical issue was Iran's stockpile of highly enriched uranium and its potential destruction, for which the US would agree to lift economic sanctions. While Iran intended to retain its enriched uranium stockpile within its borders, the US insisted it must be transferred to a third country. Additionally, Iran sought guarantees to protect itself in the event that the US withdraws from or violates the agreement.

==== Post-third round developments ====
France warned that if no deal was reached on Iran's nuclear program, it was prepared to trigger the snapback mechanism to reinstate U.N. sanctions that were lifted under the JCPOA. Along with Britain and Germany, France could activate this process before the JCPOA expired in October, which would permanently cut Iran off from key technology, investment, and European markets, dealing a severe blow to its economy; however, Iranian foreign minister Araghchi later warned the European parties against initiating snapback sanctions, cautioning that such a move would severely harm the negotiations—a warning he repeated several times in the following weeks. Iran proposed holding further talks with European participation, while also offering investment opportunities.

On April 30, the US Treasury sanctioned 6 Chinese chemical components companies connected to Iran. On May 1, defense secretary Hegseth posted that Iran will pay for supporting Houthi attacks on merchant ships in Red Sea crisis. President Trump warned of secondary sanctions on entities buying any oil or petrochemicals from Iran. Rubio warned to walk away from nuclear enrichment. Araghchi canceled the May 4 meeting citing a "technical reason". Trump has called for the full dismantling of nuclear enrichment. Iran then unveiled a new ballistic missile and threatened to hit US military bases. Revolutionary Guard General Salami warned that IRGC would open hell gates on invaders.

The fourth round of negotiations, originally scheduled for May 3, 2025, in Rome, was postponed amid rising tensions. Iranian officials cited US sanctions, military action against the Houthis, and what they described as "contradictory behaviour and provocative statements" by Washington as contributing factors, while stating that a new date would depend on the US approach. Oman, which mediated previous rounds, referred to logistical reasons for the delay. A source familiar with the matter indicated that the United States had not confirmed its participation, and that the timing and venue for the next round remained unconfirmed. The negotiations were taking place amid daily rolling blackouts across Iran due to ongoing electricity shortages. Supporters of Iran's nuclear program argue that the country requires nuclear energy for electricity generation.

On May 7, 2025, ahead of the 2025 visit by Donald Trump to the Middle East, US officials reported that president Donald Trump had decided that United States federal agencies would refer to the Persian Gulf as the "Arabian Gulf" or the "Gulf of Arabia" and had plans to make it official during a planned visit to Saudi Arabia later in May. This plan received outrage and condemnation from Iranians and the Iranian government. The proposed change was opposed by Iranians across the political spectrum, who displayed rare unity in rejecting the possible American move. Later that day, however, Trump told reporters that he had yet to make a decision whether to use "Arabian Gulf", stating, "I don't want to hurt anybody's feelings", appearing to acknowledge Iran's fierce opposition to that name. He said he would decide while on his visit, yet no announcement was made. JD Vance said that the deal would allow Iran to rejoin the global economy.

Republican Senators Lindsey Graham and Tom Cotton warned the next day that any future US–Iran nuclear agreement would require Senate approval to be durable, and that such approval would only be possible if Iran fully dismantled its enrichment capabilities and addressed its missile and terrorism activities. A group of Senate Republicans called for the inclusion of a 123 Agreement, which would impose strict safeguards and require full dismantlement before any cooperation. While such agreements regulate peaceful nuclear cooperation, experts noted that applying one to Iran would be highly unusual due to its history of proliferation violations and ongoing IAEA investigations. According to a well-informed source, a 123 Agreement was included in the current talks with Iran.

Fox News released a video titled "Satellite images show alleged Iranian nuclear weapons facility" on May 9. The video allegedly revealed a previously unknown Iranian nuclear weapons site, a 2,500-acre facility referred to as the "Rainbow Site", in the Semnan province. According to Fox News, it has operated for over a decade under the cover of the chemical company "Diba Energy Siba", and is involved in tritium extraction, a process with almost no civilian or commercial uses, but known to enhance nuclear weapons. Araghchi rejected the report, calling it Israeli-driven propaganda aimed at disrupting the negotiations with the US He accused the National Council of Resistance of Iran of spreading this "fabricated report".

The next day, Witkoff stated that Iran's uranium enrichment facilities must be dismantled for Washington to believe its claim of not seeking nuclear weapons. He added that Iran must permanently end its enrichment program, stressing that this requires dismantling its facilities at Natanz, Fordow, and Isfahan, and ensuring there is no weaponization. He emphasized that if the next round of talks with Iran failed to yield results, they would end and the US would pursue alternative options. During his speech on May 10, Khamenei supported chants of "death to America".

=== 4th round ===
The fourth round of talks were held on May 11 in Oman prior to Trump's visit to the Middle East. The talks were high-level only, focusing on a broader framework, with technical negotiators not participating. The talks lasted for more than three hours, with both sides calling the discussions difficult but constructive and agreeing to continue. According to unnamed Iranian officials, Iran proposed a joint nuclear-enrichment project with regional Arab states and US investment as an alternative to dismantling its nuclear program. US envoy Steve Witkoff denied this was being discussed. The plan's feasibility remained uncertain given regional tensions and the lack of diplomatic ties between Iran and the US for 45 years.

On May 12, the US imposed new sanctions targeting Iranian nuclear research with possible military applications, followed days later by sanctions on individuals and entities in China and Iran over support for Iran's ballistic missile program. On May 14, 52 senators and 177 congressmen wrote a letter to Trump to reject any deal that would allow Iran to continue uranium enrichment, stating that no agreement should leave open a path to nuclear weapons. On May 14, Iran ratified the UN Convention against Transnational Organized Crime as part of its efforts to meet the FATF Action Plan requirements for improving its anti-money laundering and counter-terrorism financing system.

==== Trump's May 2025 proposal and Iranian response ====
During Donald Trump's trip to the Middle East in mid-May, he mentioned Iran on several occasions. In Saudi Arabia, he called Iran the most destructive force in the Middle East and stated that Iran's leaders had focused on stealing their people's wealth to fund terror and bloodshed, tearing the region down. During that same visit though, he offered an olive branch to Iran, expressing his strongest willingness so far to engage in negotiations. The move was seen as a shift in US foreign policy, emphasizing that the US does not see any nation as a permanent enemy. During his next stop, Trump appealed to Qatar's emir to use his influence to help persuade Iran to reach a deal with the US over its nuclear program, calling the situation perilous and stressing the need for a solution.

Khamenei advisor Shamkhani responded to Trump's offer and said that the Iranian government was ready to sign the nuclear deal in exchange for the quick removal of all financial sanctions, whilst at the same time criticizing Trump's rhetoric and ongoing threats, saying: "He speaks of an olive branch, but we see only barbed wire." Trump confirmed that the US was very close to reaching a nuclear deal with Iran and that he preferred a peaceful solution over military action; however, Iranian officials denied having received a new US proposal and insisted they would not give up their right to enrich uranium. Although both countries expressed a preference for diplomacy, sharp disagreements persisted and continued to block progress toward an agreement, increasing the risk of a military confrontation.

On May 16, Trump sent Iran a nuclear proposal and warned that swift progress was necessary to avoid serious consequences. The Trump administration has increasingly demanded that Iran abandon uranium enrichment, making this a central issue. Khamenei rejected the proposal, dismissing this US demand as "excessive and outrageous". He accused Trump of lying about seeking peace and declared him unworthy of a response. Khamenei also reiterated that Israel is "cancerous tumour" that must be uprooted. On the same day, Trump urged Iran to "move quickly" toward a deal, Iran held talks with European powers in Istanbul about its nuclear negotiations with the US, with Iranian foreign minister Araghchi cautioning that reinstating UN sanctions, which had been lifted under the 2015 nuclear agreement that expired in October, could lead to "irreversible" consequences. On May 20, CNN reported Israel was preparing to strike Iranian nuclear facilities, an action that would mark a clear break with Trump's efforts. Iran warned that any Israeli attack would be met with a "devastating and decisive response." The day after, the US imposed new measures targeting Iran's construction sector, linked to the IRGC, and restricted 10 materials tied to its nuclear and military programs.

=== 5th round ===
The fifth round of talks, held on May 23 in Rome, ended without a breakthrough, though both sides agreed to continue discussions. US officials described the talks as constructive but emphasized that significant differences remained, particularly over the demand from the US that Iran dismantle its uranium enrichment program. Iran maintained that while it was open to limiting enrichment levels, giving up enrichment entirely was unacceptable and would collapse the negotiations. After these mixed signals, Trump was optimistic and said that progress had been made.

In the weeks leading up to the fifth round, tensions between Trump and Israeli prime minister Netanyahu had increased over the US decision to engage in nuclear talks with Iran, which Israel viewed as a serious threat to its security and regional interests. Israel strongly opposed the negotiations, lobbying against diplomatic efforts and threatening unilateral military action, including potential strikes on Iranian nuclear facilities, a position critics warned could endanger diplomacy and heighten regional tensions. Iran had reportedly strengthened its air defense systems and increased military investments in preparation for a possible US or Israeli attack if negotiations failed. Iran also ordered a large amount of Chinese solid-fuel components for ballistic missiles. Iranian foreign minister Araghchi warned that any war against Iran would cause widespread destruction across the Middle East, and that the entire region would suffer if conflict erupted.

On May 26, Austria's domestic intelligence service reported that Iran was pursuing an advanced nuclear weapons program with ballistic missiles capable of carrying nuclear warheads over long distances. Iran rejected the intelligence report as "false and baseless", calling it an attempt to create "media hype" against Iran and lacking any credibility. Iran also denied having agreed to a three-year pause of its enrichment program. On June 2, Reuters reported that Iran was preparing to decline the US proposal. After speculation that Iran might be allowed limited uranium enrichment under a possible deal, Senator Schumer demanded that Witkoff testify before Congress to clarify whether any such side agreement existed. The administration publicly maintained that Iran would not be permitted to enrich uranium. Trump also declared firmly that the deal would prohibit it. Khamenei responded that uranium enrichment is central to Iran's nuclear program and he rejected US demands to halt it. Although the American government had suspended new sanctions on Iran on June 2, just four days later it imposed secondary sanctions on 10 individuals and 27 financial investment companies and trading firms.

==== Iran's rejection of the US proposal ====
On June 9, Iran rejected the Trump administration's proposal for a new nuclear deal but announced plans to present a counteroffer through Omani mediators. Iranian Foreign Ministry spokesperson Esmaeil Baghaei called the US proposal unacceptable and not aligned with the ongoing negotiations. The main points of disagreement included Iran's right to continue domestic uranium enrichment, the handling of its stockpiles of highly enriched uranium, and the conditions for lifting sanctions against Iran. While Trump demanded the full dismantlement of Iran's enrichment program, Iranian leaders insisted that enrichment was non-negotiable. The latest US offer reportedly included assistance in building nuclear power reactors and allowed limited enrichment until a regional consortium facility becomes operational. A central demand from Iran was that sanctions relief must bring tangible economic benefits. Baghaei emphasized that this includes guarantees of restored banking and trade ties with other countries before any sanctions are lifted. He also urged the international community to address Israel's undeclared nuclear arsenal and prevent it from derailing negotiations.

On June 10, Trump stated in a Fox News interview that Iran was becoming "much more aggressive" in the negotiations. The following day, Iranian defense minister Aziz Nasirzadeh warned that if negotiations with the US collapse and conflict erupts, Iran will target American bases in the region. He stated that all US bases in nearby countries are within reach. Trump also repeatedly threatened Iran with military action if no deal was reached. US defense secretary Hegseth announced that the US military was getting ready in case the talks fail. On June 12, IAEA found Iran non-compliant with its nuclear obligations for the first time in 20 years. The IAEA stated that Iran's repeated failure to fully address questions about undeclared nuclear material and activities amounted to non-compliance. It also raised concerns over Iran's enriched uranium stockpile, which could be used for both reactor fuel and nuclear weapons. Iran dismissed the resolution as politically motivated, and declared plans to build a new enrichment site and install advanced centrifuges.

== Twelve-Day War ==
=== 2025 Israeli strikes ===
Beginning on June 13, 2025, Israel struck multiple targets across Iran with the stated goal of preventing Iran from developing nuclear weapons. The attacks damaged key nuclear facilities and killed several of Iran's top military leaders. Among those injured was Khamenei's political advisor Ali Shamkhani, who oversaw negotiations between the United States and Iran. Following the attack, the sixth round of US-Iran talks, scheduled in Oman on June 15, were indefinitely suspended. In an initial response to the strikes, Trump stated that the US "of course" supported Israel, adding that the 60-day deadline for the negotiations had just expired.

On June 17, the White House explored a meeting between envoy Witkoff and Iran's foreign minister Abbas Araghchi to revive negotiations and prevent further conflict. Trump used the threat of US military capabilities, including bunker-buster bombs, as leverage. He escalated demands for Iran's unconditional surrender while warning of additional military action. Iran responded by making counter-threats. Trump alternated between urging diplomacy and signaling support to continue the pressure.

=== 2025 US strikes ===
On June 21, following orders from Trump, the US bombed the Fordow uranium enrichment facility, the Natanz Nuclear Facility, and the Isfahan Nuclear Technology/Research Center in Iran. On June 24, Trump declared a ceasefire. Senior American officials emphasized that they did not want the conflict with Iran to escalate.

Afterwards, US envoy Witkoff stated that the US and Iran were engaging in both direct and mediated discussions aimed at returning to negotiations for a comprehensive peace agreement. He also emphasized that the American position required Iran to halt all uranium enrichment—a stance the White House had not consistently maintained during earlier rounds of negotiations. Trump said later that he had recently considered limited sanctions relief to aid Iran's recovery, but tied any step to a more conciliatory tone from Iran and he ended with an appeal for peace.

In mid-August, Iran's foreign minister Araghchi said that the conditions were not yet in place for "effective" nuclear talks with the United States, while stressing that Tehran would not cease cooperation with the UN nuclear watchdog IAEA. Iran also passed new legislation so that any further inspections by the IAEA would have to be approved by the Supreme National Security Council.

== 2026 negotiations ==
On October 13, 2025, Trump stated that the United States was ready to reach an agreement with Iran. He expressed optimism that an agreement could be achieved. In response, Iranian foreign minister Araghchi said Tehran would consider any proposal from the United States that was "fair and balanced", although he noted that no concrete framework for talks had yet been presented and that messages between the two sides were exchanged through intermediaries. Despite the conciliatory language from Trump, his administration maintained a firm stance towards Iran, and observers noted that significant barriers still stood in the way of improved relations between the two nations. During earlier nuclear negotiations, the Trump administration pressed Iran to completely dismantle its nuclear and missile programs, a demand that Iran refused. Ahead of the talks, Iran increased regional diplomacy, with Ali Larijani visiting Moscow, Abbas Araqchi holding consultations in Istanbul, and Qatar's prime minister Mohammed bin Abdulrahman bin Jassim Al Thani traveling to Tehran. Turkey, Egypt, and Qatar worked to arrange the US–Iran talks, with Iran requesting Oman as a neutral venue.

=== 1st round ===
On February 6, 2026, the United States and Iran held indirect talks in Muscat, Oman, mediated by Oman's foreign minister Badr bin Hamad Al Busaidi. American officials cast doubt over the efficacy of the talks, with Secretary of State Marco Rubio saying that "I'm not sure you can reach a deal with these guys" and Vice President JD Vance expressed frustration over the fact that Khamanei, who ran the country, did not participate in the negotiations, thereby placing obstacles on the path of diplomacy. The Iranian delegation was led by Foreign Minister Abbas Araghchi, while US representatives included Steve Witkoff, Jared Kushner and CENTCOM commander Admiral Brad Cooper.

Despite some initial false reports about direct talks, Araghchi did not meet face to face with any members of the US delegation and the entire session was mediated by Oman's foreign minister. The discussions focused on Iran's nuclear program and were described externally by Iranian officials as a "good start", while at the same time those leading Friday prayers within Iran dismissed the prospects of diplomacy in their sermons, a message likely coming from the office of Ali Khamenei. Both sides agreed to continue diplomatic engagement despite deep mistrust and disagreements over the agenda. Araghchi noted that further negotiations were agreed upon, though their date and manner were yet to be determined. According to Le Monde, Iran "sought to extend the process" of the negotiations, "aiming to delay the possibility" of a US attack" while the US "sought to secure an agreement as soon as possible."

Iranian government hardliners criticized the negotiations, while the government offered to dilute the remaining 60% enriched uranium in exchange for all sanctions being lifted. President Trump stated a second aircraft carrier would be sent to the Persian Gulf if a deal was unreachable. US missile launchers were erected in Qatar's Al Udeid airbase in defense preparation. The Chinese YLC-8B UHF-Band 3D long-range anti-stealth surveillance radar was reportedly deployed in Iran. Statements made by Iranian officials within Iran appeared to be much more hardline than those made abroad during the negotiations, pointing to a government that was unsure how much it was ultimately willing to compromise. Araghchi criticized German chancellor Merz after he called for more pressure on Iran tweeting "We are ready to further increase the pressure and to engage in talks that serve the purpose of a swift end to the Iranian nuclear program".

=== 2nd round ===
Ahead of the second meeting round Larijani met with Qatari's Emir Sheikh Tamim bin Hamad Al Thani for talks. Abbas Araghchi stated that they were negotiating for a nuclear peace deal better than Obama's JCPOA. He said that Iranian missiles were not the subject of the negotiations and should not be targeted by sanctions. Larijani stated that when a deal was reached, it could subsequently be expanded. Trump stated talks for a deal would resolve very quickly in the following month.

=== Iran's rejection of the US proposal ===
On February 17, Ali Khamenei declined to accept the nuclear peace agreement negotiation conditions set out by Trump and said that Trump won't be capable of deposing the Islamic Republic. He added that the United States Navy could be sunk, and he called for the restoration of trust and calm within the country. On March 2, US Middle East envoy Steve Witkoff revealed that Iran began recent nuclear talks by insisting on its "inalienable right" to enrich uranium, rejecting a US proposal for zero enrichment, and even boasting that its 460 kilograms of 60% enriched uranium could produce 11 nuclear bombs. Some experts suggested that the US negotiators misunderstood the Iranian proposal, including Iran's offer to suspend uranium enrichment for several years and why Iran did not trust the US offer of nuclear fuel supplies.

=== Ultimatum ===
On February 20, president Trump gave Iran a 10-day deadline to reach a deal or else the United States would attack Iran. On the same day, the Iranian minister of oil and energy said Iran would possibly sell oil to America if a nuclear deal was reached.

=== 3rd round ===
On February 25, Iranian foreign minister Abbas Araghchi stated that a "historic" agreement with the United States to avert military conflict was "within reach" ahead of renewed talks in Geneva. He emphasized that diplomacy must be prioritized to avoid further escalation. Despite high tensions and a significant US military buildup in the region, Araghchi reiterated on social media that Iran holds a "crystal clear" position against developing nuclear weapons, while defending its right to peaceful nuclear technology.

A third round of indirect talks mediated by Omani foreign minister Badr Al Busaid took place on February 26, at the residence of Oman's ambassador to the UN in Geneva, Switzerland. The talks happened in the morning and evening, with a pause for the American negotiators to meet a Ukrainian delegation, and focused on Iran's nuclear program. In the midst of this round of negotiations, it was reported by Wall Street Journal that the sides were far from reaching a deal as the US made tough demands. According to the Wall Street Journal report, "Steve Witkoff and Jared Kushner said Iran must destroy its three main nuclear sites—at Fordow, Natanz and Isfahan—and deliver all of its remaining enriched uranium to the US, officials said."

According to Bloomberg News, the Americans left Geneva disappointed with the results of the third round of talks; however, officials from Iran and the Oman mediators were more optimistic. Oman's foreign minister Badr Albusaidi hailed "significant progress" in a post on X. The Bloomberg report however also stated that "US and Iranian officials ended the latest round of nuclear talks in Geneva on Thursday by agreeing to reconvene as soon as next week, opening the door to further diplomacy even as President Donald Trump masses military forces in the region."

In contrast with the Wall Street Journal and Bloomberg reports, Oman's foreign minister reported that Iran had offered zero stockpiles of enriched uranium along with "full and comprehensive verification by the IAEA", which would ensure that Iran would never have a nuclear bomb. He said, "The single most important achievement, I believe, is the agreement that Iran will never ever have nuclear material that will create a bomb", He further stated that "Now we are talking about zero stockpiling, and that is very, very important because if you cannot stockpile material that is enriched, then there is no way that you can actually create a bomb."

While the US reinforced its military forces in the Middle East and anticipated attacks on its oil terminals ahead of the third round of talks, the Iranians accelerated loading tankers with 20 million oil barrels in 6 days, for export purposes. The Iranian security commission said they would drag all the countries in the region into war. On February 27, a day before the American and Israeli strikes began, a number of embassies were evacuated from Iran as the US State Department declared Iran a state sponsor of wrongful detention. According to the White House, Iran rejected a proposal for a civilian nuclear program with American investment in exchange for dismantling its nuclear program.

=== 4th round ===
Before the strikes against Iran, a fourth round of talks had been scheduled for the week following the third round. These talks were due to take place in Vienna, Austria. Prior to the strikes, Iranian foreign minister Abbas Araghchi told state TV that technical teams would meet in Vienna starting Monday, together with experts from the International Atomic Energy Agency.

On October 4, Iranian Foreign Ministry Spokesman Esmaeil Baghaei denied that Iran had agreed to allow inspectors to visit its nuclear sites in exchange for a reduction in sanctions. He stated that there had been no negotiations regarding nuclear issues.

Iran's security chief, Mohsen Rezaei, was quoted by state media on October 11 as saying that the United States' response to Iran’s seven conditions for reopening the strategically important Strait of Hormuz was "insufficient."

=== 5th round ===
According to Iranian officials, as of November 2026, Iran and the United States remain engaged in talks—mediated by Qatar—to end their eight-month-long conflict. The talks that started in Doha in early November are centered on unlocking more than $6 billion in Iranian funds, a step that might lead to the reopening of the strait and the renewal of discussions about Iran’s nuclear program. Abbas Araghchi, Iran’s Foreign Minister, mentioned that no direct talks with the U.S. are planned at this time. He stated that the outcome of these discussions depends on political decisions made by the United States. Qatar has also cautioned that any disturbances would harm the negotiation process, stressing that maintaining freedom of navigation in the Strait of Hormuz is crucial. Experts consider the mutual distrust between the United States and Iran a significant barrier to advancement. Additionally, before talks can resume, Iran has requested assurances such as the lifting of sanctions and the right to sell oil.

China and Russia have opposed any further military action, citing potential economic repercussions. Meanwhile, oil prices have declined. Anwar Gargash, an official from the UAE, highlighted the importance of maintaining stable relations with Iran, noting that increasing tensions benefits no one. Qatar is continuing its role as a mediator, despite a missile strike on one of its LNG tankers.

On November 2, the United States launched an attack on Iran's Qeshm Island, with President Donald Trump suggesting advancements in negotiations to end the ongoing conflict. Meanwhile, the Islamic Revolutionary Guard Corps (IRGC) announced that an American MQ-9 drone was shot down last night over the eastern part of the Strait of Hormuz. Iran has deemed Washington’s response to the seven conditions set for the reopening of the Strait of Hormuz “unconvincing.” Negotiations are still underway, centered on a proposal from Iran: the waterway will be reopened provided that sanctions are lifted and the U.S. ends its naval blockade.

== 2026 war ==
On March 1, 2026, Trump claimed that Iranian leaders wanted to resume negotiations and that he had agreed. The late Ali Larijani, Secretary of the Supreme National Security Council of Iran, ruled out talks. Trump then wrote, on March 6: "There will be no deal with Iran except UNCONDITIONAL SURRENDER!" On March 21, it was reported that the US was preparing for peace talks, with six demands. However, Iran refused to negotiate, and had previously rejected several of the demands.

On March 23, Trump postponed the ultimatum he had given on reopening the Strait of Hormuz, citing "very good and productive conversations" with Iran. He said the US had been speaking to "a top person" in Iran. IRGC-affiliated Fars News reported that no negotiations had taken place. Tasnim News Agency, affiliated with the IRGC, suggested that the US was trying to sow division within Iran by proposing secret talks with only part of its political establishment. Iran International, affiliated with the Iranian opposition, suggested that Trump was deliberately being vague and not naming which Iranians were negotiating, as a way to sow mistrust and division within the Iranian regime. The Iranian foreign ministry said it was reviewing US proposals sent through mediators.

Ebrahim Zolfaghari, spokesman for Khatam al-Anbiya Central Headquarters, rejected negotiations and said the US must accept "that regional stability is guaranteed by Iran's armed forces".

On March 25, Pakistani officials passed on a "15-point proposal" from the US to Iran. The US proposal included an end to Iran's nuclear program, limits on its missiles, reopening the Strait of Hormuz, restrictions on Iran's support for armed groups, and sanctions relief for Iran. The Iranians rejected the proposal. The Iranians issued a "five-point counter-proposal", including an end to US-Israeli attacks on Iran and pro-Iranian forces in Lebanon and Iraq, security guarantees to prevent future Israeli and US aggression, war reparations, and international recognition of Iranian sovereignty over the Strait of Hormuz. The US rejected the proposal.

In early April, Trump threatened to destroy Iran's power plants, oil wells and desalination plants if a deal was not reached "shortly" and the strait not reopened "immediately". On the same day, Iranian parliament speaker Mohammad Bagher Ghalibaf said that Iran would not give in to "surrender" terms from the US. He accused Washington of sending mixed signals, saying, "The enemy publicly sends messages of negotiation and dialogue, and in secret plans for a ground attack". On March 30, the Iranian foreign ministry acknowledged they had been holding indirect talks with the US through Pakistani intermediaries. By contrast, Qatar declined an offer to lead the negotiations.

Trump claimed on April 1 that Iran had just asked the US for a ceasefire. He said the US would consider it once the Strait of Hormuz was "open, free, and clear". The IRGC separately said that strait "will not be opened to the enemies of this nation". On April 5, Trump again threatened to attack Iran's power plants and bridges if the Hormuz Strait was not reopened. The following day, indirect talks in Islamabad led to a proposal for a 45-day ceasefire. Iran declined, calling for a permanent solution. An Iranian proposal, included a protocol for reopening the strait, an end to all conflicts, the lifting of sanctions, and reconstruction. Later that day, Trump said "They made a ... significant proposal. Not good enough...." On April 7, Trump threatened, "A whole civilization will die tonight, never to be brought back", if Iran did not reach an agreement with the US. Administration officials later confirmed the post was improvisational, and not part of a national security plan.

CNN determined that between March 23 and June 9, Trump had claimed at least 38 times that a deal was imminent.

=== Ceasefire ===
On April 7, the US and Iran announced a two-week ceasefire to begin the next day. Later that day, Israel launched massive airstrikes on Lebanon, killing more than 300 people. Iranian officials and Pakistani mediators said that the ceasefire was to include Lebanon, and Iran said it would end the ceasefire if Israel continued its attacks. Iranian national security adviser Mahdi Mohammadi said, "Without fully restraining America's rabid dog in Lebanon, there will be no ceasefire or negotiations, and the missiles are ready to launch". Israel said the ceasefire did not include Lebanon. On April 9, Israel agreed to hold direct talks with the Lebanese government under US pressure, but claimed that the ceasefire did not apply to Lebanon.

Trump claimed that the Iranians were "agreeing to all the things that they have to agree to". However, the strait did not reopen. The US began a mine-clearing operation.

On April 11, Vance, Witkoff, and Kushner arrived in Islamabad for peace talks. The Iranian delegation included Araghchi and Ghalibaf. On April 12, Vance left, saying that the negotiations produced no agreement. Baghaei said that the talks ended with gaps on major issues. Ghalibaf stated that trust had not been established.

Trump announced a US naval blockade of Iranian ports from April 13. On April 14, it was reported that US and Iranian teams were returning to Islamabad for talks to take place later in the week.

On April 15, Trump said that he wants the war with Iran to end swiftly. However, White House deputy chief of staff Stephen Miller said that Trump had a red line to not allow Iran to develop nuclear weapons, and he will use force if necessary to accomplish that. On April 25, Trump announced cancellation of an envoy trip for further rounds of talks with Iranian leaders at Islamabad, citing what he alleged was divisions within Iranian leadership.

=== Negotiation continues ===
As of May 17 President Trump has reportedly set five preconditions for Iranian regime to be able to resume deal negotiations:

1. Iran to deliver 400 kg of enriched uranium to the United States
2. Iran to maintain one operational nuclear facility.
3. Linking negotiations to a cessation of hostilities.
4. Refusing to release at least 25% of Iran's frozen assets.
5. Rejecting Iran's demand for reparations.

On May 24, 2026, reports indicated that the United States and Iran were nearing a broader peace agreement following months of conflict and stalled negotiations. US president Donald Trump stated that a memorandum of understanding was close to finalisation and suggested that the Strait of Hormuz could soon reopen under a ceasefire framework. According to media reports, the proposed agreement included a temporary moratorium on Iranian uranium enrichment, discussions over sanctions relief, and phased reopening of maritime trade routes in the Persian Gulf.

In May 2026, US president Donald Trump called for a significant expansion of the Abraham Accords as part of negotiations aimed at ending the Iran war. According to Trump, he urged Saudi Arabia, Qatar, Pakistan, Turkey, Egypt, and Jordan to join the accords and normalize relations with Israel in a coordinated, simultaneous manner, while noting that the United Arab Emirates and Bahrain were already signatories. Trump stated that he had spoken with leaders of the countries involved and described their participation as an integral component of a broader peace settlement involving Iran. He also suggested that Iran itself could potentially join the Abraham Accords following the conclusion of a peace agreement.

Pakistan publicly rejected the proposal, while other countries had not issued formal responses at the time of reporting.

On May 25, 2026, reports from international media indicated that the United States conducted military operations in southern Iran targeting missile launch sites and boats in the Strait of Hormuz. US Central Command (CENTCOM) described the actions as defensive strikes in response to perceived maritime threats. The incident occurred during ongoing ceasefire conditions and continued negotiations between the United States and Iran, and was reported by multiple outlets as contributing to heightened regional tensions.

On May 30 IRGC General Rezaei stated that they are going to be willing to attack the blockade if Trump betrays negotiations now while White House Deputy Chief of Staff Stephen Miller claimed Iranian regime has made significant concessions in the negotiations like reopening the strait. President Trump had given draft versions of MoU deal to various parties including Israel and Arab countries. Inside Iran the negotiations caused rift among several factions according to NYTimes.

In June 2026, the United States was considering redirecting Iranian frozen assets to Gulf states for reconstruction and repair costs linked to damage attributed to Iran. The proposal came amid indirect negotiations between the United States and Iran, while a peace deal was described as hinging on the release of $24 billion in Iranian assets frozen by the United States.

On June 15, 2026, US and Iranian officials reportedly reached a preliminary agreement on a framework aimed at extending the ceasefire and reopening the Strait of Hormuz, as well as ending hostilities in Lebanon. The agreement, described as a memorandum of understanding (MoU), is an initial framework and not a final peace agreement. It sets out a 60-day ceasefire period during which further talks are expected to address unresolved issues, including Iran's nuclear program, especially uranium enrichment levels and the status of its highly enriched uranium stockpiles.

The framework includes reopening the Strait of Hormuz to commercial shipping and lifting restrictions on maritime traffic, as well as discussions on sanctions relief and the possible release of up to $25 billion in frozen Iranian assets, depending on future compliance. Key issues, including the final status of Iran's nuclear program, remain unresolved and are expected to be discussed in later negotiations during the ceasefire period.

Following the digital signing, US and Iranian officials held extended talks at the Lake Lucerne Summit in Switzerland, mediated by Pakistan and Qatar, where discussions continued over the implementation of the agreement. Axios reported that the talks included plans for a High Level Committee to oversee implementation, as well as mechanisms related to maritime security in the Strait of Hormuz and de-escalation in Lebanon.

on 28 October 2026, Axios reported, Qatar is trying to mediate between the US and Iran with the backing of Pakistan, Saudi Arabia, Egypt and Turkey. Security officials from Saudi Arabia, Turkey and Pakistan recently travelled to Tehran. Officials from Saudi Arabia then requested the White House to allow more time for diplomatic efforts. Axios reported that officials from Saudi Arabia and Turkey also requested President Donald Trump to increase the timeframe for diplomatic efforts, while Israeli Prime Minister Benjamin Netanyahu pushed for a combined US-Israeli strike on Iran straight after the US midterm elections.On October 28, Donald Trump told Axios that talks with Iran were taking place through intermediaries, although he was uncertain whether they would lead to an agreement. On October 31, Iranian Foreign Minister Abbas Araghchi said that no meetings with US officials were planned and described reports of an imminent meeting as media speculation. He added that Qatari and Pakistani mediators were continuing consultations over Iran's conditions, while saying that any decision on direct or indirect talks with the United States would depend on those conditions being met. Reuters, however, reported that Iranian negotiators met Qatari mediators in Doha after more than 12 hours of discussions between Iranian and Qatari envoys in Tehran the previous day. A source briefed on the talks said the discussions were being coordinated through regular contacts with Washington. In a separate report published on October 30, Axios said that Qatari mediators had held more than 12 hours of talks in Tehran in an effort to establish the conditions for resuming direct negotiations between the United States and Iran. The report said the discussions would continue in Doha and that the mediators were in regular contact with the White House.

In November 2026, the United States-Iran conflict is ongoing, and Iran's parliament speaker, Mohammad Bagher Ghalibaf, expressed the need to move away from the current “no war and no peace” situation. Iran controls the Strait of Hormuz and has attacked vessels on unauthorized routes.

== Vance's letter to Rezaei ==
Amidst the U.S. midterm elections, on October 29, U.S. Vice President JD Vance sent a letter to Iranian official Mohsen Rezaei with the aim of resuming diplomatic negotiations. He calls on Iran to commit to restrictions on its nuclear program—specifically by granting access to the Strait of Hormuz—within one week, in exchange for the lifting of U.S. sanctions. However, Iran remains hesitant to make stringent commitments without guarantees that U.S. concessions—such as the lifting of oil export sanctions—will be permanent. A third party, likely China, might be required to ensure that both sides adhere to the agreements. Iranian negotiator Mohammad Ghalibaf insists that Iran has clear conditions, including the lifting of sanctions and a ceasefire in Lebanon. Iran also opposes allowing UN nuclear inspectors into the country.

The Wall Street Journal reported that the letter was sent to assess if the United States and Iran could reduce their disagreements enough to prevent a possible new series of U.S. strikes on Iran. According to a knowledgeable source cited by the Journal, the letter and the following talks did not include concrete peace terms but instead aimed to create a "potential framework for negotiations." Meanwhile, the New York Times stated that Vance's letter suggests arranging a meeting between U.S. and Iranian officials soon.

== Aftermath ==
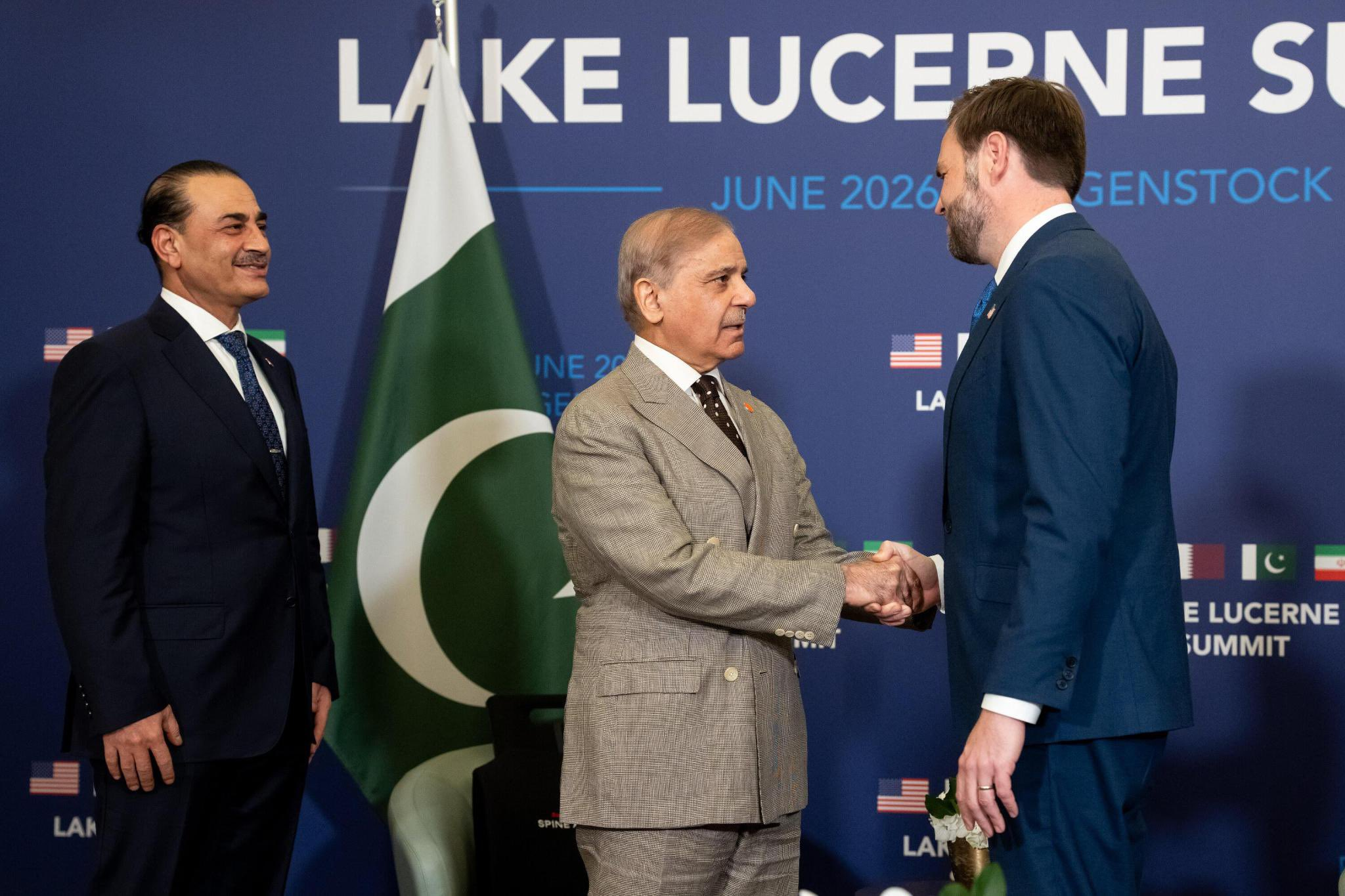
Vice President JD Vance meeting with Pakistani prime minister Shehbaz Sharif and Field Marshal Asim Munir for negotiations on 20 June 2026

On 18 June 2026, the scheduled technical phase of talks between US and Iran in Switzerland were postponed. US president Donald Trump denied $300 billion or $300 million government fund to Iran and/or any government investment in the country and called it fake news not part of the Iran deal, and said if Israel was provoked by Iran he would back further Israeli attacks on Iran, and that anyone selling Iran nukes would be getting nuked themselves. He defended the Iran MOU at the G7 in France by saying a prolonged war could have caused an "economic catastrophe," and explicitly said he did not want to be like former US president Herbert Hoover.

While negotiations took to their finalization stage Iran still kept its parliament shutdown. Iran's Supreme National Security Council stated at the time that ceasefire violations won't be tolerated, that Iranian soldiers will soon respond.

President Trump claimed the Iran deal perhaps is unconditional surrender of Iran. Responding to widespread criticism from Israel, US vice president JD Vance called for Israeli support and stated "Trump is your only ally left in world". President Trump said those who oppose Iran deal are either bad people, fools or jealous.

One 18 June, Iranian Supreme Leader Mojtaba Khamenei released a written statement, declaring that he endorsed the memorandum of understanding despite reservations.

On 19 June, President Trump announced a renewed ceasefire between Israel and Hezbollah.

On 20 June, Trump announced that there will be no tolls for passage through the Strait of Hormuz during or after the 60-day ceasefire with Iran. However, if peace talks do not succeed, the US may implement a toll for "services rendered as the Guardian Angel to the countries of the Middle East" for reimbursement of costs incurred in the past, present, and future.

On 21 June, Trump issued a threat to invade Iran if they closed the Strait of Hormuz, following Iran's claim of its closure due to Israeli strikes in Lebanon. He warned that they "won't even make it back to their f***ing country," suggesting a potential threat against Iranian negotiators in Switzerland.

On 26 June, Gulf Cooperation Council foreign ministers released a statement declaring that any deal with Tehran should include limiting Iran missiles capability. The US and Iranian militaries established a coordination center in Doha to manage disputes and de-escalate tensions.

On 26 June, Trump accused Iran of violating the truce with US by launching drone attacks on ships in the Hormuz. The United States Central Command later announced that in retaliation to the alleged truce violations, the US hit Iranian missile and drone storage facilities, as well as coastal radar stations. Iran said that its retaliation to the attack will be "swift and decisive," prior to deleting the statement.

On 27 June, Iran said it targeted American sites in the Gulf region in response to the attack. The same day, the US military announced it struck Iranian military surveillance infrastructure, communication systems, air defense sites, drone storage facilities, and minelayer capabilities at the commander-in-chief's direction in retaliation to another alleged Iranian attack against a ship in the Hormuz. Trump accused Iran of repeatedly violating the ceasefire memorandum, expressing doubt about their ability to learn from past mistakes. He warned of a potential point where the US will be forced to militarily "complete the job", stating that if this occurs, the Iranian regime could cease to exist.

On 28 June, Iran said it fired ballistic missiles and drones towards the US Ali Al Salem Air Base in Kuwait and the US Fifth Fleet headquarters in Bahrain in retaliation to American attacks against five Iranian coastal sites.

On 8 July, the ceasefire agreement between the US and Iran broke after Iran launched attacks on commercial vessels in the Strait of Hormuz to assert Iranian sovereignty over the Strait of Hormuz, startling US officials and shattering a brief diplomatic calm.

== Impacts' Analysis ==
Iran offered to open strait to Gulf countries for $40 billion. The US Department of War's spent $40 billion on Iran's operation and requested additional $87.6 billion funding for total $127.6 billion. The US dollar gained while Chinese Yen dropped to a 40-year low on news of deal. Cost of fertilizer went up 40% post-war. Iran exported $40 million barrels of oil since June 15 due to waiver and oil reached $70. Iran could sell $3 billion within 60 days.

== Reactions ==
=== Public opinion ===
In a government poll as of 20 June 2026 nearly 60% of Iranians reported they were unable to continue with their lives financially and 70% of the population demanded government changes. The Reagan Institute Summer Survey found that 51% of MAGA Republicans wanted regime change in Iran while 25% demanded war settlement. Quantus Insights survey found 56% of likely voters would support the Iran deal. YouGov CBS poll reported 67%- 80% of Republicans consider deal good for US and Iran. Associated Press poll found 65% of Americans disapprove of Trump handling of Iran war. Survey from Hebrew University of Jerusalem claimed 92% of poll takers think Israel won the war. A Reuters/Ipsos poll from April reported 24% of Americans thought war was worth it. An ABC News/Washington Post/Ipsos reported 65% of population are not confident in nuclear deal with Iran.Ghalibaf said that the US and Israel were militarily much stronger than Iran, so they could not be "destroyed", but a beneficial deal with them may be possible.

=== Iran ===
In April 2025 BBC reported that Araghchi stated he wanted to speak with Europeans in Berlin, Paris and London. Ali Khamenei told his supporters not to protest or insult the talks and that these talks were just a delay until the Islamic Shiite state was established. Mehdi Kouchakzadeh stated that the Iranian parliament had received no official information about the ongoing negotiations. He added that, although the outcome was unfavorable, they would not oppose it. The Iranian Rial slightly gained and the Tehran Stock Exchange rose 2.16%. The pro-government newspaper Kayhan claimed that Iran had the upper hand, that nuclear disarmament was impossible, and called for the assassination of Trump. The talks also caused division and drift among members of the ultra extremist Front of Islamic Revolution Stability party. Iran charged two newspaper media executives for their coverage of the talks.

Among the opposition, Reza Pahlavi called on the United States to take out the vulnerable and unstable Iranian regime rather than engaging in talks. Iranian dissidents and social media users have increasingly speculated that the former US embassy in Tehran, seized in 1979 might be returned to American control. Opposition outlet Kayhan London described the talks as a major failure of the Iranian regime, and believed that the Iranian people are gaining the upper hand.

Many Iranians within the country have urged Trump to not engage in negotiations with the Iranian government, but rather to support "a nationwide struggle for freedom and democracy." An Iranian man posted a video in English begging Trump and Western governments to not negotiate with Iran before he committed suicide. On February 18, 2026, an analysis published in Axios said that there were no signs of a breakthrough in negotiations, making war look the most likely option.

Since the outbreak of the 2026 Iran war, reactions have been very mixed among the Iranian public. Some Iranians have supported the war, with government supporters calling it a "holy war" and opponents believing it would further weaken the Islamic Republic. On the other hand, others have rejected war because of the physical and emotional devastation, and instead called for a ceasefire. The reactions to the 2026 Iran war ceasefire has also been very mixed, with some feeling disappointed about the lack of change in the country's internal crisis, while others are relieved about the pause in fighting. Most respondents expressed uncertainty about domestic effects of the ceasefire, including the effects it will have on the national internet blackout, towards state executions in Iran, and for the possibilities of regime change from the Iranian opposition.

Ebrahim Rezaei, spokesman for the Iranian parliament's national security committee, said that Iran will not agree to extend the ceasefire if it does not include Iranian control of the Strait of Hormuz.

=== United States ===
In May 2025, the national survey Rasmussen Reports reported that 57% of Americans supported an attack on Iran. Former chief negotiator and Secretary of State John Kerry commended Trump's effort and compared the negotiations to "Khomeini poisoned chalice". White House Press Secretary Karoline Leavitt has stated that should Iran develop nukes, there will be "all hell to pay". On April 18, Secretary of State Marco Rubio urged European countries to quickly decide on reimposing sanctions against Iran, warning that Iran is violating the existing agreement and nearing the capability to develop a nuclear weapon. Rubio later also said Iran can have a civilian nuclear energy program instead of a military WMD atomic weapons program. Secretary of Defense Pete Hegseth and national security advisor Mike Waltz were reportedly divided on whether US military should attack Iran. Trump told reporters he was in no rush to attack Iran and it still has a chance to "live happily without death". He also said the US would lead the pack in possibly attacking Iran and that there are only two alternatives, bombing them viciously or nicely, and that he was still undecided.

Former special representative for Iran Elliott Abrams argued that Trump did not seek war. However, should the talks fail, Iran's nuclear program should be destroyed by Israel and/or the US Political commentator Tucker Carlson argued this was the worst time for US military intervention in Iran. It was reported that Witkoff and Kushner told Trump that it would be "difficult, if not impossible" to reach a deal with Iran. After talks fell through, leading to the armed conflict, Witkoff blamed Iran for trying to "strong-arm" the US team, and said the Iranian insistence on enrichment hampered a deal. He also claimed the Iranians boasted about having deceived monitors. During the 2026 State of the Union Address, Trump said that he preferred a diplomatic solution, but he would not allow Iran to get nuclear weapons.

=== Israel ===
While President Trump is pursuing a peace agreement regarding Iran, Prime Minister Benjamin Netanyahu's government remains committed to dismantling Iranian and Hezbollah capabilities. The spying allegations come amid this strategic divide. The US Defense Intelligence Agency has reportedly elevated the counterintelligence threat posed by Israel. Recent US intelligence reports indicate that Israeli spy agencies have allegedly been eavesdropping on American negotiators, specifically those working on a potential peace deal with Iran. Israeli embassy in Washington has denied the allegations.

On June 15, 2026, following reports of a preliminary agreement between the United States and Iran that reportedly included provisions for ending the war, including in Lebanon, Yedioth Ahronoth reported that Benjamin Netanyahu told the President of the United States that Israel does not consider itself “bound” by the Lebanon clause in the emerging agreement. According to the report, Netanyahu emphasized that Israel would not withdraw from Lebanon and that its military forces would remain in their current positions. The same source stated that Israeli officials said Israel would not accept any agreement that restricts its freedom of action against Hezbollah, and that operations against Hezbollah threats would continue. It was also reported that the Israeli military would remain in its current positions in Lebanon and continue actions aimed at targeting Hezbollah infrastructure.

=== International ===
Global gold prices grew given reports of high chances of war. Initially oil futures prices dropped 1.4%. Saudi Arabia praised the negotiations at further restraining Iran. Israel supported deweaponization of Iranian atomic energy establishments following a "Libya model" like that of the disarmament of Libya. Trump revealed Israel would lead a military attack on Iran if it failed to abandon its nuclear weapons program. Al Monitor reported that China had also come to support the Iranian government through strengthened relations.

In March 2026, The Guardian reported that UK National Security Adviser Jonathan Powell had secretly attended US–Iran nuclear negotiations in Geneva, accompanied by a technical team from the Cabinet Office. The report stated that Powell's assessment indicated a diplomatic breakthrough was possible. Additionally, the publication cited a Gulf diplomat who alleged that US intermediaries Steve Witkoff and Jared Kushner were acting in Israeli interests to pressure the United States into a military confrontation.

Oman's foreign minister and lead mediator Badr bin Hamad Al Busaidi commented after the outbreak of hostilities in March 2026, that negotiations over the nuclear programme had been making progress and continued, that the US-Israeli war against Iran was solely an attempt to reorder the Middle East in Israel's favour. In a March 2026 opinion piece for The Economist, Badr Albusaidi claimed the United States had "lost control of its own foreign policy" and accused Israel of persuading the Trump administration to engage in a war with Iran, which he termed a "grave miscalculation" and a "catastrophe".

== Controversies ==
Qatari prime minister Mohammed bin Abdulrahman bin Jassim Al Thani allegedly ignored US vice president JD Vance on June 21, 2026, while functioning as a mediator in the negotiations to end the two countries' war. Sheikh Mohammed denied accusations that he snubbed Vance, claiming that they spent hours together during negotiations and had a solid collaboration throughout.

== See also ==
- 2025–2026 Iranian protests
- 2025 United States–Houthi ceasefire
- Abraham Accords
- Iran Nuclear Achievements Protection Act
- Iran Prosperity Project
- Iranian financial crisis
- List of diplomatic missions of Iran
- Middle Eastern crisis (2023–present)
- Nuclear Command Corps
- Port of Shahid Rajaee explosion
- Supreme Nuclear Committee of Iran
- 2026 United States military buildup in the Middle East
- 2026 Iran war
