= Darkhovin Nuclear Power Plant =

Planned nuclear power plant in Darkhovin, Khuzestan, Iran

- Country: Iran
- Location: Darkhovin
- Coordinates: 30°42′28″N 48°22′48″E
- Status: Construction started; in early stages as of 2026
- Construction began: 2022
- Owner: Nuclear Power Production & Development Co. of Iran
- Operators: Nuclear Power Production & Development Co. of Iran

Power generation
- Units planned: 1 × 360 MW
- Units under const.: 1 × 360 MW

The Darkhovin Nuclear Power Plant (also known as Esteghlal Nuclear Power Plant or Karoon) is a long-planned nuclear power plant to be located in Khuzestan province, about 70 kilometers south of Ahvaz at the Karun river, in south-western Iran.

Planning for the reactor precedes the 1979 Iranian Revolution. The construction of one reactor was in the early stages as of 2026, while two other projects on the site had been cancelled.

According to the Atomic Energy Organization of Iran (AEOI) the United States attacked the construction site of the plant on July 19, 2026. The International Atomic Energy Agency (IAEA) said that the facility is in the “very early stages of construction” and that it did not contain any nuclear material at the time of its most recent inspection. Therefore any attack was not likely to pose any radiological risk.

== History ==
=== Early years ===
Before the 1979 Iranian Revolution, Iran signed a US$2 billion contract with French company Framatome to build two 910 megawatt (MW) pressurized water reactors at Darkhovin. It was to be located on a 50-hectare piece of land next to the Karun River, near the city of Darkhovin in Shadegan County in Khuzestan province, Iran. After the Revolution, France withdrew from the project, and the engineering components of the plant were withheld in France. The components were then used by France to build units 5 and 6 of Gravelines Nuclear Power Station in France, which went online in 1985.

=== 1980–99 ===
Construction of the power station was halted during the 1980-88 Iran–Iraq War. In 1992, Iran signed an agreement with China to build two 300 MW reactors at the site. They were to be completed within 10 years, and the plan was for them to be similar to Chashma Nuclear Power Plant in Pakistan, which was built with China's collaboration. Later, China withdrew from the project under United States pressure.

=== 2000–19 ===
The project was resumed by Iran, as no other country was ready to cooperate in its construction. Iran started to indigenously design the reactor for Darkhovin Nuclear Power Plant, basing the design on the Iranian IR-40 reactor (officially the Khondab Heavy Water Research Reactor), using heavy water. The Iranian nuclear reactor design has a capacity of 360 MW. The plant was announced in 2008, originally scheduled to come online in 2016, but construction was delayed.

=== 2020–present ===
There is currently no public information on how many reactors the power station is planned to house. The plant was planned to be Iran's first indigenously designed and built nuclear power plant, besides the research reactor of IR-40.<ref[>http://www.redorbit.com/news/science/352355/iran_press_official_provides_details_on_native_iranian_nuclear_plant/] </ref> According to the head of the AEOI, Ali Akbar Salehi, Swiss-Swedish technology conglomerate ABB was retained as a partner/external consultant in this project, but pulled out because of the international sanctions against Iran.

In May 2022, the deputy head of the AEOI said that planning for the construction of an indigenous 360 MWe plant was in progress. In December 2022, Iranian state TV announced that construction of an indigenous 300 MW plant had started, expected to take eight years to build, and cost about $1.5 to $2 billion.

According to the AEOI the US attacked the construction site of the Darkhovin nuclear power plant at around 3:39 am local time on Sunday, July 19, 2026 and struck the under-construction nuclear power plant with several projectiles. The IAEA is looking into this report. It said that the facility is in the “very early stages of construction” and that it did not contain any nuclear material at the time of its most recent inspection. Therefore any attack on this site was not likely to pose any radiological risk.

== Reactor data ==
Plans for the site are not clear.

Reactor unit	Reactor type	Net capacity	Gross capacity	Construction started	Electricity Grid	Commercial Operation	Shutdown
Darkhovin	Pressurized Water Reactor	330 MW	360 MW	2008	-	-	-
Estehlal-1	Pressurized Water Reactor	280 MW	300 MW	Cancelled Plan			
Estehlel-2	Pressurized Water Reactor	280 MW	300 MW	Cancelled Plan			

== In fiction ==
In the 1976 novel by Paul Erdman, Crash of '79, the Darkhovin Nuclear Power Plant is mentioned to have been completed by France. Mohammed Reza Pahlavi, the then Shah of Iran, uses the plant with help from Israel and Switzerland to manufacture a dozen salted bombs.

== See also ==
- Bushehr Nuclear Power Plant
- Fordow Fuel Enrichment Plant
- Green Salt Project
- Isfahan Nuclear Technology/Research Center
- List of power stations in Iran
- Natanz Nuclear Facility
- Nuclear program of Iran
- Oghab 2
- Operation Merlin
- Supreme Nuclear Committee of Iran
