= Schummer =

Schummer is a surname. Notable people with the surname include:

- Jos Schummer (1930–1980), Luxembourgish wrestler
- Raymond Schummer (1937–2009), Luxembourgish wrestler
- Uwe Schummer (born 1957), German politician (CDU)

== See also ==
- Schumer for people with the surname Schumer
