= Bushehr Nuclear Power Plant =

Power station in Bushehr County, Iran

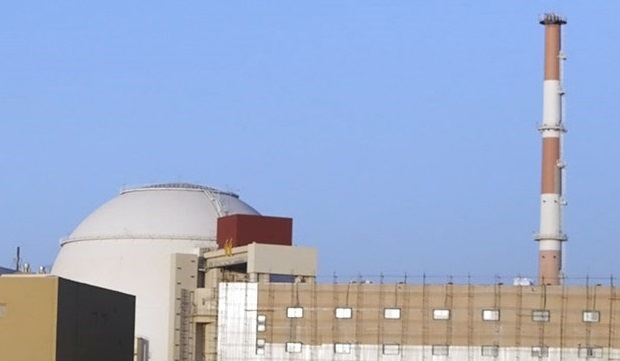

- Location within Iran
- Official name: نیروگاه اتمی بوشهر
- Country: Iran
- Location: Bushehr
- Coordinates: 28°49′46.64″N 50°53′09.46″E
- Status: Operational
- Construction began: 1 May 1975; 1995; 2016
- Commission date: 3 September 2011
- Owners: Masna, Atomic Energy Organization of Iran
- Operators: Masna, Atomic Energy Organization of Iran

Nuclear power station
- Reactor type: VVER-1000/446
- Reactor supplier: Atomstroyexport
- Site elevation: 20 m (66 ft)

Power generation
- Units operational: 1 × 1030 MW
- Make and model: LMZ; Electrosila
- Units cancelled: 1 × 915 MW
- Units under const.: 2 × 1000 MW
- Nameplate capacity: 1000 MW

External links
- Commons: Related media on Commons

The Bushehr Nuclear Power Plant (Persian: نیروگاه اتمی بوشهر) is a nuclear power plant in Iran, located 17 kilometres (11 mi) southeast of the city of Bushehr, 1,200 kilometres (750 mi) south of Tehran, between the fishing villages of Halileh and Bandargeh along the Persian Gulf.

Construction of the plant was started in 1975 by German companies, but the work was stopped in 1979 after the Islamic revolution of Iran. The site was repeatedly bombed during the Iran–Iraq War. Later, a contract for finishing the plant was signed between Iran and the Russian Ministry for Atomic Energy in 1995, with Russia's Atomstroyexport named as the main contractor. The work was delayed several years by technical and financial challenges as well as by political pressure from the West. After construction was again in danger of being stopped in 2007, a renewed agreement was reached in which the Iranians promised to compensate for rising costs and inflation after completion of the plant. Delivery of nuclear fuel started in 2007. The plant started adding electricity to the national grid in September 2011, and opened in September 2011, attended by Russian Energy Minister Sergei Shmatko and head of the Rosatom Sergey Kiriyenko.

The project is considered unique in terms of its technology, the political environment and the challenging physical climate. It is the first civilian nuclear power plant built in the Middle East. Several research reactors had been built earlier in the Middle East: two in Iraq, two in Israel, one in Syria and three in Iran.

In August 2013, the head of Russian nuclear regulator Rosatom said that the state company would soon sign documents transferring operational control of the Bushehr nuclear power plant to Iran, and on 23 September 2013, operational control was transferred.

In November 2014, Iran and Russia signed an agreement to build two new nuclear reactors at the Bushehr site, with an option of six more at other sites later. Construction started in March 2017.

Iran claimed the area near the plant was attacked four times during the 2026 Iran war as of 5 April 2026, killing at least one plant employee, while the IAEA reported no radiation level rise.

== Bushehr-1 ==
=== Inception ===
The facility was the idea of the Shah Mohammad Reza Pahlavi. He wanted a national electrical grid powered by nuclear power plants. Bushehr would be the first plant, and would supply energy to the inland city of Shiraz. In August 1974, the Shah said, "Petroleum is a noble material, much too valuable to burn... We envision producing, as soon as possible, 23,000 megawatts (MW) of electricity using nuclear plants".

=== Construction by German companies ===
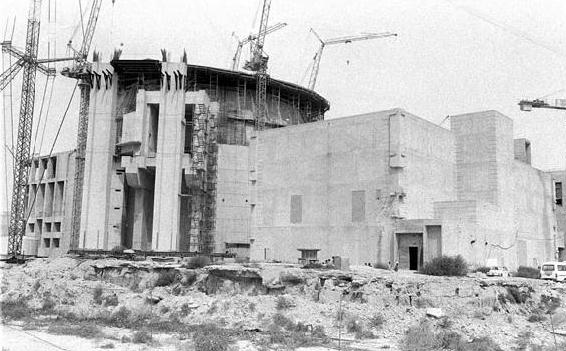
Construction of the Bushehr Nuclear Power Plant in the 1970s

In 1975, German Kraftwerk Union AG, a joint venture of Siemens and AEG-Telefunken, signed a contract worth US$4–6 billion to build the pressurized water reactor nuclear power plant. The work was begun in the same year. The two 1,196 MWe reactors, subcontracted to ThyssenKrupp for building the containment, was identical with the second reactor unit B of the German Biblis Nuclear Power Plant. The first reactor was to be finished by 1980 and the second one by 1981.

Around 5,500 Germans lived in the camp belonging to the construction site, including around 2,800 family members. The infrastructure included the German school abroad in Bushehr, the hospital and an own television studio. There has never been another German construction site abroad on this scale.

Kraftwerk Union was eager to work with the Iranian government because, as its spokesman said in 1976, "To fully exploit our nuclear power plant capacity, we have to land at least three contracts a year for delivery abroad. The market here is about saturated, and the United States has cornered most of the rest of Europe, so we have to concentrate on the third world."

Kraftwerk Union fully withdrew from the Bushehr nuclear project in July 1979, after work stopped in January 1979, with one reactor 50% complete, and the other reactor 85% complete. They said they based their action on Iran's non-payment of $450 million in overdue payments. The company had received $2.5 billion of the total contract. Their cancellation came after certainty that the Iranian government would unilaterally terminate the contract themselves, following the 1979 Iranian Revolution, which led to a crisis in Iran's relations with the West. Shortly afterwards, Iraq invaded Iran and the nuclear program was stopped until the end of the war.

In 1984, Kraftwerk Union did a preliminary assessment to see if it could resume work on the project, but declined to do so while the Iran–Iraq War continued. In April of that year, the U.S. State Department said, "We believe it would take at least two to three years to complete construction of the reactors at Bushehr." The spokesperson also said that the light water power reactors at Bushehr "are not particularly well-suited for a weapons program." The spokesman went on to say, "In addition, we have no evidence of Iranian construction of other facilities that would be necessary to separate plutonium from spent reactor fuel." The reactors were then damaged by multiple Iraqi air strikes from 1984 to 1988, during the Iran–Iraq War.

=== Continuation of work by Russia's Atomstroyexport ===
In 1990, Iran began to look outwards towards partners for its nuclear program; however, due to a radically different political climate and punitive U.S. economic sanctions, few candidates existed.

A Russian–Iranian intergovernmental outline for construction and operation of two reactor units at Bushehr was signed on 25 August 1992. Two years later, Russian specialists toured the site for the first time to assess the damage done to the partially complete plant by the passage of time and by air raids during the Iran–Iraq War. The final contract between Iran and Russia's Ministry for Atomic Energy (Minatom) was signed on 8 January 1995. Russia's main contractor for the project, Atomstroyexport, would install a V-320 915 MWe VVER-1000 pressurized water reactor into the existing Bushehr I building, with commissioning originally expected in 2001.

=== Difficulties ===
The Bushehr Nuclear Plant project is considered unique in terms of technology, the political environment and the challenging physical climate. Financial problems, inflation, and the need to integrate German and Russian technology have made the project difficult for the participants.

After the dissolution of the Soviet Union, the Russian government ended its subsidies to contractors building power plants for foreign customers, putting Atomstroyexport in financial difficulties. Another obstacle was the shortage of Russian engineers and technicians with suitable experience. The last nuclear plant built in the Soviet Union was the No. 6 reactor at Zaporizhzhia in Ukraine, which is why Ukrainian specialists were invited to work in Iran after they had finished the work at Zaporizhzhia.

The 1995 contract with Iran stipulated that a share of construction and installation jobs would be reserved for Iranian subcontractors. These companies were inexperienced and had been only minimally involved in the German project, which resulted in what should have been a one-year task taking over three years (1995–1997). Due to these difficulties, in 1998 Minatom pushed through an agreement that Atomstroyexport would finish the first reactor on its own. The agreement was signed on 29 August 1998 as an addendum to the main contract.

The extremely hot and humid climate of the Bushehr area, with significant amounts of brine in the air due to the proximity of the ocean, represented a special challenge for the construction. In such conditions, even stainless steel can rust, and a special painting technology had to be developed to protect the station's structural elements. In the summer the temperatures can reach 50 °C (122 °F). While the German companies worked at the site, the workers had a special clause in their contracts to allow them to stop working during the summer heat waves.

German engineers had left behind a total of 80,000 pieces of equipment and structural elements, with little technical documentation. The Iranian side insisted that the German hardware must be integrated in the Russian VVER-1000 design. Germany refused to help in the construction, mostly for political reasons, as Iran was under an embargo for nuclear plant components. Therefore, it was decided to take stock of the existing equipment using only Russian expertise.

The 1998 addendum to the construction contract put the final value of the project at just over $1 billion. After that, the sum was not adjusted for inflation, resulting in funding shortages which almost again halted work.

In 2001, several items for the NPP—in particular, the footing for the reactor and four 82-ton water tanks—were manufactured on Atommash, Russia's nuclear engineering flagship.

=== Revised contract ===
In response to American and European pressure on Russia, a new revised agreement was reached in September 2006, under which fuel deliveries to Bushehr were scheduled to start in March 2007 and the plant was due to come on stream in September 2007 after years of delays. In February 2007, the work on the site faltered due to funding shortages, and Atomstroyexport reduced the number of employees working on the site from 3,000 to just 800. During subsequent negotiations, Atomstroyexport even contemplated pulling out of the project. In the end, an agreement was reached, under which the Iranians would compensate for the growing cost of equipment and engineering works once the reactor went live. A top Iranian nuclear official claimed that the Russians were deliberately delaying and politicising the project under European and American pressure.

Prior to the contract revision, the price was about a third that of a contemporary reactor, at just over $1 billion, reflecting the year of the original contract and that it was the first post-Soviet nuclear export order. Increased material costs and currency fluctuations had made completion at that price difficult.

According to Moscow Defense Brief, until 2005 Washington exerted considerable diplomatic pressure on Russia to stop the project, as the US administrations viewed it as evidence of Russia's indirect support for the alleged Iranian nuclear arms program. The United States also tried to persuade other countries to ban their companies from taking part. For example, Ukraine's Turboatom was to supply a turbine, but cancelled the deal after the US Secretary of State Madeleine Albright's visit to Kyiv on 6 March 1998. The United States lifted its opposition to the project in 2005, partly due to the deal signed by Moscow and Tehran, under which spent fuel from the plant would be sent back to Russia.

=== Finishing the plant ===
In 2007, according to Moscow Defense Brief, Russia made a strategic decision to finish the plant, and in December 2007 started to deliver nuclear fuel to the site. On 20 January 2008 a fourth Russian shipment of nuclear fuel arrived. Russia has pledged to sell 85 tons of nuclear fuel to the plant.

In March 2009, the head of Russia's state nuclear power corporation Rosatom, Sergei Kiriyenko, announced that Russia had completed the construction of the plant. A series of pre-launch tests were conducted after the announcement.

On 22 September 2009, it was reported that the first reactor was 96% complete and final testing would begin in the near future. In early October final testing was started. In January 2010, Kiriyenko announced to the public that the Bushehr reactor would be opening in the near-future, declaring 2010 the "year of Bushehr."

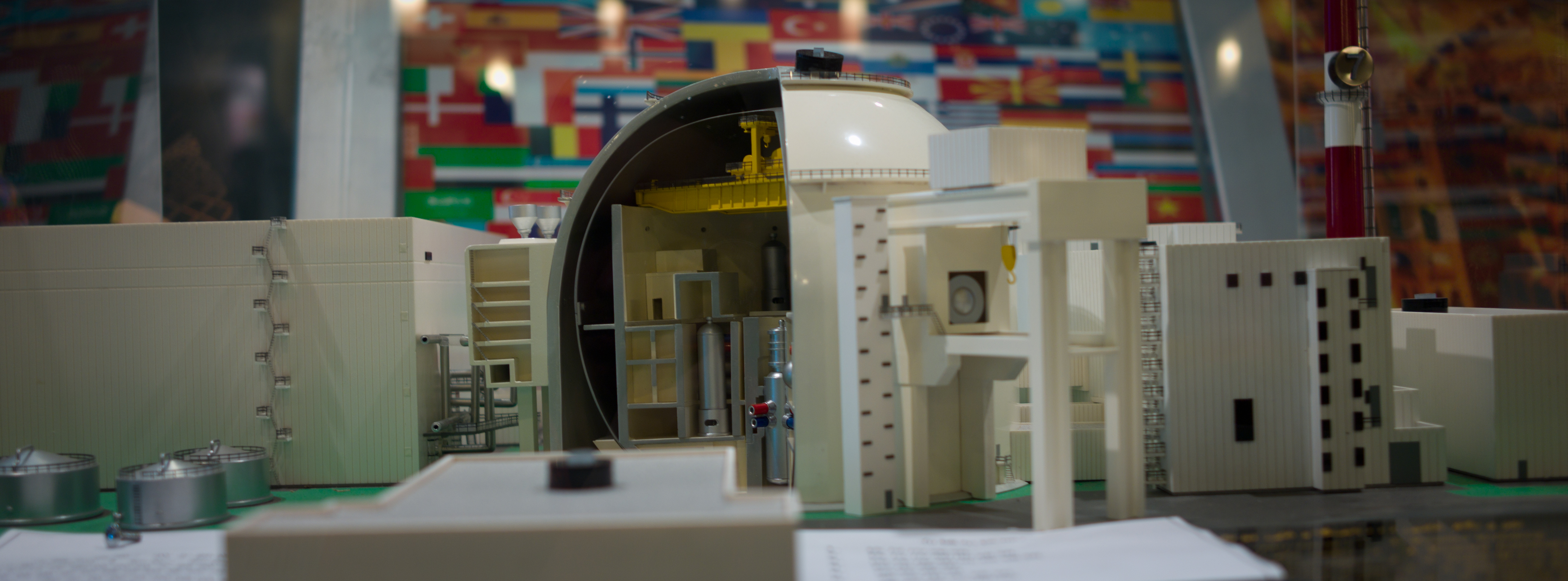
A model of the Bushehr Nuclear Power Plant

=== August 2010 fuel loading ===
On 13 August 2010, Russia announced that fuel would be loaded into the plant beginning on 21 August, which would mark the beginning of the plant being considered an active nuclear facility. Within six months after the fuel loading, the plant was planned to be fully operational.

An official launch ceremony was held on 21 August 2010 as Iran began loading the plant with fuel. At the ceremony, Iranian nuclear chief Alki Akbar Salahei said:

"Despite all pressure, sanctions and hardships imposed by western nations, we are now witnessing the startup of the largest symbol of Iran's peaceful nuclear activities."

Although they have opposed the project in the past, Western governments now stress that they have no objection to the demonstrably peaceful aspects of Iran's nuclear programme such as Bushehr, according to the BBC. Spokesman of the United States State Department, Darby Holladay, stated that the United States believes the reactor is designed to produce civilian nuclear power and does not view it as a proliferation risk as long as the Russians were responsible for the fuel.

On 27 November 2010, the head of the Atomic Energy Organization of Iran declared that "All fuel assemblies have been loaded into the core of the reactor" and they were hoping that the facility "will hook up with the national grid in one or two months".

The plant is to be operated by Russian specialists. Russia also provides the nuclear fuel for the plant, and spent fuel is sent back to Russia. The Bushehr plant will satisfy about 2% of Iran's projected electricity consumption.

The former head of Pakistan's Inter-Services Intelligence hailed Iran's launch as a positive move in the Muslim world, and he also said that an anti-Iran campaigns by the US and Israel stems from Iran's Islamic status.

=== May 2011 sustained nuclear reaction ===
In February 2011, Rosatom announced that one of the reactor's four main cooling pumps, from the original German reactor, had suffered damage. Thoroughly cleaning the reactor of metal particles required the removal of the fuel core, resulting in a startup delay. The reactor achieved a sustained nuclear reaction at 11:12 on 8 May 2011 and ran at a minimum power level for final commissioning tests.

=== September 2011 connection to the grid ===
The plant was connected to the national grid on 3 September 2011, and the official inauguration was held on 12 September. By the inauguration time the plant had the capacity to run at 40% capacity, while the full projected capacity of the first unit is 1,000 megawatts. The opening ceremony was attended by Energy Minister of Russia Sergei Shmatko and head of the Russian Federal Atomic Energy Agency (Rosatom) Sergei Kiriyenko, AEOI Director Fereydoun Abbasi, Iranian Energy Minister Majid Namjou and a number of Iranian MPs.

Under the terms of Russia–Iran agreement, approved by the International Atomic Energy Agency, Russia will be responsible for operating the plant, supplying the nuclear fuel and managing the spent fuel for the next two or three years before passing full control to Iran. Before the plant will reach full capacity in November, it will be disconnected from the grid for several weeks to make a number of tests.

=== February 2012 almost full capacity ===
Director Fereydoun Abbasi announced on 15 February that the Bushehr nuclear power plant had reached 75 percent of its power generation capacity. Abbasi was quoted "that hopefully the Bushehr plant will be connected to the national grid at its full capacity in late April."

=== August 2012 full capacity ===
On 30 August at 18:47 local time, the power unit 1 was brought to 100 percent of its power generation capacity.

=== 2013 commercial power launch ===
In September 2013, the Bushehr plant began producing power for the power grid. For two years the plant was operated by Iranian staff with the assistance of Russian specialists, after which Iran received sole control of the plant. The first refueling of the reactor was completed in July 2014.

=== 2021 emergency shutdown ===
On 19 June 2021, the power plant's reactor underwent an emergency shutdown due to unspecified reasons that would last at least three to four days for repairs. It was also stated that power outages could result because of the shutdown. It resumed operations on 3 July 2021.

=== 2026 Iran war ===
Iran claimed the area near the plant was attacked 85 times during the 2026 Iran war as of 5 April 2026, killing at least one plant employee, while the IAEA reported no radiation level rise.

== Bushehr phase 98 ==
On 11 November 2014, Iran and Russia signed an agreement to build two new nuclear reactors at the Bushehr site, with an option of six more at other sites later.

Russia's State Atomic Energy Corporation, Rosatom, started site preparation of the two unit VVER-1000 nuclear power plant with a combined capacity of 2100 MWe in September 2016. On 14 March 2017 construction formally started. Units 2 and 3 are planned to be completed in 2026. First concrete was poured in November 2019.

On 17 November 2025, the head of Rosatom, Alexey Likhachev, stated that a total of about 3,000 specialists were working at the Bushehr nuclear power plant in Iran, out of whom 700 were Russian, which included some of the corporation's most qualified personnel. Likhachev also reported that the plant’s first unit has already produced around 75 billion kWh of electricity, and two additional 1,000-MW power units were still under construction.

== Russian–Iranian relations ==
The total cost of the project is estimated to be over €3 billion including the payments to both Russia and Germany. The original 1995 contract with the 1998 addendum was worth $1 billion and was not adjusted for inflation. Although in 2007 Iran agreed to compensate for the rising costs after the construction is finished, it is regarded that the possibility of the project turning a profit are remote. However, the project allowed the nuclear industry of Russia to preserve its expertise in times when funding was scarce, and until the sector started to receive orders from China and India.

According to Moscow Defense Brief, completion of the plant could become an indicator of Russia's credibility in large international high technology projects, and the successful integration of German and Russian technology could help the Russian nuclear industry in its ambitions to partner with foreign companies in building nuclear power plants in Russia and abroad.

Since Bushehr's nuclear reactor has been under construction by different firms and consultants, the constituent parts have also different origins. 24% of the parts are German in origin, 36% are Iranian-made while 40% are Russian-made.

Tehran and Moscow established a joint venture to operate Bushehr initially while Iran has developed operational experience. However, Iran will begin almost all operational control of the reactor within a few years.

A further two reactors of the same type are planned, and a preliminary agreement was made in 2014, though details have still to be agreed. The fourth unit was canceled, though further VVER units may be built elsewhere in Iran.

== Safety concerns ==
The Center for Energy and Security Studies, a Moscow-based independent think tank, explained the construction delays of the plant as partly due to a "shortage of skilled Russian engineering and construction specialists with suitable experience". It also spoke of "frequent problems with quality and deadlines". Aging equipment at the plant has also been a problem and, in February 2011, a 30-year-old German cooling pump broke, sending metal debris into the system. In 2010, the IAEA noted that the facility was understaffed.

Leaders from Gulf Cooperation Council (GCC) countries have expressed fears that a serious nuclear accident at the Bushehr plant would spread radiation throughout the region. Bushehr is closer to Persian Gulf capitals (Kuwait City, Manama, Doha, Abu Dhabi, and Muscat) than it is to Tehran. The government of Oman believes the plant presents no risk to Oman.

According to Kuwaiti geologist, Dr.Jassem al-Awadi, the plant is located at the junction of three tectonic plates. However the United States Geological Survey and NASA characterise the geology as near the boundary of two tectonic plates, the Arabian Plate and the Eurasian Plate. The plant is designed to withstand without serious damage a magnitude 8 earthquake, and survive up to magnitude 9.

In 2011 there were reports of safety concerns about the Bushehr plant, associated with construction of the plant itself, aging equipment at the plant, and understaffing.

A 2011 Natural Resources Defense Council report that evaluated the seismic hazard to reactors worldwide, as determined by the Global Seismic Hazard Assessment Program data, placed Busheher within the second group of 36 reactors within high seismic hazard areas, at lower risk than 12 reactors within very high seismic hazard areas in Japan and Taiwan.

Iran is one of the two countries in the world with significant nuclear activities not to ratify the 1994 Convention on Nuclear Safety, a system of peer review and mutual oversight, the other being Israel. It has been suggested that nuclear safety in Iran could benefit from Iran and Israel signing the convention.

In October 2012, the plant had to be shut down to limit damage after stray bolts were found beneath the fuel cells, contradicting Iran's earlier assurances that nothing unexpected had happened and that removing nuclear fuel from the plant was just routine.

Two diplomats claimed anonymously to press-agency AP, that earthquakes in April and May 2013 had caused a big crack in a wall of at least one of the buildings, the building that contains the reactor core however had no visible damage to it. Although spokesmen in Tehran argued earlier that the nuclear facility in Bushehr had suffered no damage during these earthquakes. The claims made by the anonymous diplomats have been rejected by Rosatom.

On 17 March 2026, the IAEA confirmed that a projectile struck the premises of the Bushehr plant. The incident occurred during ongoing U.S.–Israeli military strikes against Iranian infrastructure.

== Reactor data ==
Reactor unit	Reactor type	Net capacity	Gross capacity	Construction start	Electricity grid connection	Commercial operation	Shutdown
Bushehr-1	VVER-1000/446	1000 MW	1030 MW	1 May 1975; 1995	3 September 2011	23 September 2013	–
Bushehr-2	VVER-1000/528	1000 MW	1057 MW	27 September 2019			–
Bushehr-3		–					–
Bushehr-4					—		

== Demographics ==
=== Population ===
The residential area of the power plant is northeast of the plant's facilities and north of the village of Bandargah, in Howmeh Rural District of the Central District in Bushehr County at 28°50′17″N 50°54′09″E. In the 2006 National Census, the power plant's population was 3,341 in 921 households. The 2011 census counted 2,974 people in 910 households. The 2016 census measured the population of the power plant as 2,280 people in 764 households.

== See also ==
- Darkhovin Nuclear Power Plant
- Fordow Fuel Enrichment Plant
- IR-40
- Isfahan Nuclear Technology/Research Center
- Natanz Nuclear Facility
- Nuclear program of Iran
- Supreme Nuclear Committee of Iran

Regional:

- Barakah nuclear power plant, UAE
- Akkuyu Nuclear Power Plant, Türkiye
- El Dabaa Nuclear Power Plant, Egypt
