= Isfahan Nuclear Technology/Research Center =

Iranian atomic scientific center

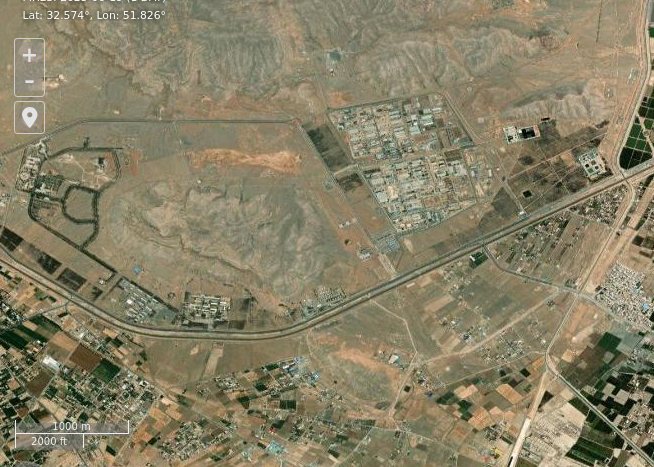
- Satellite imagery of the Isfahan Nuclear Technology/Research Center
- Country: Iran
- Location: Isfahan County, Isfahan province
- Coordinates: 32°34′26″N 51°49′34″E
- Owner: Government of Iran
- Operator: Atomic Energy Organization of Iran

External links
- Commons: Related media on Commons

The Isfahan Nuclear Technology/Research Center (مرکز بین‌المللی علوم و فنون هسته‌ای) is Iran's largest atomic scientific center, located south east of Isfahan city, central Isfahan County, and with 10MW capacity. Its front is Pishgam Energy Industries Corporation.

It is partly surveilled by UNO International Atomic Energy Agency under the Joint Comprehensive Plan of Action program.

Isfahan Nuclear District includes (mainly supplied by China):

- MNSR – 27 kW Miniature Neutron Source Reactor
- Light Water Subcritical Reactor (LWSCR)
- Heavy Water Zero Power Reactor (HWZPR)
- Graphite Subcritical Reactor (GSCR)

It was renamed from Uranium Conversion Facility (UCF).

== History ==
It was founded in 1970s with French assistance. The Isfahan Nuclear Technology facility was developed and opened in 1984 with Chinese aid. In the early 2000s, North Korea got approximately $25 million for giving Iran tunneling technology, which was widely employed at the underground nuclear site.

=== 2025 Israeli and American airstrikes ===
On 13 June 2025, Israel launched airstrikes at the nuclear facility, damaging or destroying the Uranium Conversion facility as well as damaging the Fuel Plate Fabrication Plant and a fourth critical building.

On 22 June 2025, the United States Air Force executed airstrikes in Iran's nuclear facilities, including the Isfahan Nuclear Technology/Research Center.

On 6 August 2025, the Center for Strategic and International Studies confirmed that satellite imagery taken on July 22, 2025, showed that the facility suffered "extensive damage" in the June 2025 airstrikes. Even by the time the images were taken, "limited activity" was taking place at the complex, with Iran making "some efforts" to clear out roads and stabilize "some structures."

== See also ==
- Bushehr Nuclear Power Plant
- Darkhovin Nuclear Power Plant
- Fordow Fuel Enrichment Plant
- List of power stations in Iran
- Natanz Nuclear Facility
- Nuclear program of Iran
- Supreme Nuclear Committee of Iran
