= Fordow Uranium Enrichment Plant =

Uranium enrichment facility in Iran

- Shahid Ali Mohammadi Nuclear Facility
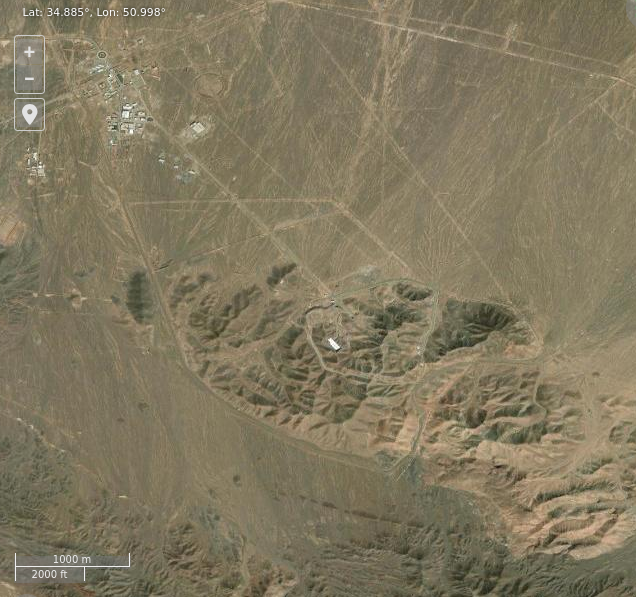
- Satellite image of Fordow Uranium Enrichment Plant prior to the American airstrike

Location
- Location within Iran
- Coordinates: 34.8845°N 50.9981°E

Site history
- Built: 2006
- Events: 2025 US strikes on Iranian nuclear sites

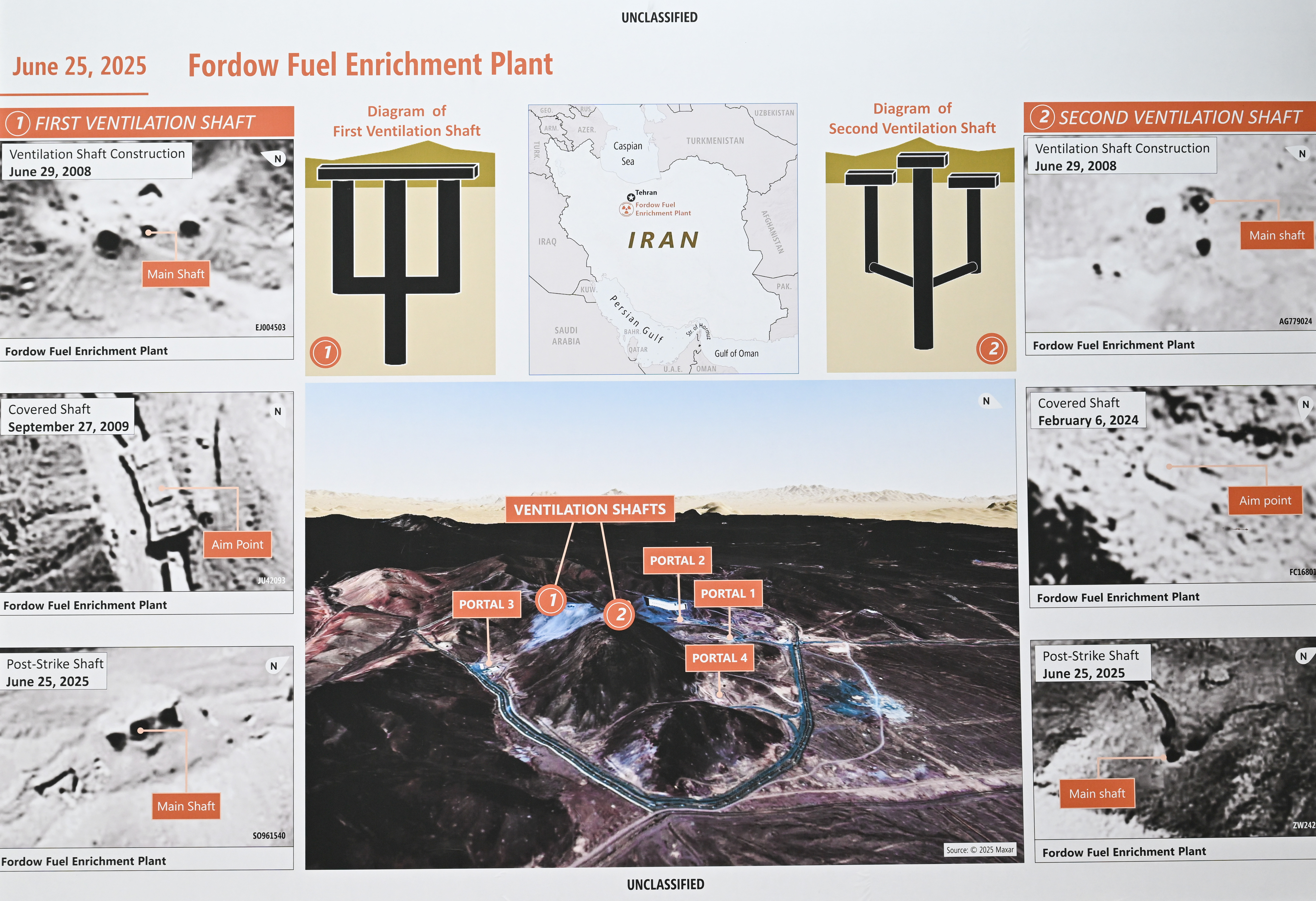
Fordow Uranium (Fuel) Enrichment Plant exhibit at the Department of Defense press briefing at the Pentagon on 26 June 2025

The Fordow Uranium Enrichment Plant, officially the Shahid Ali Mohammadi Nuclear Facility (Persian: تأسیسات هسته‌ای شهید علی‌محمدی), is an Iranian underground uranium enrichment facility located 30 kilometres (20 mi) north of the Iranian city of Qom, at a former Islamic Revolutionary Guard Corps base. The site is under the control of the Atomic Energy Organization of Iran (AEOI). It is the second Iranian uranium enrichment facility, the other being the Natanz Nuclear Facility.

Under the Joint Comprehensive Plan of Action effective January 2016, Fordow was to cease uranium enrichment for 15 years, and carry out civilian research and production.

During the 2025 Twelve-Day War, Iran reported Israeli attacks on the site on 13 and 16 June. On 22 June the United States bombed Fordow and other nuclear sites, with six B-2 Spirits dropping twelve heavy bunker busters. The UN nuclear chief claiming damage was likely "very significant" but could not be verified. However, the International Atomic Energy Agency (IAEA) chief could confirm that Fordow had indeed sustained significant damage in this strike. Two scientists who are members of the Institute for Science and International Security noted that a penetration hole found about the facility's enrichment hall on satellite images indicated that the facility was now "likely destroyed and knocked out of operation."

== History ==
Construction on the facility started in 2006, but the existence of the enrichment plant was only disclosed to the International Atomic Energy Agency (IAEA) by Iran on 21 September 2009, after the site became known to Western intelligence services. Western officials strongly condemned Iran for not disclosing the site earlier; U.S. president Barack Obama said that Fordow had been under U.S. surveillance. Iran argues that this disclosure was consistent with its legal obligations under its Safeguards Agreement with the IAEA, which Iran claims requires Iran to declare new facilities 180 days before they receive nuclear material. The IAEA stated that Iran was bound by its agreement in 2003 to declare the facility as soon as Iran decided to construct it.

Iranian authorities state the facility is built deep in a mountain because of repeated threats by Israel to attack such facilities, which Israel believes can be used to produce nuclear weapons. Attacking a nuclear facility so close to the city of Qom, which is considered holy among Shia Muslims, raises concerns about a potential Shia religious response.

In November 2013, hundreds of Iranians, mostly students of Sharif University of Technology, accompanied by the head of AEOI, Ali Akbar Salehi, and several Majles (parliament) representatives formed a human chain around the Fordow uranium enrichment facility. The students were there to show their support for the Iranian nuclear program.

Under the 2015 Joint Comprehensive Plan of Action, Fordow was to stop researching and enriching uranium for at least 15 years. The facility was to be converted into a nuclear physics and technology center. For 15 years, Fordow would maintain no more than 1,044 IR-1 centrifuges in six cascades in one wing. Two of the six cascades would be transitioned for stable isotope production for medical, agricultural, industrial, and scientific use. The other four would remain idle. Iran agreed to keep no fissile material there.

In 2016, Iran stationed anti-aircraft S-300 missile systems at the site.

The uranium enrichment infrastructure at Fordow was attacked by Stuxnet and related cyberweapons.

On 1 February 2023, the IAEA "criticised Iran ... for making an undeclared change to the interconnection between the two clusters of advanced machines enriching uranium to up to 60% purity, close to weapons grade, at its Fordow plant."

=== 2025 Israeli and American airstrikes ===
On 13 June 2025, Israel attacked the plant as part of the June 2025 Israeli strikes on Iran. Iranian forces said they had shot down an Israeli drone. The extent of the damage was unclear because Fordow nuclear facility, like the Natanz facility, is buried deep underground. Satellite imagery and reports suggested that some above-ground sites at Fordow and Natanz were damaged, but the subterranean facilities that house centrifuges and enriched uranium were not breached. On 14 June 2025, the Atomic Energy Organization of Iran stated that there had been limited damage to the site as a result of the strikes.

Following the Israeli strike, the US was said to be considering striking the site, which would require the use of the GBU-57A/B MOP. On 21 June 2025, American president Donald Trump announced that U.S. B-2 bombers had also struck the nuclear facility in Fordow as well as those in Natanz and Isfahan. In an address from the White House, Trump claimed "Iran's key nuclear enrichment facilities have been completely and totally obliterated," though later reporting indicated that Fordow (but not the other two enrichment facilities) was "mostly destroyed."

On 24 June The New York Times and CNN reported that a preliminary battle damage assessment by the Defense Intelligence Agency had concluded with low confidence that the U.S. strikes had set back Iran's nuclear program by a matter of months. The same day, however, Institute for Science and International Security analysts David Albright and Spencer Faragrasso were able to confirm that facility's enrichment hall had been successfully penetrated, and likely took Fordow out of operation, noting that following the U.S. airstrikes on Fordow, satellite imagery showed "at least one penetration hole located above the buried enrichment hall caused by a GBU-57 bunker buster. It is reported by the U.S. Department of Defense that at least two GBU-57’s (MOP) attacked the site, possibly in an attack where one followed the other through the same penetration hole in a “double tap” strike. As a result, the site is likely destroyed and knocked out of operation. No damage was observed in satellite imagery of the complex being constructed underneath Mt. Kolang Gaz La." On 25 June, Trump stated that people sent by Israel confirmed the destruction of the site. Following a classified Senate briefing on June 26th Senator Tom Cotton, who leads the Senate Intelligence Committee, was more definitive. He said the strikes would "protect the world from the risk of an Iranian nuclear weapon for years."

On 1 July, Iran built a new access road and deployed equipment to the site following last, according to The Wall Street Journal. However, analysts from the Institute for Science and International Security believed Iran was preparing for downhole inspections to assess damage.

On 2 July, Iran's foreign minister Abbas Araghchi said in an interview with CBS that "No one exactly knows what has transpired in Fordow. That being said, what we know so far is that the facilities have been seriously and heavily damaged".

On 22 July, Araghchi said in an interview with Fox News that the American strikes had "destroyed" Iran's nuclear facilities, but insisted that the country would continue to pursue uranium enrichment as a matter of national pride.

On 26 September, commenting to Reuters for the first time about the US attack on Fordow, IAEA chief Rafael Grossi confirmed that "almost all sensitive equipment" at the site had been destroyed. However, he also stated that if Iran chose to further enrich their existing stockpile of uranium to 90 percent, it would only take them a few weeks to complete the process.

== Capacity ==
In its initial declaration, Iran stated that the purpose of the facility was the production of uranium hexafluoride (UF_{6}) enriched up to 5% U-235, and that the facility was being built to contain 16 cascades, with a total of approximately 3,000 centrifuges. In September 2011, Iran said it would move its production of 20% low enriched uranium (LEU) to Fordow from Natanz.

In December 2011, enrichment started. In January 2012, the IAEA announced that Iran had started producing uranium enriched up to 20% for medical purposes and that material "remains under the agency's containment and surveillance."

Under the Joint Comprehensive Plan of Action of April 2015, the Fordow plant was to be restructured to less intensive research use. The Fordow facility was to stop enriching uranium and researching uranium enrichment for at least 15 years, and the facility was to be converted into a nuclear physics and technology centre. For 15 years, it would maintain no more than 1,044 IR-1 centrifuges in six cascades in one wing of Fordow. "Two of those six cascades will spin without uranium and will be transitioned, including through appropriate infrastructure modification," for stable radioisotope production for medical, agricultural, industrial, and scientific use. "The other four cascades with all associated infrastructure will remain idle." Iran is not permitted to have any fissile material in Fordow.

Under the terms of the nuclear agreement with Iran, two-thirds of the centrifuges inside Fordo have been removed in recent months, along with all nuclear material. The facility is banned from any nuclear-related work and is being converted to other uses, eliminating the threat that prompted the attack plan, at least for the next 15 years.

— David E. Sanger and Mark Mazzetti, 16 February 2016, The New York Times

The United States withdrew from the pact in May 2018, imposing sanctions under its maximum pressure campaign. The sanctions applied to all countries and companies doing business with Iran and cut it off from the international financial system, rendering the nuclear deal's economic provisions null.

In October 2019, the Israeli company ImageSat published satellite photographs showing renewed construction and development at the Fordow facility.

In November 2019, Iranian nuclear chief Ali Akbar Salehi announced that Iran would enrich uranium to 5% at Fordow.

By January 2020, the Fordow site had 1,044 centrifuges.

In January 2021, the Fordow site began to produce uranium enriched to a 20% level.

In March 2023, CNN reported that "near bomb-grade" uranium had been found at Fordow. The IAEA confirmed that 83.7% pure U-235 was discovered at Fordow, and that this had been a significant surprise to the agency.

In June 2024, the IAEA remarked that Iran had built additional centrifuges, while The Washington Post remarked on the Iranian order to triple the centrifuge capacity of the Fordow plant. The Times of Israel said that four new cascades had been installed but had not yet been commissioned.

== See also ==
- Bushehr Nuclear Power Plant
- Darkhovin Nuclear Power Plant
- IR-40
- Isfahan Nuclear Technology/Research Center
- Natanz Nuclear Facility
- Nuclear program of Iran
- Supreme Nuclear Committee of Iran
