= Schumer =

Schumer is a surname. Notable people with the surname include:

- Amy Schumer (born 1981), American comedian and actress
- Chuck Schumer (born 1950), American senator and Democratic politician
- Fern Schumer Chapman, American author

== See also ==
- Schumer box, the summary of the costs of a credit card, named after Chuck Schumer
