= Supreme Nuclear Committee of Iran =

Committee on Iran's Nuclear Program

Supreme Nuclear Committee of Iran (Persian: کمیته عالی هسته‌ای ایران) is a committee in Iran whose main task is to guide and create greater coordination on the Nuclear program of Iran. This committee officially began its work with a notification on 10 June 2003. Its weekly meetings were held at the secretariat of the Supreme National Security Council.

== Members ==
The initial members of this committee, who were selected by the Supreme Leader and the President, were:

* Gholam Reza Aghazadeh (former head of the Atomic Energy Organization)
* Kamal Kharazi (former minister of foreign affairs)
* Mohammad Khatami (president at the time)
* Ali Larijani (former speaker of the Islamic Consultative Assembly)
* Ali Shamkhani (secretary of the Supreme National Security Council)
* Ali Hosseini Tash (strategic deputy of the Supreme National Security Council)
* Ali Akbar Velayati (international advisor to the leader)
* Ali Younesi (former minister of intelligence)

== See also ==
- Israel and the nuclear program of Iran
- Natanz Nuclear Facility
- List of Iranian nuclear negotiators
- Timeline of the nuclear program of Iran
