= Negotiations leading to the Iran nuclear deal =

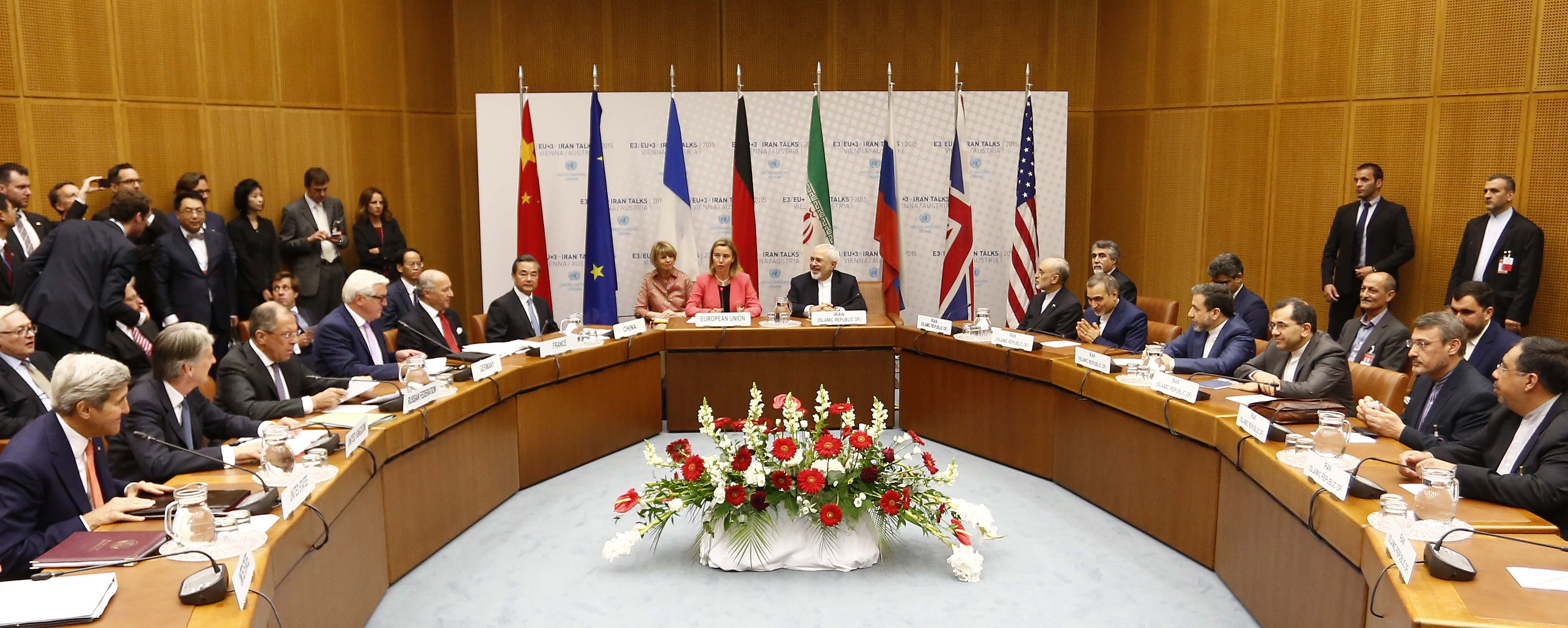
The ministers of foreign affairs of China, France, Germany, Russia, the United Kingdom, the United States and the European Union debate with Iran nuclear negotiating team, 14 July 2015.

The negotiations leading to the Iran nuclear deal were talks between Iran and the P5+1 that resulted in the Joint Comprehensive Plan of Action (Persian: برنامه جامع اقدام مشترک), signed in Vienna on 14 July 2015. The P5+1 consisted of the five permanent members of the United Nations Security Council: China, France, Russia, United Kingdom and the United States, plus Germany and the European Union. The agreement is a comprehensive agreement on the nuclear program of Iran.

The agreement is based on the 24 November 2013 Geneva interim framework agreement, officially titled the Joint Plan of Action (JPA). The Geneva agreement was an interim deal, in which Iran agreed to roll back parts of its nuclear program in exchange for relief from some sanctions and that went into effect on 20 January 2014. The parties agreed to extend their talks with a first extension deadline on 24 November 2014 and a second extension deadline set to 1 July 2015.

Based on the March/April 2015 negotiations on the Iran nuclear deal framework, completed on 2 April 2015, Iran agreed tentatively to accept significant restrictions on its nuclear program, all of which would last for at least a decade and some longer, and to submit to an increased intensity of international inspections under a framework deal. These details were to be negotiated by the end of June 2015. On 30 June the negotiations on a Joint Comprehensive Plan of Action were extended under the Joint Plan of Action until 7 July 2015. The agreement was signed in Vienna on 14 July 2015.

== List of declared nuclear facilities in Iran ==
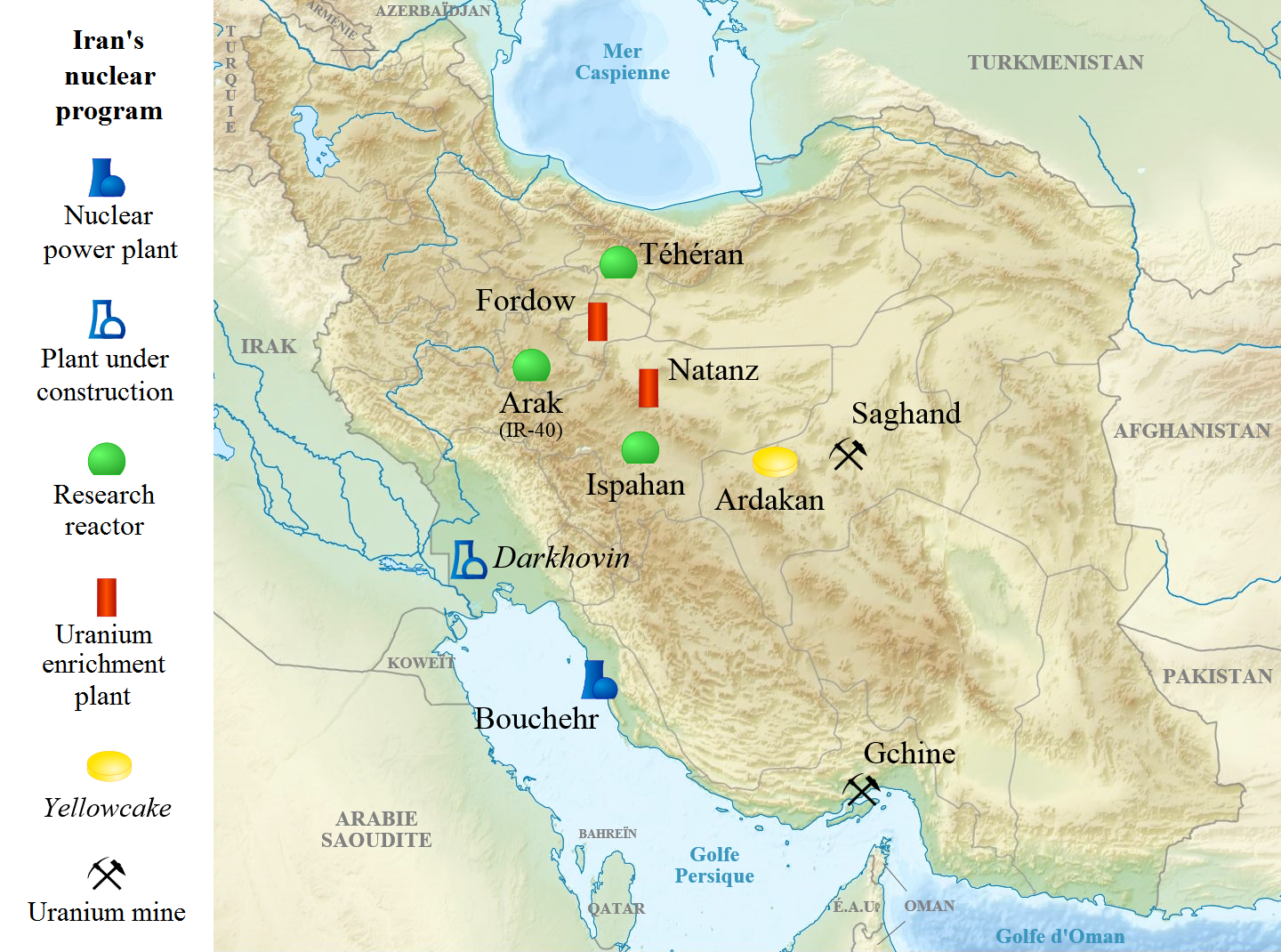
Main sites of Iran's nuclear program

The following is a partial list of nuclear facilities in Iran (IAEA, NTI and other sources):

- Tehran Research Reactor (TRR) — small 5MWt research reactor
- Esfahan, Uranium Conversion Facility (UCF)
- Natanz, Fuel Enrichment Plant (FEP) — plant for production of low enriched uranium (LEU), 16,428 installed centrifuges
- Natanz, Pilot Fuel Enrichment Plant (PFEP) — LEU production, and research and development facility, 702 installed centrifuges
- Fordow Fuel Enrichment Plant (FFEP) — plant for production of UF_{6} enriched up to 20% U-235, 2,710 installed centrifuges
- Arak, Iran Nuclear Research Reactor (IR-40 Reactor) — 40MWt heavy water reactor (under construction, no electrical output)
- Bushehr Nuclear Power Plant (BNPP)

== Background ==
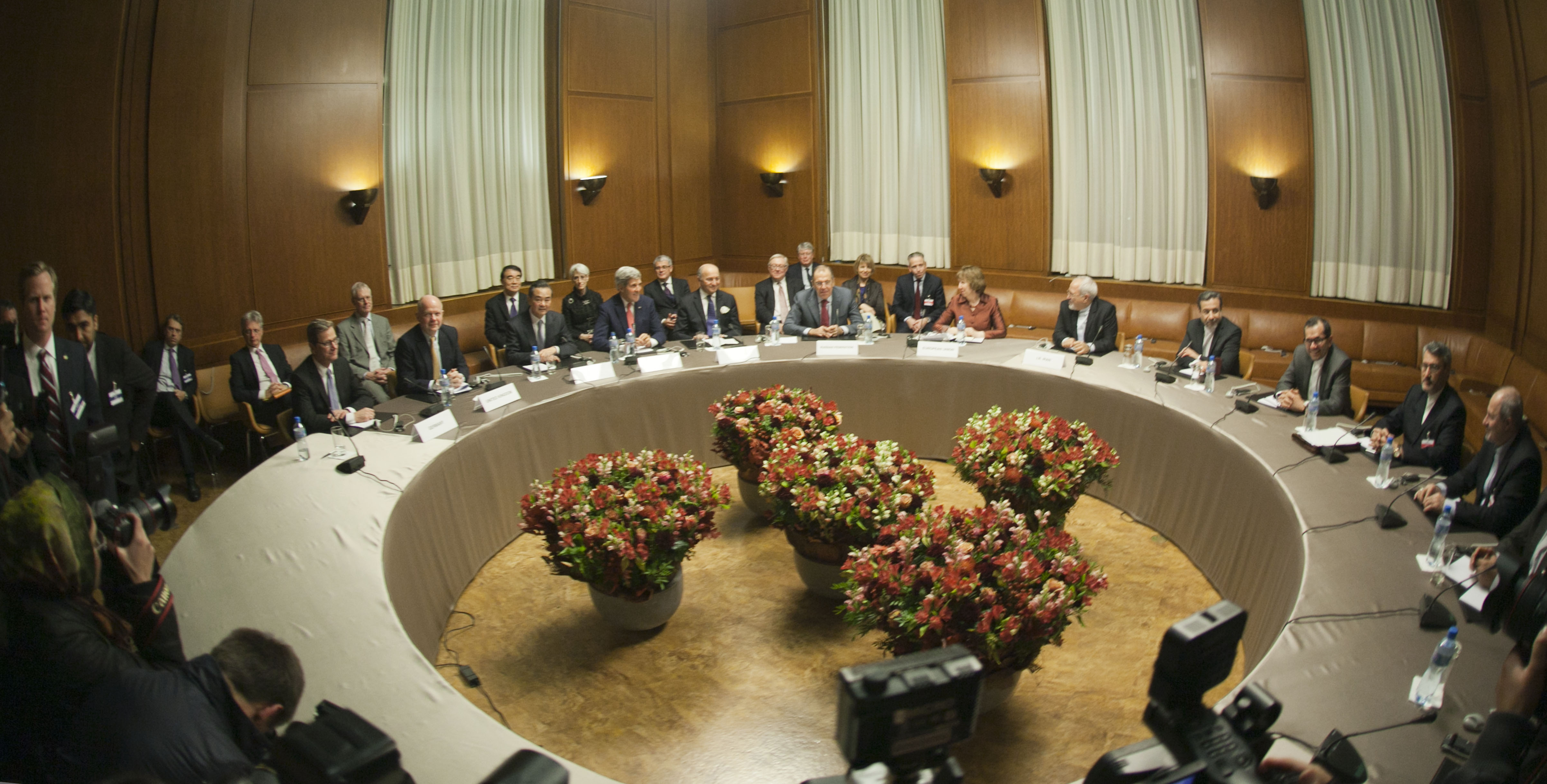
P5+1 and Iranian negotiators meet along with E.U. High Representative Catherine Ashton in Geneva

Negotiations between Iran and the P5+1 began in 2006, to assure the P5+1 world powers that Iran would not develop nuclear weapons, and to assure Iran that its right to enrich nuclear fuel for civilian purposes under the third pillar of the Treaty on the Non-Proliferation of Nuclear Weapons, to which it is a party, was respected. During the period of negotiation, the United States, the European Union and others imposed some sanctions on Iran, which have been referred to by President Hassan Rouhani as a crime against humanity.

The broad outlines of a deal seem to have been clear for some time. The 2013 Presidential election of Iran led to the Presidency of Rouhani, who is described by the western media as a political moderate.

After several rounds of negotiations, on 24 November 2013, the Geneva interim agreement, officially titled the Joint Plan of Action, was signed between Iran and the P5+1 countries in Geneva, Switzerland. It consists of a short-term freeze of portions of Iran's nuclear program in exchange for decreased economic sanctions on Iran, as the countries work towards a long-term agreement. Implementation of the agreement began 20 January 2014.

== Negotiations ==
=== Negotiations under the Joint Plan of Action ===
First round
18–20 February 2014, Vienna

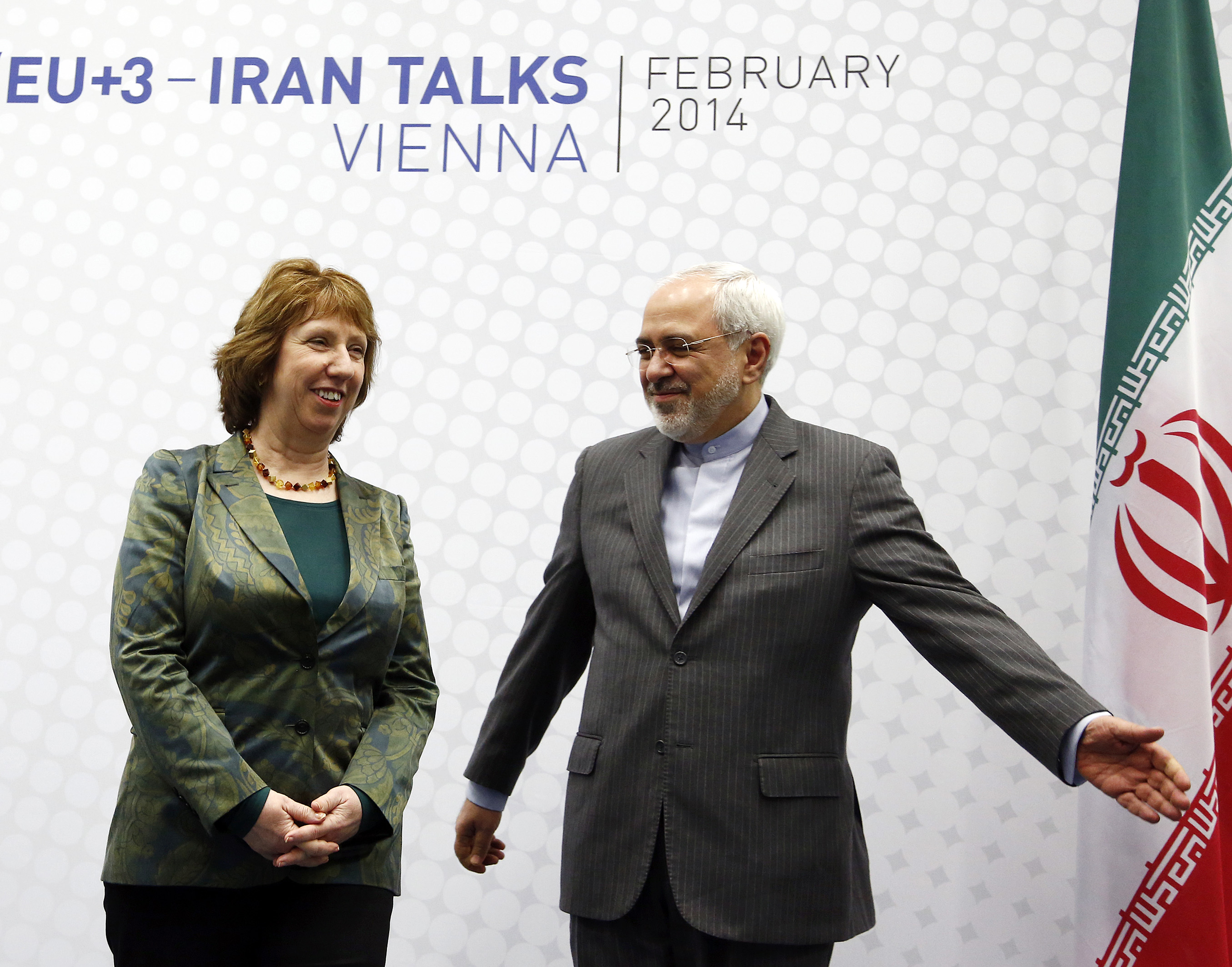
Catherine Ashton and Javad Zarif in final news conference; The negotiation was described as "useful".

The first round of negotiations was held at the UN's center in Vienna from 18 to 20 February 2014. A timetable and framework for negotiating a comprehensive agreement was achieved, according to Catherine Ashton and Iran's Foreign Minister Mohammad Javad Zarif.

Second round
17–20 March 2014, Vienna

Diplomats from the six nations, Ashton, and Zarif met again in Vienna on 17 March 2014. A series of further negotiations were to be held before the July deadline.

Third round
7–9 April 2014, Vienna

"World powers and Iran have agreed to hold a new round of nuclear talks in Vienna on April 7–9 after two days of "substantive" discussions in Vienna on Tehran's contested work, European Union foreign policy chief Catherine Ashton said on Wednesday."

Fourth round
13–16 May 2014, Vienna

This fourth round of Vienna negotiations ended on 16 May 2014. The Iranian and U.S. delegations headed by Iranian Foreign Minister Mohammad Javad Zarif and U.S. Under Secretary of State for Political Affairs Wendy Sherman held a bilateral meeting. Both sides intended to begin drafting a final agreement, but made little progress. A senior U.S. official said "We are just at the beginning of the drafting process and we have a significant way to go," while Iranian Deputy Foreign Minister Abbas Araqchi told reporters that "the talks were serious and constructive but no progress has been made" and "we have not reached the point to start drafting the final agreement." The U.S. official emphasized that negotiations had been "very slow and difficult," saying talks would resume in June and all parties want to keep the 20 July deadline and adding: "we believe we can still get it done." Negotiators had made progress on one issue, the future of Iran's planned Arak reactor, but remained far apart on whether Iran's capacity to enrich uranium should shrink or expand. The U.S. delegation also raised the issues of Iran's ballistic missile program and military dimensions of its past nuclear research. EU High Representative Catherine Ashton conducted negotiations with Zarif and Wendy Sherman joined the talks at the end the last meeting.

Fifth round
16–20 June 2014, Vienna

The fifth round of talks ended on 20 June 2014, "with substantial differences still remaining." The negotiating parties will meet again in Vienna on 2 July. Under Secretary Sherman noted after the talks that it was "still unclear" whether Iran would act "to ensure the world that its nuclear program was strictly meant for peaceful purposes." Foreign Minister Zarif said the United States was making unreasonable demands of Iran, saying "the United States must take the most difficult decisions."

Under the Geneva interim agreement Iran agreed to convert some of its up to 5 percent LEU into an oxide powder that is not suitable for further enrichment. According to the monthly IAEA report released during this round the conversion of LEU has not been started yet. This means that Iran's LEU stockpile "is almost certainly continuing to increase for the time being, simply because its production of the material has not stopped, unlike that of the 20 percent uranium gas."

Sixth (final) round
2–20 July 2014, Vienna

The sixth round of nuclear negotiations between Iran and the P5+1 group started in Vienna on 2 July 2014. The parties are headed by Iran's Foreign Minister Mohammad Javad Zarif and the EU's foreign policy chief Catherine Ashton.

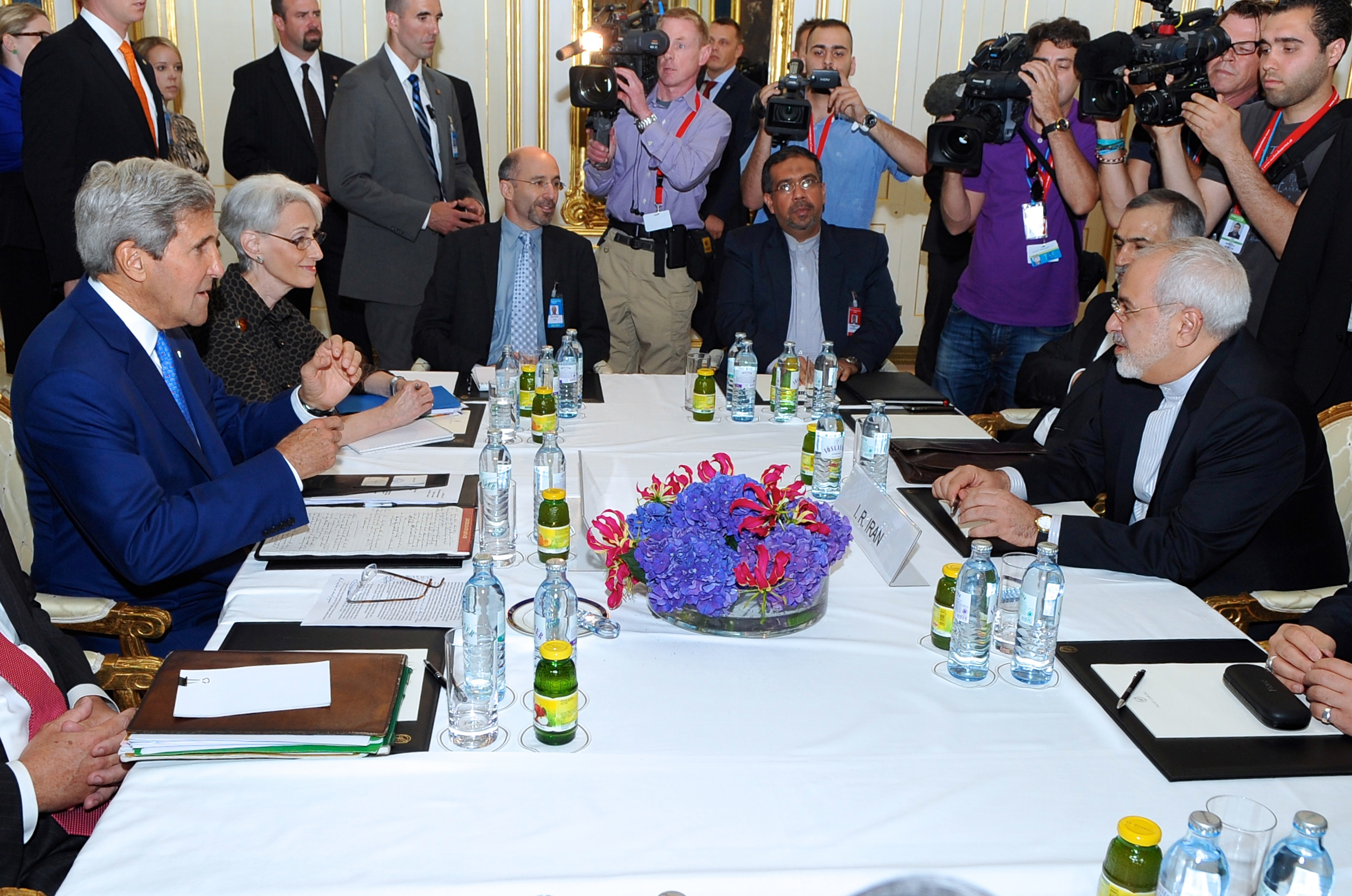
John Kerry and Mohammad Javad Zarif conduct a bilateral meeting in Vienna, Austria, 14 July 2014

U.S. Secretary of State John Kerry and other Western foreign ministers arrived at Vienna to break a deadlock in the nuclear talks with Iran, but their joint efforts failed to advance the negotiations. "There has been no breakthrough today," said British Foreign Secretary William Hague on 13 July 2014 after meetings with the foreign ministers of the United States, France, Germany and Iran. German foreign minister Frank-Walter Steinmeier said: "It is now time for Iran to decide whether they want co-operation with the world community or stay in isolation." The European foreign ministers left Vienna the same day. The Iranian Foreign Minister Javad Zarif said that the talks had "made some important headway." After three days of talks with the Iranian Foreign Minister Secretary of State Kerry headed back to Washington where he will consult with President Barack Obama and Congress leaders. No decision on an extension of negotiations beyond the 20 July deadline has been taken yet. In order to continue talks a decision of each member of P5+1 is required.

Wrapping-up the sixth round the Foreign Minister Zarif said that the achieved progress convinced the sides to extend their talks and the ultimate deadline would be 25 November. He also expressed the hope that the new British foreign secretary Philip Hammond "will adopt a constructive diplomacy" towards Iran. Several sources reported that all parties were prepared to extend negotiations but extension faced opposition in the United States Congress. Republicans and Democrats in Congress made it clear that they view a prolongation of the talks as allowing Iran to play for time. The Republican chairman of the United States House Committee on Foreign Affairs Ed Royce said he hoped "the administration will finally engage in robust discussions with Congress about preparing additional sanctions against Iran".

Before the expiration of the six months imposed by the Joint Plan of Action (JPA) the sides agreed to extend negotiations by four months with a final deadline set for 24 November 2014. Additionally, in exchange for Iranian consent to convert some of its 20% enriched uranium into fuel for a research reactor, United States will unblock $2.8 billion in frozen Iranian funds. Negotiations will resume in September. John Kerry said that tangible progress had been made, but "very real gaps" remained. Ed Royce stated that he did not see "the extension as progress".

Under Secretary of State Wendy Sherman has testified before the U. S. Senate Foreign Relations Committee on the status of the talks. At her testimony on 29 July 2014 she said: "We made tangible progress in key areas, including Fordow, Arak, and IAEA access. However, critical gaps still exist...." Republicans and Democrats have insisted that a final agreement be put to a vote.

=== Negotiations under the First Extension of JPA ===
7th (first extended) round
19 September 2014, New York

Negotiations between the P5+1 and Iran over Iran's nuclear program were resumed on 19 September 2014. They started on the sidelines of the United Nations General Assembly and Secretary of State John Kerry and his counterparts were given the opportunity to join the talks. The talks were planned to last until 26 September.

8th round
16 October 2014, Vienna

Negotiating teams of Iran and the P5+1 held their 8th round of talks in Vienna on 16 October 2014. The meeting was led jointly by Foreign Minister Zarif and High Representative Ashton and the parties made an effort to sort out their differences. Ashton's spokesman stated: "Diplomatic efforts to find a resolution to the Iranian nuclear issue are now in a critical phase".

Russian Deputy Foreign Minister Sergei Ryabkov pointed that the issues of Iran's enrichment programme, the schedule for sanction lifting and the future of the reactor in Arak were not settled and the subjects of inspection and transparency, duration of the agreement and some others were not completely agreed yet. Ryabkov expressed his opinion that a comprehensive agreement between the P5+1 and Iran will require no ratification. "We are negotiating a binding document, but under a generally recognized doctrine international political liabilities are equated with legal," he said and admitted that some resolutions of the Security Council on Iran will need to be adjusted.

9th round
11 November 2014 Muscat

The round of talks took place on 11 November in the Omani capital Muscat and lasted one hour. At the meeting, Iranian deputy foreign ministers Abbas Araqchi and Majid Takht Ravanchi exchanged views with their counterparts from the P5+1. The round, chaired by former EU foreign policy chief Catherine Ashton, was scheduled to brief the P5+1 members on Kerry and Zarif's talks. Local media reported that some representatives of the parties remained in Muscat to continue the talks.

10th round
18–24 November 2014, Vienna

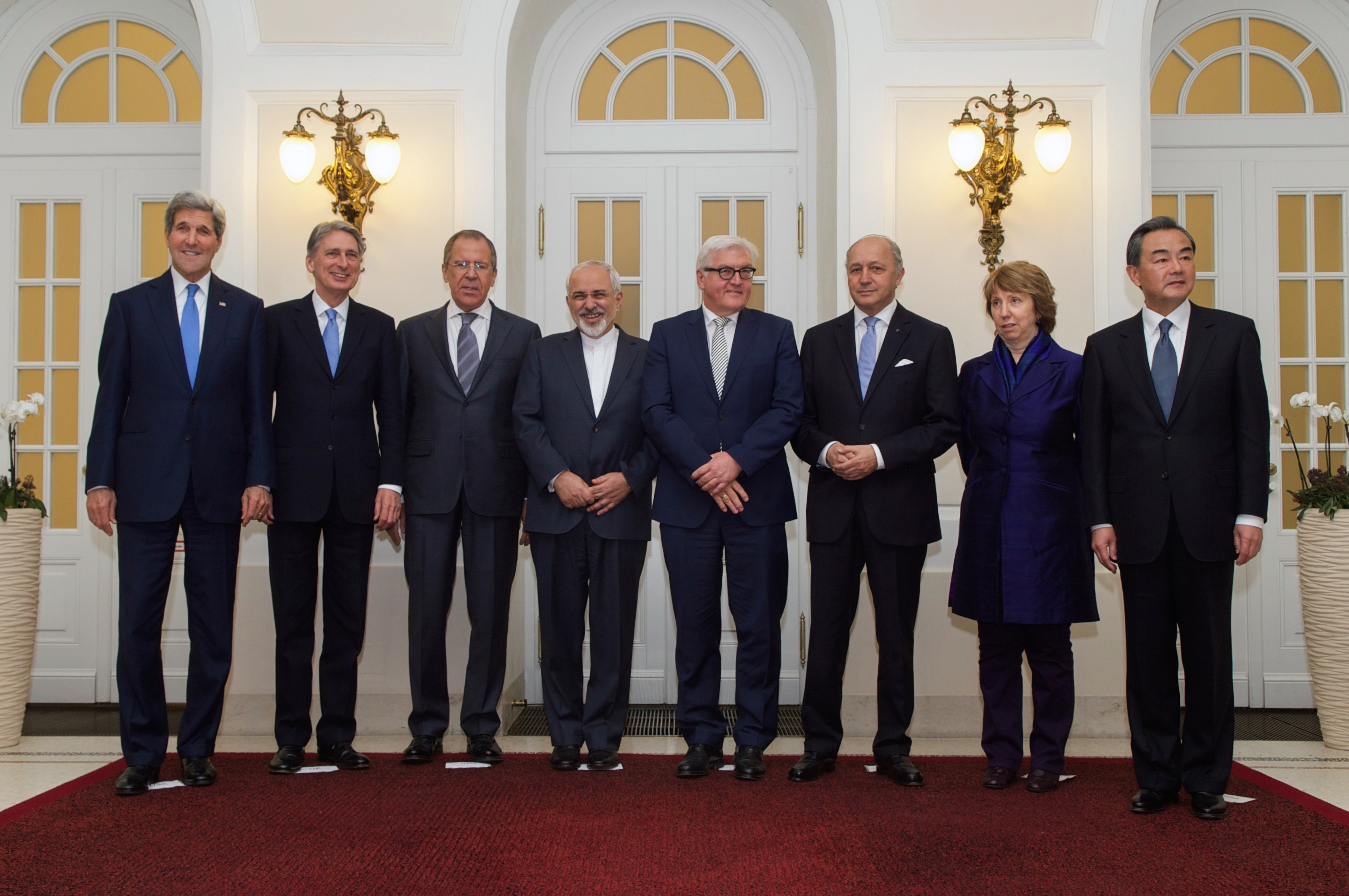
P5+1 Ministers and Iranian Foreign Minister Zarif in Vienna, Austria, 24 November 2014.

Negotiations resumed in Vienna on 18 November 2014 with participation of Iranian Foreign Minister Mohammad Zarif, EU chief negotiator Catherine Ashton, and foreign ministry officials. The talks were supposed to continue until the 24 November 2014 deadline.

Secretary of State John Kerry, after meeting British and Omani foreign ministers in London and Saudi and French foreign ministers in Paris, was to arrive in Vienna for talks with Zarif and Ashton. Kerry's meetings with French Foreign Minister Laurent Fabius and Saudi Foreign Minister Saud al-Faisal were considered critical. After his Paris talks with Kerry Saudi Foreign Minister was due to meet Russian Foreign Minister Sergey Lavrov in Moscow.

At an IAEA meeting held on 20 November in Vienna the agency's Director General Yukiya Amano, referring to allegations related to Iran's engagement in weaponization activities, said that "Iran has not provided any explanations that enable the agency to clarify the outstanding practical measures." The same day at a press conference in Brussels the International Committee in Search of Justice (ISJ) presented its 100-page investigation report and claimed that Iran was hiding its nuclear military program inside a civil program. The report was endorsed by John Bolton and Robert Joseph and authored by ISJ President Alejo Vidal‐Quadras, a professor in nuclear physics and the former Vice-President of the European Parliament.

The 10th round of nuclear negotiations and the 1st extension of the Joint Plan of Action ended on 24 November, failing to reach agreement. They agreed to extend the Joint Plan of Action for the second time with a new deadline for a comprehensive deal set to 1 July 2015. British foreign secretary Philip Hammond said it was not possible to meet the November deadline due to wide gaps on well-known points of contention. He stressed that while 1 July was the new deadline, the expectation was that broad agreement would be in place by 1 March 2015, that expert level talks would resume in December 2014 and that Iran would receive about $700 million per month in frozen assets. In reply to a question about "fundamental gaps over how much enrichment capacity Iran would be allowed to retain", Secretary of State John Kerry said in a news conference on 24 November 2014: "I'm not going to confirm whether or not there's a gap or not a gap or where the gaps are. There obviously are gaps. We've said that." Iran's Foreign Minister Mohammad Javad Zarif said in a press conference on 25 November 2014: "Today the Iranian nuclear program is internationally recognized and no one speaks about our enrichment right..."

=== Negotiations under the Second Extension of JPA ===
11th round
17 December 2014, Geneva

Negotiations between Iran and the P5+1 resumed on 17 December 2014 in Geneva and lasted one day. No statements were issued after the closed-door talks either by the U.S. negotiating team or by EU spokesmen. Deputy foreign minister Araqchi said that it was agreed to continue the talks "next month" at a venue to be decided. Russian Deputy Foreign Minister Ryabkov said that Arak heavy-water reactor and sanctions against Iran were the two key outstanding issues in the nuclear talks.

12th round
18 January 2015, Geneva

The round, held at the level of political directors of Iran and the P5+1, took place on 18 January 2015 following the four-day bilateral talks between the United States and Iran. EU political director Helga Schmid chaired the meetings. After the talks France's negotiator Nicolas de la Riviere told reporters: "The mood was very good, but I don't think we made a lot of progress." Russian negotiator Sergei Ryabkov told journalists, "If there is progress it is a very slow one and there are no guarantees that this progress will transform into a decisive shift, breakthrough, into a compromise," adding that "major disagreements remain on the majority of disputed issues."

13th round
22 February 2015, Geneva

Representatives of Iran and the P5+1 met on 22 February 2015 at the EU mission in Geneva. Nicolas de la Riviere said after the meeting: "It was constructive, we will know results later."

=== Negotiations on Iran nuclear deal framework, 26 March to 2 April 2015, Lausanne ===
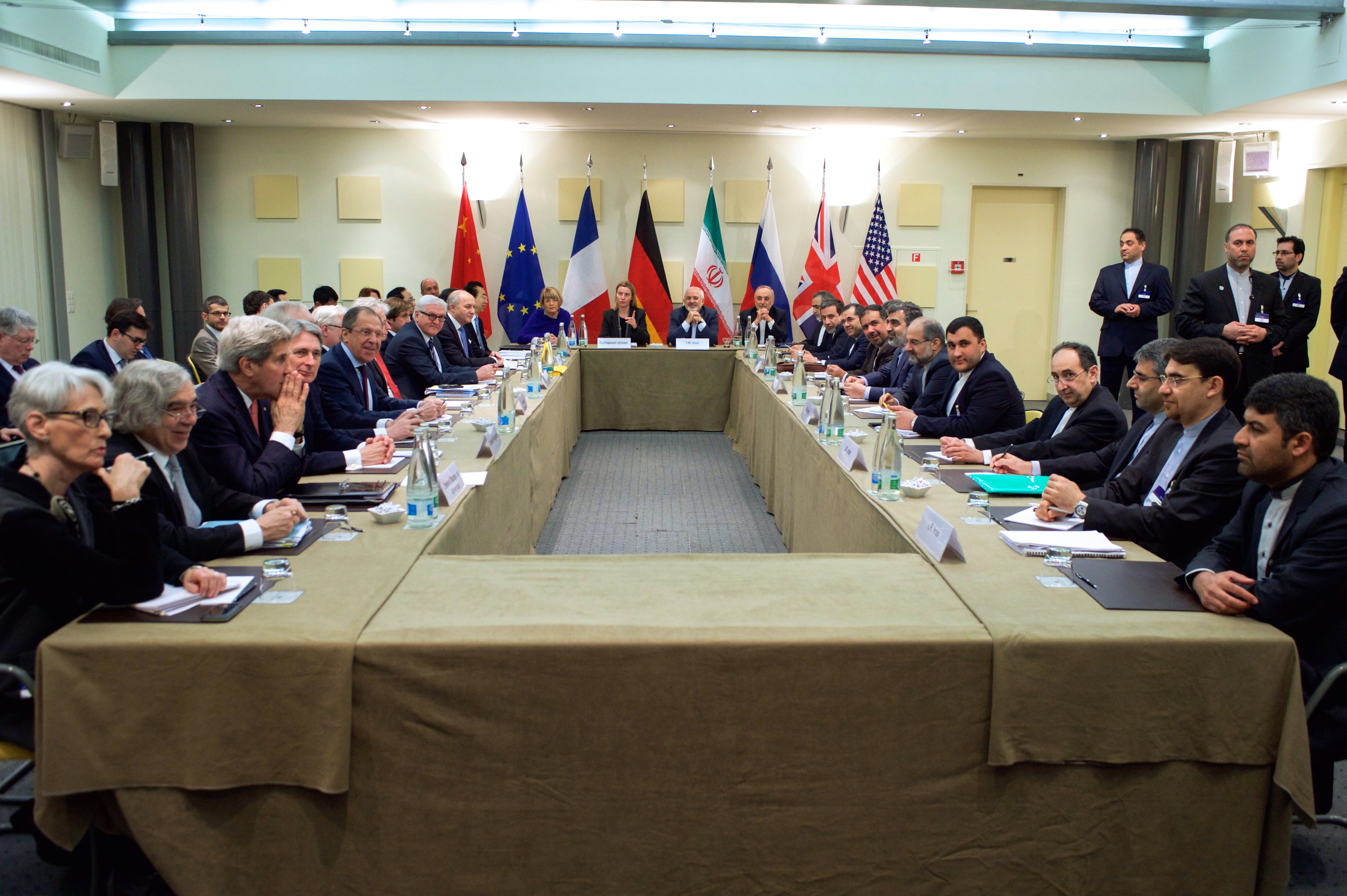
The ministers of foreign affairs of the United States, the United Kingdom, Russia, Germany, France, China, the European Union and Iran (Lausanne, 30 March 2015).

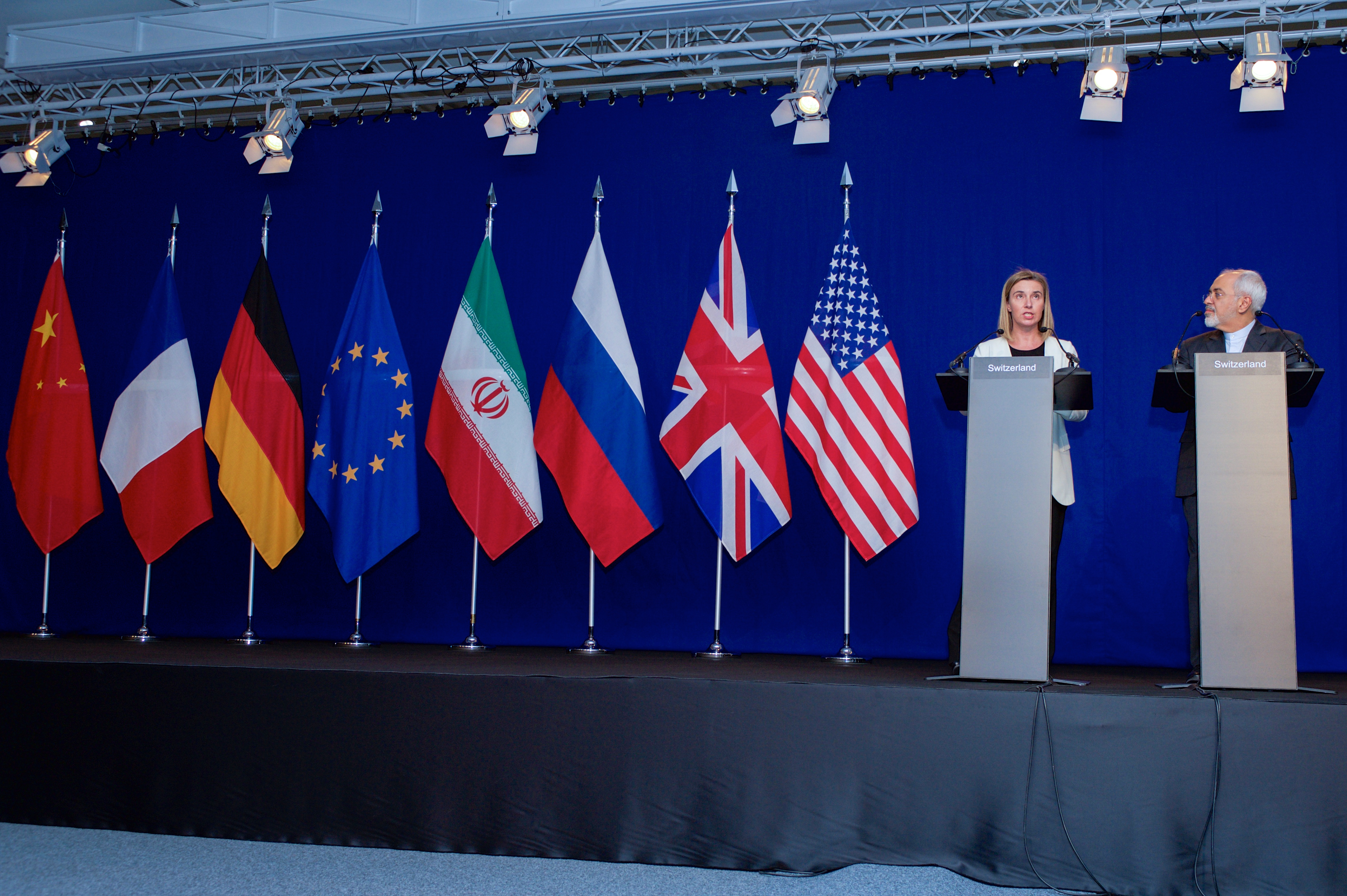
Federica Mogherini (High Representative of the European Union for Foreign Affairs) and Mohammad Javad Zarif (Minister of Foreign Affairs of Iran) presenting the framework agreement, following the multilateral negotiations in Lausanne (2 April 2015).

Negotiations for an Iran nuclear deal framework were a series of intensive talks from 26 March to 2 April 2015 in Lausanne, between the foreign ministers of the United States, the United Kingdom, Russia, Germany, France, China, the European Union and Islamic Republic of Iran. On 2 April the talks ended and a joint press conference was held by Federica Mogherini (High Representative of the Union for Foreign Affairs) and Mohammad Javad Zarif (Minister of Foreign Affairs of Iran) to announce that the eight nations had reached an agreement on a framework deal for Iran nuclear activities. The deal is partial and preliminary and serves as a precursor to a full, comprehensive and detailed agreement due to be completed by 30 June 2015. Announcing the framework, Foreign Minister Zarif stated: "No agreement has been reached so we do not have any obligation yet. Nobody has obligations now other than obligations that we already undertook under the Joint Plan of Action that we adopted in Geneva in November 2013."

According to the joint statement,

As Iran pursues a peaceful nuclear program, Iran's enrichment capacity, enrichment level and stockpile will be limited for specific durations and there will be no other enrichment facility than Natanz. Fordow will be converted into a nuclear physics and technology center and Iran's research and development on centrifuges will be carried out based on a mutually agreed framework. A modernized heavy water research reactor in Arak will be redesigned and rebuilt with the assistance of an international joint venture that will not produce weapons-grade plutonium. There will be no nuclear reprocessing, and spent fuel will be exported. Monitor the provisions of the JCPOA including implementation of the modified code 3.1 and provision of the additional protocol, will be done based on a set of measures. To clarify past and present issues regarding Iran's nuclear program, the International Atomic Energy Agency will be permitted the use of modern technologies and will have announced access through agreed procedures. Iran will take part in international cooperation in the field of civilian nuclear energy including supply of power and research reactors as well as nuclear safety and security. The European Union will terminate the implementation of all nuclear-related economic and financial sanctions and the United States will cease the application of all nuclear-related secondary economic and financial sanctions simultaneously with the IAEA-verified implementation by Iran of its key nuclear commitments. To endorse the Joint Comprehensive Plan of Action (JCPOA), a new UN Security Council resolution will be approved that terminates all previous nuclear-related resolutions, and incorporate certain restrictive measures for a mutually agreed period of time.

- Iran's President Hasan Rouhani said on 3 April 2015, "any promises we give will be within framework of our national interests and we will live up to our promises provided that the opposite side abides by its promises as well."
- One week after Lausanne negotiations, Iran's Supreme Leader, Ali Khamenei, explained his idea about the negotiations. He neither accepted nor rejected the framework deal and stated that: "nothing has happened yet." About sanctions, he proclaimed all sanctions must be completely lifted on the day of the nuclear deal is signed.
- The Israeli Prime Minister Benjamin Netanyahu said on 3 April 2015, that he did not like the framework and claims that the current plan of action threatens Israel.
- On 6 April, Obama said, referring to the time after the deal has run its course, "What is a more relevant fear would be that in year 13, 14, 15, they have advanced centrifuges that enrich uranium fairly rapidly, and at that point the breakout times would have shrunk almost down to zero."
- On 9 April, Rouhani said, "We will not sign any deal unless on the very first day of its implementation all economic sanctions against Iran are lifted all at once".

==== Summary of Lausanne statement ====
(as communicated by the U.S. State department)

Parameters of prospective actions by P5+1
Lift all sanctions within 4 to 12 months of a final accord.
Develop a mechanism to restore old sanctions if Iran fails to comply as per IAEA reports and inspection.
The EU will remove energy and banking sanctions.
The United States will remove sanctions against domestic and foreign companies who do business with Iran.
All U.N. resolutions sanctioning Iran will be annulled.
All UN-related sanctions will be dismantled.

Parameters of prospective actions by Iran
Reduction in the number of installed centrifuges from 19,000 to 6,104, of which only 5,060 will enrich uranium. No deployment of advanced centrifuges for the next 10 years.
Not enrich uranium above 3.67% purity (suitable for civil use and nuclear power generation only).
Reduce stockpile of enriched uranium from current 10,000 to not more than 300 kilograms 3.67 percent enrich uranium for 15 years.
Fordow uranium enrichment facility will operate not more than 1,000 centrifuges for research. 5,000 IR-1 centrifuges will be running at Natanz. The remaining 13,000 centrifuges will be used as spare, as needed.
Arak facility will be modified so as to produce a minimal amount of plutonium but will remain a heavy-water reactor.
Allow inspection of all its nuclear facilities and its supply chains such as uranium mining sites (Military sites are not included).

=== After April 2015 ===
In April and May 2015 there was considerable unease in the U.S. Congress about the ongoing negotiations, with both Republicans and Democrats expressing worries that the deal would not prevent Iran from getting the bomb. On 3 March, Israeli Prime Minister Benjamin Netanyahu had addressed a joint session of Congress, outlining his reasons for opposing the deal. On 14 May 2015, the U.S. Congress passed the Iran Nuclear Agreement Review Act of 2015, giving Congress the right to review whatever agreement might be reached.

Talks resumed in Vienna, Austria. The deadline of 30 June was passed, but talks continued.

== Bilateral and trilateral talks ==
=== U.S.–Iran bilateral talks ===
According to a statement of the United States Department of State bilateral nuclear consultations between the U.S. and Iranian officials were to take place "in the context of the P5+1 nuclear negotiations". The talks were held on 7 August 2014 in Geneva and only few details were provided. The U.S. delegation, led by Deputy Secretary of State William J. Burns, included Under Secretary of State Wendy Sherman and Jake Sullivan, national security advisor to Vice President Joe Biden. The Iranian delegation included Deputy Foreign Ministers Abbas Araqchi and Majid Takht-Ravanchi. Deputy Minister Abbas Araqchi said that the bilateral talks were useful and focused on "the existing differences" in the negotiations. Deputy Minister Majid Takht-Ravanchi made it clear that Iran would not accept a weak enrichment programme, while saying "we will not accept that our uranium enrichment programme becomes something like a toy".

The second round of the bilateral talks between representatives from the United States and Iran took place in Geneva on 4–5 September 2014. The negotiations consisted of 12-hour-long political talks and 8-hour-long expert talks. The third round of the bilateral talks between the two countries took place in New York on 18 September 2014. The Associated Press, the United States had turned negotiations into a series of bilateral talks between the two countries that "race to seal a deal". Gary Samore, former White House coordinator for arms control and WMD, participating in a panel, said: "Any deal will have to be struck between Washington and Tehran and then ratified by the P5+1 and ultimately the UN Security Council".

On 14 October 2014 Iranian negotiators headed by the deputy foreign minister held a bilateral meeting with senior U.S. officials William Burns and U.S. Acting Deputy Secretary of State Wendy Sherman in Vienna. Negotiators set the stage for the trilateral meeting with Secretary Kerry, Baroness Ashton, and Foreign Minister Zarif, that was supposed to be convened the next day.

On 15 to 16 December 2014 the U.S. and Iranian delegations met in Geneva to prepare for the multilateral talks, led by Wendy Sherman and Iran's Deputy Foreign Minister Abbas Araqchi. A member of Tehran's team told IRNA that uranium enrichment and how to remove sanctions were sticking points in the bilateral talks.

Iranian Foreign Minister Mohammad Zarif met with Secretary of State John Kerry on 14 January 2015 in Geneva and on 16 January 2015 in Paris. According to Al-Monitor the negotiators had worked intensively to draft a joint document called the 'Principles of Agreement'. The document was an element of the framework agreement between Iran and P5+1, which was to be completed by March 2015.

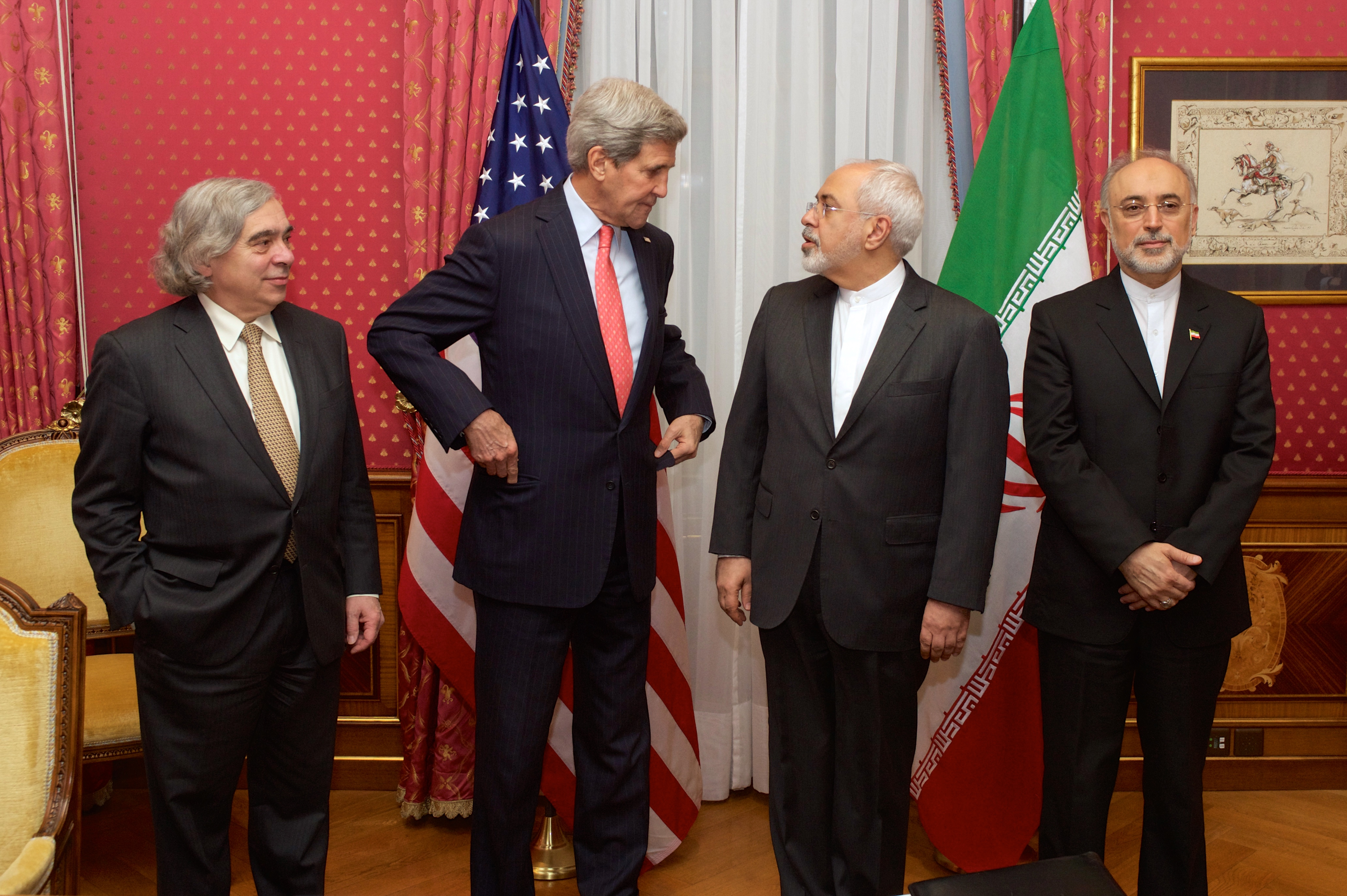
Ernest Moniz, John Kerry, Mohammad Javad Zarif, and Ali Akbar Salehi in Lausanne, 16 March 2015.

Two rounds of bilateral negotiations between Foreign Minister Mohammad Zarif and Secretary of State John Kerry occurred on 6 and 8 February 2015 on the sidelines of the Munich Security Conference. During the conference, Mohammad Zarif said in an interview that IAEA inspected Iran for 10 years or more and found no evidence that Iran's program was not peaceful. He also claimed that JPA did not imply step-by-step removal of sanctions and the removal of sanctions has been "a condition for an agreement". Zarif stated: "I don't think if we don't have an agreement, it'll be the end of the world. I mean, we tried, we failed, fine." IAEA Director General Yukiya Amano, who also took part in the conference, pointed out that Iran had to provide urgent clarification on key aspects of its nuclear program. He said: "Clarification of issues with possible military dimension and implementation of the Additional Protocol and beyond is essential."

U.S. Secretary of State John Kerry and Iran's Foreign Minister Mohammad Zarif held three bilateral meetings in Geneva on 22 and 23 February 2015. The Associated Press reported progress on a deal that would freeze Iran's nuclear activities for at least 10 years and "ease restrictions on programs that could be used to make atomic arms." After the talks Mohammad Zarif spoke about "a better understanding" between the parties and John Kerry said: "We made progress." The columnist Charles Krauthammer commented on the leaked "sunset clause" that an agreement, containing this and other concessions to Iran, will mean "the end of nonproliferation."

From 2–4 March 2015, Iran and U.S. foreign ministers with their teams continued the bilateral nuclear talks in the Swiss city of Montreux. Iran's foreign minister has rejected as "unacceptable" President Barack Obama's demand to freeze sensitive nuclear activities for at least 10 years, saying "Iran will not accept excessive and illogical demands." After the talks, U.S. Secretary of State John Kerry flew to Riyadh, where he was to meet Saudi Arabia's King Salman and the foreign ministers of the members of the Gulf Cooperation Council separately.

On 16 March 2015, another bilateral meeting between Iran's Foreign Minister Zarif and U.S. Secretary of State Kerry took place in Lausanne. Among the issues discussed at the meeting was Tom Cotten's open letter to Iranian leaders, signed by 47 Republican U.S. senators. After the talks a senior U.S. official told reporters it was not clear if the end-March deadline for a framework agreement could be met. Los Angeles Times reported that it was also unclear whether the framework, if reached in March, would be a detailed document or a vague one. The sides were divided on some crucial issues and Iran's supreme leader Ayatollah Khamenei said he wanted no written agreement until all details were settled.

=== U.S.–EU–Iran trilateral talks ===
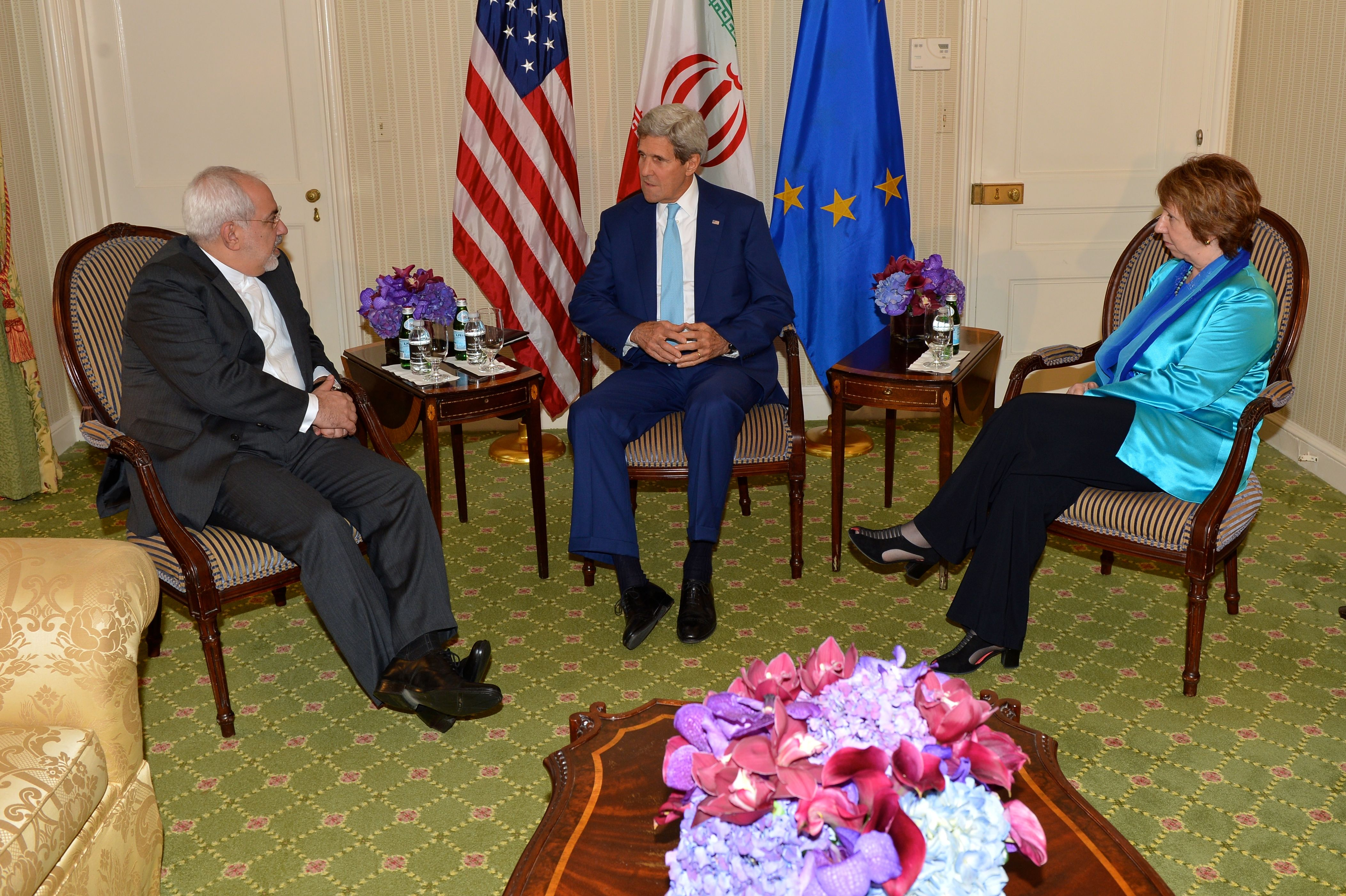
Mohammad Javad Zarif, John Kerry and Catherine Ashton at a trilateral meeting in New York, 26 September 2014

Iran, the EU and the United States held two trilateral meetings at the foreign minister level in New York in September 2014. The U.S. Department of State has argued that there are points when it makes sense for the foreign ministers at the trilateral level to get together to talk. "In part because the majority of the sanctions are EU and U.S., the trilateral makes sense."

On 15 October 2014 Iranian Foreign Minister Mohammad Zarif, EU High Representative Catherine Ashton and Secretary of State John Kerry have met again, this time in Vienna. A senior U.S. Department of State official said at a briefing with reporters that the parties were focused on the 24 November deadline and had not discussed an extension of the talks. The negotiators were working on a full agreement—the understandings and the annexes to them. "This is a situation where unless you have the detail, you do not know that you have the agreement," explained the official.

Secretary of State John Kerry, Iranian Foreign Minister Mohammad Zarif and former EU foreign policy chief Catherine Ashton have held talks on 9–10 November 2014 in Muscat seeking to bridge differences on a comprehensive nuclear agreement. Officials from all delegations have abstained from briefing reporters. The talks ended without an imminent breakthrough.

After arriving in Vienna on 20 November 2014 John Kerry met for more than two hours with Mohammad Zarif and Catherine Ashton. It was not reported whether they made any headway. Zarif said that the nuclear issue was a symptom, not a cause, of mistrust and struggle. Zarif also emphasized on mutual interests of countries.

== Main points at issue in the negotiations ==
=== Uranium stockpile and enrichment ===
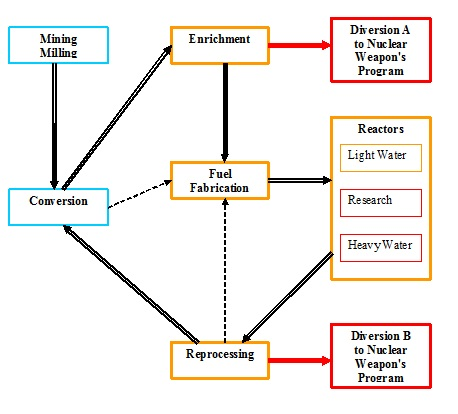
Diagram of nuclear power and weapons cycle

Iran's nuclear enrichment capacity was the biggest stumbling block in the negotiations on a comprehensive agreement. Iran has the right to enrich uranium under article IV of the Nuclear Non-proliferation Treaty. The Security Council in its resolution 1929 has required Iran to suspend its uranium enrichment program. For many years the United States held that no enrichment program should be permitted in Iran. In signing the Geneva interim agreement the United States and its P5+1 partners shifted away from zero enrichment to a limited enrichment objective. Additionally, they have determined that the comprehensive solution will "have a specified long-term duration to be agreed upon" and once it has expired, Iran's nuclear program will not be under special restrictions.

Limited enrichment would mean limits on the numbers and types of centrifuges. Shortly before the comprehensive negotiations began, Iran was estimated to have 19,000 centrifuges installed, mostly first generation IR-1 machines, with about 10,000 of them operating to increase the concentration of uranium-235. The Iranians strive to expand their enrichment capacity by a factor of ten or more while the six powers aim to cut the number of centrifuges to no more than a few thousand.

Michael Singh argued in October 2013, that there were two distinct paths to deal with Iran's nuclear program: complete dismantling or allowing limited activities while preventing Iran from a nuclear "breakout capability", also echoed by Colin H. Kahl, as published by the Center for a New American Security. The measures that would lengthen breakout timelines include "limits on the number, quality and/or output of centrifuges". Former Under Secretary of State for Arms Control and International Security Affairs Robert Joseph argued in the August 2014 National Review, published by the Arms Control Association, that attempts to overcome the impasse over centrifuges by using a malleable separative work unit metric "as a substitute for limiting the number of centrifuges is nothing more than sleight of hand." He has also quoted former U.S. Secretary of State Hillary Clinton saying "any enrichment will trigger an arms race in the Middle East."

Colin Kahl, former Deputy Assistant U.S. Secretary of Defense for the Middle East, estimated in May 2014 that Iran's stockpile was large enough to build 6 nuclear weapons and it had to be reduced. Constraints on Iran's uranium enrichment would reduce the chance that its nuclear program could be used to make nuclear warheads. The number and quality of centrifuges, research and development of advanced centrifuges, and the size of low-enriched uranium stockpiles, would be relevant. The constraints were interrelated with each other, that the more centrifuges Iran had, the smaller the stockpile the United States and P5+1 should accept, and vice versa. Lengthening breakout timelines required a substantial reduction in enrichment capacity, and many experts talk about an acceptable range of about 2,000 to 6,000 first-generation centrifuges. Iran stated that it wanted to extend its capability substantially. In May 2014 Robert J. Einhorn, former Special Advisor on Non-Proliferation and Arms Control at the U.S. Department of State, claimed that if Iran was to continue to insist on what he considered to be a huge number of centrifuges, then there would be no agreement, since this enrichment capacity would bring the breakout time down to weeks or days.

=== Plutonium production and separation ===
Under Secretary of State Wendy Sherman, testifying before the Senate Committee on Foreign Relations, said that a good deal will be one that cuts off Iran's uranium, plutonium and covert pathways to obtain nuclear weapons. Secretary of State John Kerry has testified before the United States House Committee on Foreign Affairs and expressed great concerns about the Arak nuclear reactor facility. "Now, we have strong feelings about what will happen in a final comprehensive agreement. From our point of view, Arak is unacceptable. You can't have a heavy-water reactor," he said. President Barack Obama, while addressing the House of Representatives and Senate, emphasized that "these negotiations do not rely on trust; any long-term deal we agree to must be based on verifiable action that convinces us and the international community that Iran is not building a nuclear bomb."

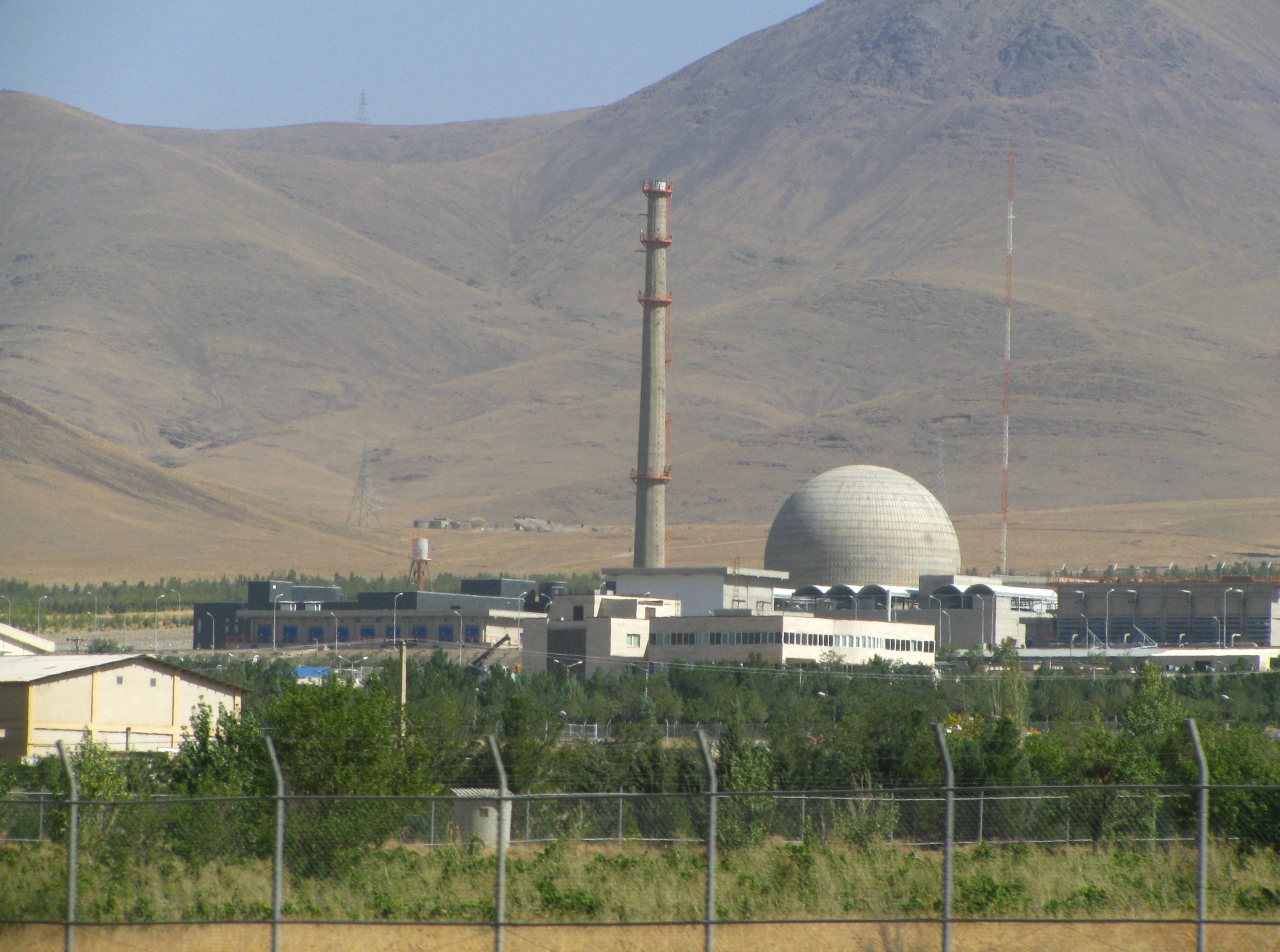
Arak Heavy Water Reactor (IR-40)

Fred Fleitz, a former CIA analyst and Chief of Staff to the United States Undersecretary of State for Arms, felt that compromises made by the Obama administration to achieve an agreement with Iran would be dangerous. Fleitz believed that such concessions were being proposed, and that the "... most dangerous is that we are considering letting Iran keep the Arak heavy water reactor which will be a source of plutonium. Plutonium is the most desired nuclear fuel for a bomb, it has a lower critical mass, you need less of it which is important in building a missile warhead."

The head of Atomic Energy Organization of Iran Ali Akbar Salehi said that the heavy water reactor of Arak was designed as a research reactor and not for plutonium production. It will produce about 9 kg of plutonium but not weapons-grade plutonium. Dr. Salehi explained that "if you want to use the plutonium of this reactor you need a reprocessing plant". "We do not have a reprocessing plant, we do not intend, although it is our right, we will not forgo our right, but we do not intend to build a reprocessing plant." Salehi felt that the Western claims of concern about Iran developing nuclear weapons were not genuine, and that they were an excuse for applying political pressure on Iran.

According to information provided by the Federation of American Scientists, a sizable research program involving the production of heavy water might raise concerns about a plutonium-based weapon program, especially if such program was not easily justifiable on other accounts. Gregory S. Jones, a senior researcher and a defense policy analyst, claimed that if the heavy-water-production plant at Arak were not dismantled, Iran would be granted a "plutonium option" for acquiring nuclear weapons in addition to the centrifuge enrichment program.

=== Agreement's duration ===
According to a November 2013 editorial in The Washington Post, the most troubling part of the Geneva interim agreement has been the "long-term duration" clause. This provision means that when the duration expires, "the Iranian nuclear program will be treated in the same manner as that of any non-nuclear weapon state party" to the NPT. Thus, once the comprehensive agreement expires, Iran will be able to "install an unlimited number of centrifuges and produce plutonium without violating any international accord." The Nonproliferation Policy Education Center stated in May 2014 "clearly [the agreement] will only be a long-term interim agreement".

The Brookings Institution suggested in March 2014 that if a single 20-year duration for all provisions of the agreement is too constraining, it would be possible to agree on different durations for different provisions. Some provisions could have short duration, and others could be longer. A few constraints, like enhanced monitoring at specific facilities, could be permanent.

Al Jazeera reported in October 2014, that Iran wanted any agreement to last for at most 5 years while the United States prefers 20 years. The twenty years is viewed as a minimum amount of time to develop confidence that Iran can be treated as other non-nuclear weapon states and allow the IAEA enough time to verify that Iran is fully compliant with all its non-proliferation obligations.

== Possible covert paths to fissile material ==
The Iranian uranium enrichment facilities at Natanz (FEP and PFEP) and Fordow (FFEP) were constructed covertly and designed to operate in a similar manner. In September 2009, Iran notified the International Atomic Energy Agency about constructing the Fordow facility only after it and Natanz were revealed by other sources. The Belfer Center for Science and International Affairs quoted in 2014 a 2007 U.S. National Intelligence Estimate on Iran's nuclear capabilities and intentions stated: "We assess with high confidence that until fall 2003, Iranian military entities were working under government direction to develop nuclear weapons." Additionally the Estimate stated that after 2003 Iran had halted the covert enrichment for at least several years. The Estimate also stated: "We assess with moderate confidence that Iran probably would use covert facilities—rather than its declared nuclear sites—for the production of highly enriched uranium for a weapon." Some analysts have argued that negotiations between Iran and the P5+1, as well as most public discussions, were focused on Iran's overt nuclear facilities while alternative paths to obtain fissile material existed. Graham Allison, former United States Assistant Secretary of Defense, and Oren Setter, a research fellow at Belfer Center, compared this approach with Maginot's fixation on a single threat "that led to fatal neglect of alternatives". They pointed out at least three additional paths to obtain such material: Covert make, covert buy and hybrid pathway (a combination of overt and covert paths).

The Belfer Center also quotes William Tobey, former Deputy Administrator for Defense Nuclear Nonproliferation at the National Nuclear Security Administration, as outlining the possible ways to nuclear weapons as follows: Break out of the Nonproliferation Treaty, using declared facilities, sneak out of the treaty, using covert facilities and buy a weapon from another nation or rogue faction.

The Belfer Center published recommendations for agreement provisions relating to monitoring and verification in order to prevent covert activities and to provide tools to react if needed. One of the sources warned the P5+1 that "if the monitoring elements that we recommend are not pursued now to diminish the risks of deception, it is difficult to envision that Iran would be compliant in the future, post-sanctions environment." According to the recommendations the agreement with Iran should include a requirement to cooperate with the IAEA inspectors in compliance with the UN Security Council resolutions, transparency for centrifuges, mines and mills for uranium ore and yellowcake, monitoring of nuclear-related procurement, an obligation to ratify and implement the Additional Protocol and to provide the IAEA enhanced powers beyond the Protocol, adhering to the modified Code 3.1, monitoring of nuclear research and development (R&D), defining certain activities as breaches of the agreement that could provide basis for timely intervention.

== IAEA inspection ==
The International Atomic Energy Agency inspected Iran's nuclear facilities several times annually since 2007, publishing from one to four reports each year. According to multiple resolutions of the United Nations Security Council (resolutions 1737, 1747, 1803, and 1929), enacted under Chapter VII of the United Nations Charter, Iran is obligated to cooperate fully with the IAEA on "all outstanding issues, particularly those which give rise to concerns about the possible military dimensions of the Iranian nuclear programme, including by providing access without delay to all sites, equipment, persons and documents requested by the IAEA. ..." On 11 November 2013 the IAEA and Iran signed a Joint Statement on a Framework for Cooperation committing both parties to cooperate and resolve all present and past issues in a step by step manner. As a first step, the Framework identified six practical measures to be completed within three months. The IAEA reported that Iran had implemented those six measures in time. In February and May 2014 the parties agreed to additional sets of measures related to the Framework. In September the IAEA continued to report that Iran was not implementing its Additional Protocol, which is a prerequisite for the IAEA "to provide assurance about both declared and possible undeclared activities." Under those circumstances, the Agency reported it will not be able to provide "credible assurance about the absence of undeclared nuclear material and activities in Iran".

The implementation of interim Geneva Accord has involved transparency measures and enhanced monitoring to ensure the peaceful nature of Iran's nuclear program. It was agreed that the IAEA will be "solely responsible for verifying and confirming all nuclear-related measures, consistent with its ongoing inspection role in Iran". IAEA inspection has included daily access to Natanz and Fordow and managed access to centrifuge production facilities, uranium mines and mills, and the Arak heavy water reactor. To implement these and other verification steps, Iran committed to "provide increased and unprecedented transparency into its nuclear program, including through more frequent and intrusive inspections as well as expanded provision of information to the IAEA."

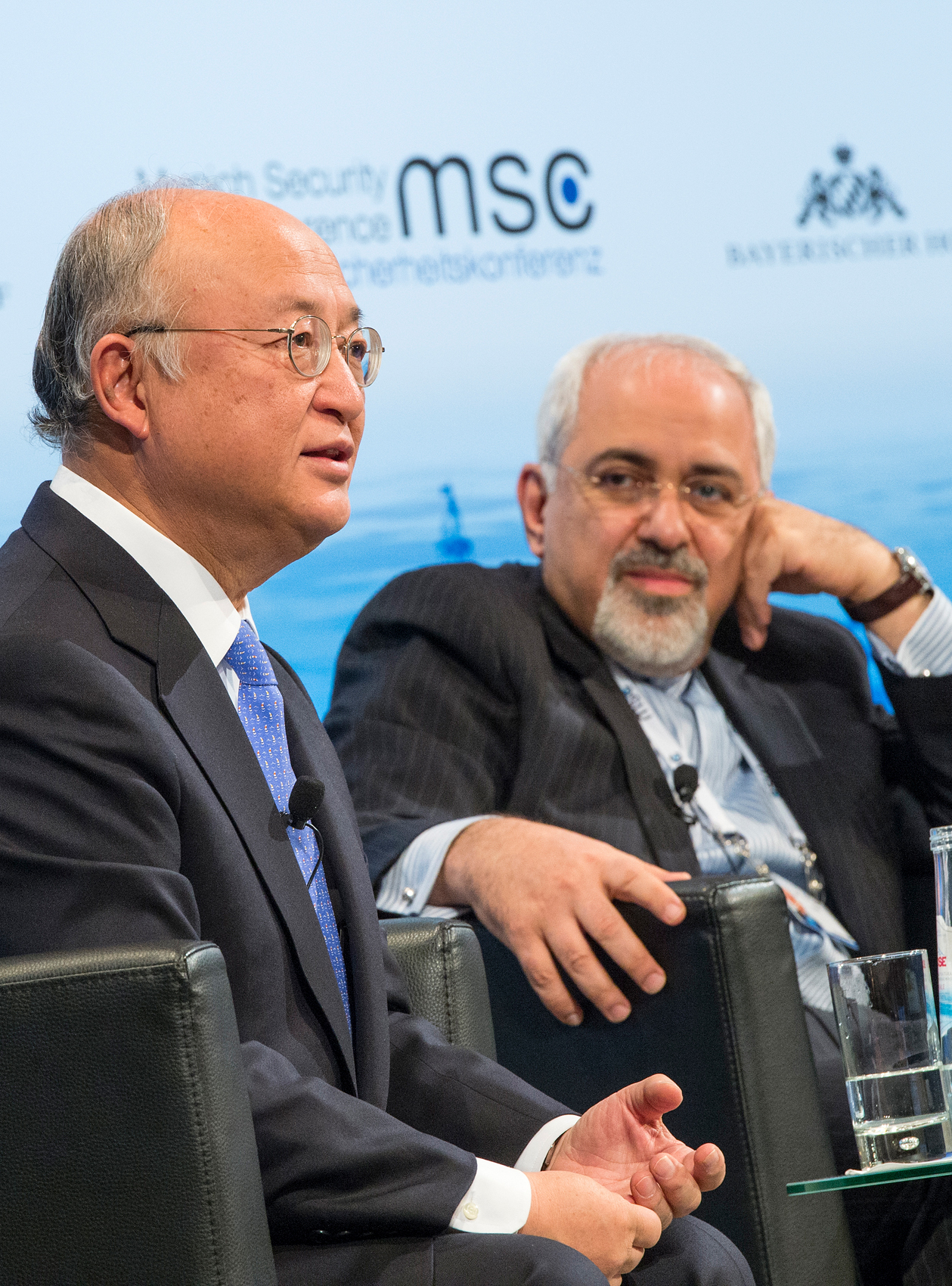
Yukiya Amano and Mohammad Javad Zarif

Thus, there have been two ongoing diplomatic tracks—one by the P5+1 to curb Iran's nuclear program and a second by the IAEA to resolve questions about the peaceful nature of Iran's past nuclear activities. Although the IAEA inquiry has been formally separate from JPA negotiations, Washington said a successful IAEA investigation should be part of any final deal and that may be unlikely by the deadline of 24 November 2014.

One expert on Iran's nuclear program, David Albright, has explained that "It's very hard if you are an IAEA inspector or analyst to say we can give you confidence that there's not a weapons program today if you don't know about the past. Because you don't know what was done. You don't know what they accomplished." Albright argued that this history is important since the "infrastructure that was created could pop back into existence at any point in secret and move forward on nuclear weapons."

Iranian and IAEA officials met in Tehran on 16 and 17 August 2014 and discussed the five practical measures in the third step of the Framework for Cooperation agreed in May 2014. Yukiya Amano, Director General of the IAEA, made a one-day visit to Tehran on 17 August and held talks with President of Iran Hassan Rouhani and other senior officials. After the visit Iranian media criticized the IAEA while reporting that President Rouhani and the head of Atomic Energy Organization of Iran Salehi both tried "to make the IAEA chief Mr. Amano understand that there is an endpoint to Iran's flexibility." The same week Iranian Defense Minister Hossein Dehghan said that Iran will not give IAEA inspectors access to Parchin military base. Yukiya Amano has noted previously that access to the Parchin base was essential for the Agency to be in position to certify Iran's nuclear programme as peaceful. Tehran was supposed to provide the IAEA with information related to the initiation of high explosives and to neutron transport calculations until 25 August, but it failed to address these issues. The two issues are associated with compressed materials that are required to produce a warhead small enough to fit on top of a missile. During its 7–8 October meetings with the IAEA in Tehran, Iran failed to propose any new practical measures to resolve the disputable issues.

On 19 February 2015 IAEA has released its quarterly safeguards report on Iran. While testifying before the United States House Foreign Affairs Subcommittee on the Middle East and North Africa, Institute for Science and International Security president David Albright commented on Iran's reaction to this report: "the Iranian government continues to dissemble and stonewall the inspectors and remains committed to severely weakening IAEA safeguards and verification in general."

== Nuclear-related issues beyond the negotiations ==
There are many steps toward nuclear weapons. However, an effective nuclear weapons capability has only three major elements:

- Fissile or nuclear material in sufficient quantity and quality
- Effective means for delivery, such as a ballistic missile
- Design, weaponization, miniaturization, and survivability of the warhead

Evidence presented by the IAEA has shown that Iran has pursued all three of these elements: it has been enriching uranium for more than ten years and is constructing a heavy water reactor to produce plutonium, it has a well-developed ballistic missile program, and it has tested high explosives and compressed materials that can be used for nuclear warheads.

Some analysts believe that the elements that they believe would together constitute an Iranian nuclear weapons program should be negotiated together — the negotiations would include not only Iranian fissile material discussions but also Iranian ballistic missile development and Iranian weaponization issues.

=== Priorities in monitoring and prevention ===
Henry Kissinger, former U.S. Secretary of State, stated in his 2014 book: "The best—perhaps the only—way to prevent the emergence of a nuclear weapons capability is to inhibit the development of a uranium-enrichment process.

Joint Plan of Action has not explicitly addressed the future status of Iran's ballistic missile program. According to the Atlantic Council, as the Joint Plan of Action was an interim agreement, it could not take into account all the issues that should be resolved as part of a comprehensive agreement. If a comprehensive agreement with Iran "does not tackle the issue of ballistic missiles, it will fall short of and may undermine ... UN Security Council Resolutions." Moreover, shifting "monitoring and prevention aims onto warheads without addressing Iran's ballistic missile capacity also ignores U.S. legislation that forms the foundation of the sanctions regime against Iran".

The Atlantic Council also stated that "monitoring warhead production is far more difficult than taking stock" of ballistic missiles and the U.S. government is far less good at detecting advanced centrifuges or covert facilities for manufacturing nuclear warheads.

Anthony Cordesman, a former Pentagon official and a holder of the Arleigh A. Burke Chair in Strategy at the Center for Strategic and International Studies (CSIS), highlighted the view that the United States and other members of the P5+1, along with their attempts to limit Iran's breakout capability and to prevent it from getting even one nuclear device, should mainly focus "on reaching a full agreement that clearly denies Iran any ability to covertly create an effective nuclear force."

=== Ballistic missile program ===
Iran's ballistic missiles have been claimed as evidence that Iran's nuclear program is weapons-related rather than civilian. Security Council Resolution 1929 "decides that Iran shall not undertake any activity related to ballistic missiles capable of delivering nuclear weapons." In May–June 2014 a United Nations panel of experts submitted a report pointing to Iran's engagement in ballistic missile activities. The Panel reported that over the last year Iran has conducted a number of ballistic missile test launches, which were a violation of paragraph 9 of the resolution.

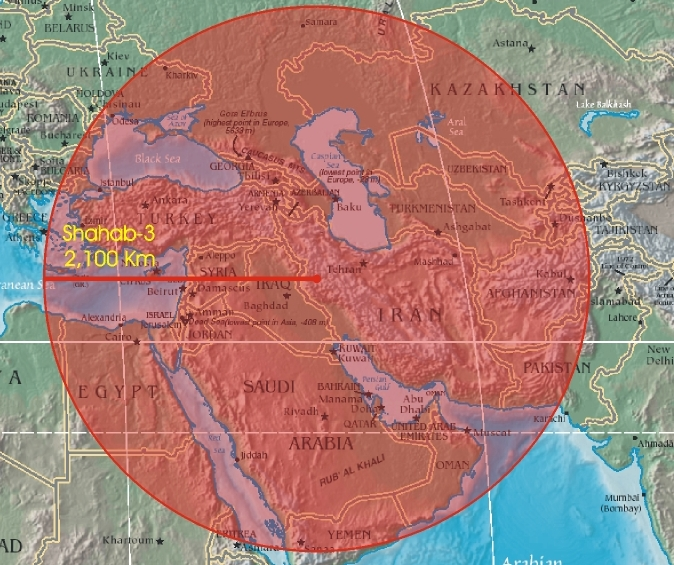
Shahab-3 estimated threat range

Director of U.S. National Intelligence James Clapper testified on 12 March 2013, that Iran's ballistic missiles were capable of delivering WMD. According to some analysts, the liquid-fueled Shahab-3 missile and the solid-fueled Sejjil missile have the ability to carry a nuclear warhead. Iran's ballistic missile program is controlled by IRGC Air Force (AFAGIR), while Iran's combat aircraft is under the command of the regular Iranian Air Force (IRIAF).

The United States and its allies view Iran's ballistic missiles as a subject for the talks on a comprehensive agreement since they regard it as a part of Iran's potential nuclear threat. Members of Iran's negotiating team in Vienna insisted the talks will not focus on this issue.

A few days before 15 May, date when the next round of the negotiations was scheduled, Iran's Supreme Leader Ayatollah Ali Khamenei responded to Western expectations on limits to Iran's missile program by saying that "[t]hey expect us to limit our missile program while they constantly threaten Iran with military action. So this is a stupid, idiotic expectation." He then called on the country's Islamic Revolutionary Guard Corps (IRGC) to continue mass-producing missiles.

In his testimony before the United States House Committee on Armed Services, Managing Director of the Washington Institute for Near East Policy Michael Singh argued "that Iran should be required to cease elements of its ballistic-missile and space-launch programs as part of a nuclear accord." This question was off the table since Iran's Supreme Leader has insisted that Iran's missile program is off-limits in the negotiations and P5+1 officials have been ambiguous.

According to Debka.com, the United States in its direct dialogue with Iran outside the P5+1 framework demanded to restrict Iran's intercontinental ballistic missiles (ICBMs), whose 4,000-kilometer range places Europe and the United States at risk. This demand did not apply to ballistic missiles, whose range of 2,100 km covers any point in the Middle East. These medium-range missiles may also be nuclear and are capable of striking Israel, Saudi Arabia and the Persian Gulf.

In a Senate committee hearing former U.S. Secretary of State George Shultz has expressed belief that Iran's missile program and its ICBM capability, as well as what he described as Iran's support of the terrorism, should also be on the table.

=== Possible military dimensions ===
Since 2002, the IAEA has become concerned and noted in its reports that some elements of Iran's nuclear program could be used for military purposes. More detailed information about suspected weaponization aspects of Iran's nuclear program—the possible military dimensions (PMD)—has been provided in the IAEA reports issued in May 2008 and November 2011. The file of Iran's PMD issues included development of detonators, high explosives initiation systems, neutron initiators, nuclear payloads for missiles and other kinds of developments, calculations and tests. The Security Council Resolution 1929 reaffirmed "that Iran shall cooperate fully with the IAEA on all outstanding issues, particularly those which give rise to concerns about the possible military dimensions of the Iranian nuclear program, including by providing access without delay to all sites, equipment, persons and documents requested by the IAEA."

In November 2013 Iran and the IAEA have signed a Joint Statement on a Framework for Cooperation committing both parties to resolve all present and past issues. In the same month the P5+1 and Iran have signed the Joint Plan of Action, which aimed to develop a long-term comprehensive solution for Iran's nuclear program. The IAEA continued to investigate PMD issues as a part of the Framework for Cooperation. The P5+1 and Iran have committed to establish a Joint Commission to work with the IAEA to monitor implementation of the Joint Plan and "to facilitate resolution of past and present issues of concern" with respect to Iran's nuclear program, including PMD of the program and Iran's activities at Parchin. Some analysts asked what happens if Iran balks and IAEA fails to resolve significant PDM issues. According to the U.S. Department of State, any compliance issues wouldn't be discussed by the Joint Commission but would first be dealt with "at the expert level, and then come up to the political directors and up to foreign ministers if needed." Thus, an unresolved issue might be declared sufficiently addressed as a result of a political decision.

Prior to the signing of an interim nuclear agreement, it was commonly understood in Washington that Iran must "come clean about the possible military dimensions of its nuclear program," as Undersecretary Wendy Sherman testified before the Senate Foreign Relations Committee in 2011. The Iranians have refused to acknowledge having a weaponization program. Meanwhile, analysts close to the Obama administration begin to boost the so-called limited disclosure option. Nevertheless, 354 members of U.S. Congress were "deeply concerned with Iran's refusal to fully cooperate with the International Atomic Energy Agency." On 1 October 2014, they sent a letter to Secretary of State John Kerry stating that "Iran's willingness to fully reveal all aspects of its nuclear program is a fundamental test of Iran's intention to uphold a comprehensive agreement."

Some organizations have published lists of suspected nuclear-weaponization facilities in Iran. Below is a partial list of such facilities:

- Institute of Applied Physics (IAP)
- Kimia Maadan Company (KM)
- Parchin Military Complex
- Physics Research Center (PHRC)
- Tehran Nuclear Research Center (TNRC)

In September 2014 the IAEA reported about ongoing reconstructions at Parchin military base. The Agency has anticipated that these activities will further undermine its ability to conduct effective verification if and when this location would be open for inspection. A month later, The New York Times reported that according to a statement by Yukiya Amano, the IAEA Director General, Iran had stopped answering the Agency's questions about suspected past weaponization issues. Iran has argued that what has been described as evidence is fabricated. In his speech at Brookings Institution Yukiya Amano said that progress has been limited and two important practical measures, which should have been implemented by Iran two months ago, have still not been implemented. Mr. Amano stressed his commitment to work with Iran "to restore international confidence in the peaceful nature of its nuclear programme". But he also warned: "this is not a never-ending process. It is very important that Iran fully implements the Framework for Cooperation—sooner rather than later."

On 16 June 2015 U.S. Secretary John Kerry told reporters that the possible military dimensions problem was a little distorted, since the U.S. was "not fixated on Iran specifically accounting for what they did" and the U.S. had "absolute knowledge" with respect to this issue. CNN reminded that according to the framework deal Iran "will implement an agreed set of measures to address the IAEA's concerns" about the PMD. It also reported that about two months ago Secretary Kerry told PBS that Iran had to disclose its past military-related nuclear activities and this "will be part of a final agreement".

=== Debate over whether or not Khamenei issued a Fatwa against the production of nuclear weapons ===
At an August 2005 meeting of the International Atomic Energy Agency (IAEA) in Vienna, the Iranian Government asserted that Ali Khamenei has issued a fatwa declaring that the production, stockpiling and use of nuclear weapons is forbidden under Islam. In a 2015 interview with Thomas Friedman of The New York Times, President Obama cited Khamenei's purported Fatwa "that they will not have a nuclear weapon."

Doubts have been cast by some experts from U.S. or Israeli-affiliated think tanks on either the existence of the fatwa, its authenticity or impact. The Iranian official website for information regarding its nuclear program documents numerous instances of public statements by Khamenei wherein he voices his opposition to pursuit and development of nuclear weapons in moral, religious and Islamic juridical terms. Khamenei's official website specifically cites a 2010 statement, in which Khamenei says "We consider the use of [nuclear] weapons as haraam [forbidden]" of these statements in the fatwa section of the website in Farsi as a fatwa on "Prohibition of Weapons of Mass Destruction." Ayatollah Ali Khamenei also declared that the United States created the myth nuclear weapons in order to show Iran as a threat.

Fact checker Glenn Kessler of The Washington Post took a look at the Fatwa question. He notes that in Shiite tradition, oral and written opinions carry equal weight, so the lack of a written Fatwa is not necessarily dispositive. He also notes that while Khamenei said in 2005 that "production of an atomic bomb is not on our agenda," more recently he has said the use of nuclear weapons is forbidden, while saying nothing about their development. Kessler sums up by saying that even if one believes the Fatwa does exist, it appears to have changed over time, and refused to give a verdict on the truth of the matter.

The negotiations on the Comprehensive agreement on the Iranian nuclear program have been accompanied by an extensive debate over whether or not such an agreement is a good idea. Prominent supporters include President Barack Obama. Prominent opponents include Israeli Prime Minister Benjamin Netanyahu, former Secretaries of State Henry Kissinger and George P. Shultz, and Democratic Senator Bob Menendez.

=== Debate over what a deal means for the risk of war ===
Obama has argued that failure of the negotiations would increase the chance of a military confrontation between the United States and Iran. In an interview with Thomas Friedman, Obama argued that an agreement would be the best chance to ease tensions between the U.S. and Iran.

Opponents have countered that the proposed deal would concede to Iran a vast nuclear infrastructure, giving it the status of a threshold nuclear state. They argue that rivals such as Saudi Arabia would likely counter by becoming threshold nuclear states themselves, leading to an inherently unstable situation with multiple rival near-nuclear powers. They argue that such a situation would heighten the risk of war and even the risk of nuclear war.

=== Debate over whether an agreement would promote cooperation ===
Iran's foreign minister Mohammad Javad Zarif argued in The New York Times that the framework agreed on in April, 2015 would end any doubt that Iran's nuclear program is peaceful. Zarif also argued that a deal would open the way to regional cooperation based on respect for sovereignty and noninterference in the affairs of other states.

Opponents such as Schultz, Kissinger, and Netanyahu are skeptical of promises of cooperation. Netanyahu argued that Iran's "tentacles of terror" were threatening Israel, and an Iranian nuclear bomb would "threaten the survival of my country." He pointed to tweets from Ali Khamenei calling for the destruction of Israel. He said that any agreement with Iran should include an end of Iranian aggression against its neighbors and recognition of Israel. For their part, Schultz and Kissinger note a lack of evidence of Iranian cooperation to date.

=== Debate over alternatives ===
Supporters of a deal with Iran have said that opponents do not offer a viable alternative, or that the only alternative is war. Netanyahu argued that the alternative to the deal currently being negotiated is a better deal, because, he said, Iran needs a deal more than the West does. Other opponents have argued that a war is in fact the best option for the West, as, they say, sanctions have historically failed to stop nuclear programs.

== Negotiating countries ==
=== Islamic Republic of Iran ===
The United States and Iran cut off diplomatic ties in 1979 after the Islamic Revolution and the storming of the U.S. Embassy in Tehran, where 52 Americans were held hostage for more than a year. After Barack Obama's inauguration, he authorized talks with Iran in order to reach out to this country.

The FATF has been "particularly and exceptionally concerned" about Iran's failure to address the risk of terrorist financing. Iran was included in FATF blacklist. In 2014 Iran remained a state of proliferation concern. Despite multiple United Nations Security Council resolutions requiring Iran to suspend its sensitive nuclear proliferation activities, Iran has continued to violate its international obligations regarding its nuclear program.

Iran insists that its nuclear program is "completely peaceful and has always been carrying out under supervision of the IAEA". Some analysts argue that "Iranian actions, including the evidence of work on weaponization, the development of long-range ballistic missiles, and the placement of the program within the IRGC" indicate that Iran's arsenal is not virtual.

According to policy documents published by the Obama administration, it believes in the efficacy of traditional Cold War deterrence as the remedy to the challenge of states acquiring nuclear weapons. Another assumption of the administration is that the Iranian regime is "rational" and hence deterrable. Dr. Shmuel Bar, former Director of Studies at the Institute of Policy and Strategy in Herzliya, has argued in his research that the Cold War deterrence doctrine will not be applicable to nuclear Iran. The inherent instability of the Middle East and its regimes, the difficulty in managing multilateral nuclear tensions, the weight of religious, emotional, and internal pressures, and the proclivity of many of the regimes toward military adventurism and brinkmanship give little hope for the future of the region once it enters the nuclear age. By its own admission, the Iranian regime favors revolution and is against the status quo in the region. Shmuel Bar has characterized the regime as follows:

"Since its inception, it has been committed to 'propagation of Islam' (tablighi eslami) and 'export of revolution' (sudur inqilab). The former is viewed by the regime as a fundamental Islamic duty and the latter as a prime tenet of the regime's ideology, enshrined in the constitution and the works of the Imam Khomeini. Together they form a worldview that sees Islamic Iran as a nation with a 'manifest destiny': to lead the Muslim world and to become a predominant regional 'superpower' in the Gulf, the heart of the Arab world, and in Central Asia."

A quite different approach to Iran has been proposed by The Economist:

"The disastrous presidency of Mahmoud Ahmadinejad, the failed Green revolution—which sought to topple him in 2009—and the chaotic Arab spring have for the moment discredited radical politics and boosted pragmatic centrists. The traditional religious society that the mullahs dreamt of has receded... Although this hardly amounts to democracy, it is a political marketplace and, as Mr Ahmadinejad discovered, policies that tack away from the consensus do not last. That is why last year Iran elected a president, Hassan Rohani, who wants to open up to the world and who has reined in the hardline Islamic Revolutionary Guard Corps."

On 4 January 2015 President of Iran Hassan Rouhani pointed out that the Iranians' cause was not connected to a centrifuge, but to their "heart and willpower". He added that Iran could not have sustainable growth while it was isolated. So he would like some economic reforms passed by referendum. These words could be considered as willingness to work with international powers. But a few days later Supreme Leader Ali Khamenei warned that "Americans are impudently saying that even if Iran backs down on the nuclear issue, all the sanctions will not be lifted at once." Iran should therefore "take the instrument of sanctions out of enemy's hands" and develop "economic of resistance."

Former U.S. Secretary of State George Shultz, testifying in January 2015 before the United States Senate Committee on Armed Services, said about Iranian nuclear ambitions:

"They're trying to develop nuclear weapons. There is no sensible explanation for the extent, the money, the talent they've devoted to their nuclear thing, other than that they want a nuclear weapon. It can't be explained any other way."
"They give every indication, Mr Chairman, that they don't want a nuclear weapon for deterrence, they want a nuclear weapon to use it on Israel. So it's a very threatening situation."

According to Islamic Republic News Agency the talks were based on the "guidelines of the Supreme Leader of the Islamic Revolution".

==== Iran's detention of foreign and dual nationals during negotiations ====
During the negotiations, Iran escalated its practice of detaining Western citizens and dual nationals on unsubstantiated and vague charges like "collusion against national security" or "espionage", a strategy widely characterized as hostage diplomacy. This involved imprisoning people to use them as bargaining chips for diplomatic and financial leverage. The number of people Iran arrested spiked around 2014, with at least 30 detained in four years. Analysts say that some people were deliberately taken by hard-line elements who wanted to sabotage the deal's potential to generate warmer relations.

=== P5+1 ===
==== United States ====
In its Nuclear Posture Review in April 2010 the United States has stated that in Asia and the Middle East—where there were no military alliances analogous to NATO—it had mainly extended deterrence through bilateral alliances and security relationships and through its forward military presence and security guarantees. According to the Review Report: "The Administration is pursuing strategic dialogues with its allies and partners in East Asia and the Middle East to determine how best to cooperatively strengthen regional security architectures to enhance peace and security, and reassure them that U.S. extended deterrence is credible and effective." Since 2010 the U.S. position has been less clear and it seems "to be deliberately lowering its profile—either because it might interference with negotiations by the 5+1 or because it has less support within the Obama Administration."

Two weeks after the Geneva interim deal was achieved, President Barack Obama disclosed in an interview that while taking office, he decided to "reach out to Iran" and open up a diplomatic channel. He emphasized: "the best way for us to prevent Iran from getting a nuclear weapons is for a comprehensive, verifiable, diplomatic resolution, without taking any other options off the table if we fail to achieve that." The President also expressed strong belief that an end state can be envisioned, where Iran will not have breakout capacity. President Obama, however, added: "If you asked me what is the likelihood that we're able to arrive at the end state that I was just describing earlier, I wouldn't say that it's more than 50/50."

About 14 months after the Geneva interim agreement was signed, Obama reiterated his assessment that the chances to "get a diplomatic deal are probably less than 50/50." Shortly afterwards, in his State of the Union presented to a joint session of the United States Congress, the President announced: "Our diplomacy is at work with respect to Iran, where, for the first time in a decade, we've halted the progress of its nuclear program and reduced its stockpile of nuclear material." The accuracy of this statement has been challenged by some media sources. For example, based on experts' assessments Glenn Kessler from The Washington Post has come to the conclusion that between 2013 and 2014 the amount of nuclear material, which could be converted by Iran to a bomb, has been increased. Olli Heinonen observed that the interim agreement "is just a step to create negotiation space; nothing more. It is not a viable longer term situation." Jeffrey Lewis observed that Obama's statement was an oversimplification, and that while Iran's stockpiles of the "most dangerous" nuclear materials had declined, overall stocks had increased.

On the basis of international inspectors' reports, The New York Times estimated on 1 June 2015 that Iran's stockpile of nuclear fuel increased by about 20 percent during the last 18 months of negotiations, "partially undercutting the Obama administration's contention that the Iranian program had been 'frozen'".

==== United Kingdom ====
The United Kingdom is interested in constructive relationship with Iran. For decades Iran has been regarded as a threat to the security of the UK and its regional partners in the Middle East and in the Persian Gulf. The UK believes that negotiations in Vienna are the most appropriate framework for coping with Iranian nuclear intentions. The British Government is satisfied with the convergence of UK and US policy on Iran and with a united front maintained by the P5+1 countries. It also assures that the agreement with Iran does not imply any diminution in the commitments to the alliances in the region and to the struggle against terrorism. The Foreign Affairs Committee of the House of Commons expressed opinion that the comprehensive agreement should include the issues of the Parchin Military Complex.

== Non-negotiating countries' positions ==
=== Saudi Arabia ===
Saudi Arabia fears that a deal with Iran could come at expense of Sunni Arabs. U.S. President Barack Obama paid a visit to Riyadh in March 2014 and assured King Abdullah that he is determined to stop Iran from getting a nuclear weapon and that the United States would not accept a bad deal. However, an editorial in Al Riyadh newspaper claimed that the president did not know Iran as the Saudis did, and could not convince them that Iran will be peaceful.

In 2015, a report in the Sunday Times quoted unnamed senior U.S. officials asserting that Saudi Arabia had made the decision to buy a nuclear weapon from Pakistan, due to anger among Sunni Arab states at the Iran deal, which they feared would allow Iran to get a nuclear weapon.

=== Israel ===
After the meetings between Western foreign ministers and Iranian counterpart on 13 July 2014 Prime Minister of Israel Benjamin Netanyahu in an interview with Fox News stated that "a bad deal is actually worse than no deal." He stated that allowing Iran to stockpile nuclear material or to preserve the capability of uranium enrichment in return for the presence of international inspectors would lead to a "catastrophic development". At his meeting with Barack Obama in Washington in October 2014, Benjamin Netanyahu warned the U.S. President not to accept any Iran deal that would allow Tehran to become a "threshold nuclear power." Netanyahu's remark highlighted the long-standing disagreement between Israel and the Obama administration on the nuclear talks with Iran.

In his speech presented to a joint session of the U.S. Congress on 3 March 2015, Israeli Prime Minister Benjamin Netanyahu said that the negotiated deal was bad because of its two major concessions: leaving Iran with a vast nuclear program and lifting the restrictions on that program in about a decade. "It doesn't block Iran's path to the bomb; it paves Iran's path to the bomb," said the Prime Minister. Netanyahu also urged the leaders of the world "not to repeat the mistakes of the past" and expressed his commitment that "if Israel has to stand alone, Israel will stand."

In an April 2015 interview with Thomas Friedman, President Obama stated that he is "absolutely committed to making sure that they (Israel) maintain their qualitative military edge, and that they can deter any potential future attacks, but what I'm willing to do is to make the kinds of commitments that would give everybody in the neighborhood, including Iran, a clarity that if Israel were to be attacked by any state, that we would stand by them." He later added, "What I would say to the Israeli people is ... that there is no formula, there is no option, to prevent Iran from getting a nuclear weapon that will be more effective than the diplomatic initiative and framework that we put forward — and that's demonstrable." In National Public Radio (NPR), Obama answered negative response to Netanyahu's demand in Iran's recognition of Israel. "The notion that we would condition Iran not getting nuclear weapons in a verifiable deal on Iran recognizing Israel is really akin to saying that we won't sign a deal unless the nature of the Iranian regime completely transforms," said Obama in NPR.

Israel's requests on the Lausanne agreement
Unspecified reduction in the number of centrifuges.
End to all alleged nuclear military development activity.
Reduce Iran's stockpile of enriched uranium to nil (or ship all the stockpile abroad).
No enrichment to be allowed at Fordow.
Obtain overall picture of all past nuclear research activities within Iran.
Unrestricted inspection of all suspected facilities by the IAEA.
Iranian recognition of Israel's right to exist

== Reactions on social media ==
=== Never threaten an Iranian ===
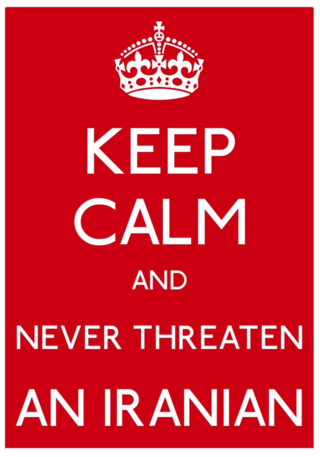
A Keep Calm picture was posted on social media by some Iranian users during the talks, after Javad Zarif's phrase "Never threaten an Iranian".

At 2015 during Iran nuclear deal in Vienna, the reported remarks from Zarif to EU foreign policy chief Federica Mogherini have since trended on Twitter under the hash tag «#NeverThreatenAnIranian».

Also some Iranian media reported that Russian Foreign Minister Sergey Lavrov added at the talks, to joke, that nobody should ever threaten a Russian too. The earlier reports showed that during one heated exchange Javad Zarif shouted at his opposite negotiators: "Never threaten an Iranian!".

Also, The Times of Israel claimed that Zarif warned "West" to "Never threaten an Iranian" at that time.

== See also ==
- Iran nuclear deal framework
- Iran and weapons of mass destruction
- Islamic Revolutionary Guard Corps Aerospace Force
- Timeline of the nuclear program of Iran
- Views on the nuclear program of Iran
- International sanctions against Iran
- Iran–United States relations during the Obama administration

== External links and further reading ==
=== Books ===
- Henry Kissinger (2014). World Order. Penguin Group. ISBN 978-0-698-16572-4.
- Anthony H. Cordesman and Bryan Gold (2014). The Gulf Military Balance. Volume II: The Missile and Nuclear Dimensions. CSIS, Rowman & Littlefield. ISBN 978-1-4422-2793-4.

=== 2015 ===
- "Joint Comprehensive Plan of Action". 14 July 2015. Archived from the original on 26 October 2017.
- Michael Doran (9 July 2015). "Implications Of A Nuclear Agreement With Iran – Testimony". Hudson Institute. Archived from the original on 11 July 2015.
- Bipartisan Group of American Diplomats, Legislators, and Experts (24 June 2015). "Public Statement on U.S. Policy toward the Iran Nuclear Negotiations" (PDF). Washington Institute for Near East Policy. Archived from the original (PDF) on 4 March 2016.
- "A dangerous modesty". The Economist. 6 June 2015.
- Paul N. Schwartz (3 June 2014). "What the Iran Deal Means for Russia" (PDF). Center for Strategic and International Studies. Archived from the original (PDF) on 14 July 2015.
- Eldad J. Pardo (May 2015). "IMPERIAL DREAMS: The Paradox of Iranian Education" (PDF). Institute for Monitoring Peace and Cultural Tolerance in School Education. Archived from the original (PDF) on 21 June 2015.
- Lindsey Graham (29 May 2015). "8 principles for dealing with the Iran nuclear threat". Israel HaYom.
- Robert S. Wistrich (25 April 2015). "Deadly comparisons". The Jerusalem Post.
- Akbar E. Torbat, Iran is Falling into a Nuclear Agreement Trap, 4 May 2015.
- William J. Broad & Sergio Pecanha (April 2015). "A Simple Guide to the Nuclear Negotiations With Iran". The New York Times.
- "367 House Members Send Letter on Iran Nuclear Negotiations to President Obama". U.S. House Committee on Foreign Affairs, Chairman Ed Royce. 23 March 2015.
- "An Open Letter to the Leaders of the Islamic Republic of Iran" (PDF). U.S. Senator Tom Cotton. 9 March 2015. Archived from the original (PDF) on 23 September 2015.
- Simon Henderson and Olli Heinonen (March 2015). "Nuclear Iran: A Glossary of Terms" (PDF). Washington Institute for Near East Policy. Archived from the original (PDF) on 22 January 2016.
- "Testimonies before the U.S. Senate Committee on Armed Services". C-SPAN. 30 January 2015.

=== 2014 ===
- Michael Doran (3 December 2014). "Testimony before the U.S. Senate Foreign Relations Committee" (PDF). Hudson Institute. Archived from the original (PDF) on 4 March 2016.
- J. Matthew McInnis (18 November 2014). "Avoiding a bad nuclear deal with Iran". American Enterprise Institute.
- David Albright (18 November 2014). "Testimony of David Albright before the House Committee on Foreign Affairs" (PDF). Institute for Science and International Security.
- "Implementation of the NPT Safeguards Agreement and relevant provisions of Security Council resolutions in the Islamic Republic of Iran" (PDF). International Atomic Energy Agency. 7 November 2014.
- Olli Heinonen (November 2014). "The Iranian Nuclear Programme: Practical Parameters for a Credible Long-Term Agreement" (PDF). The Henry Jackson Society.
- Blaise Misztal (9 September 2014). "Update on Iran's Nuclear Program: September 2014". Bipartisan Policy Center.
- "Implementation of the NPT Safeguards Agreement and relevant provisions of Security Council resolutions in the Islamic Republic of Iran" (PDF). International Atomic Energy Agency. 5 September 2014.
- "Including Ballistic Missiles in Negotiations with Iran" (PDF). Atlantic Council's South Asia Center. September 2014.
- Orde F. Kittrie, Christopher A. Bidwell; et al. (September 2014). "Verification Requirements for a Nuclear Agreement with Iran" (PDF). Federation of American Scientists. Archived from the original (PDF) on 17 March 2016.
- David Albright, Olli Heinonen & Andrea Stricker (22 July 2014). ""The Six's" Guiding Principles in Negotiating with Iran" (PDF). Institute for Science and International Security.
- Einhorn, Robert (19 July 2014). "A Justified Extension for Iran Nuclear Talks, But Hard Choices Ahead". Brookings Institution. Archived from the original on 24 July 2014.
- Charles S. Robb and Charles F. Wald (17 July 2014). "Evaluating a Nuclear Deal with Iran" (PDF). Bipartisan Policy Center. Archived from the original (PDF) on 11 July 2015.
- "Iran, Country Profiles, Nuclear". Nuclear Threat Initiative. July 2014. Archived from the original on 7 August 2014.
- Graham Allison and Oren Setter (June 2014). "Blocking All Paths to an Iranian Bomb" (PDF). Belfer Center for Science and International Affairs.
- "Solving the Iranian Nuclear Puzzle: Toward a Realistic and Effective Comprehensive Nuclear Agreement" (PDF). Arms Control Association. June 2014. Archived from the original (PDF) on 4 March 2016.
- "Implementation of the NPT Safeguards Agreement and relevant provisions of Security Council resolutions in the Islamic Republic of Iran" (PDF). International Atomic Energy Agency. 23 May 2014.
- David Albright and Bruno Tertrais (14 May 2014). "Making Iran Come Clean About Its Nukes". The Wall Street Journal.
- Gregory S. Jones (13 March 2014). "Iran's Arak Reactor and the Plutonium Bomb". National Review Online.
- Anthony H. Cordesman (17 January 2014). "The P5+1 and Iranian Joint Plan of Action on the Islamic Republic of Iran's Nuclear Program: Assessing the Details and Risks". Center for Strategic and International Studies.
- "Defining Iranian Nuclear Programs in a Comprehensive Solution under the Joint Plan of Action" (PDF). Institute for Science and International Security. 15 January 2014.
- Anthony H. Cordesman and Bryan Gold (January 2014). "The Gulf Military Balance. Volume II: The Missile and Nuclear Dimensions" (PDF). Center for Strategic and International Studies. Archived from the original (PDF) on 31 October 2014.

=== 2013 ===
- "Joint Plan of Action" (PDF). European External Action Service. 24 November 2013.
