= Institute for Science and International Security =

Nonprofit non-governmental organization

- Founded: 1993
- Founder: David Albright
- Type: Think tank
- Purpose: Nuclear nonproliferation
- Location: Washington, D.C.
- Region served: Predominantly the United States
- Key people: David Albright
- Revenue: $538,050 (2022)
- Employees: 4
- Website: www.isis-online.org

The Institute for Science and International Security (ISIS) is a nonprofit, non-governmental institution to inform the public about "science and policy issues affecting international security". Founded in 1993, the group is led by founder and former United Nations IAEA nuclear inspector David Albright, and has been described as specializing "in analyzing the findings" of the IAEA. ISIS focuses primarily on nuclear weapons.

== Board and funding ==
ISIS's board consists of the following members:

- David Albright – chairman/president
- Michael Rietz – treasurer, lawyer, private practice
- Houston Wood – University of Virginia

As of 2011, ISIS has received funding from: Ploughshares Fund, the John D. and Catherine T. MacArthur Foundation, Carnegie Corporation of New York, Colombe Foundation, New-Land Foundation, the Prospect Hill Foundation, United States Institute of Peace, the International Atomic Energy Agency, Ford Foundation, the Scherman Foundation, Smith Richardson Foundation, Compton Foundation, the Stanley Foundation, the John Merck Fund, the Rockefeller Foundation, the Rockefeller Brothers Fund, W. Alton Jones Foundation, the Ministry of Foreign Affairs of Japan, and the United States Department of Energy.

== Staff ==
ISIS's staff consists of the following people:

- David Albright – president and founder
- Sarah Burkhard – research associate
- Spencer Faragasso – research fellow
- Houston Wood – technical consultant
- Frank V. Pabian – consultant
- Ulrike Weinrich – financial director

== Focus and analysis ==
The institute regularly publishes technical analyses of nuclear proliferation programs by examining technical data and satellite imagery. ISIS is cited in non-proliferation circles and in international media regarding its analysis. The majority of the current material produced by ISIS is focused on the analysis and monitoring of the nuclear programs of North Korea, Iran, Pakistan, Syria, and cases of worldwide illicit nuclear trade.

=== Iraq ===
In August 1991, David Albright and Mark Hibbs, writing for the Bulletin of the Atomic Scientists, wrote that there were many technological challenges unsolved with Iraq's nuclear program. Albright and Hibbs wrote that Iraq's nuclear program "was so primitive that the international sanctions put in place after the August 2 invasion may have had more substantive effect than the tons of bombs dropped by U.S. and allied planes five months later".

In an October 2002 report, ISIS said "One of the most significant accomplishments of the intrusive inspections mandated by UN Security Council in 1991 is that Iraq is not believed to have nuclear weapons now. This single accomplishment demonstrates both the power and value of intrusive nuclear inspections in Iraq". The report further argued that "the nuclear inspection process provided a powerful deterrent against Iraq reconstituting its nuclear weapons program until inspectors left in late 1998".

=== Iran ===
ISIS has been following, since the 1990s, the circumstances surrounding the Iranian nuclear program and created a website dedicated to informing readers about the history of Iran's nuclear program and facilities, providing IAEA reports, providing information about diplomatic efforts, and providing technical assessments.

A June 2009 posting by ISIS argued that "we do know that a lasting, military solution to Iran's nuclear program is not realistic. This leaves diplomacy as the best route to bring about a suspension of Iran's uranium enrichment program, regardless of who holds Iran's presidency."

On October 2, 2009 ISIS posted a subject-to-revision working document by IAEA safeguards experts which it described as an "Internal IAEA Document on Alleged Iranian Nuclear Weaponization". The document led media to report that Iran has tested a two-point implosion design. Gordon Oehler, who ran the CIA's nonproliferation center and served as deputy director of the presidential commission on weapons of mass destruction, wrote "if someone has a good idea for a missile program, and he has really good connections, he'll get that program through... But that doesn't mean there is a master plan for a nuclear weapon". Outside experts noted that the parts of the report made public lack many dates associated with Iran's alleged activities. The Washington Post reported that "nowhere are there construction orders, payment invoices, or more than a handful of names and locations possibly connected to the projects". Former IAEA Director Mohamed ElBaradei said the Agency did not have any information suggesting nuclear material has been used and did not have any information suggesting any components of nuclear weapons had been manufactured. Iran asserted that the documents were a fabrication, while the IAEA urged Iran to be more cooperative and urged member states to provide more information about the allegations, to be shared with Iran.

In December 2009, the conservative-leaning The Times, working with ISIS analysis, claimed that a document from an unnamed Asian intelligence agency described the use of a neutron source which has no use other than in a nuclear weapon, and claimed the document appeared to be from an office in Iran's Defense Ministry and may have been from around 2007. The Institute for Science and International Security, said that it “urges caution and further assessment” of the document and noted that "the document does not mention nuclear weapons .. and we have seen no evidence of an Iranian decision to build them.” Western intelligence agencies did not give any authentication to the document, while Russia noted that though the IAEA is in possession of these documents, the IAEA's findings "do not contain any conclusions about the presence of undeclared nuclear activities in Iran". In response to allegations from both Iran and some within the United States that the document was forged, Albright said ISIS felt "that this document does need to be authenticated, and we welcome a debate and actually a collecting [of] information from people, people who've done linguistic analysis, inside information".

In March 2024, based on the report of the ISIS, Foreign Policy considered breakout time at zero. Referring to this report, Foreign Policy spoke about the change in American and European policies towards Iran. Citing examples of oil sales, economic growth, and Iran's military cooperation with other countries, Foreign Policy implicitly talks about the potential possibility of building nuclear weapons and Iran's nuclear deterrent power.

=== Myanmar ===
In a January 28, 2010 report, ISIS found: "There remain sound reasons to suspect that the military regime in Burma might be pursuing a long-term strategy to make nuclear weapons. Despite the public reports to the contrary, the military junta does not appear to be close to establishing a significant nuclear capability. Information suggesting the construction of major nuclear facilities appears unreliable or inconclusive." During an ASEAN meeting in Thailand in July 2009, US secretary of state Hillary Clinton highlighted concerns of the North Korean link. "We know there are also growing concerns about military cooperation between North Korea and Burma which we take very seriously", Clinton said.

== Reception ==
In a 2004 National Journal profile, Gregg Sangillo and Mark Kukis called Albright a "go-to guy for media people seeking independent analysis on Iraq’s [weapons of mass destruction] programs".

In 2006, David Albright received the Joseph A. Burton Forum Award from the American Physical Society, a professional society of American physicists. He was cited for "his tireless and productive efforts to slow the transfer of nuclear weapons technology. He brings a unique combination of deep understanding, objectivity, and effectiveness to this vexed area".

== See also ==
- Arms control
- Arms trafficking
- Conflict Armament Research – similar UK organisation
