= David Albright =

Nuclear non-proliferation expert

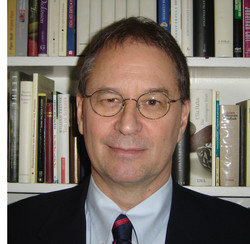
David Albright in 2014

David Albright (born 1951) is an American physicist and a nuclear weapons expert who is the founder of the non-governmental Institute for Science and International Security (ISIS), its current president, and author of several books on proliferation of atomic weapons.

== Early life ==
Albright holds a Master of Science in physics from Indiana University in 1980, Master of Science in mathematics from Wright State University in 1977 and a bachelor of science from Wright State University in 1975. He has taught physics at George Mason University in Virginia.

From 1990 to 2001, Albright was a member of the Colorado State Health Advisory Panel, participating in its assessment of the toxicological and radiological effects on the population near the Rocky Flats atomic weapons production site.

== Work with the IAEA ==
From 1992 to 1997, David Albright was affiliated with the International Atomic Energy Agency's Action Team. In June 1996, he was invited to be the first non-governmental inspector of Iraq's nuclear program and questioned Iraqi officials about that country's uranium enrichment program.

In 2001, Albright prepared an analysis for CNN of documents found in an abandoned al-Qaeda safe house in Kabul believed to have been used by Abu Khabbab, who was described as "Osama bin Laden's top chemical and biological weapons commander". Albright confirmed that the abandoned documents included plans for a nuclear bomb and extensive training notes on the handling of radiological material.

In September 2002, Albright and his organization ISIS were the first to publicly criticize the claims of the George W. Bush administration and the CIA about the notorious Iraqi aluminum tubes that had been intercepted in Jordan. Albright said it was far from clear that the tubes were intended for a uranium centrifuge. The August/September 2003 American Journalism Review stated:

On December 8 [2002] Bob Simon reported on 60 Minutes that the aluminum tubes story was being challenged. He quoted British intelligence officials and David Albright, a weapons inspector in Iraq for the U.N. in the 1990s. Albright said, "People who understood gas centrifuges almost uniformly felt that these tubes were not specific to gas centrifuge use." Simon said to Albright: "It seems that what you're suggesting is that the administration's leak to The New York Times, regarding aluminum tubes, was misleading?" Albright: "Oh, I think it was. I think—I think it was very misleading.".

Albright stated: "If the U.S. government puts out bad information it runs a risk of undermining the good information it possesses. In this case, I fear that the information was put out there for a short-term political goal: to convince people that Saddam Hussein is close to acquiring nuclear weapons."

Albright subsequently exposed flaws in the Bush administration's other so-called nuclear evidence in the run-up to the Iraq war. Prior to the start of the war, he also became sceptical that Iraq had sizeable stocks of chemical and biological weapons.

A National Journal profile in 2004 called Albright a "go-to guy for media people seeking independent analysis on Iraq's [weapons of mass destruction] programs".

In 2006, Albright received the prestigious Joseph A. Burton Forum Award from the American Physical Society, a professional society of American physicists. He was cited "For his tireless and productive efforts to slow the transfer of nuclear weapons technology. He brings a unique combination of deep understanding, objectivity, and effectiveness to this vexed area"

A report by Albright was quoted in a June 15, 2008 article in The Washington Post. He stated in a leaked copy of a draft report (to be released in full the week of June 15, 2008) that a nuclear weapons smuggling ring—which sold bomb-related parts to Libya, North Korea, and Iran—possessed plans to an advanced nuclear device, compact enough to fit on a ballistic missile used by Iran and a dozen other developing countries. It was unknown if these plans had been shared with any regime; and the plans had recently been destroyed.

== Institute for Science and International Security ==
After retiring from the IAEA, Albright founded and is now President of the non-profit Institute for Science and International Security (ISIS) in Washington, D.C. He directs the project work of ISIS, which focuses on nuclear nonproliferation, chairs its board of directors, and heads its fundraising efforts. In addition, he regularly publishes and conducts scientific research. He has written numerous assessments on secret nuclear weapons programs throughout the world.

== See also ==
- South Africa and weapons of mass destruction
