= Anthony Cordesman =

American national security analyst (1939–2024)

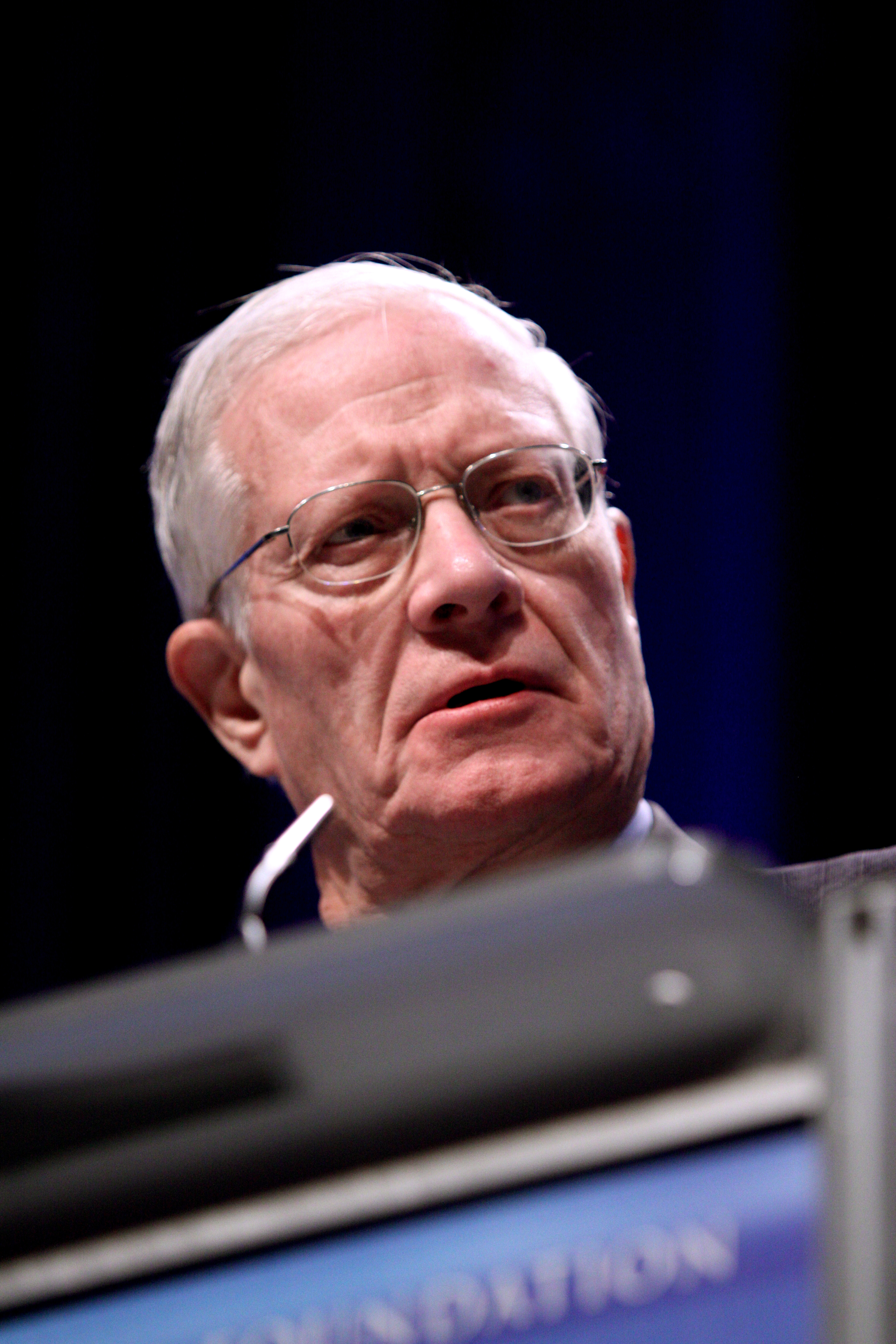
- Cordesman in 2011
- Born: August 2, 1939; Chicago, Illinois, U.S.
- Died: January 29, 2024 (aged 84); Alexandria, Virginia, U.S.
- Education: University of Chicago
- Occupation: National security analyst
- Organization: Center for Strategic and International Studies

Anthony H. Cordesman (August 2, 1939 – January 29, 2024) was an American national security analyst. He held the Arleigh A. Burke Chair in Strategy at the Center for Strategic and International Studies (CSIS) and was a national security analyst of global conflicts.

== Life and career ==
Cordesman earned his B.A. from the University of Chicago (1960), his M.A. from the Fletcher School, Tufts University (1961), and his Ph.D. from the University of London (1963).

At CSIS, he was the director of the Gulf Net Assessment Project and the Gulf in Transition study, and Principal Investigator of the CSIS Homeland Defense Project. He directed the Middle East Net Assessment Program, acted as co-director of the Strategic Energy Initiative, and directed the project on Saudi Arabia Enters the 21st Century. He was the author of a wide range of studies of energy policy, and wrote extensively on oil and energy risks and issues, and is the co-author of The Global Oil Market: Risks and Uncertainties, CSIS, 2006. He was a Professor of National Security Studies at Georgetown University and fellow at the Woodrow Wilson International Center for Scholars at the Smithsonian Institution.

Cordesman served as national security assistant to Senator John McCain of the Senate Armed Services Committee and as civilian assistant to the Deputy Secretary of Defense. He was also a past director of intelligence assessment in the Office of the Secretary of Defense. He directed the analysis of the lessons of the Yom Kippur War for the Secretary of Defense in 1974, coordinating the U.S. military, intelligence, and civilian analysis of the conflict. He was awarded the Department of Defense Distinguished Civilian Service Award.

Cordesman lectured in Asia from the 1960s, and was a senior advisor to the U.S.-Asia Institute. He was a guest lecturer in China on energy and Middle East security for the State Department in 2007. He was the co-author of Chinese Military Modernization: Force Development and Strategic Capabilities, CSIS, Washington, 2007.

Cordesman also served in other government positions at the United States Department of State, Department of Energy, and as director of International Staff at NATO. He carried assignments posts in the United Kingdom, Lebanon, Egypt, Iran, Turkey and West Germany, and worked in Saudi Arabia.

Cordesman authored over 50 books on U.S. security policy, military strategy, energy policy, and the Middle East. He was also a long-term contributor to the American hi-fi magazine, The Absolute Sound.

Cordesman died on January 29, 2024, at the age of 84.

== Gaza War analysis ==
On February 2, 2009, Cordesman published an analysis of the 2008–2009 Israel–Gaza conflict relying on Israeli briefings before and after the conflict, including visits with the IDF Spokesman, interviews with Arab officials and Middle East experts. The report emphasized that Hamas had not provided more than "minimal details on the fighting, other than ideological and propaganda statements". Cordesman pointed out improvements in the capability of the Israel Defense Forces since the fighting against Hezbollah in 2006. He believed the military used "decisive force" against legitimate targets, and that civilian casualties were a byproduct of the fighting due to the tactic of using civilians as "weapons of war."

Cordesman also claimed that Israel did not violate the laws of war but Norman Finkelstein challenged this, stating that Cordesman was relying solely on information from the Israeli Ministry of Defense while ignoring reports from the United Nations, NGOs and other media reports.

== War in Iraq and Afghanistan ==
Cordesman criticized the Bush administration's efforts in both the Iraq and Afghanistan wars. According to an article in National Business Review, Cordesman was said to have been only "48 per cent" convinced on the need to invade Iraq in 2003, but contended that "concerns over Saddam's weapons of mass destruction were valid". He argued that the chaos in Iraq was the result of "pre-existing fractures in the country's social makeup", and a "tribal, clan-based society" and not due to a foreign invasion that destroyed the preexisting order.

== Iraqi Security Forces: A Strategy for Success ==
In 2006, Cordesman published Iraqi Security Forces: A Strategy for Success, documenting "both the initial mistakes and the recent changes in U.S. policy that now offer real hope of success in Iraq".

== Israeli attack on Iran's nuclear program ==
In March 2009, Cordesman issued a detailed assessment entitled "Study on a Possible Israeli Strike on Iran's Nuclear Development Facilities". He concludes with the opinion that "Any realistic resolution to the Iranian nuclear program will require an approach that encompasses Military, Economic, Political interests and differences of the West vs Iran. There will be no lasting resolution to the Iranian nuclear program until the broader interests of Iran, the US, the region and the world are addressed. Iran should be engaged directly by the U.S. with an agenda open to all areas of military and non-military issues that both are in agreement or disagreement."

== Published works ==
- The Military Balance in the Middle East. Bloomsbury Publishing USA, 2004.
- A Tragedy of Arms: Military and Security Developments in the Maghreb, Greenwood Publishing Group, 2002

Cordesman's books include a four-volume series on the lessons of modern war. His works in 2006-07 included Iraq’s Insurgency and the Road to Civil Conflict (Praeger, 2007), Lessons of the 2006 Israeli-Hezbollah War (CSIS, 2007), Iran’s Military Forces and Warfighting Capabilities (Praeger/CSIS, 2007), Iraqi Force Development (CSIS, 2007), Salvaging American Defense (Praeger/CSIS, 2007), and Chinese Military Modernization (CSIS, 2007).
