= 2021 Natanz incident =

Suspected attack on a nuclear site in Natanz, Iran

Coordinates: 33°30′26″N 51°54′49″E

The 2021 Natanz incident (Persian: حادثه ۱۴۰۰ نطنز; Hādese-ye 1400 Natanz) was an attack on the Natanz Nuclear Facility in Iran on 11 April 2021, widely attributed to the Israeli Mossad. Located in the Isfahan province of Central Iran, the facility was Iran's longtime main enrichment site. The incident involved a remotely detonated explosive device that destroyed the facility's independent power supply and caused a large-scale blackout, damaging thousands of centrifuges.

The attack occurred during a period of renewed diplomacy in Vienna aimed at reviving the Joint Comprehensive Plan of Action (JCPOA), which the United States had unilaterally withdrawn from in 2018. While intended to delay Iran's nuclear progress, the incident led Iran to restrict the access of International Atomic Energy Agency (IAEA) inspectors, and to significantly escalate its enrichment levels. These nuclear advances eventually contributed to the collapse of regional diplomacy and subsequent United States and Israeli attacks of 2025 and 2026.

== Background ==
Iran suspended its AMAD Project pursuant to Ali Khamenei's fatwa against nuclear weapons in 2003. Khamenei banned nuclear weapons of any kind. Iran said it was not seeking nuclear weapons, and that its enrichment efforts were to generate nuclear power for civilian use. UN Security Council (UNSC) concerns about Iran's nuclear program from 2006 (Note: The problems indicated by the UNSC during 2006 in their first resolution were specifically "uranium enrichment and reprocessing" in the second resolution of that year; additionally use or attempted use of "heavy water".) led to the JCPOA nuclear deal between Iran and the US in 2015. Despite Iran's compliance with the JCPOA, Trump withdrew the US from the deal in 2018, re-imposed sanctions, and adopted a "maximum pressure" strategy. The Biden administration kept these sanctions in place, further damaging Iran's economy. Following the 2018 US withdrawal from the agreement, analysts in the UK and US have increasingly characterized Iran’s strategy as nuclear hedging, developing the technical infrastructure to assemble a weapon on short notice while stopping short of actual production.

In 2010, Operation Olympic Games, an unacknowledged US and Israeli campaign of cyber disruption directed at Iranian nuclear facilities, used a sophisticated computer virus called Stuxnet to disrupt Iran's uranium enrichment at the Natanz nuclear facility. Over several years, Olympic Games altered the computer code of Iran’s industrial equipment, destroying around 1000 centrifuges and setting back Iran's nuclear program a year or more.

In June 2020, a fire damaged centrifuges at the Natanz facility. Sources in the Middle East and the West, quoted by The New York Times, attributed the fire not to a cyberattack, but a bomb planted in the facility by Israel. Amid ongoing sanctions, and in response to the assassination of Mohsen Fakhrizadeh, the Iranian parliament passed a law in December 2020 mandating the Iranian administration to enrich uranium to 20% purity, breaking the 3.67% limit under the JCPOA. Iran repeatedly said those measures would be reversed as soon as the United States provided sanctions relief, including those the United States had been obligated to reverse under the JCPOA.

In April 2021, just days before the incident, the European Union convened indirect talks between Iran and the United States in Vienna, with the goal of readmitting the United States into the nuclear deal and ensuring Iran's cooperation. Britain, France, Germany, China and Russia also participated, with the latter two blaming the United States' withdrawal from the JCPOA and failure to lift sanctions as the root cause of the diplomatic impasse. Israel strongly opposed the talks.

== Incident ==
On 9 April 2021, in a ceremony at the Natanz Nuclear Facility broadcast by state television as part of Iran's National Nuclear Technology Day, Iranian president Hassan Rouhani inaugurated a cascade 164 IR-6 centrifuges for producing enriched uranium, as well as two test cascades, 30 each of IR-5 and IR-6S models. On 11 April 2021, a remotely detonated bomb caused a massive explosion at the facility, damaging the electrical distribution grid, destroying the independently protected power supply to the centrifuges, and resulting in a blackout. Much of the aboveground facility was destroyed, with the blast ripping doors from their hinges and collapsing parts of the roof. Other parts of the facility were blackened by the subsequent fire. There were no reported casualties.

== Aftermath ==
There were contradictory reports of the cause of incident, including a cyberattack, industrial accident, or explosive sabotage. US and Israeli intelligence officials initially attributed it to an Israeli cyberattack, with Israeli media outlets saying the operation was carried out by Mossad, but later Iranian and Western reports concluded it was an explosive device planted at the site. By 17 April, Iran ruled out a cyberattack as the cause, identifying a 43-year-old man named Reza Karimi as the suspected saboteur. According to Iran, 300 pounds of explosives were smuggled into the facility in equipment that had been sent abroad for repair. Israel refused to publicly confirm responsibility, and Iran blamed Israel for the attack.

=== Damage ===
Behrouz Kamalvandi, the Atomic Energy Organization of Iran spokesman, said that the incident caused no casualties nor pollution. Alireza Zakani, head of the Iranian parliament's Research Centre, said that the incident eliminated Iran's ability to enrich, and suggested it damaged several thousand centrifuges.

=== Reconstruction ===
On November 17, 2021, the IAEA released their quarterly safeguards report regarding verification and monitoring in the Islamic Republic of Iran, in light of United Nations Security Council resolution 2231 (2015). The report concluded that the number of enriching IR-1 cascades and IR-2m cascades at Natanz appeared to have almost fully recovered from the April sabatoge. Iran installed 31 cascades of IR-1 centrifuges, six cascades of IR-2m centrifuges, and two cascades of IR-4 centrifuges at the site. Of those, as of November 13, 28 IR-1 cascades, six IR-2m cascades, and two IR-4 cascades were being fed with uranium.

== Reactions ==
Ali Akbar Salehi, the head of the Atomic Energy Organization of Iran (AEOI) said that the incident was an act of sabotage and "nuclear terrorism", and said it showed that opponents of Iran's industrial and political progress failed to prevent significant development of its nuclear industry. President Rouhani said that Iran would replace the old centrifuges with more advanced ones, and vowed to again increase enrichment levels.

Mohammad Javad Zarif, the foreign minister of Iran, in a letter to the Secretary-General of the United Nations, Antonio Guterres, described the Natanz attack as a war crime due to the high risk of potential release of radioactive material, stating that "any power with knowledge of, or acquiescence in, this act must also be held accountable as an accomplice to this war crime." Attacking nuclear facilities can be a war crime under international law. Standing by Russian foreign minister Sergei Lavrov in a joint press conference, Zarif further condemned Israel for two attacks on Natanz in one year.

Of the ongoing diplomatic efforts in Vienna, European Union officials said it endangered efforts to bring the United States and Iran back into compliance with the JCPOA, and warned against efforts to undermine the talks, which ultimately stalled. In reaction to the incident, Iran restricted UN nuclear inspectors' access to Natanz, citing security concerns, and, true to Rouhani's word, increased the levels of its uranium enrichment from 20% to 60% purity.

== See also ==
- 2020 Iran explosions
- 2023 Iran drone attacks
- Iran–Israel proxy conflict
- United States withdrawal from the Joint Comprehensive Plan of Action
