= Iranian involvement in the Russo-Ukrainian war (2022–present) =

Iran has supported Russia both diplomatically and militarily since the beginning of the Russo-Ukrainian war in February 2022. It has voted against United Nations resolutions condemning Russia and has regularly delivered loitering munitions, chiefly the Shahed 131 and Shahed 136, to the Russian military. Several countries have accused Iran of violating United Nations Security Council Resolution 2231, which was adopted with full support of the sitting members in July 2015 and seeks to inspect the Iranian nuclear program in preparation for ending United Nations sanctions against Iran. Additionally, Ukraine and the United States, among others, have stated that Iran's Islamic Revolutionary Guard Corps (IRGC) has had a presence in Russian-occupied Crimea for the purpose of operating Shahed drones in attacks against Ukrainian cities. Some of these IRGC personnel have reportedly been killed by Ukrainian military strikes against Russian-occupied territory; the Iranian involvement in the war has negatively impacted Iran–Ukraine relations while intensifying existing tensions between Iran and the United States.

== Background ==
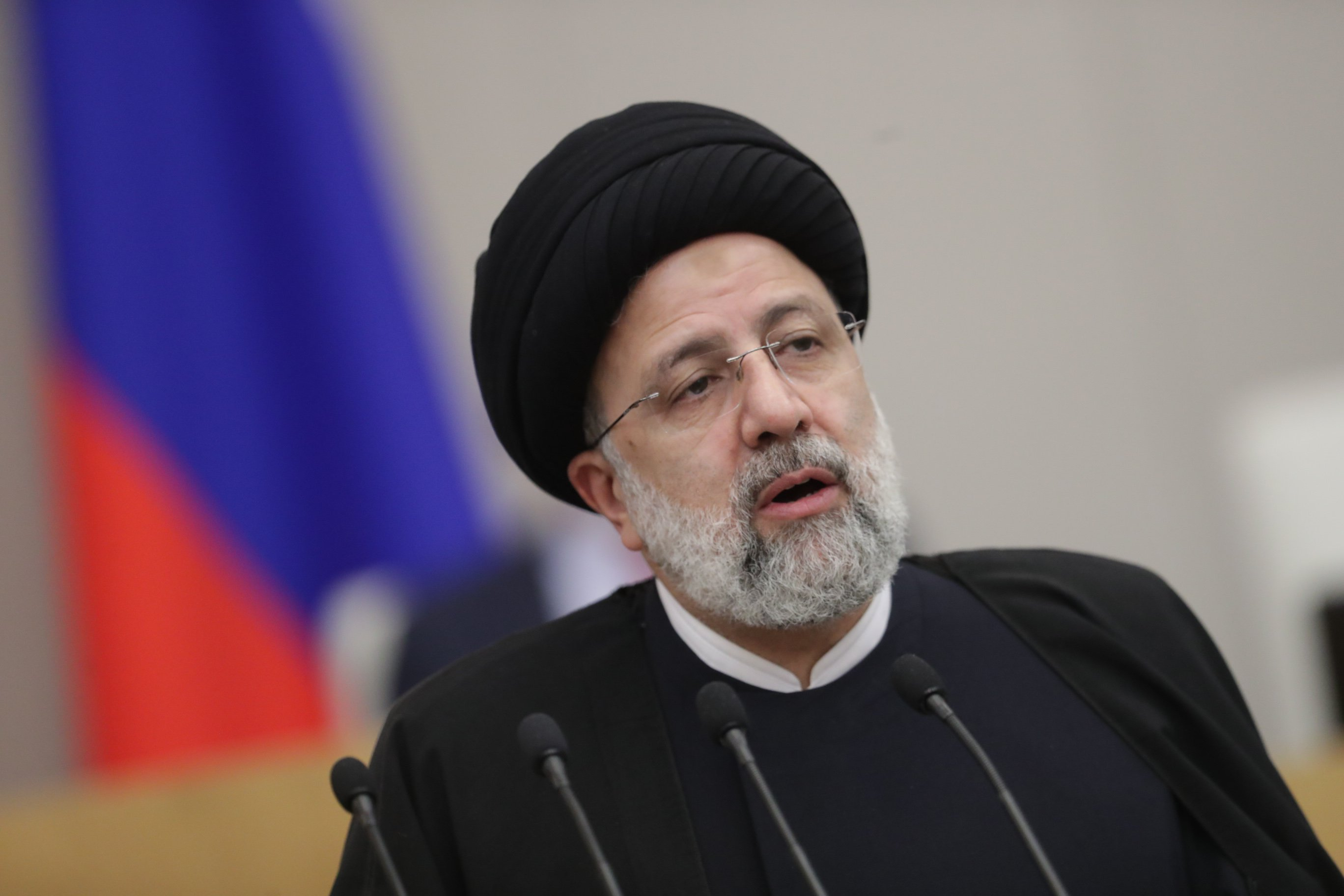
Iranian President Ebrahim Raisi speaking to the Russian State Duma on 20 January 2022

The United Nations Security Council Resolution 2231 enacted an arms embargo on Iran in 2015. The embargo on conventional Iranian arms ended in October 2020, but the restrictions on Iran regarding missiles and related technologies were in place until October 2023.

On 20 January 2022, Ebrahim Raisi, the president of Iran gave a speech to the Russian Duma. In the speech, he condemned NATO, accusing it of "infiltrating various geographical areas with new coverings that threaten the common interests of independent states" and emphasized the relations between Iran and Russia.

In September 2025, the UN reimposed sanctions on Iran through the "snapback" mechanism, freezing Iranian assets abroad, halting arms transactions, and imposing penalties related to the country's ballistic-missile program. Snapback sanctions were rejected by China and Russia.

== Iranian weapons deliveries to Russia ==
On 24 February 2022, Russia invaded Ukraine. By 12 April, Russia's attempt to take Kyiv had failed. On that date, The Guardian reported that Iran was smuggling weapons from Iraq to Russia. On 11 July, and again on 17 July, with Russian drone supplies running low, US officials said that Iran was planning to provide Russia with drones. By 17 October, with Russia losing ground to Ukrainian counteroffensives in the East and in the South, Russia had obtained Iranian suicide drones, which it used to attack civilian infrastructure. By 18 October, Iranian military officials were in Crimea helping Russia to operate Iranian drones.

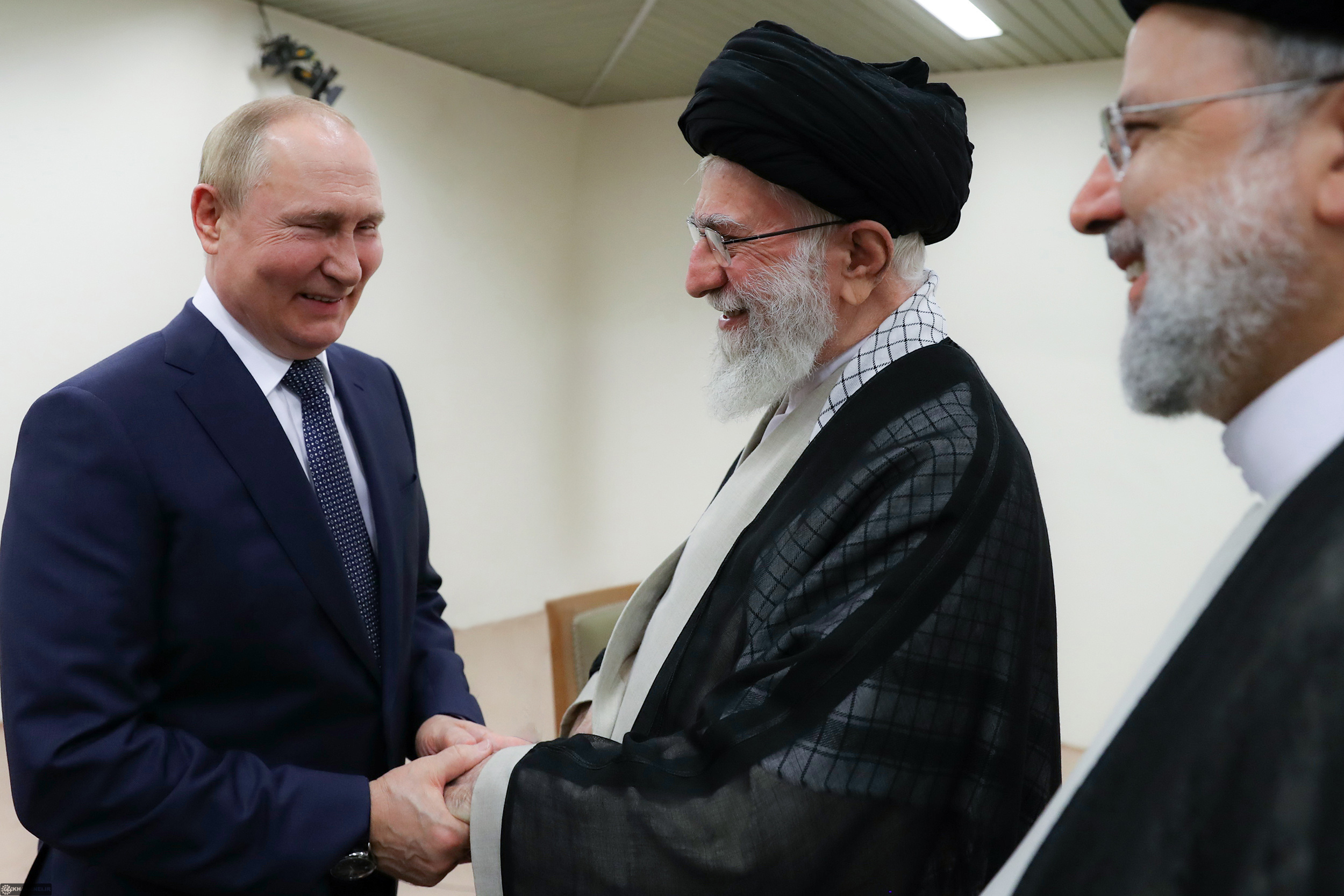
Russian President Vladimir Putin meeting with Iranian Supreme Leader Ali Khamenei and Iranian President Ebrahim Raisi in Tehran, 19 July 2022

On 16 October, The Washington Post reported that Iran was planning to supply Russia with both drones and missiles. On 21 November, the Ukrainian defense ministry said that according to reports in the Israeli press, Israel might respond by transferring short-range and medium-range missiles to Ukraine.

On 18 October the U.S. State Department accused Iran of violating United Nations Security Council Resolution 2231 by selling Shahed 131 and Shahed 136 drones to Russia, agreeing with similar assessments by France and the United Kingdom. Iran's ambassador to the UN responded by writing to the UNSC on 19 and 24 October stating that this was an erroneous interpretation of paragraph 4 of annex B of the resolution, which clearly states it applies to items that "could contribute to the development of nuclear weapon delivery systems", which these drones could not. Iran denied sending arms for use in the Ukraine war. On 22 October France, Britain and Germany formally called for an investigation by the UN team responsible for UNSCR 2231. The OWADs, particularly the Shahed136/Geran-2, have been a crucial component of Russia's air attacks against Ukraine as of September 2022. Between September 13, 2022 and October 21, 2022, Russia launched 162 Shahed OWADs against Ukraine.

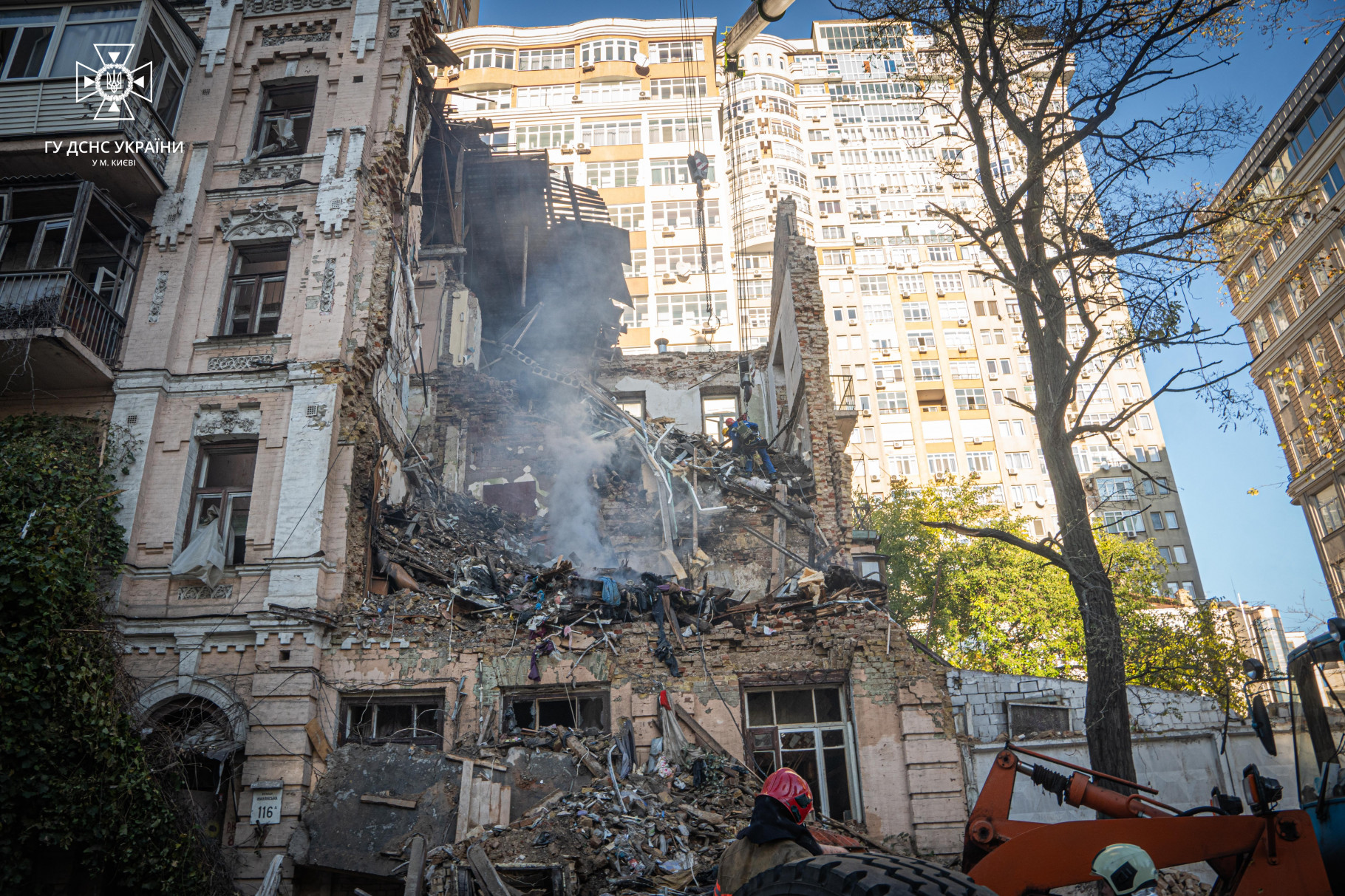
Kyiv after a Russian attack with Iranian drones on 17 October 2022

On 1 November, CNN reported that Iran was preparing to send ballistic missiles and other weapons to Russia for use in Ukraine.

On 21 November, CNN reported that an intelligence assessment had concluded that Iran planned to help Russia begin production of Iran-designed drones in Russia. The country making the intelligence assessment was not named. As of November 2022, Russia had stated it ordered between 2000 and 2400 drones from Iran, although exact Iranian production figures were unknown at the time. The Russian defense industry decided to establish its own licensed production lines for the drones. The drones have been highly useful in targeting and destroying Ukrainian electricity distribution power grids and power-generated capacities. For Russia, the cost of the drones relative to their utility has proven useful in hindering some of Ukraine's capabilities. According to the Washington Institute, Russia is using Iran's drones that are "significantly cheaper single-use drones that can do much of what a cruise missile can do but are smaller, more cost-friendly and deployed in larger numbers. Their use shows us the future of swarming and slow-burning attritional war, in which a defense is ground down over time because attack is simply so much cheaper."

Iran has reportedly supplied Russia with short-range ballistic missiles, escalating their military support in the Ukraine war.

In addition to supplying drones, Iran has trained thousands of Russian personnel to operate the drones. This includes hundreds of Russian pilots, communications specialists, technicians, and handlers. Iran has also established specialized mobile command-and-control communications stations to assist Russia with efficiently using the drones across the vast space of Ukraine. A "relatively large" number of engineers and technicians have also accompanied the drones to Russia to handle equipment issues. Prior to the war, Russia has had a history of underperforming drones in their military; the Russian indigenous drone fleet was "light and small", with low range and limited flight capacity. The initiation of the Ukraine war in February 2022 put them in dire need of various types of drones, including bombers, suicide (kamikaze) drones, and surveillance drones. Iran's provision of more advanced and versatile drones was therefore a great benefit to Russia in its military actions in Ukraine.

Through a billion-dollar weapons deal with Iran, Russia is aiming to domestically produce 6,000 drones. These are variants of the Shahed 136 drone, although customized. The supply of Iranian drones in addition to the targeted domestic weapons productins with Iran's assistance indicates, according to scholars, that this strategic relationship will have implications beyond this specific Ukraine conflict.

=== Russia's Iranian drone attacks ===
External videos
- Russia parades drones Victory Day event -Al-Arabiya English

Russia used Iranian Shahed 136 drones in an attack on Kyiv on 17 October 2022, during which 4 civilians were killed, including one woman who was six months pregnant. Another Russian attack using Iranian drones took place on 28 May 2023. Ukraine said it shot down all but one of the drones, but one person was killed. Another strike on 20 June used 35 Iranian-designed Shahed drones, 32 of which were claimed to be shot down by Ukraine. On 22 November 2024, Russia attacked a residential area in Sumy, Ukraine, using Shahed drones. Two civilians were killed in the attack and 12 were injured. On 17 May 2025, Russia conducted multiple attacks across Ukraine involving Shahed drones, killing at least 13 civilians and injuring 32.

=== Ukrainian response ===
On 3 November 2022, Ukraine warned Iran to expect an "absolutely ruthless" response if it were to continue supplying weapons to Russia. On 24 November, Ukraine announced that Iranian military advisers had been killed in Crimea. It said that Iranians in occupied territory would continue to be targeted.

On 24 May 2023, President of Ukraine Volodymyr Zelenskyy appealed to the people of Iran to oppose the Iran government, asking them not to be complicit with being on the same side "with such an evil as Russian aggression."

On 2 February 2026, Ukraine designated Iran's Islamic Revolutionary Guard Corps (IRGC) as a terrorist organization, also citing Iranian support for Russia and Iran's violent crackdown on protestors during the 2025–2026 Iranian protests.

Throughout the course of war, Ukraine has been facing challenges tackling Iranian Shahed drones used by Russia. The American air defense systems in Ukrainian possession are not suitable for identifying the small drone targets, while the radar-guided systems that are most useful is shooting down drones only exist in small numbers, thus not providing sufficient coverage for defending the country from Russian drone attacks.

== Iranian troops in Russian-occupied Crimea ==
On 21 October 2022, a White House press release stated that Iranian troops were in Crimea assisting Russia in launching drone attacks against civilians and civilian infrastructure. On 24 November, Ukrainian officials said the military had killed ten Iranians and would target any further Iranian military presence in Ukraine. The Institute for the Study of War assessed that these are likely Islamic Revolutionary Guard Corps or IRGC-affiliated personnel, as this formation is the primary operator of Iranian drones.

== Impact on Iran–United States relations ==
Iran's support for Russia, combined with Iranian suppression of the Mahsa Amini protests, and moves towards increased uranium enrichment, has led to a more confrontational relationship between the United States and Iran. As of 24 November 2022, the United States was not looking to revive any nuclear deal with Iran and had recently imposed additional sanctions on Iran.

On 9 January 2023, US National Security Adviser Jake Sullivan said that Iran's sale of drones to Russia might be "contributing to widespread war crimes" in Ukraine. Sullivan said that the US would look into holding Iran's leadership to account.

The sophistication of Iranian drones combined with its supplying to Russia has caused the United States to pursue an accelerated production strategy in manufacturing lightweight, versatile drones, similar to Shaheds, in order to keep up for future uses. This conflict therefore has implications on relations between the United States and Iran beyond merely the Russo-Ukrainian war.

== Global impact ==
Scholars have argued Iran's participation and support of Russia in the Ukraine war has strengthened Iran's role as a military power, and most especially, as one of the world's big international weapons suppliers. This has provided Iran with a source of income and geopolitical influence as an isolated country, providing a way for the country to find relief from financial restrictions imposed by the United States. The income from their support to Russia will assist with the development of new weapons and further pave the way for Iran to compete with other regional arms suppliers such as Turkey and Israel, on the international scale. Iran's low-cost Shahed drones have also created a global market for low-cost, high performing versatile drones that can be used in attritional combat scenarios. Shahed series drones appear to cost approximately US$20,000, whereas air-to-air missiles or ground-based interceptors cost between US$400,000 to US$1.2 million each. Through the provision of drones to Russia, Iran has also expanded its global market share, gaining credibility for its military technology, along with increased reputation on the global scene.

Prior to the Russo-Ukrainian war, Iran's primary drone customers were militias, including its militias. However, because of this war, Iran's drone supplying customers have shifted and expanded to include other nation-states like Russia, who purchase drones in larger supply. The Russian demand for large quantities of drones and loitering munitions has significantly expanded the Iranian market demand. The sophistication and dissemenation of these drones in the global military marketplace, most notably seen in this Russian case, are theorized by scholars to go beyond this specific conflict and cause Western powers to begin more advanced drone developments to keep up:

Just as with Western support for Ukraine, the Iranian drone build-up will have implications that go beyond this specific conflict. Iranian drones are increasing not only in number, but also sophistication and lethality, a development that concerns the United States and Europe. In response, we can expect Western actors to prioritise the production and export of low-cost defence systems able to counter the mass-produced drones directed by Iran, Iranian proxies, and other adversaries.

== See also ==
- Foreign involvement in the Russo-Ukrainian war
- United States and the Russian invasion of Ukraine
