= Pickaxe Mountain =

Mountain in Iran housing a suspected nuclear facility

- Persian: کوه کلنگ‌گزلا, romanized: Kūh-e Kolang Gaz Lā
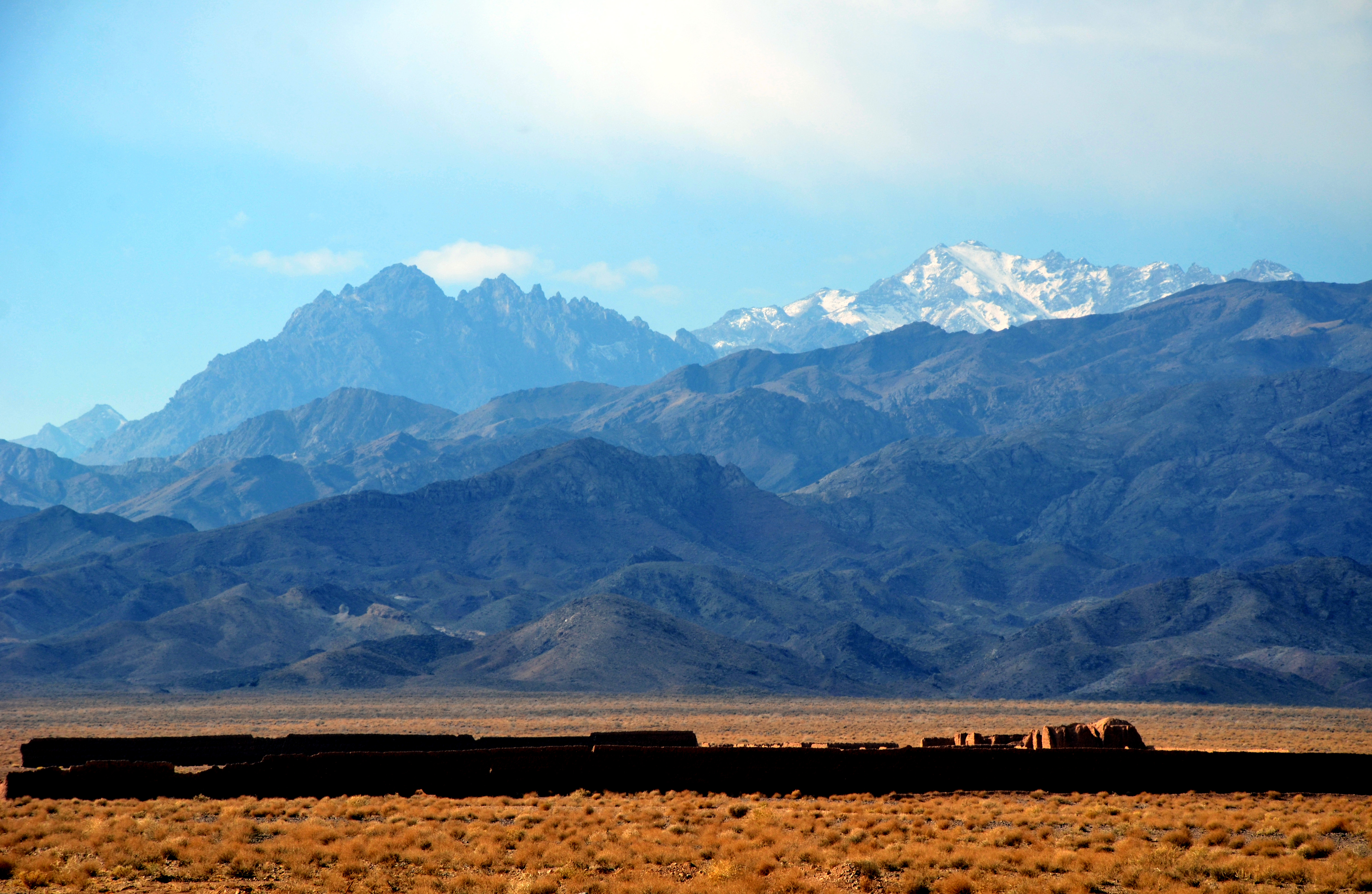
- Mountain is located among the Karkas Mountains in Natanz County

Highest point
- Elevation: 1,608 m (5,276 ft)
- Coordinates: 33°42′18″N 51°42′36″E

Geography
- Location: Isfahan province, Iran
- Country: Iran
- Parent range: Zagros Mountains

Pickaxe Mountain (Persian: کوه کلنگ‌گزلا, romanized: Kūh-e Kolang Gaz Lā) is a mountain in the Karkas Mountains in Isfahan province, Iran, about 1.5 kilometres (1 mi) south of the Natanz nuclear complex. Iran has been excavating a deep underground facility into the mountain that is widely believed to be connected to the country's nuclear program. The site drew international attention in 2026 when U.S. president Donald Trump repeatedly threatened to attack the underground facility located there during the 2026 Iran war.

== Name ==
The mountain's Persian name, Kūh-e Kolang, literally means "pickaxe mountain", which is the origin of the English name used in Western media and analytical reports. Its fuller designation is Kūh-e Kolang Gaz Lā. The name is not necessarily an official or widely used Iranian designation for the site.

== Location and geology ==
Pickaxe Mountain lies in the Zagros range roughly 1.5 km (1 mi) south of the Natanz enrichment complex in Isfahan province. Its above-ground footprint covers approximately one square kilometre of mountainside. Unlike most of the surrounding range, which is sedimentary, the mountain is composed of hard, dense granite, which gives any works tunnelled beneath it substantial natural protection.

== Underground facility ==
After the 2020 explosions near Natanz, Ali Akbar Salehi, then head of the Atomic Energy Organization of Iran, said that Iran would build a "more modern, spacious and comprehensive" facility inside a mountain near Natanz. Based on satellite imagery, excavation at Pickaxe Mountain began in the autumn of 2020 and intensified in 2021.

Iran has stated that the site is intended for the "production and assembly of advanced centrifuges", though inspectors have not been granted full access to verify its purpose. Some analysts have suggested it could instead be used for the secure storage of enriched uranium or for covert enrichment. The main halls are believed to be dug more than 100 metres (330 ft) beneath the granite, and the complex features two pairs of tunnel entrances, one to the east and one to the west. As of mid 2026, satellite analysis indicated that the facility was not yet operational but that construction was continuing.

== 2026 threats ==
Pickaxe Mountain was left untouched during earlier strikes on Iranian nuclear sites in June 2025 and in 2026. In July 2026, during the 2026 Iran war, Trump repeatedly said that the United States would target the site, stating that it would be hit "pretty soon" and "very heavily". Weapons experts questioned whether even the 30,000-pound (14,000 kg) GBU-57 Massive Ordnance Penetrator—the largest conventional bunker-buster in the U.S. arsenal—could destroy a facility built at such depth and beneath granite.

On 21 July 2026, Israeli intelligence officials assessed that Iran may have moved some of its enriched uranium to the site. Iranian officials warned against any attack; Mehdi Mohammadi, an adviser to the speaker of parliament, described Pickaxe Mountain as "the most heavily fortified nuclear facility in the world" and warned that a strike on it would "turn the region into hell".

On 1 November, 2026, right wing political commentator Tucker Carlson claimed that the site is the target of a potential future nuclear strike by the Trump administration.

== See also ==
- Nuclear program of Iran
