= Snapback mechanism of sanctions against Iran =

Conditional UN sanctions on Iran

The snapback mechanism of sanctions against Iran is a diplomatic and legal process established under United Nations Security Council Resolution 2231 (2015), which endorsed the Joint Comprehensive Plan of Action (JCPOA). It enables the automatic reimposition, commonly known as the "snapback", of previously lifted UN sanctions on Iran in response to a significant breach of the nuclear agreement. This mechanism, and the overall mandate of UNSCR 2231, was set to expire on October 18, 2025, ten years after Adoption Day, unless activated before that date.

International concern over Iran's nuclear program led to multiple U.N. Security Council sanctions between 2006 and 2010, targeting Iran's nuclear and missile activities, arms transactions, and related financial networks. These pressures, alongside diplomatic outreach, culminated in 2015 the JCPOA between Iran and the P5+1 (China, France, Russia, the UK, the U.S., plus Germany). The JCPOA imposed strict limits and monitoring on Iran's nuclear program in exchange for broad sanctions relief. To reassure Iran that sanctions relief would not be arbitrarily reversed, the JCPOA and U.N. Security Council Resolution 2231 set a schedule for lifting U.N. sanctions and allowed certain restrictions (like the arms embargo and missile restrictions) to expire automatically after set periods. At the same time, negotiators built in an emergency “snapback” mechanism as a safeguard for the deal's enforcers: if Iran were to violate its commitments, sanctions could be swiftly reimposed without the risk of a veto in the Security Council. This snapback provision, described as an unprecedented diplomatic tool, helped secure support for the JCPOA by ensuring that any “significant non-performance” by Iran could be met with a rapid restoration of international sanctions. The U.N. Security Council unanimously endorsed the JCPOA through Resolution 2231 on July 20, 2015, incorporating this mechanism into international law.

On August 28, 2025, E3 members, France, Germany, and the United Kingdom, initiated the process of the snapback mechanism, stating that despite upholding their own commitments, since 2019 Iran had "increasingly and deliberately ceased performing its JCPOA commitments", including "the accumulation of a highly enriched uranium stockpile which lacks any credible civilian justification and is unprecedented for a state without a nuclear weapons program".

On 28 September 2025, UN sanctions were officially reimposed on Iran. Snapback sanctions were rejected by China and Russia.

== History ==
=== The Non-proliferation treaty ===
Iran was one of the 52 original signatories of the Non-Proliferation Treaty (NPT) in July 1968, under which Iran is a non-nuclear-weapon state. The treaty obligates its non-nuclear-weapon state parties to refrain from acquiring or manufacturing nuclear weapons or from seeking or receiving assistance in the manufacture of nuclear weapons. It requires all non-nuclear-weapon state parties to accept International Atomic Energy Agency (IAEA) safeguards to verify that their nuclear activities serve only peaceful purposes.

In the late 1990s, Iran initiated a covert nuclear weapons program known as the Amad Plan, with the goal of developing a nuclear arsenal. The program was to produce five nuclear warheads by 2004. Led by Mohsen Fakhrizadeh, the plan involved acquisition of foreign nuclear weapon designs, the testing of conventional explosives and experiments in casting and machining using surrogate materials. Iran also conducted studies on integrating the warheads with its Shahab-3 missile system. However, the program lacked weapons-grade uranium or plutonium, which are essential for building functional nuclear weapons.

In the summer of 2002, it was discovered that Iran had secretly constructed the Natanz uranium enrichment plant, capable of producing weapons-grade uranium, and the Arak heavy water reactor, able to manufacture weapons-grade plutonium. In 2003 Iran was found in non-compliance with its NPT safeguards agreement, and in November of that same year, IAEA Director General Mohamed ElBaradei reported that Iran had repeatedly and over an extended period failed to meet its safeguards obligations under the NPT, and did not report the nuclear materials it imported or its processing of nuclear materials, nor did it declare the facilities it built for the processing and storage of nuclear materials.

Following two years of EU3-led diplomatic efforts and Iran temporarily suspending its enrichment program, the IAEA Board of Governors, acting under Article XII.C of the IAEA Statute, found in a rare non-consensus decision with 12 abstentions that these failures constituted non-compliance with the IAEA safeguards agreement. This was reported to the UN Security Council in 2006, concluding in a resolution demanding that Iran suspend its enrichment, passed by the security council. Instead, Iran resumed its enrichment program. In that same year, during a negotiation with Europe, Hassan Rouhani, reportedly acknowledged that Iran had used the diplomatic process to its advantage, stating that, during the talks, the country succeeded in mastering uranium yellowcake conversion at the Isfahan facility.

The IAEA verified the non-diversion of declared nuclear material in Iran, and is continued its work on verifying the absence of undeclared activities. In February 2008, the IAEA also reported that it was working to address "alleged studies" of weaponization, based on documents provided by certain Member States, which those states claimed originated from Iran. Iran rejected the allegations as "baseless" and the documents as "fabrications". In June 2009, the IAEA reported that Iran had not "cooperated with the Agency in connection with the remaining issues ... which need to be clarified to exclude the possibility of military dimensions to Iran's nuclear program."

The United States concluded that Iran violated its Article III NPT safeguards obligations, and further argued based on circumstantial evidence that Iran's enrichment program was for weapons purposes and therefore violated Iran's Article II nonproliferation obligations. The November 2007 US National Intelligence Estimate (NIE) later concluded with "only moderate" confidence, that Iran had halted a nuclear weapons program in the fall of 2003 "primarily in response to increasing international scrutiny and pressure resulting from exposure of [its] previously undeclared nuclear work", with "moderate" confidence that it "probably would be technically capable of producing enough highly enriched uranium for a weapon sometime during the 2010-2015 time frame [with a lower level of confidence for weapon amounts of reprocessed plutonium in that time]", and had not restarted those activities as of mid 2007, represented "a halt to [its] entire nuclear weapons program."

=== The Joint Comprehensive Plan of Action ===
In 2013, under U.S. president Barack Obama, secret negotiations between Iran and the U.S. took place in Oman, and on 24 November of that same year, the temporary Joint Plan of Action agreement was signed between Iran and P5+1. As was required from the JPOA, Iran halted the enrichment of Uranium to 20%, and the construction of the Arak heavy water reactor. It also began diluting its stockpile of enriched uranium to no more than 3.5%, in return for sanctions relief.

By 2015 the JPOA was expanded and culminated in the Joint Comprehensive Plan of Action (JCPOA). According to this extended version, Iran was to drastically reduce the number of its low-yield centrifuges (IR-1) to 5,060 for 10 years, to refrain from enrichment beyond 3.57%, to refrain from enrichment in Fordow and to reduce its stockpile of enriched uranium to no more than 300 kg for 15 years. Additionally, Iran was to submit itselt to extensive and multi-layered monitoring conducted by the IAEA, which was to have full access to all nuclear sites. In return for Iranian compliance, P5+1 committed to remove all U.N. security council sanctions against Iran, as well as most of those advanced by the E.U. and some by the U.S. Adoption of the JCPOA coincided with the adoption of U.N. Security Council resolution 2231, which dictated that previous U.N. sanctions would be suspended for five years and which introduced the "Snapback" mechanism. After 15 years, all limits on enrichment would be removed, including limits on the type and number of centrifuges, Iran's stocks of enriched uranium, and enrichment sites. According to the Belfer guide on the Iran nuclear deal, at this point Iran could "expand its nuclear program to create more practical overt and covert nuclear weapons options".

In 2018, the Mossad reportedly retrieved "50,000 pages and 163 compact discs of memos, videos and plans" belonging to the secret Amad nuclear weapons program, proving that Iran had continued to develop the program even after it claimed to have suspended it. Later that year, the U.S. withdrew from the JCPOA, and president Donald Trump stated that "the heart of the Iran deal was a giant fiction: that a murderous regime desired only a peaceful nuclear energy program", reinstating all U.S. sanctions on Iran.

In February 2019, the IAEA certified that Iran was still abiding by the international Joint Comprehensive Plan of Action (JCPOA) of 2015. However, on 8 May 2019, Iran announced it would suspend implementation of some parts of the JCPOA, threatening further action in 60 days unless it received protection from US sanctions. In July 2019, the IAEA confirmed that Iran had breached both the 300 kg enriched uranium stockpile limit and the 3.67% refinement limit. On 5 November 2019, Iranian nuclear chief Ali Akbar Salehi announced that Iran would enrich uranium to 5% at the Fordow Fuel Enrichment Plant, adding that the country had the capability to enrich uranium to 20% if needed. Also in November, Behrouz Kamalvandi, spokesman for the Atomic Energy Organization of Iran, stated that Iran can enrich up to 60% if needed. President Hassan Rouhani declared that Iran's nuclear program would be "limitless" while the country launches the third phase of quitting from the 2015 nuclear deal.

On January 5, 2020, and Iran responded with missile strikes on US. bases. Two days after the US assassinated Iranian Quds Force commander Qasem Soleimani, Iran's government declared it would no longer observe any JCPOA limits on uranium enrichment capacity, levels, or stockpile size. In March 2020, the IAEA said that Iran had nearly tripled its stockpile of enriched uranium since early November 2019. In September 2020, the IAEA reported that Iran had accumulated ten times as much enriched uranium as permitted by the JCPOA.

Throughout 2021 and 2022, Iran installed cascades of advanced centrifuges (IR-2m, IR-4, IR-6) at Natanz and Fordow, significantly increasing its enrichment output. In February 2021, the IAEA reported that Iran stopped allowing access to data from nuclear sites, as well as plans for future sites. In April 2021, a sabotage attack struck the Natanz enrichment plant, causing an electrical blackout and damaging centrifuges. Iran responded by further increasing enrichment: days later, it began producing 60% enriched uranium, an unprecedented level for Iran, just short of weapons-grade (90% and above). This 60% enrichment took place at Natanz, and later at Fordow as well, yielding a stockpile that as of early 2023 exceeded ~70 kg of 60% uranium. If Iran chose to enrich this material to 90%, it would be sufficient for several nuclear warheads. The UK, France, and Germany said that Iran has "no credible civilian use for uranium metal" and called the news "deeply concerning" because of its "potentially grave military implications". On 25 June 2022, in a meeting with the senior diplomat of the EU, Ali Shamkhani, Iran's top security officer, declared that Iran would continue to advance its nuclear program until the West modifies its "illegal behavior".

In July 2022, according to an IAEA report referred to by Reuters, Iran had increased its uranium enrichment through the use of sophisticated equipment at its underground Fordow plant in a configuration that can more quickly vary between enrichment levels. In September 2022, Germany, United Kingdom and France expressed doubts over Iran's sincerity in returning to the JCPOA after Tehran insisted that the IAEA close its probes into uranium traces at three undeclared Iranian sites. The IAEA said it could not guarantee the peaceful nature of Iran's nuclear program, stating there had been "no progress in resolving questions about the past presence of nuclear material at undeclared sites". United Nations Secretary-General António Guterres urged Iran to hold "serious dialogue" about nuclear inspections and said IAEA's independence is "essential" in response to Iranian demands to end probes. In February 2023, the IAEA reported having found uranium in Iran enriched to 84%. The Iranian government has claimed that this is an "unintended fluctuation" in the enrichment levels, though the Iranians have been openly enriching uranium to 60% purity, a breach of the 2015 nuclear deal. In 2024, Iranian President Masoud Pezeshkian expressed interest in reopening discussions with the United States on the nuclear deal.

In November 2024, Iran announced that it would make new advanced centrifuges after IAEA condemned Iranians' non-compliance and secrecy.

In January 2025, it was reported that Iran was developing long-range missile technology under the Islamic Revolutionary Guard Corps (IRGC), with some designs based on North Korean models. According to the National Council of Resistance of Iran (NCRI), these missiles, such as the Ghaem-100 and Simorgh, could carry nuclear warheads and reach targets as far as 3,000 kilometres (1,900 mi) away, including parts of Europe.

In March 2025, US President Donald Trump sent a letter to Ali Khamenei seeking to reopen negotiations. Ayatollah Ali Khamenei later said, "Some bullying governments insist on negotiations not to resolve issues but to impose their own expectations," which was seen as in response to the letter.

In late March 2025, Khamenei's top advisor Ali Larijani said Iran would have no choice but to develop nuclear weapons if attacked by the United States, Israel or its allies.

In April 2025, Trump revealed that Iran had decided to undertake talks with the United States for an agreement over its nuclear program. On 12 April, both countries held their first high-level meeting in Oman, followed by a second meeting on 19 April in Italy. On May 16, Trump sent Iran an offer and said they have to move quickly or else bad things would happen. On May 17, Khamenei condemned Trump, saying that he lied about wanting peace and that he was not worth responding to, calling the US demands "outrageous nonsense". Khamenei also reiterated that Israel is a "cancerous tumour" that must be uprooted.

On 31 May 2025, IAEA reported that Iran had sharply increased its stockpile of uranium enriched to 60% purity, just below weapons-grade, reaching over 408 kilograms, a nearly 50% rise since February. The agency warned that this amount is enough for multiple nuclear weapons if further enriched. It also noted that Iran remains the only non-nuclear-weapon state to produce such material, calling the situation a "serious concern". In June 2025, the NCRI said Iran is pursuing nuclear weapons through a new program called the "Kavir Plan". According to the NCRI, the new project involves six sites in Semnan province working on warheads and related technology, succeeding the previous AMAD Project.

On June 10, Trump stated that Iran was becoming "much more aggressive" in the negotiations. On 11 June, the Iranian regime threatened US bases in the Middle East, with Defense Minister Aziz Nasirzadeh stating, "If a conflict is imposed on us... all US bases are within our reach, and we will boldly target them in host countries." The US embassy in Iraq evacuated all personnel. The Iran-backed Yemen-based Houthi movement threatened to attack the United States if a strike on Iran were to occur. CENTCOM presented a wide range of military options for an attack on Iran. UK issued threat advisory for ships in the Persian Gulf. US Secretary of Defense Pete Hegseth told Congress that Iran was attempting a nuclear breakout.

On 12 June 2025, IAEA found Iran non-compliant with its nuclear obligations for the first time in 20 years. Iran retaliated by announcing it would launch a new enrichment site and install advanced centrifuges. On the night of June 13, Israel has initiated Operation Rising Lion, a large‑scale aerial assault targeting Iranian nuclear facilities, missile factories, military sites, and commanders across cities including Tehran and Natanz.

On 13 June 2025, Israel attacked the plant as part of the June 2025 Israeli strikes on Iran. Iranian forces said they had shot down an Israeli drone. On 21 June, the US bombed the Fordow Fuel Enrichment Plant, the Natanz Nuclear Facility, and the Isfahan nuclear technology center. In an address from the White House, Trump claimed "Iran's key nuclear enrichment facilities have been completely and totally obliterated,", though later reporting indicated that only Fordow (but not the other two enrichment facilities) was "mostly destroyed."

In early July 2025, Iran suspended co-operation with the United Nations' International Atomic Energy Agency (IAEA). and all IAEA inspectors left Iran by July 4.

=== 2025 Snapback negotiations ===
In July 2025, E3 members, Britain, France and Germany, warned that the snapback mechanism would be triggered if no progress was made in the nuclear talks by the end of August 2025. As a result, Iran turned to Russia and China in order to discuss the threat of sanctions and to strengthen the military ties between them.

On 14 July 2025, amid possible snapback activation by E3, Foreign Ministry spokesman Esmaeil Baqaei warned of consequences and threatened that should it be triggered it would "be met with a proportionate and appropriate response".

On 25 July 2025, after Iranian foreign minister declared that Iran would not abandon its nuclear program nor would it ever halt its enrichment of uranium, negotiations between E3 and Iran were held in Istanbul. Iran's Deputy Foreign Minister Kazem Gharibabadi warned that triggering sanctions "is completely illegal", and Iranian diplomats threatened that Iran would leave the global nuclear non-proliferation treaty if U.N. sanctions were to be reinstated.

On August 26, Iran and the E3 held nuclear talks in Geneva. The discussions were aimed at preventing the European countries from triggering the "snapback" mechanism, which would restore United Nations sanctions on Iran. The negotiations ended without a breakthrough.

=== Snapback activation ===
On August 28, 2025, E3 members, France, Germany, and the United Kingdom, initiated the process of the snapback mechanism, with the prospect of freezing Iranian overseas assets, blocking arms deals with Iran, imposing penal action against development of Iran's ballistic missile program and further restricting Iran's military and nuclear activities. In a letter addressed to the president of the UN Security Council, the foreign ministers of the E3 stated that since 2019, Iran had "increasingly and deliberately ceased performing its JCPOA commitments", including "the accumulation of a highly enriched uranium stockpile which lacks any credible civiliian justification and is unprecedented for a state without a nuclear weapons program". The letter detailed additional Iranian violations of the agreement despite the fact that the E3 "have consistently upheld their agreements under the terms of the JCPOA". The activation opened a 30-day window, intended to reengage Iran, "whose refusal to cooperate with the International Atomic Energy Agency's (IAEA) inspectors started the crisis", in diplomatic negotiations before full restoration of sanctions. According to Euronews, Iran's Foreign Minister Abbas Araghchi declared that it was "unjustified, illegal, and lacking any legal basis" and promised that "The Islamic Republic of Iran will respond appropriately".

== Mechanism under UNSCR 2231 (2015) ==
Under Resolution 2231, the snapback mechanism allows any JCPOA “participant State” to unilaterally reimpose prior U.N. sanctions on Iran in the event of a significant breach of the deal. The process is initiated by a notification to the Security Council of an issue that the State believes constitutes significant non-performance by Iran. Upon such notification, a 30-day clock starts. Within 10 days of the complaint, the Council President is required to table a draft resolution to continue the lifting of sanctions. If the Council does not adopt a resolution to continue sanctions relief within 30 days (for instance, due to a veto by any permanent member), all prior U.N. sanctions automatically “snap back” into force at the end of that period. Crucially, this procedure is veto-proof: because the continuation of sanctions relief requires a positive Council vote, any permanent member can block that resolution - effectively ensuring that the old sanctions are reimposed. In other words, a single veto can reinstate the pre-2015 sanctions, making snapback an “automatic” return of all U.N. measures from resolutions 1696, 1737, 1747, 1803, 1835, 1929, and 2224. The reimposed sanctions would encompass the full range of previous restrictions: an embargo on arms transfers, bans on sensitive nuclear and missile activity, asset freezes and travel bans on designated persons, and calls for states to inspect and seize illicit shipments. Notably, Resolution 2231 also specified that the snapback mechanism itself (along with all JCPOA-related U.N. measures) would expire 10 years after Adoption Day, i.e., on October 18, 2025 - if not invoked before then.

=== Role in the JCPOA negotiations ===
The snapback provision played a pivotal role in the JCPOA negotiations. It provided a compromise between the parties’ interests: Western powers insisted on a reliable way to quickly punish any cheating by Iran, while Iran sought assurance that compliant behavior would not be perpetually subject to great-power veto politics. The innovative solution, attributed in part to a proposal by Russian Foreign Minister Sergey Lavrov, allowed any JCPOA signatory to trigger a return of U.N. sanctions without needing a new Council vote that could be vetoed by others. In practice, this reversed the usual U.N. decision-making: instead of needing agreement to reimpose sanctions, one needed consensus to prevent their reimposition. The mechanism thus neutralized the potential veto power of Russia or China (or, conversely, the U.S., UK or France) if Iran were in material breach. Its inclusion gave the U.S. and European states confidence that the international sanctions regime could be restored swiftly, which was crucial to winning domestic political support for the deal. At the same time, the JCPOA's text underscored that if U.N. or unilateral sanctions were reintroduced, Iran would see that as grounds to cease its own compliance.

== U.S. interpretation and snapback policy ==
The United States was originally a principal architect and supporter of the snapback concept in 2015. U.S. officials emphasized that snapback gave Washington and its allies a unilateral remedy if Iran violated the accord, often explaining that sanctions could be restored “in a snap” if required. In U.S. domestic implementation of the JCPOA, this translated to executive authority to quickly reapply lifted U.S. sanctions. Indeed, after President Donald Trump took office, he repeatedly cited the snapback provision as an option to address concerns about Iran's regional behavior and the deal's sunset clauses. However, in May 2018 due to the Iranian nuclear program, development and testing of ballistic missiles, support of proxy militias and violations of human rights, the Trump administration chose to unilaterally withdraw from the JCPOA entirely, reimposing all U.S. national sanctions that had been lifted, in order to "cut off revenues the regime uses to bankroll terrorist groups, foment global instability, fund nuclear and ballistic missile programs, and enrich its leaders".

In 2020, as a U.N. arms embargo on Iran neared its expiration (scheduled for October 18, 2020 under Resolution 2231), the U.S. moved to invoke the U.N. snapback mechanism, despite having exited the JCPOA. Washington's legal position was that although it was no longer participating in the JCPOA, it remained a “JCPOA participant State” for purposes of Resolution 2231's text (which in 2015 had listed the original P5+1, including the U.S.). Trump administration officials argued that the U.N. resolution's language did not automatically strip the U.S. of its snapback rights upon withdrawal from the political agreement. They further contended that since the JCPOA was never a legally binding treaty, the U.S. could not be in “material breach” of it, and thus its departure did not nullify its authority under the U.N. resolution. On this basis, Secretary of State Mike Pompeo and U.S. diplomats maintained that the U.S. could “trigger” the snapback unilaterally in order to restore all U.N. sanctions - an interpretation sharply contested by the rest of the council and the other JCPOA signatories.

Meanwhile, the U.S. also prepared to enforce sanctions in line with its snapback claim. Following its snapback attempt, the U.S. announced new executive orders and designations to punish any arms transfers to Iran and to blacklist Iranian entities involved in nuclear or missile activities.

== Ramifications and implications ==
=== Impact on Iranian foreign policy ===
The snapback mechanism, and particularly the contested 2020 episode, has significantly influenced Iran's diplomatic posture. Virtually the entire Security Council stood with Iran's position against the U.S. Iranian leaders publicly thanked Russia, China, and European states for defending the JCPOA framework. The episode reinforced Tehran's strategy of driving wedges between the U.S. and its allies, and cemented Iran's reliance on powers like China and Russia to counter U.S. pressure. Facing a U.S. that was willing to violate a U.N.-backed deal, Iran deepened its outreach to non-Western partners; for example, it pursued a 25-year strategic agreement with China and enhanced military cooperation with Russia once the U.N. arms embargo lapsed. At the same time, Iranian officials grew more mistrustful of Western promises. The threat of snapback (and the ease with which a future U.S. administration could unravel sanctions relief) has made Tehran demand stronger guarantees in any renewed negotiations. Iranian diplomats frequently cite the 2020 snapback attempt as evidence that the U.S. could again ignore international agreements - hence Iran has insisted on U.S. assurances and even floated ideas like U.N. resolutions to shield any future deal from unilateral reversal. Regionally, Iran's foreign policy hardened in some areas; for instance, Tehran continued incremental breaches of the nuclear deal while also showcasing that U.S. isolation at the U.N. gave it political cover to resist Washington's demands.

=== Impact on the domestic economy ===
The anticipation or activation of snapback sanctions carries serious ramifications for Iran's economy. The mere existence of the mechanism injects uncertainty for businesses and investors: Iran's economy did receive a boost from JCPOA sanctions relief in 2016, but many Western companies remained skittish, knowing that sanctions could return abruptly if any party invoked snapback. This uncertainty was validated when the U.S. reimposed its sanctions in 2018, devastating Iran's oil exports and currency - a unilateral “snapback” from Iran's perspective. While U.N. snapback in 2020 was not globally recognized, the U.S. threat effectively deterred many international firms from engaging with Iran anyway. Iranian analysts note that the benefits Iran expected from the JCPOA never fully materialized, in part because banks and companies feared a snapback or U.S. policy reversal. Should a legitimate snapback occur (for example, triggered by the E3 in the future), it would re-impose universal constraints on Iran's economy: countries would again be bound (by international law) to restrict trade, oil purchases, and investment in Iran, compounding the effect of U.S. sanctions. Iranian officials warn that such a move would be seen as economic warfare. They have sought to fortify the economy against this threat by increasing trade with neighbours and non-Western markets and by advancing a “resistance economy” that is less vulnerable to foreign sanctions. Nonetheless, a restored U.N. sanctions regime would further shrink Iran's access to the global financial system. An example of the stakes is Iran's oil trade with China - a key lifeline. Analysts observe that if even China were to honor a U.N. snapback and halt Iranian oil imports, Iran's economy would face a major blow, though Beijing would likely resist U.S.-led sanction architecture and continue buying Iranian oil at a discount. In essence, the snapback mechanism hovers as a threat that could trigger an economic shock to Iran comparable to - or even exceeding - the pre-JCPOA period of multilateral sanctions, with direct impacts on Iran's revenue, inflation, and living standards.

=== Impact on Iran’s nuclear program ===
The snapback clause was intended as a check on Iran's nuclear ambitions, but its invocation (or the attempt thereof) has had complex effects on Iran's nuclear decisions. When the U.S. exited the JCPOA and attempted snapback, Iran initially exercised strategic patience - remaining in the deal and complying for a year after U.S. withdrawal. However, as sanctions relief evaporated, Tehran adopted a policy of incremental non-compliance. Starting in mid-2019, and accelerating after 2020, Iran began breaching JCPOA limits (enriching uranium beyond the 3.67% purity cap, expanding its stockpile, deploying advanced centrifuges, etc.) to pressure the remaining parties. Iranian officials explicitly tied these steps to the principle of reciprocity: if Iran does not get the deal's economic benefits due to snapback or equivalent measures, it will not unilaterally adhere to nuclear restrictions. By 2021–2022, Iran had enriched uranium to 60% purity - a level far above civilian needs and near weapons-grade. Although Iran insists its program is peaceful, this escalation is widely seen as leverage and a hedge in case diplomacy fails. The threat of a formal U.N. snapback has elicited dire warnings from Tehran. Iranian leaders have said that if international sanctions are reimposed via snapback, Iran could take the drastic step of leaving the Nuclear Non-Proliferation Treaty (NPT). Throughout 2020, officials like Zarif hinted that snapback would force Iran to curtail cooperation with the IAEA. An adviser to Iran's negotiating team, for instance, cautioned that Iran might expel IAEA inspectors and shut off monitoring cameras if U.N. sanctions returned. Such actions would sharply reduce transparency and could shorten the “breakout” time for Iran to potentially develop a weapon. Western analysts note this scenario would be extremely dangerous: it could trigger military strikes by the U.S. or Israel, who have vowed not to let Iran acquire a bomb.

=== Impact on international diplomacy ===
The snapback dispute significantly affected international diplomacy and the credibility of multilateral institutions. The 2020 U.S. attempt - effectively the U.S. against the world - was a rare instance of almost complete unity among Security Council members against a permanent member's position. Allies like France, the UK, and Germany not only opposed the U.S. legally, but also diplomatically signalled their continued commitment to the JCPOA in defiance of Washington. This rift strained transatlantic relations: European officials lamented the U.S. approach as undermining the Security Council and the authority of its resolutions. Analysts noted that the episode “deepen[ed] the rift between the United States and Europe” and “undermine[d] the credibility of both the U.S. and the Security Council”. The U.N. was put in an awkward position - its most powerful member was claiming to enforce a resolution that the Council majority believed had not been activated. The U.N. Secretary-General's refusal to implement the purported snapback (for example, by not re-listing sanctioned Iranian entities) preserved the council's institutional integrity, but it also revealed the limits of U.N. enforcement power when great powers disagree. The net effect was a diplomatic loss for the U.S. (isolation and reputational damage for flouting a deal and Council consensus) and a test of the Security Council's cohesion. Some feared this conflict weakened the council's future ability to address Iran: if one side doesn't respect the process, others might not either. On the other hand, many countries viewed the episode as a victory for multilateralism and the rule of law, since the council's majority will prevailed over unilateralism.

The snapback mechanism remains a factor in ongoing diplomacy. After the change of U.S. administration in 2021, President Joe Biden's team rescinded the Trump-era claim that U.N. sanctions were active and sought a return to mutual compliance with Iran. Indirect talks to revive the JCPOA have so far stalled, and Iran's nuclear advances continue. In this context, the European trio (E3) have quietly signalled that they may invoke snapback themselves if Iran's breaches become too severe or if the JCPOA is beyond saving as the 2025 expiry of Resolution 2231 nears. Throughout 2023, reports emerged that the E3 were considering a snapback to reimpose U.N. sanctions, especially after Iran's production of near-weapons-grade uranium and reduced cooperation with inspectors. Such a move would aim to pressure Iran back into negotiations, but the E3 have thus far held off, wary of collapsing the deal entirely. For Iran, the prospect of a unified international snapback - now that the U.S. and Europe are broadly aligned again under Biden - is a serious diplomatic concern, as it would rob Tehran of the current wedge between Washington and other powers. Iranian diplomats have tried to dissuade the E3 by warning that an EU/U.N. snapback would be met with the harsh responses described above, and by leveraging support from Russia and China to argue against it.

== See also ==
- International sanctions against Iran
- United States withdrawal from the Joint Comprehensive Plan of Action
- Nuclear program of Iran
- Iran–United States relations
- Iran nuclear deal framework
