= 2023 Iran drone attacks =

2023 attack on Iranian targets

2023 drone attacks on Iran
- Part of Iran–Israel proxy conflict
- Location: Isfahan, Iran
- Target: Iran
- Date: January 28, 2023
- Executed by: Israel

On the night of January 28-29, 2023, several unidentified drones attacked an ammunition factory in Isfahan, with other unexplained explosions across Iran, including a fire in an oil refinery in Tabriz and reports of explosions and fire in Karaj.

Israel gave no comment, but the Mossad was implicated by most Western intelligence and Iranian sources in similar successful attacks against Iranian nuclear facilities and defense industry, especially in 2020. Iran intensified its threats to destroy Israel, despite downplaying the attacks.

The governments of Russia and Ukraine publicly reacted to the events. Russia condemned the attack, while Ukraine said that Iran had been warned about supplying Russia with drones.

== Background ==
There were a number of explosions and fires around Iranian military, nuclear and industrial facilities in 2020. In 2021, Iran accused Israel of sabotaging its key Natanz nuclear site and vowed revenge. In July 2022, Iran said that it had arrested a sabotage team made up of Kurdish militants working for Israel who planned to blow up a sensitive defence industry centre in Isfahan.

== Explosions ==
On the night of January 28–29, 2023, three unidentified drones attacked an ammunition factory in Isfahan, amidst other unexplained explosions across Iran.

The New York Times stated that it was likely that the drones used near Isfahan were quadcopters with a short flight range, and also that since Isfahan is distant from Iran's borders, it was likely that the drones were launched from inside Iran.

=== Isfahan ===
On January 28, 2023 at 23:30 local time an ammunition factory of the Iranian Defence Ministry in Isfahan was attacked by three drones, causing a large explosion. The ministry said that the attack occurred in Imam Khomeini Street of Isfahan, and that the damage to the buildings was minor. According to the ministry, three drones were shot down and the attack was unsuccessful. Some citizens said they heard three or four explosions.

=== Other explosions or fires ===
There was a fire in an oil refinery in Tabriz during the same night. The Wall Street Journal described the relation between the Tabriz fire and the Isfahan attack as unclear. According to Iran International, there were reports of explosions and fire in Karaj on the same night. Another explosion was reported at an oil facility in Azarshahr.

== Reactions ==
According to anonymous United States officials and people familiar with the operation, the attacks were conducted by Israeli forces, on which Israel had no comment.

The Jerusalem Post called the attack "a tremendous success", paraphrasing various anonymous sources, and said Iran is downplaying it.

The Russian Foreign Ministry condemned the attack.
