= Iran explosions (January – February 2026) =

- Date: 31 January – 26 February 2026
- Time: (IRST)
- Location: Iran
- Cause: Suspected gas leak (Iranian authorities); unknown causes (February 6th)
- Deaths: 4
- Injuries: 14

From 31 January to 26 February 2026, several explosions took place across Iran.

== Background ==
The explosions took place a few weeks after the 2025–2026 Iranian protests, which started on 28 December 2025 and ended after Iranian authorities shot dead tens of thousands of protesters.

== Timeline ==
=== 31 January ===
==== Bandar Abbas ====
An explosion took place in Bandar Abbas in an eight-floor building, killing a four-year-old girl and injuring 14. The first to third floors were seriously damaged, as were some cars and a shop, and the building's windows were shattered. A video by an online newspaper showed a man in a green security force uniform and wearing a neck brace being carried out from the damaged building on a stretcher. According to Iran International, the video that showed the security force member being carried out from the building was taken offline by Sobh-e Sahel and its network partners.

Unofficial sources stated that Alireza Tangsiri, an Islamic Revolutionary Guard Corps (IRGC) naval commander, was the target of the explosion. The IRGC-associated Tasnim News Agency denied the claim. Iranian officials and state media stated the explosion was caused by a gas leak. In a video shared after the blast, a local resident pointed out that the building was not connected to a gas network.

==== Other cities ====
An explosion took place in Ahvaz, killing four people, according to local officials. Tehran Times described the event as a gas explosion.

Explosions also occurred in Karaj and in Parand on 31 January 2026.

=== 2 February ===
On 2 February, a large fire broke out in a marketplace in Jannat Abad in northwest Tehran. Thick smoke was visible across much of Tehran. Teams from five fire stations were needed to respond to the fire, which took several hours to contain. No injuries were caused according to local media.

=== 6 February ===
Large fires engulfed a cold storage facility on the Ardabil-Moghan road in northwestern Iran, near the Azerbaijan border. Unconfirmed reports of Explosions were reported on social media. Army reported a fire in Tehran HQ.

=== 10 February ===
Large fire in the Tehran power plant.

=== 11 February ===
A large explosion on the anniversary of the 1979 Islamic revolution took out two armored vehicles in Sistan, Mohamed Abad, Iranshahr city.

=== 16 February ===
Major explosion in the Tabriz Petrochemical Refinery Nik Gas.

=== 18 February ===
A large explosion occurred in Tehran.

=== 22 February ===
A large explosion occurred in Parand, Hamedan.

=== 25 February ===
Shots fired and explosion in Pasteur, Tehran neighborhood near Office of the Supreme Leader of Iran and Majlis.

=== 26 February ===
Large fire broke out at an industrial center in Abadan.

== Reactions ==
Israeli officials denied responsibility for the explosions in Bandar Abbas and Ahvaz.

United States officials also denied involvement.

== See also ==
- 2020 Iran explosions
