= Natanz Nuclear Facility =

Nuclear facility in Iran

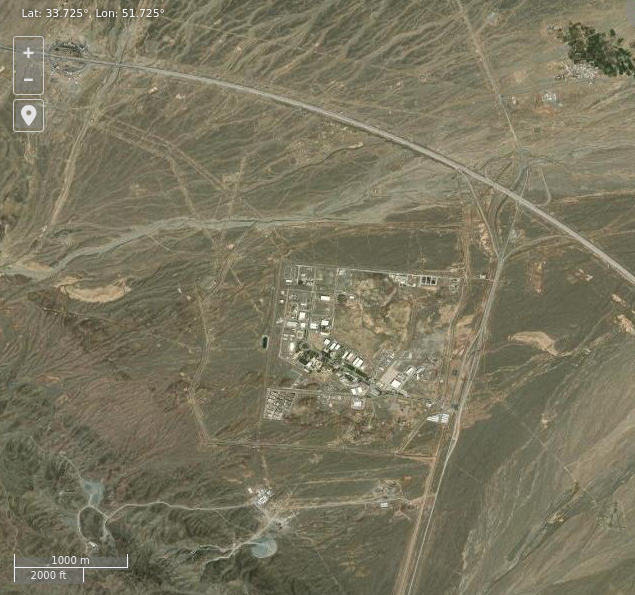
- Satellite imagery of the Natanz Nuclear Facility
- Official name: Shahid Ahmadi Roshan Nuclear Facility
- Country: Iran
- Location: Natanz County, Isfahan province
- Coordinates: 33°43′30″N 51°43′30″E
- Owner: Government of Iran
- Operator: Atomic Energy Organization of Iran

External links
- Commons: Related media on Commons

The Natanz Nuclear Facility (Persian: تأسیسات هسته‌ای نطنز), officially the Shahid Ahmadi Roshan Nuclear Facilities (Persian: تأسیسات هسته‌ای شهید احمدی روشن), is one of the nuclear facilities in Iran, which was built near Natanz for uranium enrichment. This center is part of Iran's nuclear program. The underground enrichment facility of this center is protected by a concrete shield with a thickness of approximately 7.6 m (25 ft).

According to the Iranian authorities, the gas centrifuges in this center were built 40–50 metres (130–160 ft) underground, for safety reasons. and also for being safe from "possible air attack".

The existence of this nuclear center was first exposed in 2002 by the People's Mojahedin Organization of Iran. Under the 2015 Joint Comprehensive Plan of Action, Natanz was to be the only uranium enrichment site in Iran for 15 years, where it would enrich uranium up to 3.67%, under International Atomic Energy Agency (IAEA) safeguards including 24-hour monitoring.

In June 2025, during the Twelve-Day War between Israel and Iran, the facility was bombed extensively by the Israeli Air Force. The above ground facility was said to have been partially destroyed during the strikes, according to IAEA chief Rafael Grossi. On 22 June 2025, the facility was bombed by the United States, using two heavy bunker busters dropped from a B-2 Spirit. On 2 March 2026, satellite images were made public which confirmed that the Natanz facility had sustained fresh damage in the 2026 Iran war. As of 3 March 2026, it is confirmed that while the core underground enrichment facility has not been destroyed, the significant damage to the entrance buildings at Natanz had made the facility inaccessible. On 21 March 2026, the U.S. conducted further strikes on the facility.

== Naming ==
In February 2012, with the presence of Mahmoud Ahmadinejad, the then-president of Iran, the names of 5 nuclear centers and departments of Iran were changed to the names of five assassinated people. Natanz Nuclear Facility name was changed to "Shahid Ahmadi Roshan Nuclear Facility" in memory of Mostafa Ahmadi Roshan, who was assassinated on 11 January 2012.

Before that, the name of this nuclear facility was the same as the nearby city, Natanz. It is still known internationally with the name "Natanz Nuclear Facility".

== Facilities ==
The Fuel Enrichment Plant (FEP) covers 100,000 square meters that is built 8 meters underground and protected by a concrete wall 2.5 meters thick, itself protected by another concrete wall. In 2004, the roof was hardened with reinforced concrete and covered with 22 meters of earth. The complex has been described as being about three floors below ground, and consists of three underground buildings, two of which were built to house 50,000 centrifuges, about 14,000 of which are installed and about 11,000 are in operation, and six buildings above-ground, including two 25,000 square meter halls used for the assembly of gas centrifuges, as well as a number of administrative buildings.

The Pilot Fuel Enrichment Plant (PFEP) is located within the complex which houses the FEP in a number of buildings above ground, and serves as a facility for research, development, testing and pilot enrichment. The facility began operation in 2003. It consists of one hall which is divided into a section for research and development and another for production, and can house 6 cascades of 164 centrifuges each. The PFEP is used by Iran to test new centrifuge designs. International Atomic Energy Agency (IAEA) reports have documented the presence of IR-1, IR-2m, IR-3, IR-4, IR-5, IR-6, and IR6s centrifuges in the facility, and as of November 2022 Iran was involved in testing IR-8, IR-8b and IR-9 centrifuges at the site. On March 3, 2026, the IAEA confirmed that the facility suffered significant damage in recent bombings, with areas such the facility's entrances suffering the most significant damage.

== History ==
=== Acknowledgement, operations and expansion ===
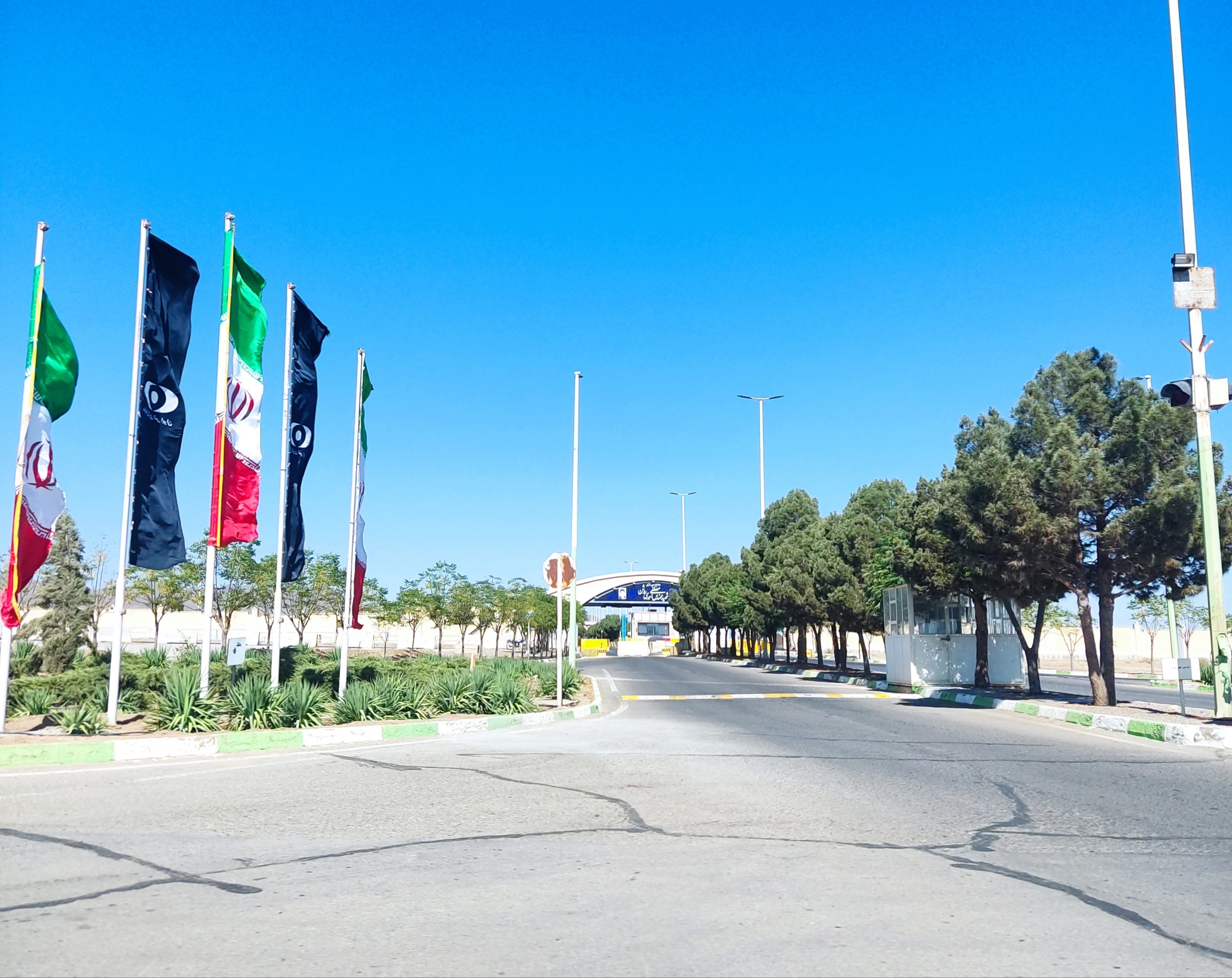
The entrance to the Natanz nuclear facility on the old Kashan-Natanz road

In the early 2000s, North Korea received approximately $25 million for giving Iran tunneling technology, which was widely employed at the underground nuclear site. In 2002, the NCRI exposed the existence of an undisclosed uranium enrichment facility in Natanz, leading to concerns about Iran's nuclear program. This once-secret site was one of the two exposed by Alireza Jafarzadeh in August 2002.

In 2003, after the Iranian government formally acknowledged the facilities, the Atomic Energy Agency inspected them, finding that they had a more advanced nuclear program than had previously been anticipated by U.S. intelligence. The initial discovery of the enrichment facility in Natanz, as well as Iran's refusal to fully cooperate with the IAEA, heightened tensions between Iran and Western powers.

In February 2003, IAEA Director General Mohamed ElBaradei visited the site and reported that 160 centrifuges were complete and ready for operation, with 1,000 more under construction at the site. During 2003, IAEA inspectors found particles of highly enriched uranium (HEU) at the Natanz facility. Iran claimed the material was contaminated by the supplier country, though Iran did not name it. In accordance with Code 3.1 of the Subsidiary Arrangements to Iran's safeguards agreement that were in force up to that time, Iran was not obligated to declare the Natanz enrichment facility until six months before nuclear material was introduced into the facility.

Enrichment of uranium at the plant was halted in July 2004 during negotiations with European countries. In 2006, Iran announced that it would resume uranium enrichment. In September 2007, the Iranian government announced it had installed three centrifuges at Natanz. In 2010, the IAEA was told by the Iranian government that future enrichment programmes would take place at Natanz, beginning in March 2011.

After the election of Mahmoud Ahmadinejad as president of Iran in August 2005, the regime reversed its cooperative stance with the IAEA. On 10 January 2006, Iran removed the IAEA's safeguarding seals from the facility and resumed uranium enrichment, introducing uranium hexafluoride gas (UF_{6}) into centrifuges both in the FEP and PFEP. According to the IAEA, in 2009 there were approximately 7,000 centrifuges installed at Natanz, of which 5,000 were producing low enriched uranium. In August 2010, the IAEA said Iran had started using a second set of 164 centrifuges linked in a cascade to enrich uranium to up to 20% at its Natanz Pilot Fuel Enrichment Plant.

In 2010, an Iranian announcement confirmed by the IAEA stated that the PFEP had begun to enrich uranium hexafluoride (UF_{6}) to 20%. Starting in July of that year, Iran has been feeding UF_{6} into two interconnected IR-1 cascades of 164 centrifuges each, in the production hall. As of May 2013, Iran had produced 177.8 kg of UF_{6} enriched up to 20% in the PFEP. This development heightened concerns over a potential nuclear breakout, as a large stockpile of uranium enriched to 20% would cut the time needed to produce weapons-grade uranium by more than half. In April 2021 Iran began enriching UF_{6} to 60% at the PFEP, using IR-4 and IR-6 centrifuges.

In January 2013, Fereydoun Abbasi from the Atomic Energy Organization of Iran said: "five percent uranium enrichment is continuing at Natanz, and we will continue 20 percent enrichment at Fordow and Natanz to meet our needs".

Daily inspection by the IAEA of the Natanz site was agreed as part of the nuclear enrichment reduction agreement made with the P5+1 countries in November 2013.

In July 2020, the Atomic Energy Organization of Iran released photos of a building, presumed to be a centrifuge assembly facility, after a recent explosion. An unnamed Middle Eastern intelligence official later claimed that damage to the facility was caused by an explosive device.

In October 2020, the Center for Nonproliferation Studies released satellite images acknowledging that Iran had begun the construction of an underground plant near its nuclear facility at Natanz. The International Atomic Energy Agency described this as the first steps toward building an advanced centrifuge assembly plant.

In November 2020, the IAEA reported that Iran had started feeding UF_{6} into a newly installed underground cascade of 174 advanced IR-2m centrifuges at Natanz, which the JCPOA did not permit. In December 2020, the IAEA reported that Tehran "holds more than 12 times the amount of enriched uranium" permitted under the JCPOA, and that "work has also begun on the construction of new underground facilities close to Natanz, its main enrichment facility".

In March 2021, Iran restarted enriching uranium at the Natanz facility with a third set of advanced IR-4 nuclear centrifuges in a series of violations of the 2015 nuclear accord. On 10 April, Iran began injecting UF_{6} gas into advanced IR-5 and IR-6 centrifuges at Natanz, but the next day, a presumed accident occurred in the electricity distribution network. On 11 April, the Islamic Republic News Agency reported that the incident was due to a power failure and that there were no injuries nor any escape of radioactive material. Further details eventually emerged that the incident was possibly an attack orchestrated by Israel.

On 14 April 2022, the IAEA said in a report seen by Reuters that Iran was starting to operate a new workshop at Natanz that would build parts for uranium-enriching centrifuges using machinery relocated from its now-closed Karaj plant.

On 29 April 2022, according to IAEA Director General Rafael Grossi, Iran's new workshop at Natanz for fabricating centrifuge parts was set up underground, presumably to protect it from possible attacks.

According to Iran Watch, as of October 2024, the Natanz Fuel Enrichment Plant (FEP) was operating 36 cascades (clusters) of IR-1 centrifuges and 30 more advanced centrifuges of the IR-2m, IR-4 and IR-6 models, while the Pilot Fuel Enrichment Plant (PFEP) at Natanz was operating nearly 1000 advanced centrifuges of the IR-4 and IR-6 models, which are enriching uranium to 60%. There are several thousand IR-1 centrifuges in storage in Natanz, as well as a number of powerful centrifuges under development which contribute to the growth of Iran's stockpile of enriched uranium. The accumulation and eventual deployment of large numbers of centrifuges would allow Iran to accelerate the production of nuclear fuel, and potentially allow further enrichment of weapons-grade uranium.

In November 2024, according to The Washington Post, satellite images showed that construction was underway at the Natanz Nuclear Facility.

=== Sabotages and cyber attacks ===
Natanz was hit by a sophisticated cyber attack, Operation Olympic Games, reportedly conducted by a coalition of German, French, British, American, Dutch and Israeli intelligence organizations. The attack used a Stuxnet worm which hampered the operation of plant's centrifuges and damaged them over time. The alleged goal was not to destroy Iran's nuclear program completely but to stall it enough for sanctions and diplomacy to take effect. This alleged goal was achieved, as the Joint Comprehensive Plan of Action (JCPOA) nuclear treaty with Iran was reached in July 2015.

Around 2 a.m. local time on 2 July 2020, a fire and explosion damaged a centrifuge production plant at a nuclear enrichment facility in Natanz. A group known as the "Cheetahs of the Homeland" claimed responsibility for the attack. Some Iranian officials suggested that the incident may have been caused by cyber sabotage.

On 10 April 2021, Iran began injecting uranium hexafluoride gas into advanced IR-5 and IR-6 centrifuges at Natanz, but on the next day, an explosion occurred, causing extensive damage and fires. On 11 April, IRNA reported that the incident was due to a power failure and that there were no injuries nor any escape of radioactive material. Reports alleged that Mossad had orchestrated the attack. On 17 April, Iranian state television named 43-year-old Reza Karimi from Kashan as the suspect behind the blast, stating that he had fled the country before the sabotage happened. In July 2021, Iran limited inspectors' access to the plant, citing security concerns.

=== 2025 Israeli airstrikes ===
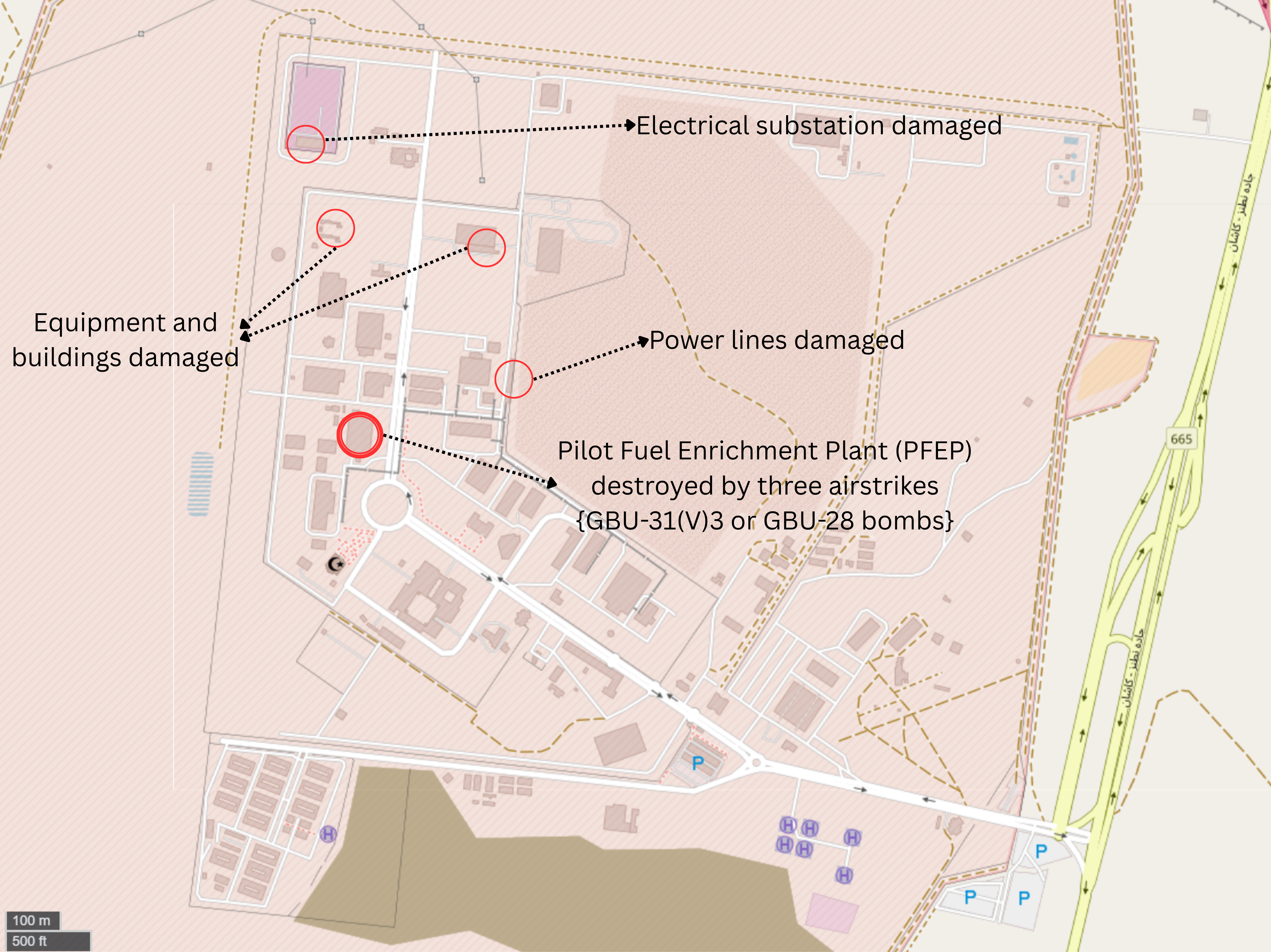
Israeli airstrike locations at the Natanz Nuclear Facility

The Natanz Nuclear Facility was damaged on 13 June, the first day of the Twelve-Day War. The Pilot Fuel Enrichment Plant, a multi-story enrichment hall containing 1,700 advanced gas centrifuges, was destroyed with at least three explosive impacts visible in satellite imagery. 60% enriched uranium was being produced by the Pilot Fuel Enrichment Plant at the time of the strikes. An electrical substation feeding power to the Natanz Nuclear Facility was damaged causing a site-wide power outage. The delicate gas centrifuges in the underground Fuel Enrichment Plant were likely severely damaged or destroyed by this unexpected loss of power. Direct impacts on the earth above the underground enrichment halls were visible in satellite imagery, but their significance remains unknown. Air defenses around the facility were significantly damaged.

=== 2025 American airstrikes ===
On June 22, the United States Air Force and Navy attacked Natanz Nuclear Facility. Two other nuclear sites, at Fordow and Isfahan, were struck.

Seven Northrop B-2 Spirit bombers flew non-stop from Whiteman Air Force Base in Missouri and dropped two GBU-57A/B MOP (Massive Ordnance Penetrator) bombs on Natanz and 12 on the Fordow Fuel Enrichment Plant. Submarines fired 30 BGM-109 Tomahawk cruise missiles at Natanz and Isfahan. This was the first combat use of the "bunker buster" MOP bombs.

=== Kuh-e Kolang Gaz La ("Pickaxe Mountain") ===
After the 2020 explosions near Natanz, Ali Akbar Salehi stated that Iran will be constructing a "more modern, spacious, and comprehensive" site inside a nearby mountain. This matched with satellite imagery of excavations and construction at Kuh-e Kolang Gaz La ("Pickaxe Mountain") in autumn 2020 which intensified in 2021.

The size and the uses of the site are uncertain. Its officially stated purpose is the "production and assembly of advanced centrifuges".

According to an analysis of satellite images by The Washington Post, after the American strike, Iran began accelerating construction on the underground site of Kuh-e Kolang tunneled into the Zagros mountain range approximately one mile to the south of the Natanz nuclear facility. Although work on the site began in 2020, international inspectors were never given access. According to analysts who monitor the site's development, its depth may exceed that of the Natanz site, at 260-330 feet, and is potentially intended for the secure storage of Iran's stockpile of near-weapons-grade uranium or for covert uranium enrichment. The site's footprint aboveground covers an area of approximately one square mile, and features two pairs of entrance tunnels, one to the east and one to the west. Satellite images reveal major changes made to the site between 30 June and 18 September: construction of a 4000 foot security wall which completed the enclosure, reinforcement of one of the tunnel entrances, increased piles of excavated spoil indicating underground expansion, as well as the grading of the road parallel to the perimeter.

Trump has threatened to destroy the site. It is uncertain if such an operation is feasible, although the US can at least disrupt the access to the site.

=== 2026 American-Israeli strikes ===
On 3 March 2026, satellite images provided by Vantor were released which confirmed that the Natanz nuclear facility sustained fresh damage in bombings which took place by March 1 and 2, 2026. On 3 March 2026, the IAEA confirmed that the facility suffered significant damage in these recent bombings, with areas such the facility's entrances suffering the most significant damage. Despite the facility's core underground enrichment facility remaining intact, the damage to the entrance buildings made Natanz inaccessible. On 21 March 2026, the U.S. carried out strikes on the facility using bunker buster bombs.

The New York Times cited experts who said that the underground nuclear facility is "buried so deep that it may lie beyond the reach of America's most powerful bunker-buster bombs". The site's existence may compel a negotiated resolution to the 2026 Iran War including disposal of the facilities and materials there, although entry and demolition by sappers, seizure by special operations forces, and deliberate chemical contamination to prevent its use were still options under consideration as of April 17, according to the Times.

== See also ==
- Bushehr Nuclear Power Plant
- Darkhovin Nuclear Power Plant
- Fordow Fuel Enrichment Plant
- Isfahan Nuclear Technology/Research Center
- IR-40
- List of power stations in Iran
- Nuclear program of Iran
- Supreme Nuclear Committee of Iran
