= Nuclear Technology Day (Iran) =

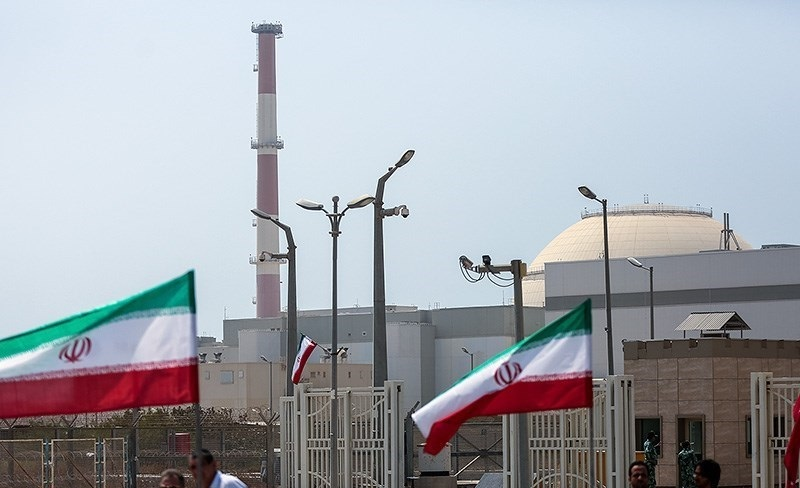
Bushehr Nuclear Power Plant

National Nuclear Energy Day (Persian: روز ملی فناوری هسته‌ای) is observed on 9 April (Farvardin 20th) in Iran. The observation marks the '9 April 2006' when Iran announced it had successfully domesticated the complete cycle of Uranium enrichment despite the sanctions.

== Background ==
In 2003, Iran opposition groups efforts in Western media towards accusing Iran of building a nuclear weapon made Europe and the United States sensitive. These countries tried to halt the Iranian nuclear activities under various pretexts, but on 9 April 2006, Iran was able to complete the full cycle of nuclear fuel production.

== Holiday observation ==
In 2010, as part of a ceremony in honor of the holiday, the first sample of the latest Iranian-made nuclear fuel and a model of a third generation centrifuge for enriching uranium were presented.

== See also ==
- Assassination of Iranian nuclear scientists
