= Behrouz Kamalvandi =

Iranian politician and diplomat

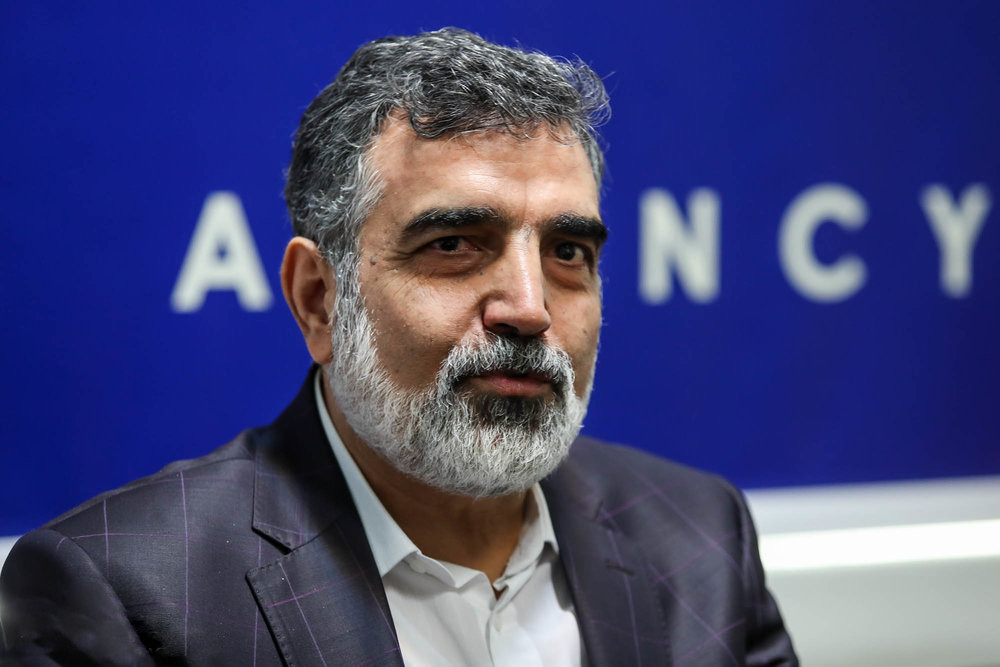
Kamalvandi in 2018

Behrouz Kamalvandi (Persian: بهروز کمالوندی; born c. 1955 in Tehran) is an Iranian diplomat. He is currently the spokesman for the Atomic Energy Organization of Iran (AEOI).

== Injury ==
On April 12, 2021 hours after an incident took place at the electricity distribution network of Shahid Mostafa Ahmadi Roshan nuclear facility in Natanz, Kamalvandi visited the site along with the head of the AEOI Ali Akbar Salehi and sustained an injury while doing an inspection. Kamalvandi was immediately transferred to a hospital in the nearby city of Kashan. The incident happened during inspection after Kamalvandi fell from a height of seven meters. Kamalvandi's overall health is satisfactory, but his ankle and head have sustained fractures.
