= 2020 Iran explosions =

Unexplained explosions in Iranian nuclear facility territory

- Date: 25 June – 19 July 2020
- Location: Iran
- Suspects: Israel

The 2020 Iran explosions were a series of eleven explosions in Iran, including at an advanced centrifuge assembly facility, alleged missile sites, petrochemical centers, power plants, a nuclear enrichment facility and a medical clinic. First reported on 25 June 2020, the Iranian government has denied reports of explosions in its missile sites while acknowledging damage to its largest nuclear enrichment facility in Natanz.

Some Western and Iranian officials stated the cause of explosions to be Israeli cyber attacks and covert US and Israeli strikes, as part of the broader Iran–Israel proxy conflict. The government vowed to retaliate if sabotage was confirmed in its Natanz nuclear facility.

== Timeline ==
=== Parchin explosion and Shiraz blackout ===
At noon on 25 June 2020, an explosion hit in the military complex of Parchin, 30 kilometers southeast of the capital Tehran. Within the same hour a power outage affected half of the southern city of Shiraz; housing major military facilities. Officials declared the explosion a gas storage accident and said that an explosion had hit the power station in Shiraz, causing the blackout. A Western analyst stated that the explosion in Parchin had occurred in a missile storage facility, with hidden nuclear detonation technology work.

A Western analyst claimed the explosion in Parchin was caused by an Israeli cyberattack, while a senior Iranian commander said he could not comment whether the explosion was a cyberattack until there was a conclusion on the issue. Citing an unnamed senior source, the Kuwaiti newspaper Al-Jarida reported that the facility was destroyed in an airstrike by Israeli F-35 stealth fighter jets.

On 30 June 2020, American and Israeli officials speaking to The New York Times said they "had nothing to do with" the explosion in Parchin.

=== Tehran clinic explosion ===
On 30 June 2020, an explosion occurred in the Sina At'har health center in the capital Tehran, killing 19 people including 15 women and 4 men. According to the deputy mayor of Tehran the explosion was caused by a leak from medical gas tanks in the building.

=== Natanz centrifuge assembly facility explosion ===
On 2 July 2020, an explosion hit a centrifuge assembly facility near the city of Natanz. Three quarters of the above-ground parts of the facility where advanced centrifuges were being assembled were damaged. Iran admitted serious damage to its facility while Western analysts said the explosion had set back the Iranian nuclear program one to two years.

The same day, a US-based source reported that a group calling itself the "Homeland Panthers" (Persian: یوزپلنگان وطن yuzpalangan vatan) claimed responsibility for the explosion at the Natanz nuclear enrichment facility. The New York Times claimed that a source which it identified as a "Middle Eastern intelligence official with knowledge of the episode" told the newspaper that Israel was responsible for the attack, and that a powerful bomb had been used. In addition, it cited an Islamic Revolutionary Guard Corps member who was briefed on the topic and had spoken to the newspaper anonymously as claiming that an explosive device was used. The New York Times later reported that officials with knowledge of the incident stated the blast was most likely the result of an Israeli bomb, possibly at a strategic gas line, but a cyberattack was not out of the question. The Kuwaiti newspaper Al-Jarida reported that Israel had caused the explosion with a cyberattack.

=== Khuzestan explosions ===
On 4 July 2020, an explosion hit the Shahid Medhaj Zargan power plant in the city of Ahvaz. Meanwhile 70 people were injured following a chlorine gas leak at Karun petrochemical center in the city of Mahshahr, near Ahvaz.

=== Baqershahr explosion ===
On 7 July 2020, 2 people were killed and 3 others were injured following an explosion inside an oxygen factory in the town of Baqershahr, south of the capital Tehran. IRIB said "human error" was the cause of the blast.

According to Western analysts the factory was near the warehouse where an archive of information on Iran's nuclear program was stolen in a raid by Israeli intelligence agents in 2018. It has been claimed that the factory belongs to an Iranian automotive manufacturer that closely cooperates with the Iranian Ministry of Defense as well as the Islamic Revolutionary Guard Corps.

=== Tehran explosions ===
On 9 July 2020, an explosion was reported in western Tehran. Officials denied that an explosion took place but admitted that power had been cut off in the area.

According to Western analysts the blast hit a missile facility/warehouse belonging to Revolutionary Guards. Analysts speaking to The New York Times said that the blast had hit an area with underground facilities, associated with chemical weapons research and an unidentified military production site. An intelligence official told The New York Times that Israel was possibly behind the explosion.

On 11 July 2020, a gas explosion shook a residential building in Tehran, injuring one person.

=== Mahshahr petrochemical plant explosion ===
On 12 July 2020, a fire followed by an explosion hit the Tondgooyan petrochemical plant in the southwest. A spokesperson for the petrochemical company said the fire and explosion occurred due to "technical problems", and that "hot weather" was also to blame.

=== Mashhad explosion ===
On 13 July 2020, an explosion hit an industrial complex near the northeastern city of Mashhad. Mehr News Agency said the explosion occurred when a gas condensate storage tank exploded, and that the police were investigating the cause.

=== Ahvaz pipeline explosion ===
On 18 July 2020, an explosion was reported in an oil pipeline in the southwestern city of Ahvaz.

=== Isfahan power plant explosion ===
On 19 July 2020, an explosion hit a power plant in Isfahan province. No one was injured.

== Alleged Israeli aims ==
According to one report from Business Insider, citing an unnamed former Israeli official and a European Union intelligence official, Israel is behind some of the explosions, with the European source "fearing" that the goal of the Israeli government to provoke a military confrontation with Iran while U.S. President Donald Trump remains in office. According to the EU official, "There would be a lot less appetite for adventures and secret missions to blow up nuclear facilities under a Biden administration."

== Response ==
In October 2020, Rafael Grossi, Director General of International Atomic Energy Agency (IAEA) confirmed to Associated Press that Iran started building an underground centrifuge assembly plant after the explosions, and added that Iran also continues to stockpile greater amounts of low-enriched uranium, but does not appear to possess enough to produce a weapon.

== See also ==
- Stuxnet
- 2021 Natanz incident
- Assassination of Iranian nuclear scientists
- Iran–Israel proxy conflict
- 2026 Iran explosions
