= European Maritime Awareness in the Strait of Hormuz =

French maritime monitoring mission

The European Maritime Awareness in the Strait of Hormuz (EMASoH) is a French-led maritime monitoring mission with the goal to protect maritime flows through the Strait of Hormuz. It is headquartered at the French naval base in Abu Dhabi and comprises a diplomacy track (EMASoH) and a military track (AGENOR). The mission has 9 participating countries including Belgium, Denmark, France, Greece, Italy, the Netherlands, Norway, and, with political support, Germany and Portugal. These are all European countries, however EMASOH is not initiated by the European Union.

EMASOH was launched on 20 January 2020 and was fully operational by 25 February 2020. The military Operation AGENOR is currently being commanded by French Vice Admiral Slaars. Italian Rear admiral Mauro Panebianco is the force commander. The Senior Civilian Representative is Jakob Brix Tange from Denmark.

Map of Strait of Hormuz

== Economic Context ==
The Strait of Hormuz is one of the most important straits for the global oil and shipping industry. In 2018, an average of 21 million barrels of oil per day flowed through the Strait of Hormuz. This is the equivalent of 21% of global petroleum liquids consumption. In 2018, more than one-quarter of the global liquefied natural gas trade traversed the Strait of Hormuz. The options to ship oil without the use of the Strait of Hormuz are limited. Only Saudi Arabia and the United Arab Emirates have pipelines that can ship oil outside the Persian Gulf.

20.2% of the world's ships are flagged or owned by an EMASOH-participating country, which means that there are around 11,000 ships under the responsibility of EMASOH states. There are around 4 to 5 thousand ships located in the EMASoH area of operations at any given moment. Out of those 4 to 5 thousand are around 10% EMASoH-flagged or operated ships. The EMASoH mission records around 25-30 crossings of the Strait of Hormuz by those ships.

== Historical Context ==
2019 was a year of rising instability in the Persian Gulf and the Strait of Hormuz. Multiple incidents occurred which contributed to a rise in insecurity and tension in the region.

Two Saudi Arabian oil tankers, a Norwegian oil products tanker and a UAE bunker barge were sabotaged in the May 2019 Gulf of Oman incident. This incident occurred near the Fujairah emirate, which contains one of the biggest bunkering hubs in the world, located close to the Strait of Hormuz. In a separate incident in June 2019, two oil tankers were attacked in the Gulf of Oman near the Strait. A U.S. surveillance drone was also shot down in June 2019 by an Iranian surface-to-air missile over the Strait of Hormuz. The incident is contested between the two countries as Iranian officials argued the drone was located in Iranian airspace, while American officials argue it was flying in international airspace. In July 2019, right after the U.S. shot down an Iranian drone in the region and in the same month the British military seized an Iranian tanker near Gibraltar, a British oil tanker was seized by Iran while it was passing through the Strait of Hormuz.

EMASoH has also emphasized the 2021 Suez Canal obstruction as an example of the importance of maritime choke points and the EMASoH mission. The April 2021 EMASoH Information bulletin states that although the Strait of Hormuz cannot be blocked by a ship like in the Suez Canal, the mission is working to ensure a "Suez-effect" does not happen.

== The Mission ==
=== Diplomacy Pillar ===
The creation of EMASoH as a mission came from the rising tensions in the Persian Gulf and the Strait of Hormuz. In a joint statement on 20 January 2020 announcing the creation of EMASoH, the participating EMASoH countries expressed concern regarding the instable situation in the Persian Gulf region and Strait of Hormuz. The statement notes that the incidents in the region "have been affecting the freedom of navigation and the security of European and non-European vessels and crews in the area for months." The countries behind the statement worried for a broader conflict with more devastating global consequences and stressed the importance of the freedom of navigation and lowering the tensions in the region.

==== Goal of EMASoH ====
The goal of the mission is to keep a low-profile and neutral position in the Strait of Hormuz with the intent of de-escalation and reducing tensions in the region. The diplomacy track of EMASoH is fixed in three principles: de-escalation, non-state facing approach, transparency. The mission emphasizes European unity and the protection of European and international economic interests, with an added emphasis on trust and freedom of navigation. EMASoH complies with international law, including the United Nations Convention on the Law of the Sea (UNCLOS). It works with other nations, especially the coastal nations in the Strait of Hormuz, and with various international organizations such as the International Maritime Security Construct.

The EMASoH mission primarily protects the contributing EMASoH-participating nation flagged ships. It is possible that the mission protects non-EMASOH flagged ships because a ship may be managed, owned, or operated by companies who are tied to one of these countries.

==== Senior Civilian Representative ====
The Senior Civilian Representative leads the Diplomatic Mission of EMASOH. The representative is chosen by EMASOH's member-countries. The purpose of the representative is to contribute to EMASoH's diplomacy pillar of de-escalation and increased maritime security in the region.

Time Period	Representative	Country of origin
17 February 2020 – August 10, 2020	Jeannette Seppen	Netherlands
August 10, 2020 – August 31, 2021	Julie Elisabeth Pruzan- Jørgensen	Denmark
1 September 2021 – present	Jakob Brix Tange	Denmark

=== Military Pillar - AGENOR ===
AGENOR is the military track/pillar of EMASoH. It has a goal to strengthen EMASoH countries' understanding in the area and ensure that ship traffic is free flowing. The operation usually consists of two deployed ships, a maritime surveillance aircraft with leadership based in the operations headquarters in Abu Dhabi.

The area of operation for AGENOR is the Strait of Hormuz, the Arabian Sea, the Persian Gulf, and the Gulf of Oman.

In the past three years, operation AGENOR has had 33 different assets contribute to the operation: ships, French Atlantique 2 maritime patrol aircraft, and Italian MQ9 drones. Since the establishment of operation AGENOR in 2020, there has been more than 2000 flight hours, 1070 days spent at sea and over 1600 ships reassured.

==== Force Commander ====
Time Period	Force Commander	Country of origin
20 January 2020 - 20 May 2020	Rear admiral Eric Janicot	France
20 May 2020 - 1 September 2020	Commander Ludivic Poitou	France
1 September 2020 - 13 January 2021	Commander Christophe Cluzel	France
13 January 2021 - 17 April 2021	Flotilla Admiral Carsten Fjord-Larsen	Denmark
17 April 2021 - 15 July 2021	Flotilla Admiral Anders Friis	Denmark
15 July 2021 - 9 January 2022	Commander Bruno de Vericourt	France
9 January 2022 - 1 March 2022	Commander Nicolas du Chéné	France
1 March 2022 - 6 July 2022	Rear admiral Tanguy Botman	Belgium
6 July 2022 - 27 January 2023	Rear admiral Stefano Costantino	Italy
27 January 2023 – 9 June 2023	Read admiral Renaud Flamant	Belgium
9 June 2023 - 7 December 2023	Rear admiral Mauro Panebianco	Italy
7 December 2023 - 8 March 2024	Rear admiral Hans Huygens	Belgium
8 March 2024 - present	Rear admiral Gilles Colmant	Belgium

== Activities ==
=== Voluntary Reporting Scheme ===
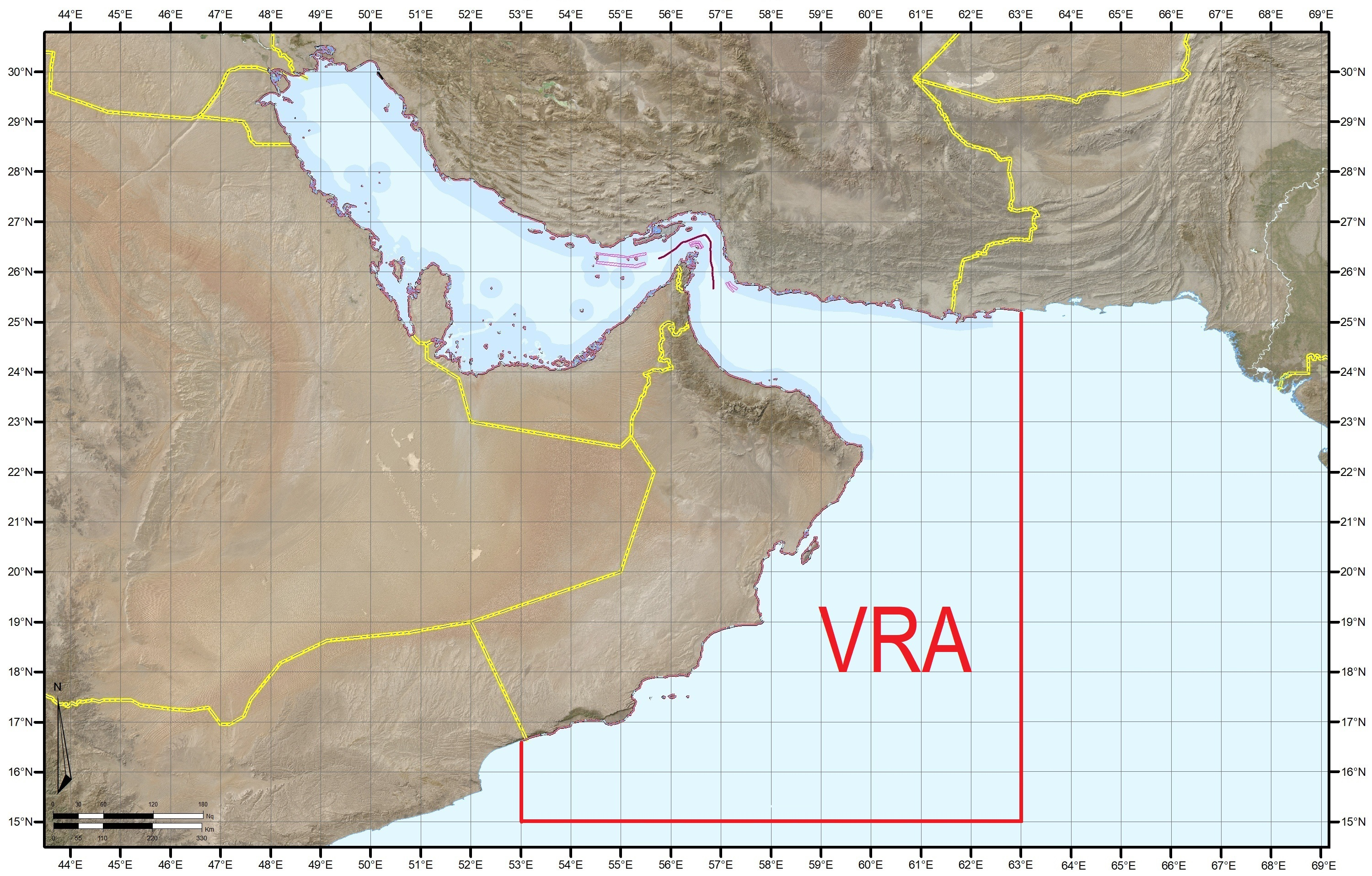
EMASOH Voluntary Reporting Area (VRA)

EMASoH's Voluntary Reporting Scheme is an initiative where ships can voluntarily report they are located in the Voluntary Reporting Area (VRA), which is the entire Persian Gulf, the Strait of Hormuz, and a part of the Arabian Sea. EMASoH reports that this improves the safety and stability of the area, and if a ship voluntarily reports itself, it has priority to be accompanied by EMASoH's ships and aircraft through its journey in the VRA.

=== Automatic Identification System (AIS) Data ===
EMASoH gathers and analyzes the AIS data in the region to understand the flow of shipping traffic and patterns of life in the area. The data is analyzed to find the most used destinations and routes, distribution of traffic, and look at the incoming and outgoing traffic of ships. This initiative primarily focuses on European (including Norway) flagged and/or country of financial benefit ships.

=== Reassure Maritime Shipping ===
Reassuring maritime merchant ships transiting the Strait of Hormuz, the Persian Gulf region, and the Arabian Sea is one of the main activities of Operation AGENOR. This includes accompanying merchant vessels while they are in the Strait of Hormuz, guidance of shipping with specialized officers as point of contact for merchant ships, EMASoH maneuver calls (EMMA calls), and surveillance using naval and aerial assets to assess the safety situation.

== Contributing Countries ==
=== Belgium ===
Belgium has supported EMASoH-AGENOR by sending Belgian frigate BNS Leopold I in April 2021. Belgium also contributes with staff members. The previous Force Commander was Belgian Navy Rear Admiral Renaud Flamant.

=== Denmark ===
Denmark has been sending staff officers starting from 2020. From August to December 2020, Denmark contributed by sending out frigate HDMS Iver Huitfeldt, a MH-60R Seahawk naval helicopter, and soldiers from the military police and maritime special forces. In the first half of 2021, Denmark was in charge of the operation with a stationed commander and contributed significantly to the multinational staff. Iver Huitfeldt re-joined EMASoH again in August 2021 until November 202, after 74 days patrolling at sea. Throughout the entirety of 2022, Denmark has had two staff officers for the operation.

=== France ===
France led the mission's creation in 2020 and sends assets to operation AGENOR continuously. France has contributed with staff officers, force commanders, and multiple naval and aircraft assets throughout the mission's existence including: French destroyer FS Languedoc, Atlantique 2 Maritime Patrol Aircraft, FS Jean Bart, FS Guepratte, FS Chevalier Paul, Ulysse Echo, FS Surcouf, and FS Courbet.

=== Germany and Portugal ===
Germany and Portugal support EMASoH and AGENOR largely through symbolic, political support. Germany has not guaranteed support by sending naval or aircraft assets, but has not completely dismissed the idea.

=== Greece ===
Greece contributes to EMASoH and AGENOR by providing staff members and the HS Hydra.

=== Italy ===
Italy has contributed by sending staff members, having an Italian Force Commander lead EMASOH and through naval and aircraft assets. They sent frigate ITS Martinengo, UAV MQ-9 Reaper in October 2021, ITS Calrlo Bergamini (F590) in 2022, and ITS Thaon di Revel in 2023. Currently the Force Commander is Italian Navy Rear admiral Mauro Panebianco

=== The Netherlands ===
The Netherlands supports EMASoH and AGENOR by providing staff members and naval and aircraft assets. There have been several Dutch staff officers that have worked for the mission since the launch of EMASoH, working with operations, intelligence, logistics and legal matters. The country has also contributed with Royal Netherlands Navy frigate Zr.Ms. De Ruyter, which has advanced sensors and a multi-mission maritime helicopter.

=== Norway ===
Norway joined the EMASoH mission in September 2021 as the 9th European nation in the mission. Since September 2021, there have been various Norwegian officers stationed at the EMASoH headquarters in Abu Dhabi.

== Responses to the Mission ==
The EMASoH mission has reported that they have seen increased demand after around a year of operation. Ships have offered positive feedback and have expressed their appreciation for the reassurance EMASoH provides.

Most GCC monarchies have a positive view of EMASoH and see it as a deterrent to the Islamic Revolutionary Guard Corps (IRGC). Increased cooperation with France and European states has given them more space for increased political exposure with other states.

== Important Events ==
On 27 April 2023 and 3 May 2023 Iran seized two oil tankers named Advantage Sweet (Marshall Islands-flagged) and Niovi (Panama-flagged) in the Gulf of Oman and Strait of Hormuz. The Advantage Sweet vessel was sailing in international waters, while the Niovi was sailing outbound the Strait of Hormuz. EMASoH released a joint statement calling for the release of the vessels and stated the seizures put maritime safety and freedom of navigation at risk.

On 27 May 2022, Two Greek oil tankers were seized by Iran's Revolutionary Guards Corps in response to Greece impounding an oil tanker with Iranian oil on board while transiting in the Persian Gulf and international waters. EMASoH-participating countries called for the release of the crews and ships saying the seizure puts the safety and freedom of navigation in this region at risk. The ships and crews were released 16 November 2022.

On 27 December. 2022 – FS Guepratte was conducting a routine patrol towards the Strait of Hormuz for the EMASoH/AGENOR mission. A stateless dhow was spotted, intercepted, and searched where around 500 kg of heroin and 4 tons of cannabis were found.
