= Gulf of Oman incident =

Gulf of Oman incident may refer to:

- May 2019 Gulf of Oman incident
- June 2019 Gulf of Oman incident
- July 2021 Gulf of Oman incident
- August 2021 Gulf of Oman incident
