= U.S.–Iran naval incident =

U.S.-Iran naval incident refers to:

- 2008 U.S.–Iranian naval dispute
- 2016 U.S.–Iran naval incident
- 2021 U.S.–Iran naval incident
