= 2021 Gulf of Oman incident =

2021 Gulf of Oman incident may refer to:

- July 2021 Gulf of Oman incident, the attack on tanker Mercer Street near Oman
- August 2021 Gulf of Oman incident, the hijacking of tanker Asphalt Princess near Fujairah
