= 2019 Gulf of Oman incident =

2019 Gulf of Oman incident may refer to:

- May 2019 Gulf of Oman incident, damage to four commercial ships off Fujairah
- June 2019 Gulf of Oman incident, attacks on two oil tankers near the Strait of Hormuz
