= Iranian seizure of the tanker Talara =

2025 seizure of a Marshall Islands–flagged oil tanker

On 14 November 2025, the Talara, a Marshall Islands–flagged oil tanker owned by Pasha Finance Inc., while carrying a cargo of high-sulphur gasoil from Sharjah to Singapore was seized by Iran's Islamic Revolutionary Guard Corps (IRGC) about 22 miles (35 km) off Khor Fakkan and forced from Emirati waters into Iran's exclusive economic zone. It was later located deep inside Iranian waters in the Khuran/Clarence Strait. The IRGC justified the seizure by stating that it was "in line with safeguarding the interests and resources of the Iranian nation", in a statement to Mehr News, implying that it was an anti-smuggling operation. However, the IRGC posted a statement on X about "aggressing against those who aggress against you", suggesting that it was of a retaliatory nature, likely linked to the loss of the Iranian shadow-fleet LPG tanker Falcon, with the Talara's 30,000-tonne cargo seen as compensation.

== Background ==
During the years preceding the seizure, Iran was linked to a number of maritime attacks in the vicinity of the Strait of Hormuz, and the IRGC has seized a number of commercial vessels, often claiming that they were involved in smuggling or other maritime violations such as technical infractions or legal disputes.

On 13 June 2019, the Japanese tanker Kokuka Courageous and the Norwegian-owned Front Altair were attacked off the Gulf of Oman, when limpet mines attached to the hulls of the ships exploded. US Navy investigators stated that the limpet mines used closely match mines publicly displayed by Iran's IRGC, and that in an effort to remove incriminating evidence, IRGC forces returned after the attack to remove an unexploded mine from the Kokuka Courageous's hull, but left behind debris, fingerprints, and a distinctive mounting magnet. The damage to the Kokuka Courageous, consisted of a hole punched above the waterline through its double hull and nail marks where the malfunctioned mine was fixed, the Front Altair burned fiercely enough to be seen from space. Iran repeatedly denied any involvement.

On 24 October 2021, the Vietnamese oil tanker MV Sothys was seized by Iranian authorities, taken into the port of Bandar Abbas, and had its cargo of oil offloaded under an Iranian court order before being released. According to Iran's UN mission, the ship left Iranian waters only after transferring its oil to Iran, meaning Tehran effectively confiscated the cargo while letting the vessel go.

On 29–30 July 2021, the tanker MT Mercer Street was attacked off the Gulf of Oman by three explosive drones: the first two, launched on the evening of 29 July missed, but a third, launched early on 30 July and packed with military-grade RDX explosives, hit the ship's pilot house, blew a two-metre (6 ft 7 in) hole in it, and killed the Romanian captain and a British security guard. A US Navy explosives team from the USS Ronald Reagan examined debris, explosive residue, and recovered drone parts, and concluded that the unmanned aerial vehicle (UAV) used in the strike was produced in Iran, though Iran denied any role in the attack.

In May 2022, the IRGC seized two Greek-flagged oil tankers, Delta Poseidon and Prudent Warrior, in the Persian Gulf, taking their crews captive. In at least one case, an Iranian helicopter landed on the tanker in international waters off Iran's coast, armed men boarded, and then forced the vessel into Iranian waters; both ships had been carrying Iraqi crude oil and had recently operated near Qatar. The IRGC announced the seizures in an official statement and accused the tankers of committing violations, but did not specify which. Before the take-over, Iranian state-linked media openly warned that Iran intended to take "punitive action" over Greece as retaliation for their part in the Iranian oil seizure from the Iranian-flagged tanker Lana days earlier.

In November 2022, the Liberian-flagged oil tanker Pacific Zircon, associated with an Israeli shipping magnate, was struck off the coast of Oman by an explosive drone identified as an Iranian-made Shahed variant, in what was regarded as a deliberate Iranian attack on an Israeli-linked civilian vessel. The drone hit the tanker about 150 miles (240 km) off Oman while it was carrying gas oil, causing minor damage to the hull but no injuries, no pollution, and no loss of cargo, with all crew reported safe. The strike was attributed directly to Iran's drone program and part of a pattern of Iranian operations against Israeli-associated shipping in the region. Tehran did not acknowledged the attack and offered no alternative explanation for who launched the bomb-carrying UAV.

On 15 April 2024, the Portuguese-flagged container ship MSC Aries, operated by MSC and leased from Gortal Shipping, an affiliate of Zodiac Maritime, was seized by Iran's Revolutionary Guard in the Strait of Hormuz after Iranian forces boarded it by helicopter and diverted it into Iranian waters. Tehran claims the vessel was taken for "violating maritime laws" and not responding to Iranian authorities’ calls, while simultaneously stressing that the ship was linked to Israel, and seizing it just days after vowing retaliation for a suspected Israeli strike on its consulate in Damascus. The seizure was condemned as piracy and a breach of international law.

== Talara ==
The tanker Talara (IMO number: 9569994) is owned by Pasha Finance Inc., a subsidiary of the Pasha Group, owned for three generations by residents of California and unrelated to the Pasha Group associated with the family of the Azerbaijani president. According to The Maritime Executive, The ship is managed by Columbia Ship Management, a Cyprus-registered company owned by Captain Heinrich Leopold Felix Schoeller, a member of an aristocratic Austro-Czech dynasty, who is also a long time resident of Cyprus.

=== Incident ===
On 14 November 2025, Talara, a Marshall Islands-flagged oil tanker, was carrying a cargo of high-sulphur gasoil through the Indian Ocean en route to Singapore from Sharjah in the United Arab Emirates, when Iran's IRGC seized the ship by a helicopter boarding about 22 nautical miles (41 km; 25 mi) off Khor Fakkan in the UAE, then quickly forced it out of Emirati waters and into Iran's exclusive economic zone. Satellite imagery later located the tanker in Iran's Khuran/Clarence Strait, confirming it had been taken deep into Iranian-controlled waters.

The IRGC publicly framed the operation as "safeguarding the interests and resources of the Iranian nation", hinting at an anti-oil smuggling justification. However an IRGC social media post stated "whoever has aggressed against you, aggress against him like he has aggressed against you", reinforcing the idea that it was a retaliatory act. Analysts suggest that the claimed "law enforcement" against alleged Iranian smugglers may have been the motive for the operation, however, the Talara's observed activity and size are inconsistent with regional oil smuggling activity. Another possible motive for the seizure is the wish to exact payback for the recent loss of the Iranian shadow-fleet LPG tanker Falcon, which exploded and was abandoned after loading in Iran and sailing toward a Houthi-controlled Yemeni port. The 30,000-tonne cargo of Talara is said to be equivalent in value to that of the Falcon, and its seizure would be at the expense of the parties who Iran believes were responsible for the Falcon's explosion.

On 19 November 2025, The IRGC released the Talara and its crew after five days of custody, after unloading its 30,000 tonne cargo of gasoil in a ship-to-ship transfer near Bandar Abbas. The Fars News Agency reported that an "Iranian entity was behind the illegal transportation of the petrochemical cargo by Talara" and the seizure was not directed against a foreign country.

== See also ==
- June 2019 Gulf of Oman incident
- July 2021 Gulf of Oman incident
- August 2021 Gulf of Oman incident
- 2021 U.S.–Iran naval incident
- 2022 Iran–Greece naval incident
- Iranian seizure of the MSC Aries
