= 2022 Iran–Greece naval incident =

Seizures of ships

On 19 April 2022, the Iranian-flagged tanker Lana (formerly Pegas), with 19 Russian crew members on board, was seized by Greek authorities near the southern island of Evia; this sparked an international incident. Greek authorities had connected Russian sanctions imposed by the European Union after the Russian invasion of Ukraine in February to the tanker seizure in Greece.

On 25 May, Greece said that it would give the US 700,000 barrels of Iranian crude oil from a Russian-flagged vessel it had confiscated. Iran called the decision "international robbery". On May 27, Iran seized two Greek tankers, the Delta Poseidon and the Prudent Warrior, shortly after saying it would take "punitive action" against Greece. At least nine Greek nationals and one Cypriot were aboard the two tankers when they were seized.

== Background ==
Iran has seized oil tankers in the Persian Gulf and the Strait of Hormuz when ships carrying Iranian oil were halted or confiscated. After the UK stopped an Iranian tanker in Gibraltar in 2019, Iran took control of a British vessel. In a dispute over South Korea's decision to freeze its oil income in response to U.S. economic sanctions, Iran seized a South Korean tanker in 2020. Iranian naval troops have temporarily taken control of a Vietnamese tanker and a tanker flying the flag of Panama.

== Incident ==
In April 2022, port officials in Evia's Karystos district in Greece confiscated the Russian-flagged ship Pegas on orders from the Anti-Money Laundering Authority. Pegas had been carrying Iranian oil and was originally traveling through international waters in the Aegean, but sustained damage en route to the Peloponnese. The ship was seized because it belonged to the Russian Promsvyazbank, which was under EU sanctions. The Anti-Money Laundering Authority freed the Pegas three days later because it had been transferred to Transmorflot, a business not on the EU sanctions list, on 17 March.

On 20 April, the US Department of Justice asked for the cargo of Pegas to be frozen because its sale would fund terrorism. The US request was based on sanctions imposed on Iran when the Trump administration withdrew from the Joint Comprehensive Plan of Action in 2018. The EU and its member states, however, were still committed. Reuters reported that it was unclear if the cargo was seized because it was Iranian oil or because the tanker was subject to sanctions because of its connections to Russia. The US has separate sanctions for Iran and Russia.

In May, Iranian forces captured two Greek tankers, held the crew hostage in the Persian Gulf, and led the ships into Iranian waters. The action was taken after Greece said that it would turn over to the US 700,000 barrels of Iranian crude oil confiscated from a vessel flying the Russian flag.

== Aftermath ==
On 8 June, a Greek court overturned a previous ruling allowing the country to take a portion of the cargo aboard the tanker flying the Iranian flag near the Greek coast. According to a Greek port-police source, the seizure was lifted on 27 June and the Lana (formerly Pegas) was allowed to resume its voyage. According to sources familiar with the situation and Iran's embassy in Athens, an Iranian-flagged tanker was reloading oil seized by the US seized in April on 12 August after Greek authorities' approval of the cargo transfer.

== Reactions ==
The seizure of the two Greek-flagged vessels was denounced by the United States. The foreign ministries of Germany and France denounced the seizure of the Greek tankers, urging Tehran to free the vessels and their crews. The statements were called "biased" and "inappropriate intervention" by the Iranian administration. The Iranian seizure has been described as a threat to the safety of shipping and commerce by Greek Minister of Maritime Affairs and Insular Policy Ioannis Plakiotakis.

Supreme Leader of Iran Ali Khamenei said, "They steal Iranian oil off the Greek coast, then our brave men who don't fear death respond and seized the enemy's oil tanker". According to Sina Azodi, an Iran specialist at the Atlantic Council in Washington, the major goal was to make it clear to the West that any more seizures of oil ships would face a similar response.

Greece ultimately agreed to all Iranian demands, including a pledge to never again seize or harass any tankers transporting Iranian oil, as well as to provide a to be determined amount of financial compensation for broken sales contracts attributed to the earlier seized Iranian oil. Nevertheless, Iran continued to hold both the Greek ships and their crew for two additional months even after these demands were satisfied. It was not until nine weeks later, in August, that Teheran finally released its captives upon a suddenly added third demand, an official apology to Iran by the Greek government, was issued by Athens. As a result, the universal consensus was that Iran scored nothing less than a complete diplomatic and strategic victory at the expense of Greece.

== See also ==
- 2004 Iranian seizure of Royal Navy personnel
- 2007 Iranian arrest of Royal Navy personnel
- 2008 U.S.–Iranian naval dispute
- 2011–12 Strait of Hormuz dispute
- 2016 U.S.–Iran naval incident
- 2021 U.S.–Iran naval incident
- August 2021 Gulf of Oman incident
- Greece–Iran relations
- July 2021 Gulf of Oman incident
- Iranian seizure of the tanker Talara
