= 2021 United States–Iran naval incident =

Conflict between Iran and the United States

- Date: Unknown (the incident was reported on 25 October 2021)
- Location: Persian Gulf
- Motive: Thwarting an alleged attempt by the U.S. to capture and detain a tanker carrying Iranian oil (according to Iran's IRGC)
- Outcome: Seizure of Vietnamese flagged oil tanker and its consequent release without its original oil
- Footage: Official footage of the incident released by the IRGC

Iran's Islamic Revolutionary Guard Corps stated on 25 October 2021 that they had thwarted an attempt by the United States to capture and detain an tanker carrying Iranian oil in the Gulf of Oman by carrying out a heliborne operation and directing the ship back to Iran's territorial waters. The Pentagon rejected the Iranian statement and said that Iranian forces had seized a Vietnamese-flagged oil tanker in October.

It was later confirmed by the Vietnam officials that Iran had captured their oil tanker MV Sothys. After talks with the Iranian authorities, Sothys was released from the Bandar Abbas port on 11 November 2021 without "its original batch of oil." The IRGC public relations department said the release had been under warrant. IRGC released an official footage showing the tanker seizing operation.

== Background ==
Iran's crude oil exports were re-imposed sanctions by the United States after Donald Trump withdrew JCPOA. Either, Iran's exports sharply expanded, the data show, after the United States elections.

On 14 August 2020, the United States allegedly seized four Iranian fuel shipments bound for Venezuela. The confiscated shipments were reportedly bound for Houston, Texas. Washington described it as an action against flouting U.S. sanctions. According to The Wall Street Journal report, the U.S. forced Greek shipowners to surrender Iranian fuel to the U.S. government by threatening sanctions. Legal sources had previously told Reuters that the shipments could not be confiscated until they were in U.S. territorial waters.

Hojat Soltani, Iran's ambassador to Venezuela called it a big lie and wrote on Twitter: "Neither the ships are Iranian nor their owners or their cargo has any connection to Iran,".

== Incident ==
On 3 November 2021, Iran's Islamic Revolutionary Guard Corps (IRGC) stated that they thwarted an attempt by the United States to capture and detain a tanker carrying Iranian oil in the Gulf of Oman. The IRGC said in a media statement that "With the timely and authoritative action of the Guards’ naval forces, the US terrorist navy's operation to steal Iranian oil in the Sea of Oman failed." IRGC said in a statement on its website Sepahnews, that US forces had seized the tanker, carrying Iranian oil, and transferred the oil to another tanker and then moved it to an "unknown destination". According to the statement, IRGC naval forces, with air support, intervened by capturing the second tanker, "thwarting a second attempt by the US Navy to retake the vessel." US officials denied the Iranian account and said there had been no American aimed at seizing a tanker. The U.S. officials said that Iranian forces had actually seized a Vietnamese-flagged oil tanker last month while "two U.S. navy ships, backed by air support, had monitored the situation, but did not try to interdict the vessel." According to The Guardian, "if the American account is true, it is unclear why the Iranians would seek to board a vessel taking Iranian oil for export clandestinely towards Asia."

Vietnam later confirmed capture of its oil tanker, MV Sothys, with Vietnam's foreign minister saying they held talks with the Iranian authorities to resolve the issue. They also quoted oil tanker's captain as confirming on 27 October 2021 in Tehran that "all 26 members of the crew were in good health and were being well-treated." The Vietnamese oil tanker MV Sothys was released from the Bandar Abbas port on 11 November 2021 without "its original batch of oil."

According to Seyyed Mohammad Marandi, a Tehran-based analyst, the captured tanker was "one of four tankers carrying Iranian oil to Venezuela that had been seized by the United States in the Atlantic Ocean" in August 2019. "Now the tanker with the same captain & crew & under US military protection has been seized by the IRGC Navy," Marandi said in a tweet. This statement was rejected by a Pentagon spokesman.

== Aftermath ==
On 11 November 2021, Sothys, the Vietnamese oil tanker, was released after transferring the oil, according to spokesperson Shahrokh Nazemi speaking to the AP. Iranian state media said that the oil transfer from Sothys occurred under a court order.

=== Footage release ===
Iran celebrated its capture of the vessel in a footage aired on state television, showing IRGC special forces carrying out a heliborne operation and directing the ship back to Iran's territorial waters. The footage was released one day before the 42nd anniversary of the 1979 seizure of the U.S. Embassy in Tehran. The footage showed Iranian commandos heliboarding on a tanker. The tanker was then surrounded several IRGC speedboats and "a voice in English warned a U.S. ship to leave the area."

== Reactions ==
=== Iran ===
Hossein Salami, head of the IRGC, said: this event is "humiliation for an empire on the decline."

Admiral Alireza Tangsiri, head of the IRGC navy, called claims by US officials are incorrect and said: given that the distance of US ships was less than 98 feet (30 m) from Iranian vessels and forces, if they just wanted to monitor the situation, they could do it from long a distance or use aircraft and drones. Also, he claimed that the US was "prepared for a large operation" based on their earlier assessments.

=== United States ===
John Kirby, Pentagon spokesman, called this a bogus claim. He said: "The only seizing that was done was by Iran".

== See also ==
- 2016 U.S.–Iran naval incident
- 2004 Iranian seizure of Royal Navy personnel
- 2007 Iranian arrest of Royal Navy personnel
- 2008 U.S.–Iranian naval dispute
- 2011–12 Strait of Hormuz dispute
- July 2021 Gulf of Oman incident
- August 2021 Gulf of Oman incident
- 2022 Iran–Greece naval incident
- Iran–United States relations during the Biden administration
- Iranian seizure of the tanker Talara
