= 2019 Iranian shoot-down of American drone =

Military action in the Strait of Hormuz

- Part of 2019–2021 Persian Gulf crisis
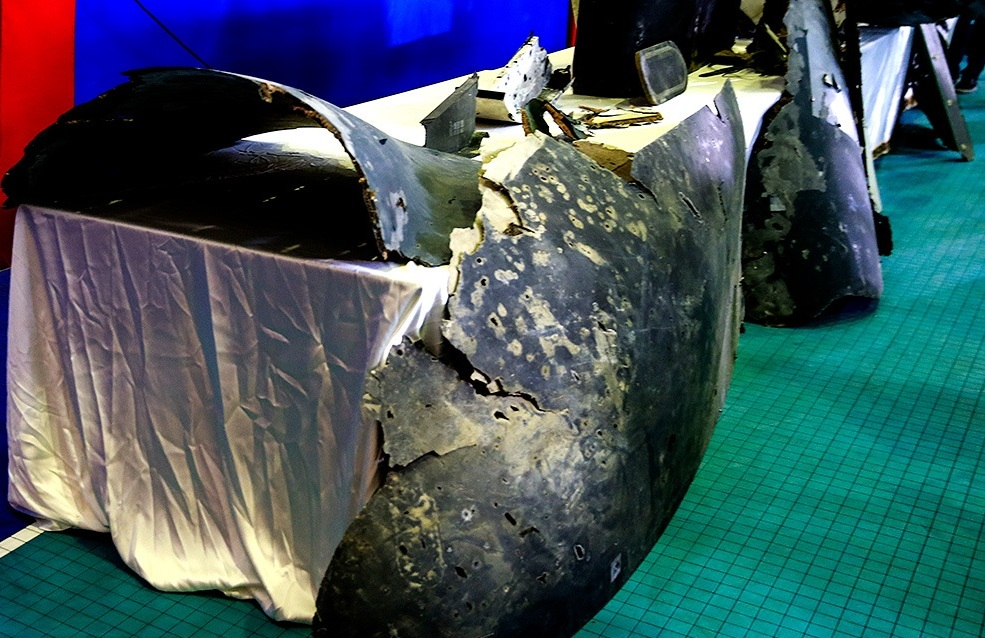
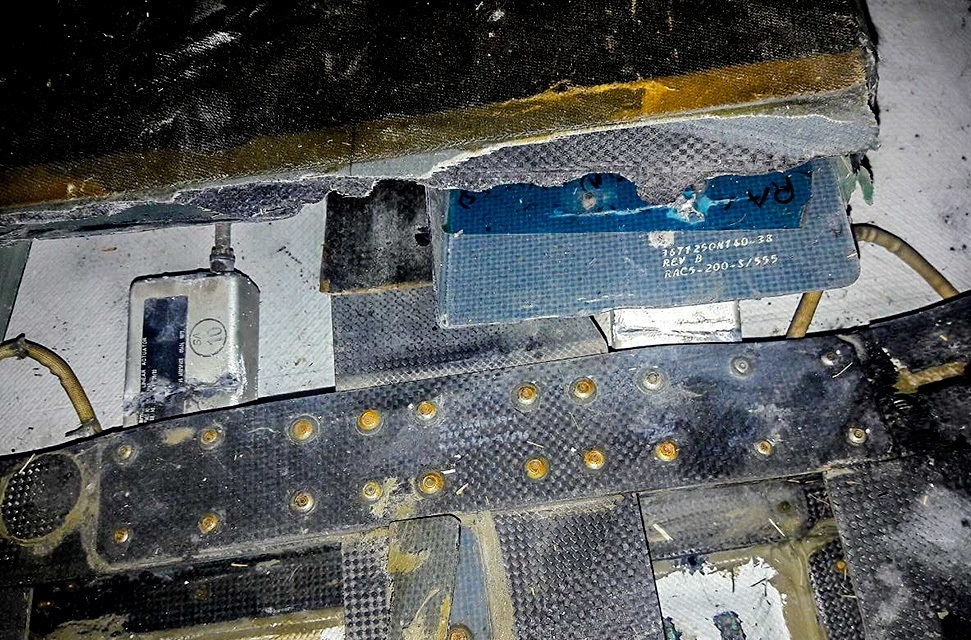
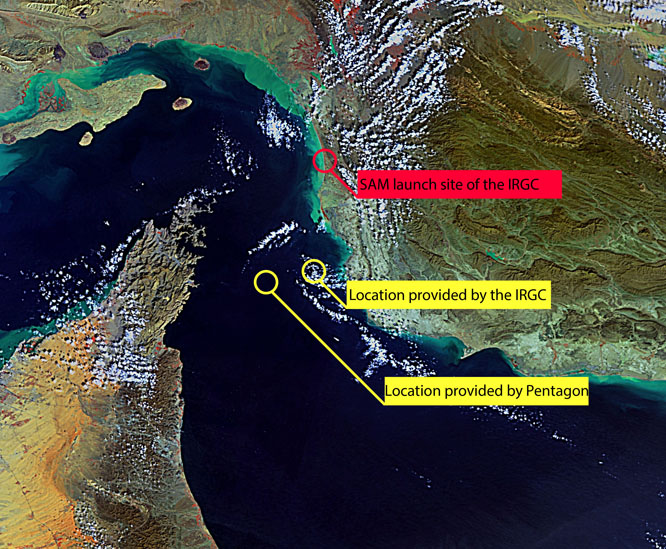
- Location: Strait of Hormuz
- Target: United States Northrop RQ-4A Global Hawk BAMS-D surveillance drone
- Date: June 20, 2019; 04:05 IRDT
- Executed by: Islamic Republic of Iran Army: Air Defense Force; Islamic Revolutionary Guard Corps: Aerospace Force
- Outcome: Drone destroyed

On June 20, 2019, Iran's integrated system of Air Defense Forces shot down a United States RQ-4A Global Hawk BAMS-D surveillance drone with a surface-to-air missile over the Strait of Hormuz. Iran and the U.S. differ on where the incident actually occurred. Iranian officials said that the drone violated their airspace, while U.S. officials responded that the drone was in international airspace.

The incident occurred amid rising tensions between the two countries and nearly resulted in an armed confrontation. U.S. President Donald Trump initially ordered a military strike against Islamic Revolutionary Guard Corps (IRGC) radar and missile sites before reversing the decision. Instead, the U.S. retaliated with cyberattacks on the IRGC's missile-control systems (which Iran says were firewalled), announced new sanctions against several Iranian nationals, and requested a closed-door UN Security Council meeting to address the regional tensions.

== Background ==
The U.S. has been flying surveillance drones in support of maritime security and to spy on Iran for many years. To abide by international law, such flights must take place in international airspace. Aside from the frequent legal reconnaissance flights, Iran has protested what it alleges are violations of its sovereign airspace. It has said that two U.S. spy drones crashed in Iran, a Shadow 200 (RQ-7), which it said crashed 37 miles (60 km) inside Iran in Ilam Province on July 4, 2005, and a Hermes drone near Khorramabad, about 125 miles (201 km) inside Iran, on August 25, 2005. A later program of secret drone flights within Iranian airspace, run by the American Central Intelligence Agency, came to light following Iran's capture of a stealth spy drone inside Iranian territory on December 5, 2011. The program entailed frequently sending stealth drones into Iran.

According to the U.S., the drone involved in the June 2019 incident was one of four Broad Area Maritime Surveillance-Demonstrator (BAMS-D) RQ-4 Global Hawks built as predecessors to the MQ-4C Triton, and operated by the U.S. Navy. The drone is believed to be the largest drone in the entire fleet of the U.S military. An MQ-4C Triton has a price of $182 million (including R&D costs).

The BAMS-D flies at high altitude, but is not a stealth variant aircraft, and does not carry munitions or defensive countermeasures.

== Incident ==
Infra-red video of the RQ-4A shoot-down from the U.S. Boeing P-8 Poseidon aircraft

Iranian Major General and IRGC commander Hossein Salami said that the drone took off at 00:14 local time from a U.S. military base south of the Persian Gulf and flew toward Chabahar. He alleged that, on its return journey, it violated Iranian airspace near the Strait of Hormuz. Iranian Foreign Minister Mohammad Javad Zarif said that the drone was at 25°59′43″N 57°02′25″E when it was targeted at 04:05 local time (23:35 GMT, June 19). These GPS coordinates put it at 8.3 nautical miles (15.3 km) off Iran's coast, within the 12 nautical miles (22 km) limit of its territorial waters (which also marks the limit of sovereign airspace under international law). According to Iran, the drone was struck by an Iranian-produced 3rd Khordad SAM located near Garuk, Hormozgan Province. However, citing a Pentagon official, Newsweek reported the missile as a Soviet-origin S-125 Neva/Pechora. Iranian forces displayed sections of the drone, which the foreign minister stated had been retrieved from Iranian territorial waters. According to TIME, smoke from the drone was seen as shown in a video by the U.S. military.

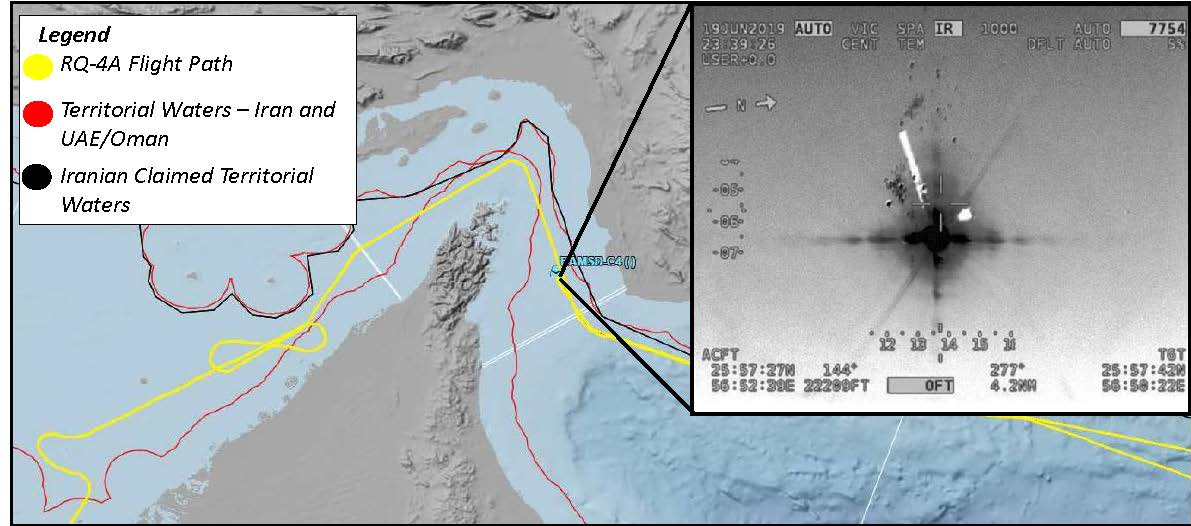
Map of the RQ-4A's flight path according to the American claim, along with an infra-red image (displayed as an inset) of an apparent explosion taken on June 19, 2019, at 23:39:26 GMT. Images provided by United States Central Command.

The Iranian account of the drone's location at the time of the shoot-down was contested by the United States. The commander of United States Air Forces Central Command, Air Force Lieutenant General Joseph Guastella, said the "closest that the drone got to the Iranian coast was 21 miles." Later, U.S. Central Command issued a map of the RQ-4A's flight path, showing the attack position as several miles outside Iran's territorial waters. It also released an infra-red image of an apparent explosion destroying the RQ-4A taken from another aircraft at 25°57′27″N 56°52′39″E, 17.3 nautical miles (32.0 km) off Iran's coast. The New York Times, citing a senior official in the Trump administration, reported that there were some doubts inside the administration about whether the drone and a Boeing P-8 Poseidon manned aircraft had indeed avoided Iranian airspace throughout their entire flights. Brig. Gen. Amir Ali Hajizadeh, the commander of the Islamic Revolutionary Guard Corps Aerospace Force, said that the U.S. was warned twice about the infringement of Iran's territorial limit and stated, "When it did not redirect its route and continued flying toward and into our territory, we had to shoot it at 4:05 a.m. Our national security is a red line." Hajizadeh also talked about the manned American P-8 plane over Iran's territory, saying "With the U.S. drone in the region there was also an American P-8 plane with 35 people on board. This plane also entered our airspace and we could have shot it down, but we did not."

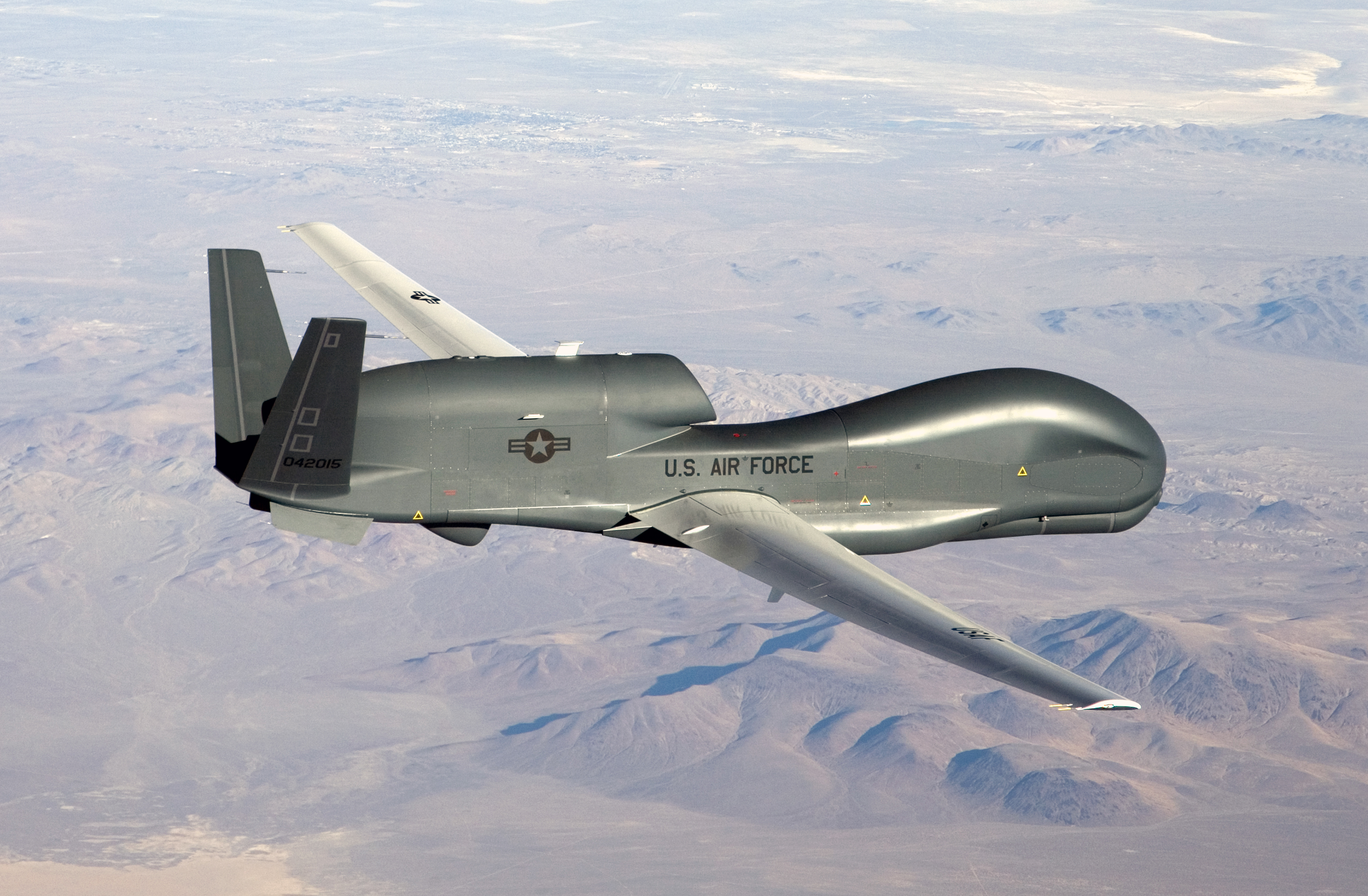
An RQ-4 Global Hawk similar to that downed by Iran.

Iranians stated that the P-8 had heeded warnings and moved further off the Iranian coast. The P-8 is a naval aircraft that the U.S. uses for surveillance and is armed with weapons to destroy ships and submarines. Hours later, the Pentagon confirmed the presence of a P-8 Poseidon aircraft close to the incident.

U.S. President Donald Trump later echoed Hajizadeh's statement regarding the P-8:

There was a plane with 38 people yesterday, did you see that? I think that’s a big story. They had it in their sights and they didn’t shoot it down. I think they were very wise not to do that. And we appreciate that they didn’t do that. I think that was a very wise decision.

On June 25, Russian Security Council Secretary Nikolai Patrushev echoed the Iranian account, stating Russian military intelligence showed that the U.S. drone was shot down in Iranian airspace. Patrushev said that Iran "has always been and remains our ally and partner".

== U.S. response ==
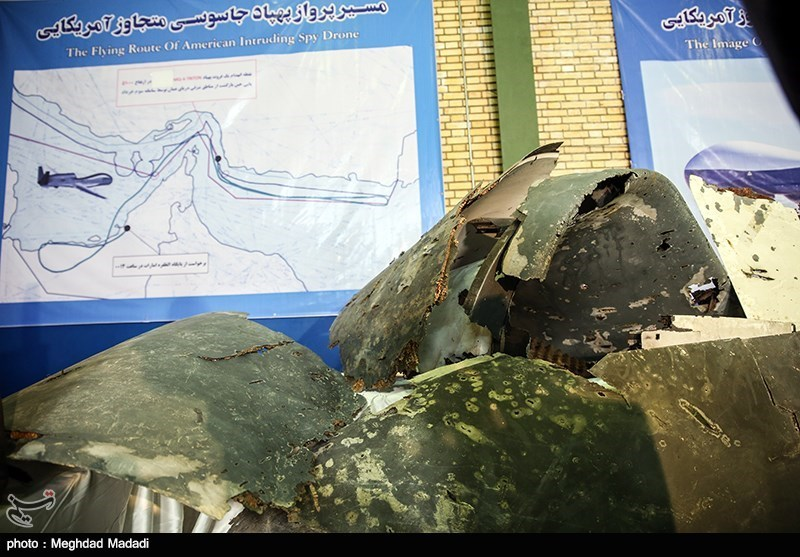
Alleged remnants of the RQ-4A drone. Image published by Tasnim News Agency

=== Aborted military response ===
Following the incident, President Donald Trump tweeted that Iran had made a "big mistake". The Federal Aviation Administration warned airlines of a "potential for miscalculation or misidentification" as numerous flights began to be diverted from the Tehran flight information region. The United States also requested a June 24 closed-door United Nations Security Council meeting to address the regional tensions with Iran, according to diplomats. Several hours later, The New York Times, citing "multiple senior administration officials involved in or briefed on the deliberations", reported that Trump had ordered a retaliatory military strike on several Iranian radar and missile sites, but then withdrew the order. Secretary of State Mike Pompeo, National Security Adviser John Bolton, and CIA Director Gina Haspel were reportedly in favor of a military response and objected to the reversal. Vice President Mike Pence initially supported limited military strikes but also agreed with the president's decision to halt them.

Trump later confirmed that he aborted an attack, tweeting that he was in "no hurry" to attack Iran and halted his order "10 minutes before the strike" because it was only then that he learned that Iranian casualties were estimated to be 150 killed, which he said was "not proportionate to shooting down an unmanned drone". In an interview with NBC News, he expounded on his decision-making process, saying that though the strike package was "cocked and loaded", he had not given final approval to the operation and added that no warplanes had taken off before the reversal. He reiterated that he did not desire war with Iran and was open to unconditional talks with Iranian leadership, but affirmed that they "can't have nuclear weapons" and warned that in the event of a conflict there would be "obliteration like you've never seen before".

A June 22 article in The Wall Street Journal, citing unidentified administration officials close to internal deliberations, reported that, privately, Trump bemoaned the cost of the downed drone – around $130 million (not including R&D) – but said that the loss would pale in comparison in the eyes of U.S. citizens to potential Iranian casualties. One source said the collateral damage estimate of 150 killed came from the White House, not the Pentagon, which two others said guessed lower. The WSJ report also stated that Chairman of the Joint Chiefs of Staff Joseph Dunford cautioned against a strike, significantly influencing Trump's decision.

In leaked diplomatic documents, UK ambassador to Washington Kim Darroch questioned Trump's claim that he had aborted the missile strike because it would have caused 150 casualties, saying it "doesn't stand up". "It's more likely that he was never fully on board and that he was worried about how this apparent reversal of his 2016 campaign promises would look come 2020," Darroch posited.

On June 23, Bolton warned Iran to not "mistake U.S. prudence and discretion for weakness" and that "no one has granted them a hunting license in the Middle East. Our military is rebuilt, new and ready to go."

On June 27, a week after the incident, U.S. Air Force Chief of Staff David Goldfein confirmed that U.S. drone operations in the region were continuing unabated despite the shoot-down. The day prior, he also downplayed the regional tensions at the time, saying he did not see a "significant change" in the Iranian military's defensive posture or capabilities.

=== Cyberattacks and sanctions ===
On June 22, it was reported that Trump had approved cyberattacks intended to disable IRGC computer systems used to control rocket and missile launches the day of the shoot-down. The cyber strikes were in development "for weeks if not months" and handled by U.S. Cyber Command in conjunction with U.S. Central Command. It represented the first offensive show of force since Cyber Command was elevated to a full combatant command in May 2018. Also on June 22, the U.S. Department of Homeland Security issued a warning to U.S. industries that Iran was stepping up cyberattacks on critical industries — particularly oil, gas, and other energy sectors — and government agencies, and have the potential to disrupt or destroy systems.

On June 24, Trump announced new targeted sanctions in Executive Order 13876 against Iranian and Revolutionary Guard Corps leadership, including Supreme Leader Ali Khamenei and his office. IRGC targets included Naval commander Alireza Tangsiri, Aerospace commander Amir Ali Hajizadeh and Ground commander Mohammad Pakpour. The sanctions also targeted the commanders of the IRGC Navy's five districts: Abbas Gholamshahi, Ramezan Zirahi, Yadollah Badin, Mansour Ravankar, and Ali Ozma'i. The sanctions largely froze any assets under U.S. jurisdiction, blocked the targeted leaders from dollar-denominated transactions, and barred international banks from moving money on their behalf. U.S. Treasury Secretary Steven Mnuchin said the sanctions would block "literally billions" in assets and that Iranian Foreign Minister Javad Zarif would also be sanctioned within the week. Zarif was later sanctioned on July 31.

Also on June 24, Iranian Information and Communications Technology Minister Mohammad-Javad Azari Jahromi said the cyberattacks were firewalled, commenting "They try hard, but they have yet to carry out a successful attack." This followed a report in The New York Times, citing current and former officials, saying the Trump administration was urging U.S. military and intelligence officers to develop new methods for unconventional clandestine operations against Iran, to avoid using conventional military options.

== See also ==
- Attacks on the United States
- June 2019 Gulf of Oman incident
- May 2019 Gulf of Oman incident
- Ukraine International Airlines Flight 752
- Iran Air Flight 655
- Iran–U.S. RQ-170 incident
