= 2016 United States–Iran naval incident =

Maritime incident in the Persian Gulf

Date	12 January 2016, 5:10 p.m
Location	Persian Gulf 27°59′35″N 50°10′21″E
Result	American sailors released unharmed 15 hours later after negotiations

Belligerents
United States	Iran

Commanders and leaders
(United States) Cmdr. Eric Rasch (executive officer of CRS-3)	(Iran) Cpt. Ahmad Dolabi

Units involved
United States Armed Forces; United States Navy; Fifth Fleet; Task Force 56; CTG 56.7; Coastal Riverine Squadron 3 (CTS-3); United States Coast Guard; Patrol Forces Southwest Asia; USCGC Monomoy (WPB-1326) (Conducted Combat Search and Rescue efforts and escorted the RCBs once released)	Iranian Armed Forces; Islamic Revolutionary Guard Corps; IRGC Navy; 2nd Zone; 214th "Hazrat-e Amir" Special Force Flotilla; Border Guard Command

Strength
10 servicemembers, 2 Riverine Command Boats	4 small boats

Casualties and losses
10 captured, 2 boats seized (sailors released)	None
- Location of Farsi Island in Persian Gulf

On January 12, 2016, two United States Navy riverine command boats were seized by Iran's Islamic Revolutionary Guard Corps (IRGC) Navy after they entered Iranian territorial waters near Iran's Farsi Island in the Persian Gulf. Initially, the U.S. military claimed the sailors inadvertently entered Iranian waters owing to mechanical failure, but it was later reported that they entered Iranian waters because of navigational errors.

U.S. Secretary of State John Kerry called Iranian foreign minister Mohammad Javad Zarif within five minutes, the first of a series of phone calls between the two. The sailors had a brief verbal exchange with the Iranian military and were released, unharmed, 15 hours later.

The release was hailed by the Obama administration as an unintended benefit of the new diplomatic relationship. Iran released pictures of captured U.S. sailors. Some U.S. Republican 2016 presidential candidates such as Ted Cruz, Marco Rubio, and Donald Trump criticized the U.S. response to the detention, which they deemed too weak.

== Incident ==
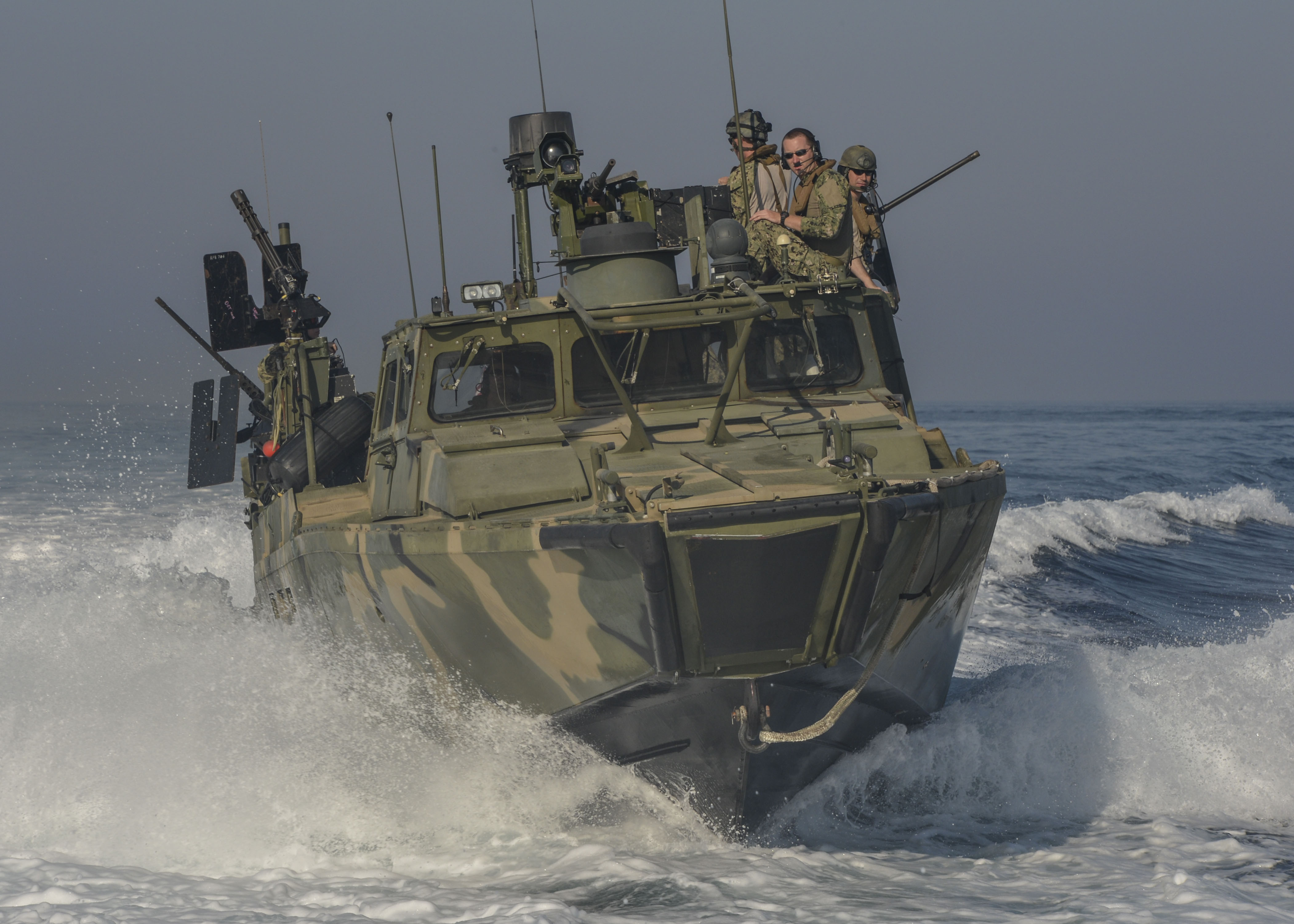
A U.S. Navy riverine command boat in the Persian Gulf in 2013.

On January 12, 2016, two United States Navy riverine command boats (RCBs) cruising from Kuwait to Bahrain with a combined crew of nine men and one woman on board strayed into Iranian territorial waters which extend three nautical miles around Farsi Island in the Persian Gulf. Patrol craft of Iran's Islamic Revolutionary Guard Corps (IRGC) Navy seized the craft and detained the crew at a military base on Farsi Island.

According to military sources, the two RCBs were on a routine transit from Kuwait to Bahrain, which serves as the home port for Task Force 56 under the Fifth Fleet. They left Kuwait at 12:23 p.m local time and were scheduled to refuel with the U.S. Coast Guard Island-class patrol cutter USCGC Monomoy at 5 p.m. During the transit one RCB developed an engine problem, and both boats stopped to solve the mechanical issue. During this time they drifted into Iranian waters. At 5:10 p.m. the boats were approached by the two small Iranian center-console craft followed by two more boats. There was a verbal exchange between the Iranian and U.S personnel and the officer commanding the RCBs allowed the Iranian sailors to come aboard and take control. The Iranian forces made the sailors kneel with their hands behind their heads. The RCBs reported their engine failure to Task Force 56, and all communications were terminated after the report. A U.S. search-and-rescue effort was launched leading to "robust bridge-to-bridge communications" with Iranian military vessels, wherein the Iranians informed U.S. Navy cruiser USS Anzio at 5:15 p.m that "the RCBs and their crew were in Iranian custody at Farsi Island and were safe and healthy." By the time a search-and-rescue effort got under way (it included sending a U.S. Navy and U.S Coast Guard vessel inside Iranian territorial waters over concern U.S. sailors could have been lost overboard), the sailors were already ashore.

John Kerry spoke with Iranian foreign minister Mohammad Javad Zarif at least five times by telephone. John Kerry stated that in his other phone calls about the situation he "made it crystal clear" how serious it was and that "it was imperative to get it resolved." The sailors had a brief verbal exchange with the Iranian military and were released unharmed along with all their equipment the next day on January 13 after 15 hours, and they departed the island at 08:43 GMT on their boats. They later were escorted by a U.S Coast Guard patrol cutter, while U.S. Navy overwatched and supported. The Pentagon oversaw the escort on high alert.

The IRGC stated that they released the sailors after their investigation concluded the "illegal entry into Iranian water was not the result of a purposeful act."

At first it was suggested that a mechanical failure in at least one of the boats led them to the Iranian waters, then it was verified that both boats returned to base under their own power. However, American military officials could not explain how they had lost contact with both of the boats.

The commander of Iran's Revolutionary Guards naval forces claimed that the U.S. apologized to Iran for the incident. However, the U.S. government has stated that no apology was made.

According to the Fars News Agency on January 26, "the American ships were 'snooping' around in Iranian waters," on the basis of the sailors' GPS data collected by the Islamic Revolutionary Guards Navy. On January 29 Fars News Agency stated "it was proved that the US marines had strayed into Iranian waters only due to the failure of their navigation devices and equipment."

U.S. Central Command stated, "A post-recovery inventory of the boats found that all weapons, ammunition and communication gear are accounted for minus two SIM cards that appear to have been removed from two handheld satellite phones." The statement did not account for navigation equipment. A Navy command investigation continues and more details will be provided when it is completed.

Tasnim News Agency reported Islamic Revolutionary Guards Navy Commander Admiral Ali Fadavi said in a February 1 parliamentary session, "We have extracted extensive information from their [American sailors'] laptops and cell phones," and that the information can be made public if a decision is made to that effect.

According to the IRGC, when the Iranian forces seized the two boats, aircraft carriers USS Harry S. Truman and Charles de Gaulle had been patrolling in the international waters southeast and northeast of Farsi Island, respectively, which IRGC Navy commander Ali Fadavi described it as "unprofessional behavior for forty minutes."

According to Brigadier General Farzad Esmaili, commander of Khatam al-Anbia Air Defense Base, after the IRGC Navy reported the capture of the U.S. Navy boats, the Air Defence switched on its missile systems and the Air Force fighter jets also scrambled. Three American F-18 fighters, a radar plane and a maritime patrol aircraft flew over the U.S. aircraft carriers and began to approach Farsi Island, conducted "bullying" behavior, and refused to respond to the signals, but made a contact later when the Iranian missiles zeroed on them and realized that they had "less than 30 seconds to decide before Iran's missiles are fired."

== Treatment of American military personnel ==
Seven of the sailors were interrogated while in custody of the Islamic Revolutionary Guard Corps Navy. On the same day the American crewmembers were released with their vessels, Iran released a series of images and videos that, among other things, showed the U.S. Navy sailors on their knees with their hands clasped behind their heads as they were being apprehended on their vessels. Two of the videos featured one of the Americans, apparently the Navy lieutenant commanding the boats, apologizing and praising Iran's treatment: "It was a mistake that was our fault, and we apologize for our mistake.... The Iranian behavior was fantastic while we were here and we thank you very much for your hospitality and your assistance." According to Politico, these pictures and footage further "inflam[ed] the American debate over [the sailors'] capture, including the question of whether the U.S. had formally apologized for entering Iranian territory." A Defense Department official said that the lieutenant's filmed apology was probably intended to defuse a potentially volatile situation.

== Reaction ==
=== Iran ===
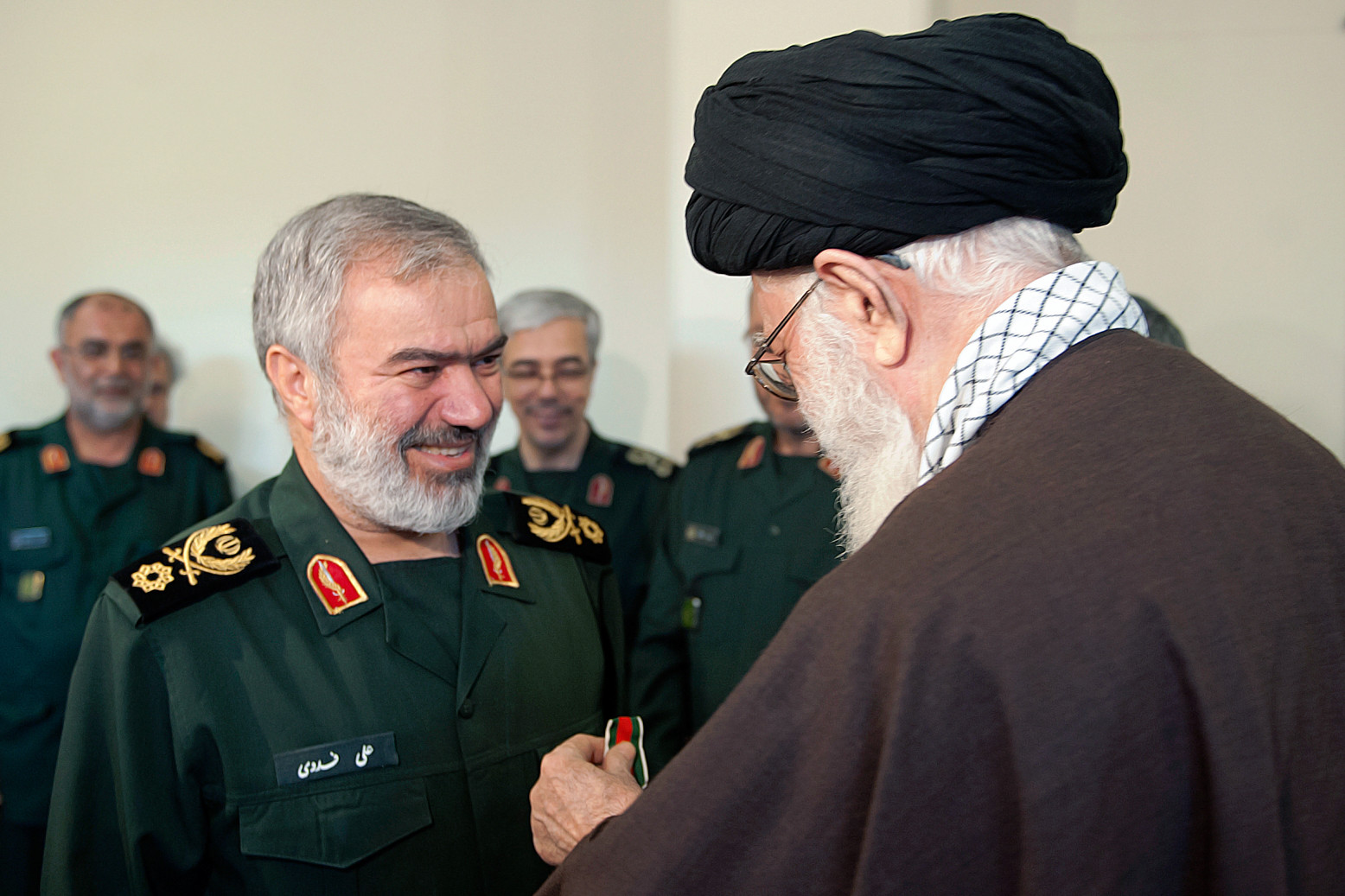
General Ali Fadavi receiving the Order of Fath from the Supreme Leader of Iran.

- Iranian Armed Forces: Hossein Salami, Deputy Commander of the IRGC said that the Americans started crying during the detention and that no country has ever captured American service members since the Second World War. Ahmad Dolabi, commander of the IRGC unit that detained the American vessels said that the U.S. Navy personnel surrendered although they had all their weapons intact. Hassan Firouzabadi, Chief of Staff of the Iranian Armed Forces remarked that this latest incident may not be the last.
- Supreme Leader Ayatollah Ali Khamenei awarded a Fath military medal to Commander of the IRGC Navy Rear Admiral Ali Fadavi as well as four others involved in the capture, thanked them for their efforts and sanctioned their actions.
- Foreign minister Mohammad Javad Zarif posted on Twitter that he was happy to see that dialogue and respect swiftly resolved the episode.

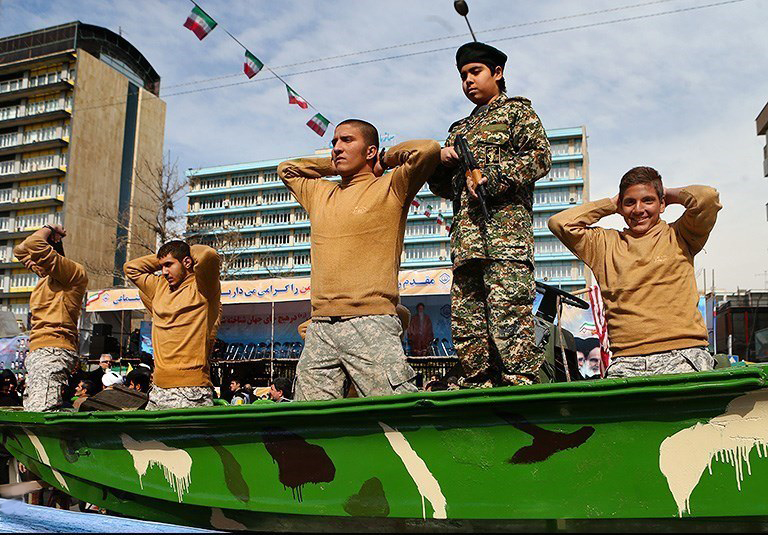
Simulation of the arrest of American sailors involved in the 2016 U.S.–Iran naval incident, on the 38th anniversary of the Iranian Islamic Revolution.

- On the 38th anniversary of the Iranian Islamic Revolution, teenagers were dressed like American sailors and held in a submissive manner to simulate the arrest of American sailors. Some Iranians reacted to it via social networks by criticizing the action and calling it "bizarre" and a "circus". According to the Iranian newspaper irdiplomacy, some social media websites are blocked in Iran so these reactions are not "broadly representative of views inside the country."

=== United States ===
Secretary of State John Kerry thanked Iranian authorities for their cooperation, adding that "we can all imagine how a similar situation might have played out three or four years ago." However, he later stated that he was angry at videos of U.S. sailors being used for propaganda. According to the Obama administration, the speedy release of the sailors "shows the power of diplomacy and the promise of its new engagement with Iran."

Commander Eric Rasch was the commanding officer of the squadron that included the ten captured sailors. On May 12, 2016, The U.S. Navy relieved Rasch of his command duties and reassigned him elsewhere. The Navy also relieved Capt. Kyle Moses, the commander of Task Force 56, and said he “demonstrated poor leadership by ordering the transit on short notice without due regard to mission planning and risk assessment.” The Navy also handed down punishments to one other officer and six enlisted sailors associated with the incident, for bringing embarrassment on the Navy for the errors that led to their arrest and for violation of US Navy code of conduct standards while in custody of the Islamic Revolutionary Guard Corps Navy.

== See also ==
- 2021 U.S.–Iran naval incident
- Iran–United States relations during the Obama administration
- 2004 Iranian seizure of Royal Navy personnel
- 2007 Iranian arrest of Royal Navy personnel
- 2008 U.S.–Iranian naval dispute
- 2011–12 Strait of Hormuz dispute
- Joint Comprehensive Plan of Action
