= Limpet mine =

Naval mine attached to a target by magnets

A limpet mine is a type of naval mine attached to a target by magnets. It is so named because of its superficial similarity to the shape of the limpet, a type of sea snail that clings tightly to rocks or other hard surfaces.

A swimmer or diver may attach the mine, which is usually designed with hollow compartments to give the mine just slight negative buoyancy, making it easier to handle underwater.

== Types of fuses ==
Usually limpet mines are set off by a time fuse. They may also have an anti-handling device, making the mine explode if removed from the hull by enemy divers or by explosions. Sometimes limpet mines have been fitted with a small turbine which would detonate the mine after the ship had sailed a certain distance, so that it was likely to sink in navigable channels (to make access difficult for other ships) or deep water (out of reach of easy salvage) and making determination of the cause of the sinking more difficult.

== Development ==
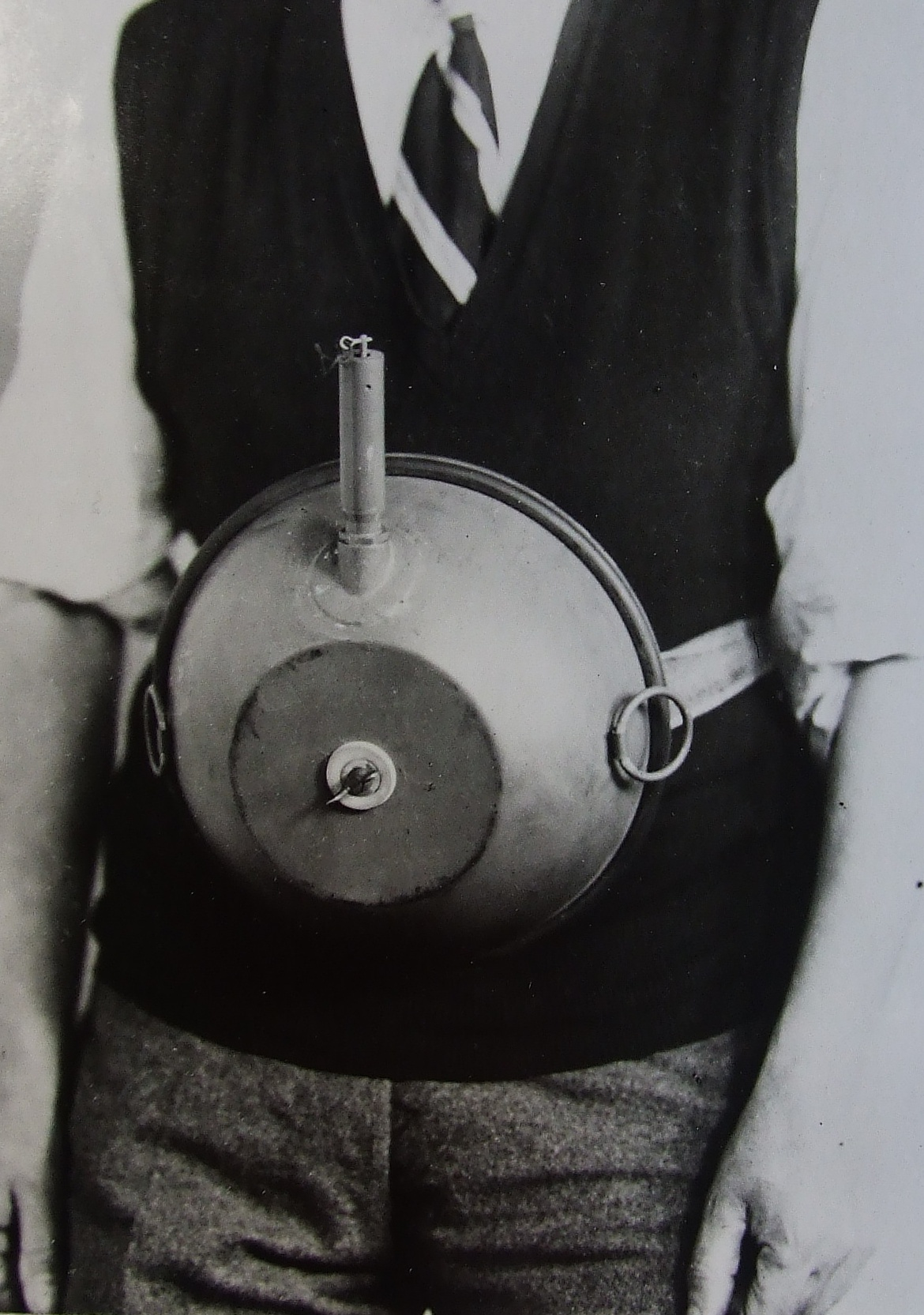
Cecil Vandepeer Clarke wearing an early version of the limpet mine on a keeper plate in the position used by a swimmer.

In December 1938, a new unit was created in the British military that soon became known as Military Intelligence (Research), which is sometimes abbreviated as MI(R) or occasionally as MIR. MI(R) absorbed a technical section that was at first known as MI(R)c. In April 1939, Joe Holland, the head of MIR, recruited his old friend Major Millis Rowland Jefferis as director of the technical section. Under his leadership the team developed a wide range of innovative weapons.

One of Jefferis' earliest ideas was a type of mine that could be towed behind a rowboat, which would attach itself to the hull of a ship that it passed. Getting a heavy bomb to stick to a ship reliably was a problem. The obvious answer was to use magnets, which should be as powerful as possible.

In July 1939, Jefferis read an issue of the popular magazine Armchair Science, which contained a small article on magnets:

The most powerful permanent magnet in the world—for its size—has been developed in the research laboratories of the General Electric Company in New York. Only half the size of the eraser on a lead pencil, it will lift a flat-iron weighing 5 pounds [2.3 kg]. Its magnetic attraction is several times as strong as that of any previous magnet. The strongly magnetic alloy forming the magnet can be used, too, in electrical equipment to replace electro-magnets that require current.

On 17 July 1939, Jefferis contacted magazine editor Stuart Macrae for more information about the magnets.

During World War I, Macrae had briefly worked on a device for dropping hand grenades from aircraft, and he longed for a return to working on such challenges. When Jefferis' call came, Macrae promptly undertook to perform experiments and to produce prototypes. He contacted Cecil Vandepeer Clarke, managing director of the Low Loading Trailer Company. Macrae had met Clarke a couple of years previously when he was the editor of The Caravan & Trailer magazine. He had been impressed by Clarke's work, and now he wanted his expertise and the use of his workshops in Bedford. Macrae and Clarke soon agreed to cooperate on the design of a new weapon, but they quickly abandoned a towed mine as impractical. Instead, they worked on a bomb that could be carried by a diver and attached directly to a ship. The new weapon became known as a limpet mine.

The first versions were assembled in a few weeks. Because of the time required to source the General Electric magnets from the United States, Macrae bought some toy horseshoe magnets from an ironmonger's shop, which were found to be adequate. The body of the prototype was a large metal kitchen bowl obtained from the Bedford branch of Woolworths and modified by a local tinsmith to retain the magnets around the rim. After much experimentation, it was found that the detonator could be actuated by a slowly dissolving aniseed ball sweet to provide the necessary time to escape. The sweets, which had initially been left in the workshop by Clarke's children, were the only substance tested which dissolved at a predictable rate. To protect this mechanism from damp which might cause premature detonation, it was covered by a condom which had to be removed before use. The prototype was tested in the swimming pool at Bedford Modern School, using a steel plate lowered into the deep end to simulate a ship's hull.

Just before war was declared, Macrae's name was put forward to Holland, who arranged to meet him. Holland considered that Macrae would make a good second in command for Jefferis: He saw Macrae as a capable administrator who could keep his geniuses in order. Macrae joined the War Office as a civilian and Holland saw to it that Macrae got a commission in October 1939 (backdated to 1 September).

Clarke joined the top secret Cultivator No. 6 project as a civilian and later joined the army. He served in the Special Operations Executive (SOE) with Colin Gubbins and was later Commandant of one of the Secret Intelligence Service's schools. He eventually rejoined Macrae when he was transferred to MD1 in 1942.

The "rigid limpets" used by the British during World War II contained only 4 1/2 pounds (2.0 kg) of explosive, but placed two metres (6.6 ft) below the waterline they made a wide hole in an unarmoured ship. SOE agents could be provided with a five-foot-long (1.5 m) placing rod.

A smaller version named "Clam" was developed from the British limpet for use on land. It was intended for use against tanks, but before the British got a chance to deploy it, the Germans adopted Zimmerit coating on their tanks, which prevented magnetic mines from sticking to the armor. This was because the Germans were the largest user of magnetic mines during the war, such as the Hafthohlladung or Hassenhuttl, a shaped-charge anti-tank grenade which attached magnetically to a target. They feared that the Soviets would easily reverse-engineer this weapon and use it against them. In the end, the Soviets didn't care for the idea of the magnetic mine, and the Germans stopped using Zimmerit for the last year of the war. The British limpet adaptation was not the first magnetic mine and was not the reason that Zimmerit coating was developed. However, the Clam was found to be useful for sabotage and was enthusiastically adopted by the SOE. Using only an 8 ounces (230 g) charge, it could easily be concealed in a coat pocket and was capable of destroying a vehicle or aircraft. Some 2.5 million Clams were manufactured by M.D.1, the successor to MI(R), during the war.

== Usage ==
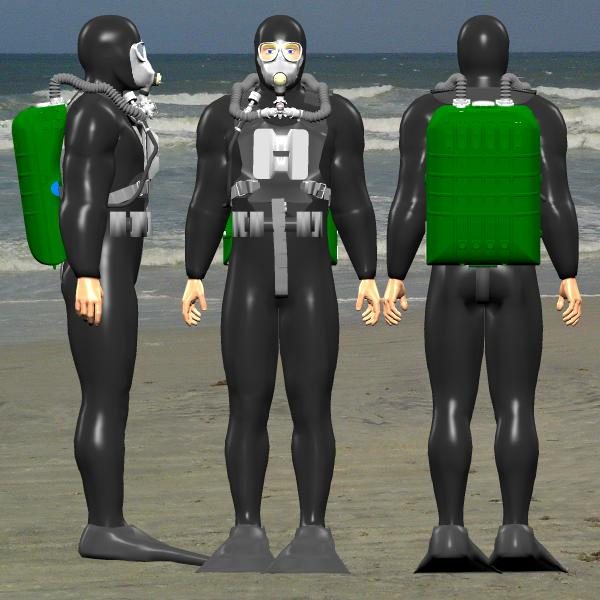
3 views of a frogman with a Soviet-designed IDA71 rebreather set, with keeper plate to clip a limpet mine to his chest.

=== Second World War ===
One of the most dramatic examples of their use was during Operation Jaywick, a special operation undertaken in World War II. In September 1943, 14 Allied commandos from the Z Special Unit raided Japanese shipping in Singapore Harbour. They paddled into the harbour and placed limpet mines on several Japanese ships before returning to their hiding spot. In the resulting explosions, the limpet mines sank or seriously damaged six Japanese ships, a tonnage of over 39,000 tons.

An example of the use of limpet mines by British special forces was in Operation Frankton which had the objective of disabling and sinking merchant shipping moored at Bordeaux, France in 1942. The operation was the subject of the film The Cockleshell Heroes.

Another case was the 1941 raid on Alexandria by six Italian Navy divers, who attacked and disabled two British Royal Navy battleships in the harbour of Alexandria, Egypt using limpet mines, having entered the harbor on the Maiale "manned torpedoes".

Limpet mines were used by the Norwegian Independent Company 1 in 1944 to attack the MS Monte Rosa. On 16 January 1945, 10 limpet mines were placed along the port side of the SS Donau approximately 50 centimetres (20 in) beneath the waterline. These bombs were to detonate once Donau cleared Oslofjord and reached open sea; however, the departure time was delayed and the explosion occurred before Donau reached Drøbak.

=== 1970s and 1980s ===
In the Bangladesh Liberation War in 1971, limpets were used by rebels in Operation Jackpot. In Mongla seaport, Bangladeshi naval commandos damaged many Pakistani army support ships and gunboats.

Egyptian limpets were modified by the CIA for use by the Mujahadeen in the 1979–89 Soviet–Afghan War to be attached to Soviet trucks.

In 1980, a limpet mine was used to sink Sierra, a whaling vessel docked in Portugal after a confrontation with the Sea Shepherd Conservation Society. Later that year, about half the legal Spanish whaling fleet was sunk in a similar fashion. There were no deaths.

Limpet mines were to be used in the plan of Operation Algeciras in the context of the 1982 Falklands War. Argentine frogmen were to place limpet mines on British ships in Gibraltar but they were discovered and the plan was foiled.

Another use was the sinking of the Rainbow Warrior by French DGSE agents in the Port of Auckland on 10 July 1985, killing one person.

=== 2019 Gulf of Oman incidents ===
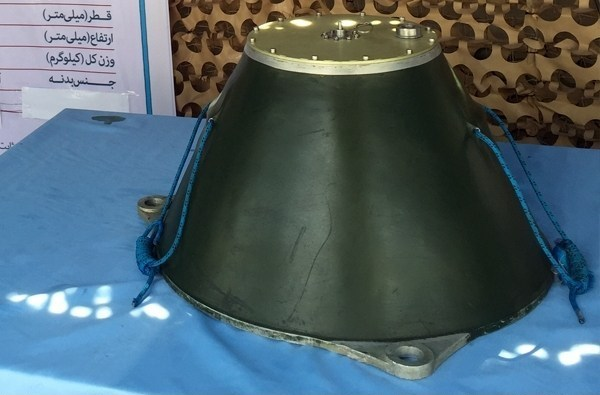
An example Iranian limpet mine, seen in 2015.

On 12 May 2019, four oil tankers in the Emirati port of Fujairah suffered damage from what appeared to be limpet mines or a similar explosive device. Preliminary findings of the investigation by the UAE, Norway, and Saudi Arabia concluded in June 2019, show that limpet mines were placed on oil tankers to explode as part of a sabotage operation.

On 13 June two subsequent blasts in the Straits of Hormuz damaged a Japanese and a Norwegian tanker, and were blamed on Iran by the U.S. military. A video was released which, according to the United States, shows an Iranian vessel removing an unexploded limpet mine from the starboard side of the Japanese vessel, several meters forward of the damaged area. The implications of an Iranian attack are disputed by the owner of the Japanese vessel and the Japanese government. The mines seemed to have been placed many feet above the waterline. The vessel's crew reported an unknown object flying towards them, then an explosion and a breach in the vessel. After this, the crew witnessed a second shot.

=== 2025 Mediterranean incidents ===
On 24 February 2025, Reuters reported that two oil tankers in the Mediterranean, which had recently called at Russian ports, had suffered damage consistent with an explosive device such as a limpet mine.

On 27 June 2025, a Greek oil tanker suffered damage from a limpet mine after having left a Libyan port, the fifth ship to have been damaged in such a manner as of August 2025.

=== 2026 Iran war ===
On 29 October, two limpet mines attached to the hull of a small craft disabled the Panamanian-flagged crude oil tanker Louise 1, which was manned by 27 Indian seafarers, 25 nautical miles northeast of Khasab, Oman. After an unsuccessful attempt using unexploded devices in September, the strike was the first successful use of adhesive limpet explosives in the Strait of Hormuz since the 2026 Iran war began. The explosions caused an engine room fire but did not result in any casualties or oil leaks.

== See also ==
- Hafthohlladung, a German magnetically-adhered, shaped-charge anti-tank mine
