= July 2021 Gulf of Oman incident =

Attack on an oil tanker in the Gulf of Oman

- Part of the 2019–2021 Persian Gulf crisis
- Date: 29 July 2021
- Location: Gulf of Oman, Indian Ocean
- Target: Merchant ship MT Mercer Street
- Deaths: 2 crew members killed
- Property damage: 1 merchant ship damaged
- Suspects: Iran (alleged by U.S., British, Israeli and Romanian officials; denied by Iran)

On 29 July 2021, the oil tanker MT Mercer Street, travelling from Tanzania to the United Arab Emirates (UAE) with no cargo on board, was attacked off the coast of Oman. The ship is flagged in Liberia. It is Japanese-owned and managed by Israeli-owned Zodiac Maritime, an international ship management company headquartered in London and led by billionaire shipping magnate Eyal Ofer, who is an Israeli citizen.

The United States Navy, which responded to assist the vessel, stated that it thought the attack came from a drone. Israeli, United States, British and Romanian officials blamed the attack on Iran. Iranian state media initially said the incident was in retaliation for an alleged Israeli airstrike on a military airport in Syria, but the Iranian government formally denied involvement.

The attack was preceded by two similar incidents that occurred in May and June 2019 and was followed by another in August 2021.

== Incident ==
On 29 July 2021, the oil tanker MT Mercer Street was attacked near the coast of Oman while sailing to the United Arab Emirates (UAE) from Tanzania. The ship suffered damage to its bridge, with the attack killing its Romanian national captain and a British national bodyguard.

The British military's United Kingdom Maritime Trade Operations said that the attack took place on Thursday night, 29 July, at a location just northeast of the Omani island of Masirah, nearly 300 kilometres (190 mi) southeast of Oman's capital, Muscat.

Initial Israeli assessment suggested that there were two attacks on the ship several hours apart, the second of which resulted in the fatalities. U.S. Navy vessels responded and escorted the ship to a safe location. In a statement on 31 July 2021, the U.S. Navy 5th Fleet said explosive experts believed a "drone strike" targeted the tanker, but the statement did not explain how that conclusion was determined.

== CENTCOM investigation ==
The US Central Command (CENTCOM) investigated the incident and concluded that Iran was behind the attack on the MT Mercer Street. It found that the ship was targeted by two unsuccessful explosive unmanned aerial vehicle (UAV) attacks on 29 July, both of which were reported by the crew via distress calls. A third UAV attack, on 30 July, significantly damaged the ship and resulted in the two deaths. The investigation found the third UAV was loaded with military-grade explosives, which created a 6-foot hole in the topside of the pilot house and badly damaged the interior.

== Reactions ==
U.S., British, Israeli and Romanian officials blamed Iran for the attack. Yair Lapid, Israel's Foreign Minister and Alternate Prime Minister, said he spoke with the British Foreign Secretary about the "need to respond severely" to the attack which he indirectly blamed on Iran.

Israeli Prime Minister Naftali Bennett said on 1 August that he knew with certainty that the ship was attacked by Iran and that Israel will respond to it. The same day, the British Foreign Secretary Dominic Raab said the UK and its allies were planning a coordinated response over the alleged Iranian attack. The next day, on 2 August, the Minister of Foreign Affairs of Romania Bogdan Aurescu strongly condemned Iran for the attack and said that "there is no justification whatsoever for deliberately attacking civilians" and that "we continue to coordinate with our partners for an appropriate response" to Iran. Additionally, the Iranian ambassador to Romania was urgently summoned at the Romanian ministry of foreign affairs at Bucharest.

On 6 August, foreign ministers from the G7 said "Iran's behavior, alongside its support to proxy forces and non-state armed actors, threatens international peace and security," and that "All available evidence clearly points to Iran. There is no justification for this attack."

Despite no immediate official reaction from Iran, the Iranian government's Arabic-speaking Al-Alam News Network cited unnamed "knowledgeable sources" who said the tanker was attacked as a response for the "latest Israeli airstrikes on Dabaa airport in Syria," which the Network said resulted in two unspecified casualties. Later, the Iranian government formally denied involvement in the incident and said it will respond to any threat.

== See also ==
- August 2021 Gulf of Oman incident
- November 2021 Gulf of Oman incident
- 2022 Iran–Greece naval incident
- 2023 attack on the Chem Pluto
- Iranian seizure of the tanker Talara
