= August 2021 Gulf of Oman incident =

Attack on an oil tanker named the Asphalt Princess in the Gulf of Oman

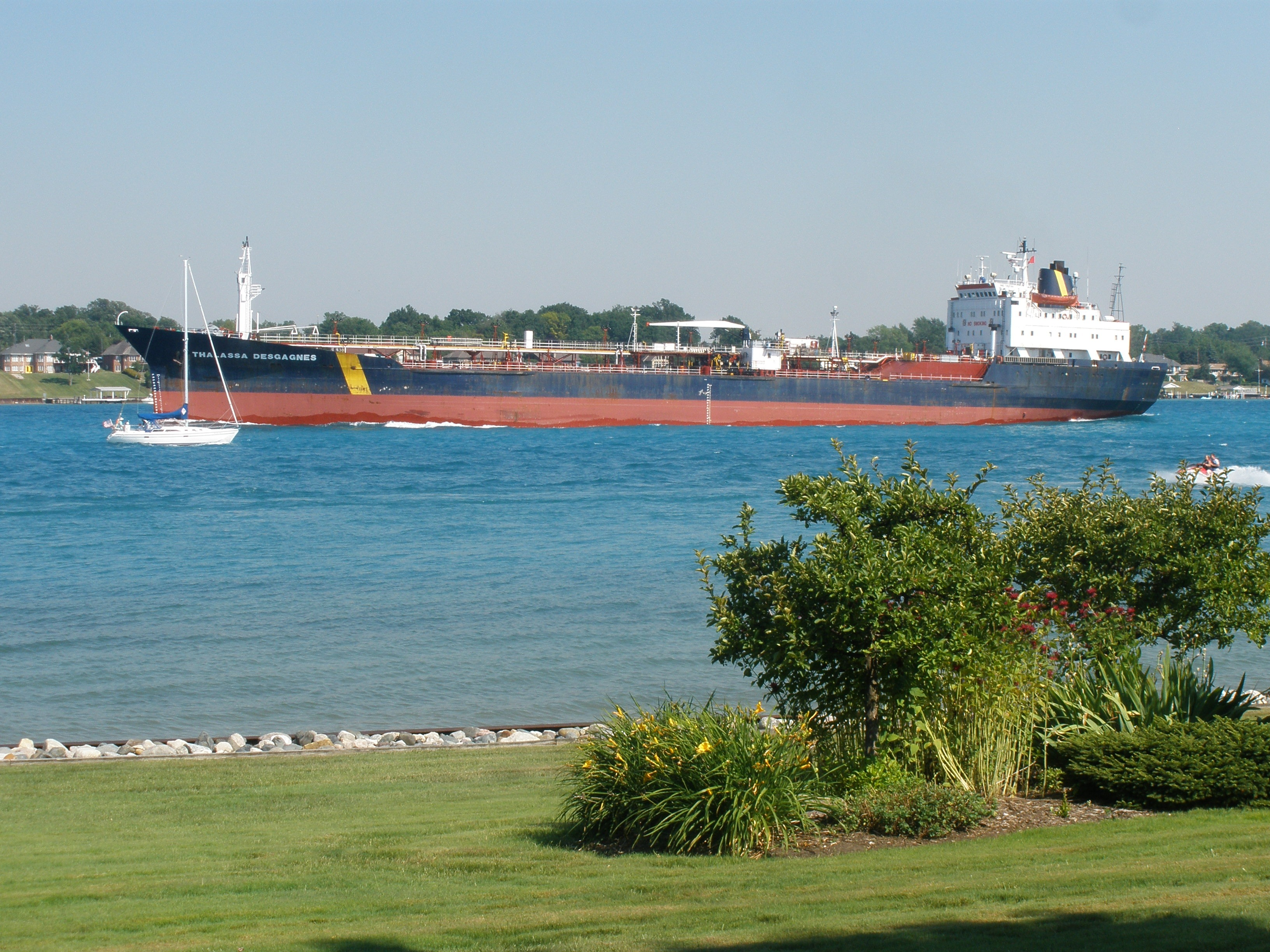
- Asphalt Princess in 2010 (whilst still called Thalassa Desgagnes)
- Date: 3 August 2021
- Location: ~61 NM East of Fujairah, Gulf of Oman, Indian Ocean; 24.595°N 57.286°E
- Target: Asphalt Princess
- Property damage: 1 merchant ship damaged
- Suspects: Iran (alleged by US, British and Israeli officials; denied by Iran)

On 3 August 2021 the asphalt tanker Asphalt Princess, travelling from Khor Fakkan, the United Arab Emirates, to the Sohar, Oman, was attacked and boarded in the Gulf of Oman. The ship is flagged in Panama. The vessel is owned by Glory International, listed as based in the Emirati free zone.

In early August 2021, the Asphalt Princess was widely reported in the western media as having been hijacked in the Gulf of Oman, 60 nautical miles (110 km; 69 mi) east the port of Fujairah in the United Arab Emirates. The hijackers were allegedly backed by Iran. Shipping near in the Gulf of Oman were advised to exercise “extreme caution” by the United Kingdom Maritime Trade Operations (UKMTO) earlier in the day.

The attack was preceded by three similar maritime incidents in May 2019, June 2019 and July 2021.

== Incident ==
On 3 August 2021, four oil tankers called Queen Ematha, Golden Brilliant, Jag Pooja, and Abyss, sailing in the Gulf of Oman, announced around the same time that they were “not under command."

At 14:18 UTC on 3 August 2021, watchkeepers at the United Kingdom Maritime Trade Operations (UKMTO) released a warning statement to international shipping that a "non-piracy" incident had taken place 60 nautical miles (110 km; 69 mi) east of the port of Fujairah in the United Arab Emirates (at 24.595°N 57.286°E) at 12:30 UTC.

At 04:44 UTC on 4 August, UKMTO released an update declaring the incident a “potential hijacking”, where a group of eight or nine armed individuals were believed to have boarded the vessel without authorisation and ordered the ship to sail to Iran.

At 05:32 UTC on 4 August, the UKMTO reported that the boarders had left the vessel and that the vessel was safe, signifying an end to the incident.

At 07:26 UTC on 4 August, Al Jazeera reported on Twitter that the Iranian Armed Forces claimed to be "providing assistance and security for merchant ships" and were ready to send “relief units” to the vessel.

== Reactions ==
Iran denied having any role in the incident. The Iranian Foreign Ministry said on August 3 that the recent maritime attacks in the Persian Gulf were "completely suspicious", while an armed forces spokesman dismissed reports of the incident as "psychological warfare".

Oman confirmed the hijacking of the Asphalt Princess in a statement on 4 August, and the Sultanate's Navy said it deployed several ships to the Gulf of Oman "to help secure international waters."

== See also ==
- July 2021 Gulf of Oman incident
- 2022 Iran–Greece naval incident
- Iranian seizure of the tanker Talara
