= 2004 Iranian seizure of Royal Navy personnel =

- Part of the spillover of the Iraq War
- Two British patrol boats just after their capture as shown by Iranian TV
Date	21–24 June 2004
Location	Shatt al-Arab (Iran–Iraq border)
Result	Iranian victory: Iran confiscates British vessels and weapons; British naval personnel released after being held for three days

Belligerents
United Kingdom; Iraq	Iran

Units involved
(United Kingdom) Royal Marines (United Kingdom) Royal Navy (Iraq) Iraqi Navy (training)	(Iran) Border Guard Command (Iran) Islamic Revolutionary Guard Corps Navy

Casualties and losses
Three naval patrol boats seized Eight sailors captured (later released)	None

On 21 June 2004, in the Shatt al-Arab (Arvand Rud in Persian) waterway, six Royal Marines and two Royal Navy sailors were captured by Iran. The British servicemen were seized while training Iraqi river patrol personnel after Iran said they had strayed to the Iranian side of the waterway. They were threatened with legal action initially but released three days later following diplomatic discussions between Jack Straw, then British Foreign Secretary, and Kamal Kharazi, then Iranian Minister of Foreign Affairs. The weapons and boats of the British personnel were confiscated and have not been returned.

They were released unharmed three days later, on 24 June, after the British and Iranian governments agreed there had been a misunderstanding. Their equipment was not returned and a rigid inflatable boat (RIB) was put on display in a museum in Tehran. During their detention, according to former detainee Marine Scott Fallon, they endured a mock execution in which they were marched into the desert and made to stand blindfolded in front of a ditch while their captors cocked their weapons. They also appeared blindfolded on Iranian TV, where they were forced to apologise for their "mistake". The Royal Navy boats were operating close to the northern coast of the Persian Gulf in the mouth of the Shatt al-Arab waterway which divides southern Iran and Iraq. The weather was bad causing negligible visibility which may have contributed to a potential crossing of the Iranian border by the Royal Navy. After the crew were returned and events analysed the British government affirmed its belief that the personnel were actually still in Iraqi waters, however they consigned the incident to a misunderstanding and requested the return of the equipment. In 2015, an FOIA request released a redacted report.

== See also ==
- 2007 Iranian seizure of Royal Navy personnel
- Iran–United Kingdom relations
