= June 2019 Gulf of Oman incident =

Attack on two oil tankers in the Gulf of Oman

- Part of the 2019–2021 Persian Gulf crisis
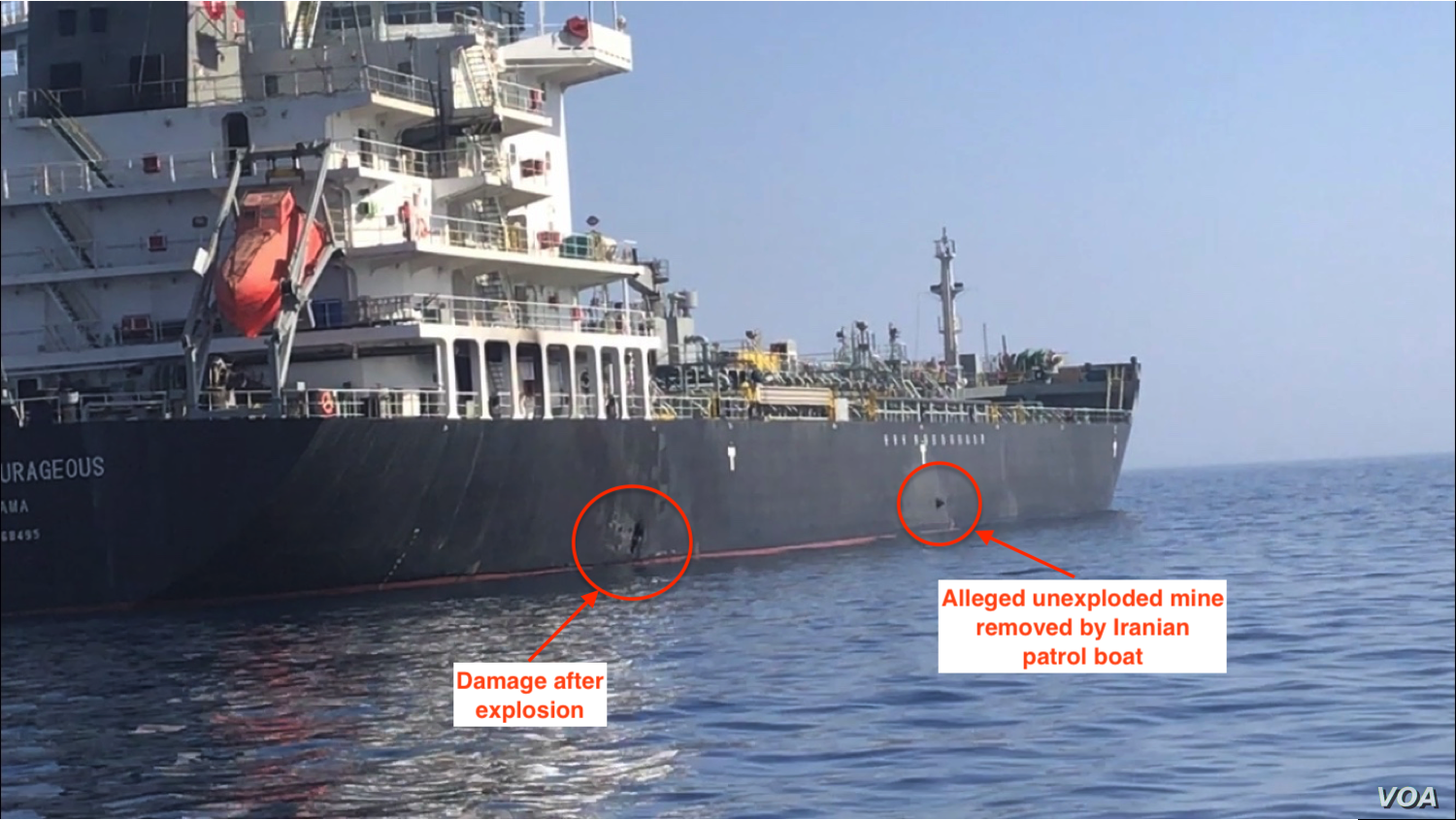
- Kokuka Courageous after the fire, with damage shown on the left and the alleged unexploded limpet mine still attached on the right
- Date: June 13, 2019
- Location: Gulf of Oman, Indian Ocean; 25.483°N 57.543°E
- Target: Merchant ships Kokuka Courageous (Note: Flagged in Panama and operated by a company based in Japan) and Front Altair (Note: Flagged in Marshall Islands and operated by a company based in Norway) 1 American drone aircraft
- Injuries: 1 crew member wounded
- Property damage: 2 merchant ships damaged
- Suspects: Iran (alleged by the United States, and supported by Saudi Arabia, Israel, and the United Kingdom; denied by Iran and owner of Japanese ship)

On 13 June 2019, two oil tankers were attacked near the Strait of Hormuz while they transited the Gulf of Oman. The Kokuka Courageous, flagged in Panama and operated by a company based in Japan, and Front Altair, flagged in Marshall Islands and operated by a company based in Norway, were attacked, allegedly with limpet mines or flying objects, sustaining fire damage. American and Iranian military personnel responded and rescued crew members. The attacks took place a month after the similar May 2019 Gulf of Oman incident and on the same day, Iranian Supreme Leader Iran Ali Khamenei met with Japanese Prime Minister Shinzō Abe in Iran. Abe was acting as an intermediary between US President Donald Trump and Khamenei.

Amid heightened tension between Iran and the United States, the United States blamed Iran for the attacks. Saudi Arabia and the United Kingdom supported the United States' accusation. Germany has stated that there is "strong evidence" that Iran was responsible for the attacks, and Japan has asked for more proof of Iran's culpability. Iran denied the accusation, blaming the United States for spreading disinformation and warmongering. In response to the incident, the United States announced on 17 June the deployment of 1,000 additional troops to the Middle East.

== Background ==
The incident occurred when tensions were high among Iran, the United States, and Saudi Arabia. On 8 May 2018, the United States withdrew from the Joint Comprehensive Plan of Action with Iran, reinstating sanctions against their nuclear program and starting a "maximum-pressure campaign" on Iran. In response, Iran threatened to close the Strait of Hormuz to international shipping, which could have a marked effect on the global oil market. The strait is a choke-point through which some 17.2 million barrels are transported each day, nearly 20 percent of global oil consumption. Iran's oil production has hit a historic low as a result of sanctions; yet Saudi Arabia maintained supplies, leaving prices reasonably stable. According to the BBC, U.S. sanctions against Iran "have led to a sharp downturn in Iran's economy, pushing the value of its currency to record lows, quadrupling its annual inflation rate, driving away foreign investors, and triggering protests." U.S. President Donald Trump offered to hold talks with Iran regarding their nuclear program and said he was willing to make a deal to remove sanctions and help fix their economy. However, he did not rule out the possibility of a military conflict with Iran. Iran stated that the United States must first return to the nuclear deal before starting any new negotiations.

During the Iran–Iraq War, Iraq started a "Tanker War" in the Persian Gulf in 1981. Iran started to fight back in 1984 when Iraq ramped up its attacks on Iranian tankers. In 1987 the U.S. launched Operation Earnest Will to protect Kuwaiti tankers against Iranian attacks. On 5 May 2019, National Security Advisor John R. Bolton announced that the U.S. was deploying the USS Abraham Lincoln carrier strike group and four B-52 bombers to the Middle East to "send a clear and unmistakable message" to Iran following intelligence reports of an Iranian plot to attack U.S. forces in the region. On 10 May 2019, The Pentagon announced the deployment of USS Arlington and a battery of Patriot missiles to join their military forces in the Gulf of Oman region.

The June 2019 Gulf of Oman incident occurred approximately one month after the May 2019 Gulf of Oman incident, after which an international investigation concluded that four oil tankers from Norway, Saudi Arabia, and the United Arab Emirates had been targeted through a sophisticated operation placing limpet mines perpetrated by a "state actor". U.S. intelligence blamed the attacks on Iran, which increased tensions.

The two oil tankers damaged in this incident were Front Altair, owned by a Norwegian company, and the Japan-based Kokuka Courageous. The tankers were carrying petroleum products from Saudi Arabia, Qatar, and the United Arab Emirates. Front Altair was carrying naphtha from Abu Dhabi National Oil Company (ADNOC), and was traveling from Ruwais in the United Arab Emirates to Kaohsiung, Taiwan under charter by CPC Corporation, the national petroleum company of the Taiwan government. Kokuka Courageous was carrying methanol from Jubail, Saudi Arabia and Mesaieed, Qatar, and was headed to Singapore.

The incident occurred during a two-day diplomatic visit by Japan's Prime Minister Shinzō Abe to Iran. Abe was carrying a note from Donald Trump to the Supreme Leader of Iran Ayatollah Ali Khamenei, who rejected exchanging messages with Trump, stating "I do not see Trump as worthy of any message exchange, and I do not have any reply for him, now or in future". According to the Japanese Ministry of Economy, Trade and Industry, the targeted ships were carrying "Japan-related" cargo.

== Incident ==
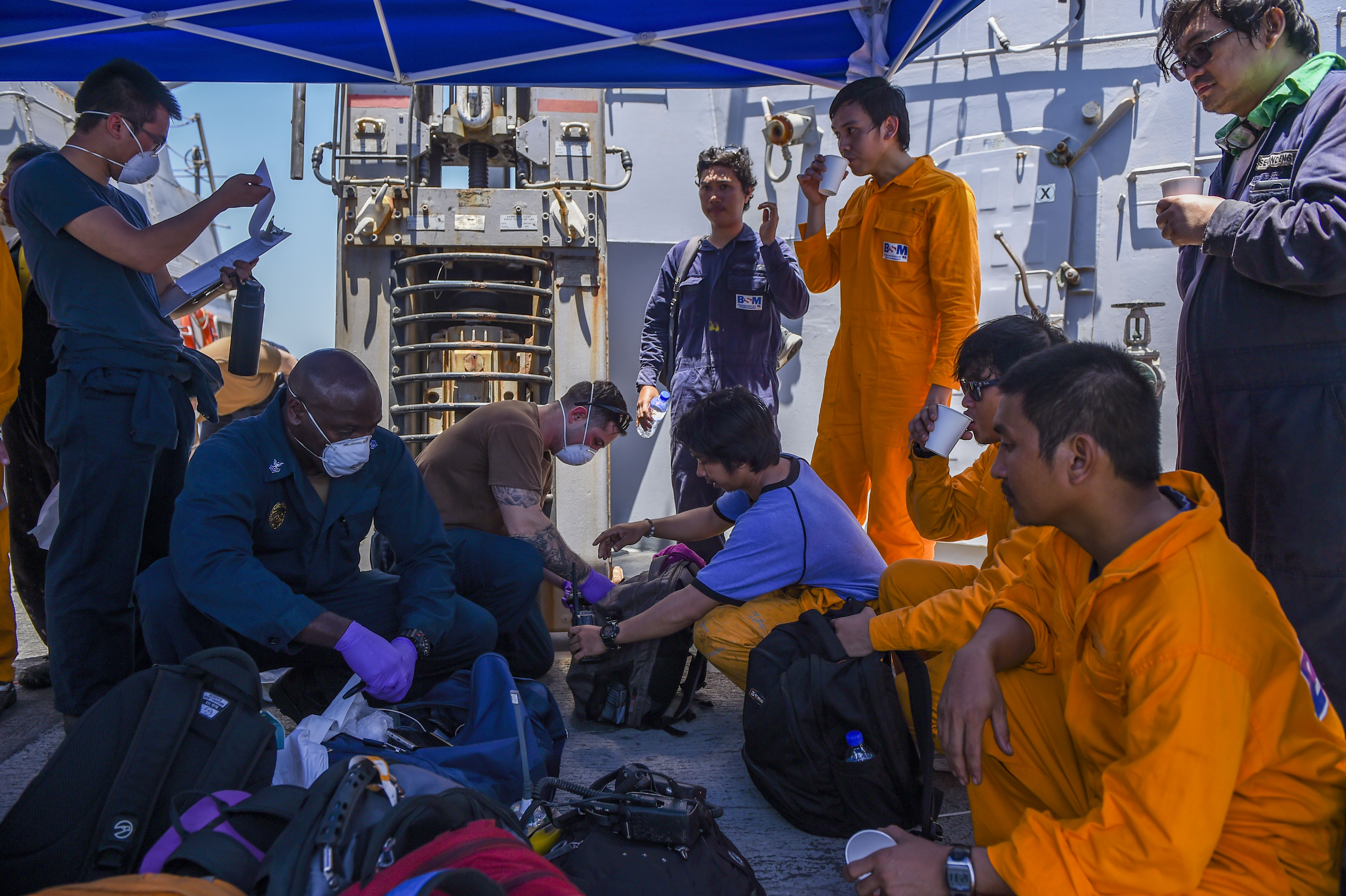
U.S. Navy sailors provide aid to the crew of Kokuka Courageous onboard USS Bainbridge

On 13 June 2019, Front Altair and Kokuka Courageous were both transiting the Gulf of Oman heading southeast in international waters. According to the U.S. Navy, a distress call from Front Altair was received at 03:12 GMT (06:12 local time) following an explosion. Eight minutes later, a U.S. MQ-9 Reaper drone arrived at the site of Front Altair, observing the ship on fire. According to a U.S. official, Iranian vessels were observed by the American drone to approach the two merchant ships. According to the U.S. military, at 03:45 GMT (06:45 local time), a modified SA-7 surface to air missile was fired at the American drone, missing its target by approximately 1 km (0.62 mi). Subsequent to the incident with the drone, an explosion occurred on Kokuka Courageous. According to the U.S. Navy, a distress call from Kokuka Courageous was received at 04:00 GMT (07:00 local time). CPC Corporation, which was contracting Front Altair, reported that it may have been hit by a torpedo at around 04:00 GMT on 13 June. The hull of Kokuka Courageous was reportedly breached above the waterline on the starboard side.

Both ships caught fire, but Frontline and Kokuka Sangyo (affiliated to Mitsubishi Gas Chemical Company), the respective owners of the two vessels, reported that all crew members from both ships had successfully evacuated. Iranian News Agency (IRNA) initially reported that Front Altair had sunk, but the statement was later denied by a Frontline spokesman. Other reports suggested that the attacks may have involved limpet mines. Iran reported that they had rescued all 44 crew members of both vessels and taken them to Iran. However, the U.S. Navy responded to assist both vessels after the attack and reported having rescued some of the crew. U.S. officials said that the guided missile destroyer USS Bainbridge rescued 21 crew members from a tugboat that had rescued them from the burning Kokuka Courageous tanker.

A Dutch vessel en route to Dubai rescued 21 people, mostly Filipinos, from Kokuka Courageous. This was confirmed by the Dutch shipping company Acta Marine. The 23 crew of Front Altair were first rescued by a nearby South Korean vessel, Hyundai Dubai. The South Korean Hyundai Merchant Marine Company confirmed the rescue and said the vessel later handed over the rescued crew members to an Iranian rescue boat. According to US intelligence reports, shortly after the crews were evacuated, Iranian military boats surrounded the rescue ships and told them to hand over the mariners into their custody. One of the civilian rescue ships eventually complied with this request. The crew of 23 people of the Frontline's Front Altair was transferred to an Iranian navy vessel and disembarked at a local Iranian port, later being transferred to Bandar Abbas. Neither oil tanker was sunk in the attack, despite significant damage. The U.S. Navy later sent another destroyer, USS Mason, to the location of the incident.

== Aftermath ==
After the incident, Kokuka Courageous was towed to the port of Kalba in the United Arab Emirates. Dutch firm Boskalis was appointed to salvage both Kokuka Courageous and Front Altair.

On 15 June, the crew of Front Altair arrived in Dubai, United Arab Emirates, on an Iran Air flight from Bandar Abbas, Iran. Robert Hvide Macleod, CEO of Frontline Management said "Everyone has been very well cared for in Iran, and everyone is in good shape".

Kokuka Courageous's 21 crew members were returned to the vessel by the U.S. Navy's Fifth Fleet after being rescued.

Front Altair was towed to the port of Khorfakkan in the United Arab Emirates. Both Kokuka Courageous and Front Altair will have their cargoes unloaded and will be assessed for damages by a specialist team.

On 20 June 2019, Iran shot down an American surveillance drone in the Gulf of Oman.

Conspiracy theories have been spread regarding the incident.

== Investigation ==
Footage released by the U.S. Central Command allegedly showing an IRGC patrol boat removing an unexploded limpet mine from Kokuka Courageous

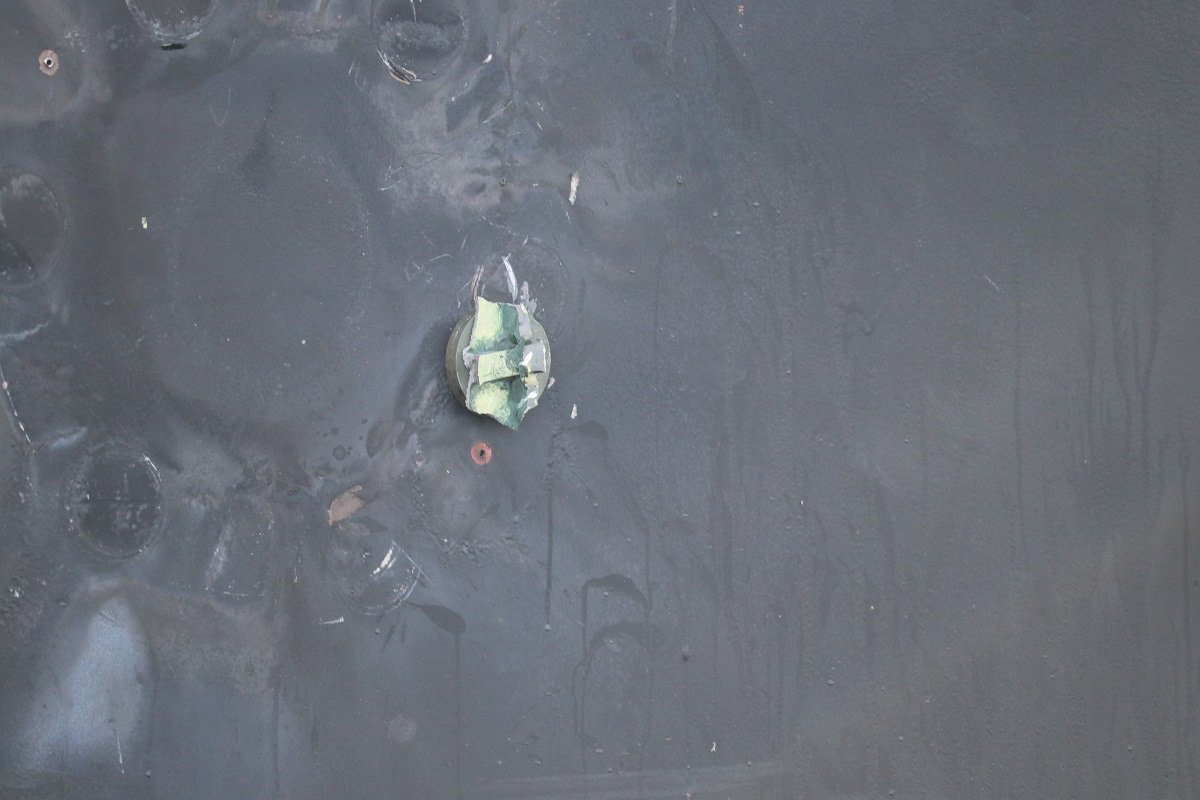
Magnet attached to the side of Kokuka Courageous, allegedly left over from the removed limpet mine

U.S. Secretary of State Mike Pompeo said on the day of the incident that Iran was responsible for the attack. He based this assessment on "intelligence, the weapons used, the expertise needed" and "recent similar Iranian attacks on shipping". The New York Times reported that experts believe that Iran would carry out such an attack to hit back at the United States while maintaining enough ambiguity to avoid a direct counterattack. The Iranian government, in response, denied any and all responsibility and criticized the accusation. Acting U.S. Secretary of Defense Patrick Shanahan remarked that the U.S. wanted to "build international consensus to this international problem", partly by declassifying and releasing intelligence.

On 13 June, the U.S. military released a video which it said shows members of the Iranian Revolutionary Guard removing an unexploded mine from the side of Kokuka Courageous at 4.10pm local time. The patrol boat shown in the video matched the model and dimensions of patrol boats used by the Navy of the Islamic Revolutionary Guard Corps, with an identical chevron pattern, center console, and anti-aircraft gun. Iran called the U.S. accusations that it attacked the ships baseless.

On 14 June, the head of the company that owns Kokuka Courageous, Yutaka Katada, stated that the crew members "are saying that they were hit by a flying object. They saw it with their own eyes." Then, "some crew witnessed a second shot". He said he believed the incident could not have been a torpedo attack, because the ship was hit above the waterline, and that he was more likely to believe a penetrating bullet hit it than a mine. He clarified this was "just an assumption or a guess."

Also on 14 June, the Tasnim News Agency reported that Hormozgan Province's port director stated that early investigations indicated that the fires broke out due to technical reasons and that there is no proof that an external object hit either ship.

Iran's United Nations mission issued a statement wherein it called on the United States and its regional allies to "put an end to mischievous plots and false flag operations in the region." Analyst François Heisbourg stated "There's a lot of suspicion in Europe about American motives. The maritime milieu is especially susceptible to manipulation – remember the Gulf of Tonkin." Analyst Anthony Cordesman raised "the possibility that ISIS (Daesh) carried out the attack as trigger to turn two enemies – the United States and Iran – against each other. Or you're watching Saudi Arabia and the United Arab Emirates create an incident that they could then use to increase the pressure on Iran."

On 17 June, the Pentagon released new images which, according to it, were taken from an MH-60R Navy surveillance helicopter of the aftermath of alleged Iranian attack on tankers in the Gulf of Oman. They again allegedly showed IRGC members removing an unexploded limpet mine.

== Reactions ==
=== Political ===
==== Iran ====
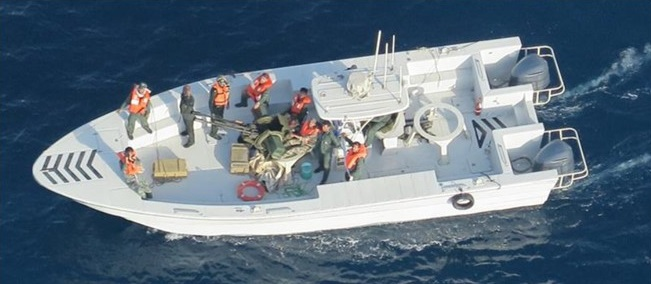
The patrol boat filmed allegedly removing a limpet mine (pictured) matches the model and dimensions of patrol boats used by the IRGC Navy, with its distinctive chevron pattern and center console.

After news of the incident, the Iranian Foreign Minister Mohammad Javad Zarif tweeted "Suspicious doesn't begin to describe what likely transpired this morning." He described the attacks as a move by "the B-team" (Note: Term coined by Iranian Foreign Minister Mohammad Javad Zarif to refer to John R. Bolton, Mohammad bin Salman, Mohammed bin Zayed Al Nahyan and Benjamin Netanyahu) to sabotage diplomacy. Iran's mission to the United Nations issued a statement wherein it called on the United States and its regional allies to "put an end to mischievous plots and false flag operations in the region." Iranian parliament speaker Ali Larijani said that the United States may have carried out false flag operations against the oil tankers.

On 18 June, Iranian president Hassan Rouhani said on live television that "Iran will not wage war against any nation. Those facing us are a group of politicians with little experience."

Iran's mission to the United Nations responded to the U.S. accusation by saying that the Iranian government "categorically rejects" the U.S. claim that it was responsible for the attacks and condemned it "in the strongest possible terms".

==== United States ====
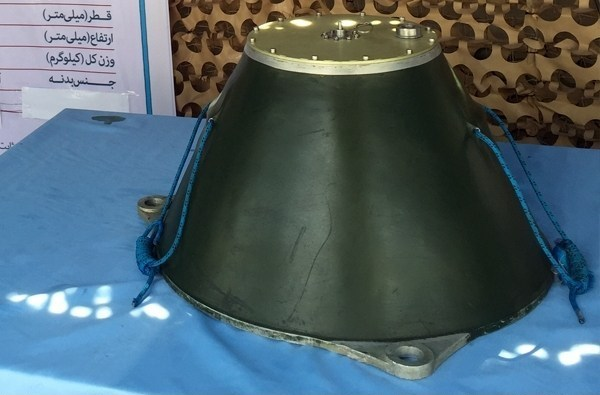
The United States identified this particular type of limpet mine, called "Iranian Indigenous Extra-Large Limpet Mine," as being used in the attack.

U.S. officials have blamed the attacks on Iran, with United States Secretary of State Mike Pompeo stating that the U.S. "would defend its forces and interests in the region". Saudi Arabia's Minister of State for Foreign Affairs Adel Al-Jubeir agreed with Pompeo, saying "Iran has a history of doing this." During an interview with Fox News, Trump further asserted the blame on Iran, calling the country "a nation of terror".

Senator and presidential candidate Bernie Sanders called for the incident to be "fully investigated" while adding that a war with Iran "would be an unmitigated disaster for the United States, Iran, the region and the world.” Fellow senator and presidential candidate Elizabeth Warren echoed Sanders saying she was “very concerned about a slide towards war with Iran”.

On 17 June, Maariv reported that diplomatic sources at the United Nations Headquarters revealed to the newspaper an American plan to carry out a tactical assault against Iran – namely, aerial bombardment of an Iranian facility related to its nuclear program. That evening, the U.S. Department of Defense announced the deployment of 1,000 additional troops to the Middle East as a defensive response to the incident.

==== United Kingdom ====
The United Kingdom Foreign and Commonwealth Office stated that they share the U.S. government's assessment that Iran is to blame for two attacks on oil tankers in the Gulf of Oman, with British Foreign Secretary Jeremy Hunt calling Iran's alleged actions "deeply unwise".

The office released another statement that "It is almost certain that a branch of the Iranian military – the Islamic Revolutionary Guard Corps – attacked the two tankers on 13 June. No other state or non-state actor could plausibly have been responsible." Hunt said "our starting point is obviously to believe our U.S. allies" and the UK "will be making our own assessment soberly and carefully". He accused Iran of orchestrating the May 2019 Gulf of Oman incident, stating "The Emirati-led investigation of the 12 May attack on four oil tankers near the port of Fujairah concluded that it was conducted by a sophisticated state actor. We are confident that Iran bears responsibility for that attack."

The position on the June incident was challenged on Twitter by opposition leader Jeremy Corbyn, who questioned the existence of "credible evidence" and cautioned against fueling a war with rhetoric, an objection Hunt called "pathetic and predictable", before rhetorically questioning Corbyn's patriotism.

==== Other countries ====
Crown Prince of Saudi Arabia Mohammad Bin Salman Al Saud blamed Iran for the attacks. Saudi Arabian Energy Minister Khalid al-Falih urged a "swift and decisive response" to the incident. Saudi Minister of Foreign Affairs Adel al-Jubeir expressed support for the U.S. position, saying that "Iran has a history of doing this".

Israeli Prime Minister Benjamin Netanyahu said that "the world needs to back the US" in the incident.

The German government urged "a spiral of escalation must be avoided". Responding to the video released by the US Central Command, German Foreign Minister Heiko Maas remarked that "to make a final assessment, this is not enough for me". Later, Chancellor Angela Merkel stated there was "strong evidence" that Iran was behind the attacks, adding "we must do everything to solve the conflict with Iran in a peaceful way".

The Italian Foreign Minister Enzo Moavero said: "We do think that there is room for finding a way for peace and stability in the world". Meanwhile, Jean Asselborn, Luxembourg's Foreign Minister, said: "I believe that the main task of foreign ministers is to avoid war... you really shouldn't make the mistake of believing that you can solve a problem in the Middle East with weapons". Pekka Haavisto, his Finnish counterpart stated there should be "a proper investigation [to put] all the facts on the table and then we can look what really has happened, who is behind this".

General Secretary of the Communist Party and Chinese President Xi Jinping told his Iranian counterpart Hassan Rouhani during an SCO meeting that China would promote ties with Iran regardless of developments from the incident. State councillor and Chinese foreign minister Wang Yi asked for all parties involved to "not open a Pandora's box". Russian Deputy Foreign Minister Sergei Ryabkov warned "against hasty conclusions, against attempts to lay the blame at the door of those we don't like".

On 14 June 2019 Norwegian Foreign Minister Ine Marie Eriksen Søreide while expressing concern said "On the Norwegian side, we await the final results of the investigation" and "We encourage all actors to show restraint and avoid actions that contribute to further escalation" The Norwegian Ministry of Foreign Affairs believes the attacks increase the tension in the area. The Norwegian Maritime Directorate has gone out to warn five Norwegian ships that are in the Gulf of Oman.

On 15 June 2019, Prime Minister of Japan Shinzō Abe "resolutely denounced" the attacks on both ships, though he did not point to any one country. His statement came following a telephone call with U.S. President Donald Trump. After reviewing the video evidence, a source close to Abe said "These are not definite proof that it's Iran" behind the attacks, and "even if it's the United States that makes the assertion, we cannot simply say we believe it".

==== Other organizations ====
The United Nations Security Council met on 13 June in a closed door meeting with a briefing by US acting Ambassador regarding Washington's assessment that Iran was responsible for the suspected attack on two tankers in the strategic sea lane.

Paulo d'Amico, the chairman of the International Association of Independent Tanker Owners, expressed concerns for the safety of other vessels in the region and their crews. As a result of the incident, shipping through the Strait has slowed, due to concerns of further damage.

The Arab League Secretary-General Ahmed Aboul Gheit called on the United Nations Security Council to take action against those responsible and maintain maritime security. After meeting with UN Secretary-General António Guterres at UN headquarters in New York on 14 June, Aboul Gheit also stated “We believe that responsibilities need to be clearly defined... The facts will be revealed, I am sure, it’s only a matter of time.” Amid U.S. accusations of Iran's involvement in the attack, Abuol Gheit said "My call to my Iranian – and I call them Iranian brothers: Be careful and reverse course because you’re pushing everybody towards a confrontation that no one would be safe if it happens."

=== Economic ===
Following a month-long decrease, the price of oil initially increased by 4% after the incident, then settled to an increase of 2%. The increase in oil prices has been attributed to uncertainty regarding the supply of oil, due to reduced shipping in the Strait of Hormuz as a result of this incident. On 17 June, the price of oil returned to its previous decreasing trend, falling by 1.7%.

The price of insurance for cargo ships has also risen in response to the event, which could increase oil prices. Bloomberg reported that the war risk insurance premium for the Persian Gulf – which had already increased following the May incidents – jumped from US$50,000 to US$185,000 for supertankers.

== See also ==
- Iran–Saudi Arabia proxy conflict
- List of shipwrecks in 2019
- July 2021 Gulf of Oman incident
- August 2021 Gulf of Oman incident
- Iranian seizure of the tanker Talara
