= May 2019 Gulf of Oman incident =

Sabotage of 4 commercial ships in the Gulf of Oman

- Part of 2019–2021 Persian Gulf crisis and the Second Cold War
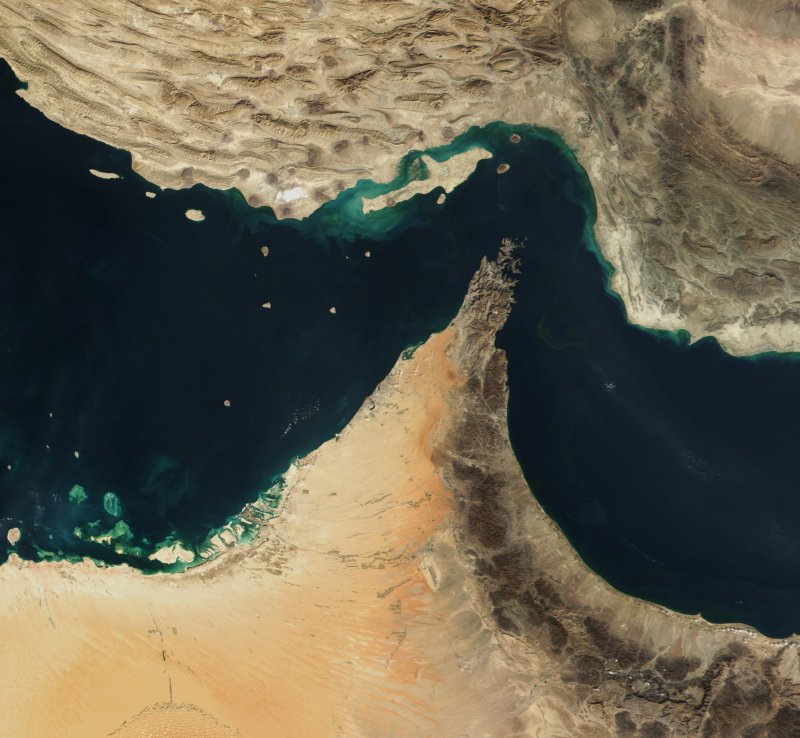
- Satellite image of the strategic Strait of Hormuz
- Date: May 12, 2019
- Location: Gulf of Oman; 25°10′18″N 56°22′38″E
- Type: Limpet mine attack
- Target: Merchant ships flagged in: Norway; Saudi Arabia; United Arab Emirates
- Property damage: 4 merchant ships damaged
- Suspects: Iran (alleged by the United States, and supported by Saudi Arabia, Israel, and the United Kingdom; denied by Iran)

On 12 May 2019, four commercial ships were damaged off Fujairah's coast in the Gulf of Oman. The ships included two Saudi Arabian registered oil tankers, a Norwegian registered oil tanker, and an Emirati registered bunkering ship. The ships were anchored on the United Arab Emirates territorial waters for bunkering in Port of Fujairah. The Ministry of Foreign Affairs of the United Arab Emirates reported that the ships had been subject to a "sabotage attack". The United Arab Emirates launched a joint investigation probe with United States and France. The initial investigation assessment determined that 5-to-10-foot (1.5 to 3.0 m) holes near or below all the ships' waterlines were probably caused by explosive charges.

The incident occurred amid increasing tension between the United States and Iran in the Persian Gulf region, leading U.S. officials to suspect Iran of being behind the attack. The United Arab Emirates government did not accuse any perpetrators, stating that the report of the investigation probe must first be finalized. The government of Iran called for an international investigation of the incident, describing it as a possible false flag operation. The United States accused Iran's Islamic Revolutionary Guard Corps (IRGC) of being "directly responsible" for the attacks. The findings of an Emirati-led international investigation into the attacks has stated that a sophisticated and coordinated operation by divers from fast boats utilized limpet mines to breach the hull of the ships, concluding that a "state actor" is the most likely culprit. A similar incident took place a month later on 13 June 2019.

== Background ==
The incident occurred in a time when tensions between Iran, the United States, and Saudi Arabia were high. On 8 May 2018, the United States withdrew from the Joint Comprehensive Plan of Action with Iran, reinstating Iran sanctions against their nuclear program. In response, Iran threatened to close off the Strait of Hormuz to international shipping that will cause a consequential effect on global oil market. The strait is a choke point which carries a significant amount of oil exports to the world market demand. As a result of renewed sanctions on Iran, Iran's oil production has hit historic low as Saudi Arabia kept supplies maintained, keeping markets unaffected. Donald Trump has offered to have talks with Iran regarding their nuclear program, offering to make them a deal which will remove sanctions and help fix their economy. He has however not ruled out the possibility of a military conflict with Iran. Iran responded to Trump by stating that there will be no negotiations with the United States.

On 5 May, U.S. National security adviser John Bolton announced that the U.S. was deploying the USS Abraham Lincoln Carrier Strike Group and four B-52 bombers to the Middle East to "send a clear and unmistakable message" to Iran following intelligence reports of an alleged Iranian plot to attack U.S. forces in the region. Israeli intelligence also warned the United States in days prior to the incident of what it said was Iran's intention to strike Saudi vessels.

In the days before the incident, the United States had warned that Iran or its proxies could target marine traffic in the region and deployed naval forces to counter what it called "clear indications" of a threat.

=== Motive ===
According to US Secretary of State Mike Pompeo, the incident was orchestrated by Iran to try and raise the price of oil as Washington works to end Iran's exports of crude. Iran has denied the accusation, instead calling for an international investigation and warned of a possible false flag operation. According to Iran, the attack was an "Israeli mischief" to attempt and cause a military reaction. The United States, Iran, and Saudi Arabia have all voiced their opposition to military conflict in the region. The maritime incident was followed two days later by an attack on Saudi oil pipelines to Yanbu by Houthis. Both routes were used by Saudi Arabia and the United Arab Emirates to export oil without passing through the Strait of Hormuz circumventing previous Iranian threats to close the strait. Both incidents led observers to speculate that the Iranian Revolutionary Guard Corps orchestrated both attacks to send a message of willingness to inflict economic harm on the Gulf Cooperation Council states and the ability to influence oil trade outside the Strait of Hormuz.

== Incident ==
On 12 May 2019, morning local time, a pro-Hezbollah news channel Al Mayadeen falsely reported that seven oil tankers were involved in an explosion in the Port of Fujairah. The news report was quickly picked up by Iranian-based Press TV and other news outlets. The United Arab Emirates denied any explosions on the port and stated that the port continues to operate normally. The UAE Ministry of Foreign Affairs and International Cooperation later released a statement that four ships off the port of Fujairah outside the UAE territorial waters were targeted in a "sabotage attack".

One ship was flying the UAE flag and another was flying the Norwegian flag while two Saudi oil tankers were also among the targeted ships. No casualties were reported and no oil or chemical spills occurred. Saudi Arabian Minister of Energy, Industry and Mineral Resources and chairman of Saudi Aramco, Khalid al-Falih, stated that two of the damaged ships were Saudi owned oil tankers. "One of the two vessels was on its way to be loaded with Saudi crude oil from the port of Ras Tanura, to be delivered to Saudi Aramco's customers in the United States", he added. The vessels were later identified as the Saudi-flagged Almarzoqah and Amjad, the UAE-flagged A. Michel and the Norway-flagged Andrea Victory.

Thome Ship Management, the firm who manages the Norwegian ship, reported that their ship had been "struck by an unknown object on the waterline" while anchored off Fujairah.

== Investigation ==
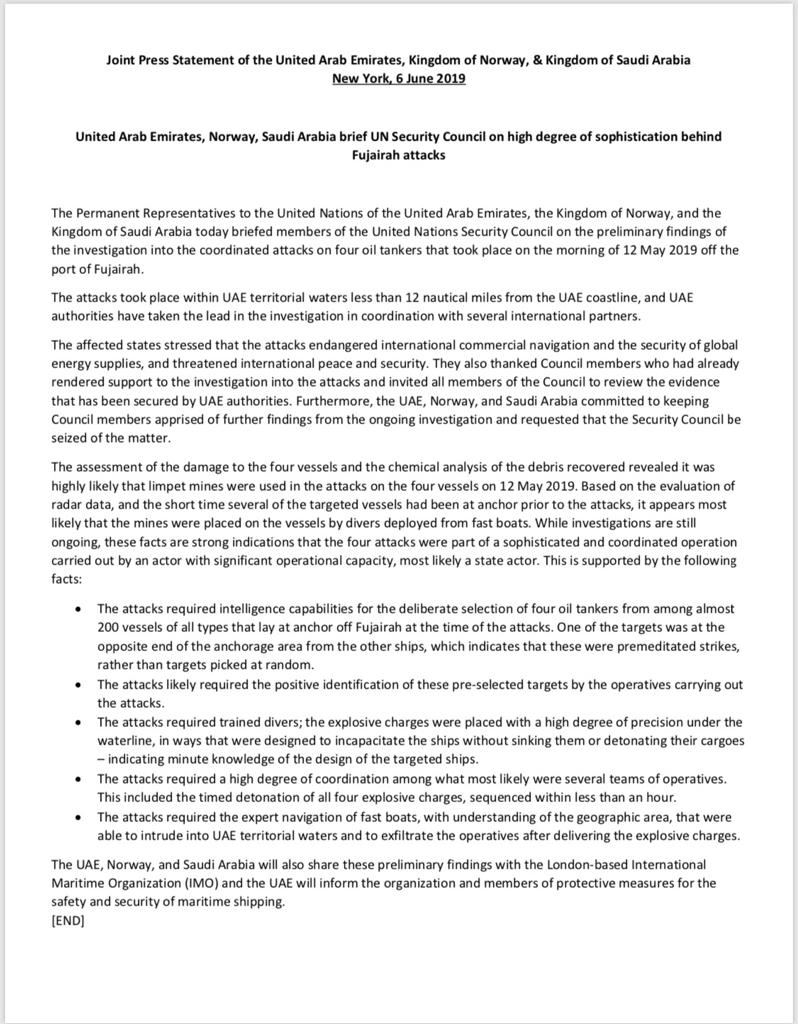
Joint press statement by Norway, Saudi Arabia, and the United Arab Emirates to the United Nations Security Council on 6 June 2019 regarding the findings of the investigation.

The UAE requested assistance from the US in launching an investigation probe to determine the cause of the damage. The assessment determined that 5-to-10-foot (1.5 to 3.0 m) holes near or below all the ships water line were likely caused by explosive charges. The US military team that assessed the blasts initial investigation blamed Iran or Iranian-backed proxies of causing the attack. The US issued new warnings to commercial ship of acts of sabotage targeting ships in the Middle East.

The UAE reiterated that the incident would be investigated "in cooperation with local and international bodies". The incident occurred at a time when tensions between the U.S. and Iran had increased in the Middle East. The Pentagon dispatched an aircraft carrier, a Patriot missile battery and a squadron of B-52 bombers to the region. France, Norway, and Saudi Arabia also joined in investigating the cause of the damage. The UAE stated that the joint probe into tanker attack will ensure impartiality.

The Norwegian insurer report on the incident concluded that Iran's Islamic Revolutionary Guard Corps (IRGC) are “highly likely” to have facilitated the attacks.

The United States Admiral Michael Gilday, the director of the Joint Staff, has announced that the United States intelligence has concluded that Iran's revolutionary Guard Corps to be "directly responsible" for the attacks. Gilday stated "We believe with a high degree of confidence that this stems back to the leadership of Iran at the highest levels and that all of the attacks that I mentioned have been attributed to Iran through their proxies or their forces."

An international investigation probe, led by the United Arab Emirates, was conducted on the incident. The initial findings of the international investigation submitted to the United Nations Security Council (UNSC) by the UAE permanent mission to the United Nations in a joint statement with Saudi Arabia and Norway on 6 June 2019 stated "strong indications that the four attacks were part of a sophisticated and coordinated operation carried out with significant operational capacity." According to the investigation, the attacks were carried out by several teams of operatives with a high level of precision. The investigation assessed the damage to the four vessels and conducted a chemical analysis of the debris, concluding it was "highly likely" that limpet mines were used in the attack. According to the statement, “It appears most likely that the mines were placed on the vessels by divers deployed from fast boats.” Analysis was made based on available radar data and the short time the vessels were at anchor before the attack. The investigation determined that the mines were designed to damage the ships without sinking them or detonating their cargoes. According to the statement submitted to the UN Security Council, “The four attacks were part of a sophisticated and co-ordinated operation carried out by an actor with significant operational capacity, most likely a state actor.” The statement did not name any suspected perpetrator.

== Aftermath ==
=== Economic effects ===
After this incident, the price of oil rose more than $1 per barrel. Saudi Energy Minister Khalid al-Falih said one Saudi oil tanker was on its way to Aramco's customers in the United States, and that the explosions did serious damage to the vessels’ structures. Also, Dubai and Abu Dhabi stock markets saw their biggest drops in 2019, with Dubai falling 4% and the Saudi markets falling 3.6%.

As a result of the incident the United States Maritime Administration (MARAD) issued an alert to all ships off the coast of the United Arab Emirates due to "acts of sabotage" and suggested caution be exercised for "at least the next week".

=== Increase in Iranian-American tensions ===
On 15 May 2019, the United States Department of State ordered all non-emergency, non-essential government employees at the U.S. Embassy in Baghdad and the Erbil consulate offices to leave Iraq amid heightened tensions in the Persian Gulf between the United States and Iran. Germany and the Netherlands suspended military training missions in Iraq, also citing escalating tensions in the region with Iran.

== Reactions ==
The Secretary-General of the Arab League Ahmed Aboul Gheit said in a statement that these acts are a "serious violation of the freedom and integrity of trade and maritime transport routes" and that the Arab League stands by the UAE and Saudi Arabia "in all measures taken to safeguard their security and interests".

Norway, Saudi Arabia, and the United Arab Emirates wrote a joint letter to the UNSC notifying them of the targeting of commercial ships in the Middle East. On 6 June 2019, a joint statement submitted by the UAE, alongside Saudi Arabia and Norway, to the UNSC relayed the findings of the international investigation which concluded that a "state actor" is "highly likely" the culprit of the attack, but did not name a suspected perpetrator. Iran's Foreign Minister Mohammad Javad Zarif condemned the June 6 meeting between the United Nations Security Council and Saudi Arabia, Norway and the UAE. In a tweet, he accused the Mossad of "fabricating intelligence about Iran's involvement in sabotage".

The United Arab Emirates Minister of State for Foreign Affairs Anwar Gargash stated that the UAE is "committed to de-escalation" after increased tensions in the Gulf. Gargash stated "We are not going to jump the gun.. We need to emphasise caution without throwing accusations. We have always called for restraint and we will always call for that." However, he blamed "Iranian behaviour" for the recent increase in tensions in the Gulf region. The United Arab Emirates government did not name any perpetrators. UAE Foreign Minister Abdullah bin Zayed Al Nahyan stated that evidence from the investigation has shown that the tanker attacks were "state-sponsored" and that the evidence has been presented to the UN Security Council.

The United States president Donald Trump threatened Iran with a "bad problem" following the news of the sabotage attack. When he was asked to clarify what he meant by a "bad problem," Trump responded: “You can figure it out yourself. They know what I mean by it.” John R. Bolton, the United States national security adviser, also accused Iran of playing a key role in recent attacks on ships off the coast of the United Arab Emirates, calling Iran "almost certainly" responsible for the attacks, telling journalists at a briefing in the United States Embassy in Abu Dhabi, "who else would you think would be doing it? Someone from Nepal?". Iran quickly dismissed the accusations, with a Foreign Ministry spokesman describing them as "ridiculous" and calling Bolton a "warmonger".

Iran called the idea that it would target marine traffic "nonsense" and called for a full investigation into the incident. Iran through its parliamentary spokesman called the attacks on the tankers "Israeli mischief". While Iran did not expand on the statement, Iran stated that it was the conclusion reached by the Iranian government.

Saudi Arabia, who also had an oil pipeline attacked by Iranian backed Houthi rebels in Yemen around the same time, called for an emergency meeting of the Gulf Cooperation Council (GCC) and leaders of the Arab League to discuss the security of the region and the recent "aggressions and their consequences". Saudi minister of state Adel al-Jubeir stated that Saudi Arabia is doing its best to avoid war in the region but stands ready to defend itself from any threats. Saudi Arabia accused Iran of seeking to destabilize the region and urged the international community to take responsibility to stop Iran from doing so. The Gulf Cooperation Council and Arab League nations met for three summits in Mecca, which concluded on calling for Iran to stop "interfering in the internal affairs" of its neighbors and denounced Tehran's "threat to maritime security". Iran criticized the allegations as "baseless" and accused Saudi Arabia of promoting an "American and Zionist" agenda. After the joint statement of Norway, Saudi Arabia, and the UAE to the United Nations Security Council, Saudi ambassador to the UN Abdallah Al-Mouallimi, blamed Iran, saying "We believe that the responsibility for this action lies on the shoulders of Iran [and] we have no hesitation in making this statement."

The United Kingdom Foreign and Commonwealth Office released a statement accusing Iran of orchestrating the incident, stating "The Emirati-led investigation of the 12 May attack on four oil tankers near the port of Fujairah concluded that it was conducted by a sophisticated state actor. We are confident that Iran bears responsibility for that attack". The Foreign and Commonwealth Office also released a statement on its own assessment of the June 2019 Gulf of Oman incident which occurred after a month, concluding “It is almost certain that a branch of the Iranian military - the Islamic Revolutionary Guard Corps - attacked the two tankers on 13 June. No other state or non-state actor could plausibly have been responsible".

== See also ==
- 2002 Strait of Gibraltar terror plot
- June 2019 Gulf of Oman incident
- July 2021 Gulf of Oman incident
- August 2021 Gulf of Oman incident
