= List of shipwrecks in 2019 =

The list of shipwrecks in 2019 includes ships sunk, foundered, grounded, or otherwise lost during 2019.

table of contents
2019
Jan	Feb	Mar	Apr
May	Jun	Jul	Aug
Sep	Oct	Nov	Dec

== January ==
=== 2 January ===
List of shipwrecks: 2 January 2019
Ship	State	Description
London	Palau	The cargo ship capsized 80 nautical miles (150 km) northeast of Pengjia Islet, north east of Taiwan. Five crew were rescued, ten were reported missing.
Ou Ya Leng 6	China	The fish carrier ran aground on Taka Atoll in the Marshall Islands and was abandoned. All 24 crew reached shore.

=== 3 January ===
List of shipwrecks: 3 January 2019
Ship	State	Description
Kalebi	Indonesia	The 53.49-metre (175 ft 6 in) ro-ro ferry ran aground in Gili Lebur, east of Lombok Island, while exiting port. All passengers were safely evacuated.

=== 6 January ===
List of shipwrecks: 6 January 2019
Ship	State	Description
Cavalier XV	Paraguay	The tug sank in the Paraná River in San Cosme y Damián after being struck by large swells and beginning to experience water ingress.
Jie Hai 189	China	The coaster sank after a collision in Hangzhou Bay south of Ningbo. One crew rescued, four missing.

=== 7 January ===
List of shipwrecks: 7 January 2019
Ship	State	Description
Forever Lucky	Philippines	The Project 302M/302K cruise ship ran aground in the Sulu Sea 15 nautical miles (28 km) northeast of Cagayancillo Island off Palawan, Philippines. The ship was still aground as of 12 January.
NB-8836	Vietnam	The inland cargo ship sank after a collision with Daio Southern Cross (Panama) in Ha Long Bay off Ha Long, Vietnam. Four crew were rescued and four were killed.
Tom Bussler	United States	The towboat capsized and sank on the Tennessee River near Calvert City, Kentucky. The two crew on board were rescued by fellow towboat George Leavell (United States).
Volgo-Balt 214	Panama	Carrying coal from Azov, Russia to Samsun, Turkey, the 1978-built, 113.87-metre (373 ft 7 in) general cargo ship sank in rough seas off the Turkish coast in the morning hours of 7 January 2019. Six crew members died while seven survivors were airlifted to hospital by a helicopter of the Turkish Coast Guard.

=== 8 January ===
List of shipwrecks: 8 January 2019
Ship	State	Description
Mary B II	United States	The crab boat capsized crossing the Yaquina Bay, Newport, Oregon bar. Three crew were killed.

=== 11 January ===
List of shipwrecks: 11 January 2019
Ship	State	Description
KMP Sangke Palangga	Indonesia	The ferry ran aground on a reef in the Flores Sea 5 nautical miles (9.3 km) off Maropokot, possibly capsizing and sinking. All crew and passengers were evacuated safely.

=== 13 January ===
List of shipwrecks: 13 January 2019
Ship	State	Description
Star Centurion	Vanuatu	The pipelayer capsized and sank after a collision with Antea (Hong Kong) 10 nautical miles (19 km) north of Berakit, Bintan Island, in the Singapore Strait (01°22′N 104°35′E).

=== 15 January ===
List of shipwrecks: 15 January 2019
Ship	State	Description
Rix Emerald	Cyprus	The cargo ship ran aground en route to Landskrona in Øresund, Sweden.
Tour 2	Panama	The tanker was driven aground by a storm in the Mediterranean Sea off Latakia, Syria. The ship was still aground as of 11 April. The vessel was scheduled to be refloated in the following two weeks.
Wardeh	Lebanon	The livestock carrier drifted aground in the Mediterranean Sea off Mersin, Turkey during a storm.

=== 17 January ===
List of shipwrecks: 17 January 2019
Ship	State	Description
Priboy	Russia	The tugboat capsized and sank at a pier at Temryuk on the Sea of Azov.

=== 21 January ===
List of shipwrecks: 21 January 2019
Ship	State	Description
Kandy; Maestro	Tanzania	Kerch Strait incident: An explosion and fire enveloped the two liquified gas carriers in the Black Sea. Of the 31 crew between the two ships, ten were killed. Fuel was being transferred between the two vessels at the time of the incident.
Oriental Nadeshiko	Panama	The product tanker ran aground at Elbe estuary east of Cuxhaven, Germany.
Zhongxing689	China	The cargo ship sank off Zhangzhou in the Taiwan Strait. Two crew were reported missing.

=== 29 January ===
List of shipwrecks: 29 January 2019
Ship	State	Description
Captain Jim	Canada	The 12-metre (39 ft 4 in) service boat sank after becoming disabled and taking on water near Devils Island at the mouth of Halifax Harbour. The captain and a passenger were rescued from a lifeboat but a crewmember perished in the sinking.

=== 30 January ===
List of shipwrecks: 30 January 2019
Ship	State	Description
Sea Frontier	Saint Kitts and Nevis	The tanker struck rocks two nautical miles (3.7 km) off Tanjung Penyusop in the Singapore Strait and sank partially submerged in shallow water. Still in place as of 8 February, salvage efforts continued.

=== 31 January ===
List of shipwrecks: 31 January 2019
Ship	State	Description
Kados	Iran	The cargo ship ran aground at Makhachkala Port in the Caspian Sea off Dagestan while unmooring.

== February ==
=== 4 February ===
List of shipwrecks: 4 February 2019
Ship	State	Description
Lucky Star 8	Indonesia	The cargo ship ran aground in the Sea of Japan near Olga Bay.
Solomon Trader	Hong Kong	The bulk carrier was pushed aground by a storm in Kangava Bay, Rennel Island, in the Solomon Sea.

=== 7 February ===
List of shipwrecks: 7 February 2019
Ship	State	Description
Koi 3	Sierra Leone	The tugboat collided with Shun Sheng (Hong Kong), capsized, and sank in Singapore Strait, west of Pulau Senang, after tanker kept sailing after collision.
Salim N1	Tanzania	The tanker was beached by a storm on the north coast of Cyprus near Famugusta.

=== 8 February ===
List of shipwrecks: 8 February 2019
Ship	State	Description
Ed McLaughlin	United States	The towboat capsized and sank in the Ohio River near Cheshire, Ohio, after it lost stability. All three crew safe after abandoning ship.

=== 11 February ===
List of shipwrecks: 11 February 2019
Ship	State	Description
Sinpyaung	Myanmar	The lighthouse/buoy tender sank at Lattphat Island in the Bay of Bengal. 7 crew rescued, 2 dead, 18 missing.

=== 15 February ===
List of shipwrecks: 15 February 2019
Ship	State	Description
Zhong Yuan Yu 11	China	The fishing vessel sank after a collision with Pesca Vaqueiro (Spain) northwest of the Falkland Islands in the South Atlantic Ocean. 30 crew rescued by other fishing vessels.

=== 16 February ===
List of shipwrecks: 16 February 2019
Ship	State	Description
Fehn Lyra	Latvia	The freighter was pushed ashore in bad weather 2 nautical miles (3.7 km) off Kefken, Kandıra on the Turkish coast east of the Bosphorus in the Black Sea.

=== 23 February ===
List of shipwrecks: 23 February 2019
Ship	State	Description
Unknown fishing vessel	China	An unidentified fishing vessel was sunk in a collision, possibly with Dong Fang Sheng (China) 80 nautical miles (150 km) east southeast of Ningbo in the South China Sea. Two crew rescued, five missing.

=== 24 February ===
List of shipwrecks: 24 February 2019
Ship	State	Description
Unknown fishing vessels	Unknown	A major conflagration at Jakarta destroyed at least 35 fishing vessels. Identities and flags of vessels unknown, but probably Indonesian.

== March ==
=== 1 March ===
List of shipwrecks: 1 March 2019
Ship	State	Description
Milagrosa J Tres	Philippines	The ferry ran aground off Bisucay Island in Cuyo, Palawan while en route to Iloilo. All passengers safe.

=== 2 March ===
List of shipwrecks: 2 March 2019
Ship	State	Description
Wavemaster 5	Singapore	The ferry ran aground at Karang Galang Reef off eastern coast of Batam, Indonesia en route to terminal.

=== 3 March ===
List of shipwrecks: 3 March 2019
Ship	State	Description
Sepano	Iran	The cargo ship ran aground in the Volga–Caspian Canal in Astrakhan, Russia.

=== 5 March ===
List of shipwrecks: 5 March 2019
Ship	State	Description
CB90	Swedish Navy	The Swedish Navy fast assault craft ran aground on Ladna Island in the Stockholm Archipelago with 18 troops and crew on board. Seven people injured.

=== 7 March ===
List of shipwrecks: 7 March 2019
Ship	State	Description
St. Rita	United States	The tugboat capsized and sank in the Mississippi River at LaPlace, Louisiana, when she collided with a barge. Her five crew climbed aboard the barge LTD 14161. The tugboat was later raised and declared a constructive total loss.

=== 9 March ===
List of shipwrecks: 9 March 2019
Ship	State	Description
Cardium	Netherlands	The inland cargo ship sank in heavy swells in the western Scheldt near Vlissingen. One crewmember rescued, one missing.

=== 12 March ===
List of shipwrecks: 12 March 2019
Ship	State	Description
Grande America	Italy	The ro-ro cargo ship caught fire in the Bay of Biscay 140 nautical miles (260 km) south west of Penmarch, Finistère, France and was abandoned by all 27 people on board. They were rescued by HMS Argyll (Royal Navy). The ship later capsized and sank.
Zhedaiyu 020611	China	The trawler sank in a collision with Vathy (Bahamas) east of the Yangtze Estuary in the Yellow Sea. Two crewmembers rescued, twelve missing.

=== 13 March ===
List of shipwrecks: 13 March 2019
Ship	State	Description
Maryland	Liberia	The bulk carrier ran aground in Kerch Strait off the Chushka Spit after veering off fairway. Refloated on 27 March.
Yusuf Celal	Turkey	The cargo ship ran aground near Topagac on Marmara Island in the Sea of Marmara and sank in shallow water with her stern and superstructure above water.

=== 14 March ===
List of shipwrecks: 14 March 2019
Ship	State	Description
Michelle Anne	United States	The tugboat ran up on the anchor chain of Iolcos Unity (Malta) causing the tug to capsize and sink in the Mississippi River between mile markers 224.5 and 226.

=== 15 March ===
List of shipwrecks: 15 March 2019
Ship	State	Description
Agios Georgios I	Greece	The tanker ran aground on Andros Island in the Aegean Sea while approaching port.

=== 18 March ===
List of shipwrecks: 18 March 2019
Ship	State	Description
Seattle Slew	United States	The tugboat capsized and sank in the Mississippi River near Pointe à la Hache, Louisiana, near Myrtle Grove, Plaquemines Parish, Louisiana. Two crewmen survived while the captain was presumed killed.

=== 19 March ===
List of shipwrecks: 19 March 2019
Ship	State	Description
SL Star	Comoros	The container ship capsized and sank along its berth at port in Bandar Abbas, Iran during cargo operations. 14 crew safe.

=== 20 March ===
List of shipwrecks: 20 March 2019
Ship	State	Description
Jean de la Lune	United Kingdom	The tall ship sank while moored at a harbour in Tenerife of the Canary Islands. No casualties reported.

=== 21 March ===
List of shipwrecks: 21 March 2019
Ship	State	Description
Unidentified ferry	Iraq	The ferry sank in the Tigris River near Mosul, Iraq, with 95 killed.

=== 23 March ===
List of shipwrecks: 23 March 2019
Ship	State	Description
Hagland Captain	Norway	The cargo ship was abandoned off the coast of Norway. Her crew were rescued by helicopter.
Viking Sky	Norway	The cruise ship suffered an engine failure off the coast of Norway. Four hundred and seventy-nine of the 1,373 passengers and crew were evacuated by helicopter before the ship managed to restart some of her engines and put in to Molde.

== April ==
=== 8 April ===
List of shipwrecks: 8 April 2019
Ship	State	Description
Al Fayrouz	Panama	The ro-ro ship was destroyed by fire in the Red Sea off Saudi Arabia. All 31 crew rescued by Riyadh and Al Ahsiq (Royal Saudi Navy).

=== 15 April ===
List of shipwrecks: 15 April 2019
Ship	State	Description
Unknown	Democratic Republic of Congo	The overloaded vessel sank on Lake Kivu. 35 people were rescued, with 13 dead, and 114 reported missing.

=== 22 April ===
List of shipwrecks: 22 April 2019
Ship	State	Description
Saluang	Indonesia	The landing craft capsized and sank at a pier at Belitang, Borneo, Indonesia in the Kapuas River.

=== 30 April ===
List of shipwrecks: 30 April 2019
Ship	State	Description
Diego Star 3	Comoros	The out-of-service longline fishing vessel sank off Port Louis, Mauritius, (20°09′S 57°28′E) where she had been anchored since June 2018 and heavily damaged by fire on 3 March 2019.

== May ==
=== 7 May ===
List of shipwrecks: 7 May 2019
Ship	State	Description
Masonic	United States	The 70-foot (21.3 m) longline fishing vessel ran aground on rocks in the Spanish Islands in Southeast Alaska, 80 miles (130 km) south of Sitka, Alaska.
Tenn Ming Yang No.268	Taiwan	The tuna fishing vessel caught fire in the Indian Ocean (34°54′S 41°50′E) 630 nautical miles (1,170 km; 720 mi) east of Durban, South Africa. The vessel was abandoned by her crew in a sinking condition.

=== 9 May ===
List of shipwrecks: 9 May 2019
Ship	State	Description
Phuong Nam 09	Vietnam	The cargo ship sank in the Gulf of Tonkin (20°13′N 106°50′E) south of Haiphong, Vietnam. All crewmen rescued.

=== 10 May ===
List of shipwrecks: May 2019
Ship	State	Description
4Ever Wild	Canada	The 18-metre (59 ft) whale-watching vessel struck a submerged rock in the Strait of Juan de Fuca and was beached. 43 passengers and six crew were rescued by three boats. 4Ever Wild was later towed to Sidney, British Columbia for assessment.

=== 12 May ===
List of shipwrecks: 12 May 2019
Ship	State	Description
Almarzoqah	Saudi Arabia	May 2019 Gulf of Oman incident: The tanker was attacked and damaged in the Gulf of Oman.
A. Michel	United Arab Emirates	May 2019 Gulf of Oman incident: The tanker was attacked and damaged in the Gulf of Oman.
Amjad	Saudi Arabia	May 2019 Gulf of Oman incident: The tanker was attacked and damaged in the Gulf of Oman.
Andrea Victory	Norway	May 2019 Gulf of Oman incident: The tanker was attacked and damaged in the Gulf of Oman by an explosion at her stern.

=== 18 May ===
List of shipwrecks: 18 May 2019
Ship	State	Description
Locar V	Brazil	The barge partially sank 50 nautical miles (93 km; 58 mi) southeast of Paranaguá, Brazil (29°02′S 47°34′W).

=== 25 May ===
List of shipwrecks: 25 May 2019
Ship	State	Description
Unidentified	Democratic Republic of Congo	The overloaded vessel sank during the evening on Lake Mai-Ndombe nearly 30 kilometres (19 mi) from Inongo, Democratic Republic of the Congo. Forty-five people were killed, 200 were reported missing.

=== 26 May ===
List of shipwrecks: 26 May 2019
Ship	State	Description
Senshou Maru	Japan	The cargo ship sank in a collision with Sumiho Maru (Japan) six nautical miles (11 km; 6.9 mi) south of Inobusaki Cape, Honshu. Four of the five crewmembers were reported missing.

=== 29 May ===
List of shipwrecks: 29 May 2019
Ship	State	Description
Hableány	Hungary	Salvage operations for Hableány. The river cruise boat capsized and sank in the Danube River at Budapest, Hungary, after colliding with the 135-metre (443 ft) cruise ship Viking Sigyn (Switzerland) in a heavy rainstorm. Seven passengers were rescued, and twenty-one passengers and two crew members were left missing. Later found 27 to be dead and one is still missing.

=== 31 May ===
List of shipwrecks: 26 May 2019
Ship	State	Description
Galapagos Majestic	Ecuador	The passenger ship ran aground on the north coast of Santiago Island in the Galapagos Islands, capsized and sank. All 26 aboard rescued.

== June ==
=== 4 June ===
List of shipwrecks: 4 June 2019
Ship	State	Description
Lintas Timur	Indonesia	The cargo ship sank in the Molucca Sea off east central Sulawesi, Indonesia, in a storm. One crewman rescued, 17 missing.

=== 8 June ===
List of shipwrecks: 8 June 2019
Ship	State	Description
No. 5 Elbe	Germany	The 38-metre (125 ft) schooner sank in a collision with Astrosprinter (Cyprus) in the Elbe River near Stade. All 43 on board were rescued. Raised 23 October, 2019. Repaired and returned to service 2026.

=== 9 June ===
List of shipwrecks: 9 June 2019
Ship	State	Description
FB Gimber1	Philippines	The fishing vessel sank after a Chinese fishing vessel collided with her while she was anchored off Reed Bank in the South China Sea. All 22 members of her crew survived, but the Chinese vessel left the scene without assisting them. A Vietnamese fishing vessel rescued them.

=== 13 June ===
List of shipwrecks: 13 June 2019
Ship	State	Description
Front Altair	Marshall Islands	June 2019 Gulf of Oman incident: The tanker was struck by an object suspected to be a torpedo and set afire in the Gulf of Oman. Her 23 crew were rescued.
Kokuka Courageous	Panama	Kokuka Courageous June 2019 Gulf of Oman incident: The tanker was struck by an object suspected to be a torpedo and set afire in the Gulf of Oman. Her 21 crew were rescued.

=== 15 June ===
List of shipwrecks: 15 June 2019
Ship	State	Description
Nusa Kenari 02	Indonesia	The passenger boat capsized off the shores of Alor, East Nusa Tenggara, after departing from Kalabahi. Three people were killed and four were missing.

=== 25 June ===
List of shipwrecks: 25 June 2019
Ship	State	Description
Tirta Amarta	Indonesia	The cargo ship sprung a leak and sank in the Java Sea 125 nautical miles (232 km; 144 mi) northwest of Surabaya. The crew were rescued by the motor vessel Seaspan Fraser (Hong Kong).
Voici Bernadette	Bolivia	The cargo ship, seized by the United States Government while operating as a drug smuggling vessel, was sunk as an artificial reef in the Atlantic Ocean in 100 feet (30 m) of water east of the St. Lucie Nuclear Power Plant, Jensen Beach, Florida.

=== 28 June ===
List of shipwrecks: 28 June 2019
Ship	State	Description
NA 95899 TS	Vietnam	The fishing vessel was sunk in a collision with Pacific 01 (China) in the Gulf of Tonkin 90 nautical miles (170 km; 100 mi) south east of Haiphong. Nine crewmen rescued by Pacific 01, ten missing.

== July ==
=== 3 July ===
List of shipwrecks: 3 July 2019
Ship	State	Description
Feng Kuo 568	Taiwan	The longliner caught fire in the Indian Ocean 1,400 nautical miles (2,600 km) south of Mauritius (33°27′S 35°45′E) and was abandoned to her fate by her crew. Crew rescued by Feng Kuo 669 (Taiwan). Was still adrift and burning on 4 July.
Mei Cheng 866	China	The coastal container ship was pushed ashore in heavy weather on the coast south west of Qinzhou, China and sank after battered by waves.

=== 5 July ===
List of shipwrecks: 5 July 2019
Ship	State	Description
Yuan Yu 15	China	The fishing vessel sank after an explosion in the Atlantic Ocean off Guinea Bissau. 3 crewmen dead, 3 missing and 15 rescued.

=== 9 July ===
List of shipwrecks: 9 July 2019
Ship	State	Description
LCT Evelia	Cameroon	The cargo ship sank in the Bight of Bonny in the Gulf of Guinea between Douala, Cameroon and Libreville, Gabon. Ten rescued and three missing.

=== 18 July ===
List of shipwrecks: 18 July 2019
Ship	State	Description
Sri Lanka Glory	none (probably Sri Lanka)	The cargo ship ran aground or was pushed ashore by a storm at Galle, Sri Lanka.

=== 26 July ===
List of shipwrecks: 26 July 2019
Ship	State	Description
Shabahang	Iran	The cargo ship sank in the Caspian Sea off Azerbaijan. All nine crewmen rescued by helicopters and a patrol boat.

=== 31 July ===
List of shipwrecks: 31 July 2019
Ship	State	Description
Pieces	Indonesia	The fishing vessel with 37 crew sank in the Makassar Strait during a trip from Pekalongan to Makassar. Three survivors and four bodies have been recovered as of 4 August.
Unknown	Thailand	Typhoon Wipha: Two barges receiving coal from Southampton (Marshall Islands) crashed into each other in heavy weather caused by the typhoon and sank at Ko Si Chang Island in the Gulf of Siam. The barges are expected to be salvaged.

== August ==
=== 1 August ===
List of shipwrecks: 1 August 2019
Ship	State	Description
Chia Kin No. 2	Taiwan	Typhoon Wipha: The freighter was driven ashore at Budai, Taiwan.

=== 2 August ===
List of shipwrecks: 2 August 2019
Ship	State	Description
Di Wei 506	China	Typhoon Wipha: The bulk carrier was sunk eight nautical miles (15 km; 9.2 mi) south of Macau. The crew were rescued five hours later just as a life raft began sinking.
Mingdelun	Singapore	The coaster (possibly named Beijing) sank off Wuqui Island in the Taiwan Straits after hitting a breakwater in heavy seas (Probably Typhoon Wipha related).

=== 3 August ===
List of shipwrecks: 3 August 2019
Ship	State	Description
Chi-Chi; Jenny Vince; Keziah 2	Philippines	A squall caused the capsizing of three passenger boats in the Iloilo Strait. A total of at least 30 people died from the three incidents which occurred separately within the same day.

=== 4 August ===
List of shipwrecks: 4 August 2019
Ship	State	Description
Coelleira	United Kingdom	Before salvage attempt After salvage attempt Wreck of Coelleira The fishing vessel ran aground on the Ve Skerries, Shetland. All fifteen crew were rescued by the Coastguard search & rescue helicopter dispatched from Sumburgh.

=== 7 August ===
List of shipwrecks: 7 August 2019
Ship	State	Description
Lady D	Cayman Islands	The yacht caught fire at Phuket, Thailand and burned out. She appears to be resting on the bottom.
Marujita	Ecuador	The purse seiner capsized and sank 336 nautical miles (622 km; 387 mi) south east of Clipperton Island, south of the Gulf of California. 25 crewmen and 12 coast guardsmen rescued by US Coast Guard.

=== 16 August ===
List of shipwrecks: 16 August 2019
Ship	State	Description
Pinar Del Rio	Cyprus	The ferry ran aground at the port entrance to Denia, Spain in the Balearic Sea after reportedly hitting the breakwater. She was later battered by waves and sank further. 400 people on board were rescued.

=== 22 August ===
List of shipwrecks: 22 August 2019
Ship	State	Description
La Nina	United States	The 75-foot (23 m) replica of Christoper Columbus's ship sank at dock in Corpus Christi, Texas. Refloated a few days later.
Santika Nusantara	Indonesia	During a voyage in Indonesia from Surabaya, East Java, Java, to Banjarmasin, South Kalimantan, Borneo, the passenger and vehicle ferry was destroyed by fire off Masalembu, East Java. Three people on board died; over 300 people were rescued.

=== 25 August ===
List of shipwrecks: 25 August 2019
Ship	State	Description
Austrheim	Norway	The ferry capsized and probably sank in the Gulf of Guinea between Calabar, Nigeria, and Cameroon. Three dead, 108 rescued, approximately 100 missing.

=== 31 August ===
List of shipwrecks: 31 August 2019
Ship	State	Description
Mika Mari VIII	Philippines	The ro-ro ferry capsized and partially sank at Barangay Consuelo, The Philippines on Camotes Island due to a truck sliding on deck and causing a list.

== September ==
=== 1 September ===
List of shipwrecks: 1 September 2019
Ship	State	Description
Kanuni D.S.	Turkey	The dredge sprung a leak off Bozcaada Island in the Aegean Sea. The dredge was beached to prevent sinking, unclear if on the shore of Bozcaada or the Turkish mainland.

=== 2 September ===
List of shipwrecks: 2 September 2019
Ship	State	Description
Conception	United States	The dive boat burned and sank in 64 feet (19.5 m) of water 20 yards (18 m) off Platts Harbor on the north side of California's Santa Cruz Island. The vessel The Grape Escape (United States) rescued five (of six) crew members. Thirty-four people (all 33 passengers and one crew member) died.

=== 6 September ===
List of shipwrecks: 6 September 2019
Ship	State	Description
Ji Shun 16	Togo	Typhoon Lingling: The container ship sank 20 nautical miles (37 km; 23 mi) north east of Zhoushan, China in the East China Sea (30°11′N 122°29′E).

=== 8 September ===
List of shipwrecks: 8 September 2019
Ship	State	Description
Golden Ray	Marshall Islands	Golden Ray The ro-ro car ferry rolled on to its port side and ran aground in shallow water off Brunswick, Georgia in St. Simon's Island sound. Scrapping in place began in November 2020. Salvage of 320,000 US gallons (1,200,000 L; 270,000 imp gal) of fuel completed in December 2019. Final section removed October 2021.

=== 12 September ===
List of shipwrecks: 12 September 2019
Ship	State	Description
Golf Argo	Bangladesh	The container lighter capsized and sank in Bangladeshi waters off Chittagong after engine failure in rough seas. 14 crew members were rescued by the Bangladesh Navy.

=== 25 September ===
List of shipwrecks: 25 September 2019
Ship	State	Description
Bukhta Naezdnik	Russia	The fishing trawler caught fire, capsized and sank at dock in Breivika port in Tromsø, Norway leading to around 100 evacuations as the burning vessel began listing. On-board were hazardous materials including a tank of ammonia and 200,000 litres (44,000 imp gal; 53,000 US gal) of diesel oil.

=== 26 September ===
List of shipwrecks: 26 September 2019
Ship	State	Description
Al Akhawayan	Morocco	The trawler was sunk in a collision with Montelaura (Panama) in the Atlantic Ocean, 35 nautical miles (65 km; 40 mi) west of Dakhla, Morocco.
Bourbon Rhode	Luxembourg	Hurricane Lorenzo: The tug sank 940 nautical miles (1,740 km) west of the Cape Verde Islands in the Atlantic Ocean (15°35′N 40°10′W). Three crewmen were rescued, seven missing, four bodies recovered.

=== 28 September ===
List of shipwrecks: 28 September 2019
Ship	State	Description
Bow Dalian	Singapore	The tanker was damaged at Ulsan, South Korea when fire spread from Stolt Groenland (Cayman Islands). Her crew were reported safe.
Stolt Groenland	Cayman Islands	The tanker suffered an onboard explosion and caught fire at Ulsan. Her 25 crew evacuated the ship.

== October ==
=== 1 October ===
List of shipwrecks: 1 October 2019
Ship	State	Description
Maria Veronica	Mexico	The tuna seiner caught fire, capsized and sank at dock at Manzanillo, Mexico.
Sheena M	Canada	The tugboat sank while working in Howe Sound near Gibsons, British Columbia. A local vessel rescued the crew. The wreck leaked roughly 10 litres (2.2 imp gal; 2.6 US gal) of fuel.

=== 6 October ===
List of shipwrecks: 6 October 2019
Ship	State	Description
Hongbo	China	The sand carrier capsized off the Penghu Islands near Taiwan in the Taiwan Straits. 12 crewmembers missing.
Jia Liang	China	The sand carrier sank off the Penghu Islands near Taiwan in the Taiwan Straits. 13 crewmembers rescued.

=== 7 October ===
List of shipwrecks: 7 October 2019
Ship	State	Description
Unidentified fishing vessel	North Korea	The fishing vessel sank in the Sea of Japan near the Yamato Shallows, about 350 kilometres (220 mi) northwest of Japan's Noto Peninsula, after she collided with an unidentified Japanese Fisheries Agency vessel that was chasing her out of Japan's exclusive economic zone. Japanese Fisheries Agency and Japan Coast Guard vessels rescued approximately 60 members of the North Korean vessel′s crew and transferred them to another North Korean vessel.

=== 12 October ===
List of shipwrecks: 12 October 2019
Ship	State	Description
Jia De	Panama	Typhoon Hagibis: The cargo ship sank off Kawasaki, Japan during the typhoon. Four crew were rescued, one dead and seven missing.

=== 18 October ===
List of shipwrecks: 18 October 2019
Ship	State	Description
Vietsun Integrity	Vietnam	The container ship developed a list to starboard and capsized and sank with hull partially above water in the Long Tau River. On 11 December an incident happened during salvage of the cargo. Two divers were killed, two injured and three missing.

=== 24 October ===
List of shipwrecks: 24 October 2019
Ship	State	Description
Nu-Shi Nalini	India	Cyclone Kyarr: The tanker ran aground near Panaji, Goa in rough seas from the cyclone in the Arabian Sea. Still aground as of 2 November.

=== 27 October ===
List of shipwrecks: 27 October 2019
Ship	State	Description
Avel Vor	France	The tuna fishing vessel struck a submerged obstruction causing a hull breach in the engine room 170 nautical miles (310 km; 200 mi) off Liberia in the Atlantic Ocean She sank on 29 October. All 22 crew rescued.
Vaishnav Devi Mata	India	Cyclone Kyarr: The fishing vessel sank in the cyclone in the Arabian Sea at (18°40′N 71°00′E). All 17 crewmen rescued by INS Teg (Indian Navy).

=== 28 October ===
List of shipwrecks: 28 October 2019
Ship	State	Description
Bhagvati Prem	India	Cyclone Kyarr: The hopper dredge ran aground in stormy weather from Cyclone Kyarr on Surakal Beach north of Bangalore, India. She was refloated and then beached to prevent sinking.

=== 30 October ===
List of shipwrecks: 30 October 2019
Ship	State	Description
Quang Vinh 09	Vietnam	Tropical Storm Matmo: The cargo ship was beached in the Gulf of Tonkin at Quy Nhon, Vietnam.

=== 31 October ===
List of shipwrecks: 31 October 2019
Ship	State	Description
Thanh Cong 999	Vietnam	Tropical Storm Matmo: The cargo ship sank in the Gulf of Tonkin 3 nautical miles (5.6 km; 3.5 mi) from Sơn Dương, Vietnam. Twelve crew members were rescued and one was reported missing.

== November ==
=== 4 November ===
List of shipwrecks: 4 November 2019
Ship	State	Description
American Glory	United States	The retired 215-foot (65.5 m) cruise ship was scuttled as an artificial reef in the North Atlantic Ocean 16.5 nautical miles (30.6 km; 19.0 mi) off Indian River Inlet, Delaware.

=== 9 November ===
List of shipwrecks: 9 November 2019
Ship	State	Description
Miss Hailee	United States	The 54-foot (16.5 m) fishing vessel – a commercial troller – capsized in the Pacific Ocean off the Sonoma Coast of Northern California about 30 miles (48 km) north of Bodega Bay. One man abandoned ship wearing a life jacket but disappeared and was presumed dead. The other three people on board – a woman and two men – were rescued from the water by a United States Coast Guard helicopter.

=== 10 November ===
List of shipwrecks: 10 November 2019
Ship	State	Description
LCT Maruni Pratama	Indonesia	The landing craft tank sank off Manokwari Regency, Indonesia. The crew were rescued by fishing boats.

=== 16 November ===
List of shipwrecks: 16 November 2019
Ship	State	Description
Lohengrin	Cayman Islands	The 161-foot (49.1 m) Trinity motor yacht was destroyed by fire at Universal Marine Center in Fort Lauderdale, Florida, while undergoing repairs and a refit. There was no loss of life.
Reflection	Jamaica	The 107-foot (32.6 m) Christensen motor yacht was destroyed by fire at Universal Marine Center in Fort Lauderdale, Florida, while undergoing repairs and a refit. There was no loss of life.

=== 20 November ===
List of shipwrecks: 20 November 2019
Ship	State	Description
Chang Xin	Taiwan	The cargo ship sank off Chuanshi Island, off the Minjiang River Estuary near Fuzhou in the Taiwan Straits, East China Sea after a collision with unknown vessel. Two crewmembers missing.

=== 22 November ===
List of shipwrecks: 23 November 2019
Ship	State	Description
Asia	Malaysia	The sailing yacht struck an obstruction, probably in the Banda Sea, and sank. Everyone was rescued.

=== 23 November ===
List of shipwrecks: 23 November 2019
Ship	State	Description
Mitra Sejahtera IX	Indonesia	The container ship capsized and sank south west of Makassar in the Java Sea. Everyone was rescued by passing ships.

=== 24 November ===
List of shipwrecks: xx November 2019
Ship	State	Description
Queen Hind	Palau	The cargo ship capsized at Midia, Romania. Her 22 crew were rescued. 33 of 14,600 sheep on board rescued. She was on a voyage from Midia to Jeddah, Saudi Arabia.

=== 29 November ===
List of shipwrecks: 29 November 2019
Ship	State	Description
Chief	United States	The shrimp boat capsized and sank in Mobile Bay north of Fort Morgan, Alabama. Her captain was rescued, two died.

=== 30 November ===
List of shipwrecks: 30 November 2019
Ship	State	Description
Toan Phat 68	Vietnam	The cargo ship sank in the Gulf of Tonkin, four nautical miles (7.4 km; 4.6 mi) off Quy Nhơn, Vietnam, in stormy seas. All 11 crew were rescued by search-and-rescue craft, but the captain died of a heart attack.

== December ==
=== 3 December ===
List of shipwrecks: 3 December 2019
Ship	State	Description
Citra Hasil	Indonesia	The cargo ship sank in the South China Sea (00°20′N 106°20′E) west of Ebeling Reef. The crew of ten were reported in the water.
Golden Bridge 2		The tanker sank in the Gulf of Siam off the Chao Praya River Estuary south of Bangkok, Thailand. Three crewmen were rescued.

=== 5 December ===
List of shipwrecks: 5 December 2019
Ship	State	Description
Min Shi Yu 07705	China	The fishing vessel capsized in the Taiwan Strait off Fujian, China. 13 crew were rescued, another 4 were reported missing.

=== 7 December ===
List of shipwrecks: 7 December 2019
Ship	State	Description
Elpida	Unknown	The 63-metre (207 ft) cargo ship was sunk as an artificial reef in 28 metres (92 ft) of water off the coast of Oroklini in the Oroklini marine protected area (34°57′N 33°41′E), Cyprus.

=== 9 December ===
List of shipwrecks: 9 December 2019
Ship	State	Description
Anglican Lady	Canada	The tug ran aground in Lake St. Clair. Still aground as of 11 December.
Bay Tiger	United States	The shrimp boat sank in Pensacola Bay one mile (1.6 km) south of Warrington, Florida in 20 feet (6.1 m) of water. The wreck was later removed.

=== 10 December ===
List of shipwrecks: 10 December 2019
Ship	State	Description
KM Shippo 16	Indonesia	The cargo ship capsized and sank at dock at Lewobela on Lembata Island, Indonesia, in the Banda Sea.
Lef1	Unknown	The 15-metre (49 ft) vessel was sunk as an artificial reef in 15 metres (49 ft) of water off the coast of Oroklini in the Oroklini marine protected area (34°57′N 33°40′E), Cyprus.

=== 11 December ===
List of shipwrecks: 11 December 2019
Ship	State	Description
Hamada S	Togo	The freighter dragged anchor in a storm and went ashore at Bizerte, Tunisia.

=== 12 December ===
List of shipwrecks: 12 December 2019
Ship	State	Description
Chita	Russian Navy	The decommissioned Kilo-class submarine sank in the Sea of Japan while under tow to a dismantling yard with her stern on the bottom and bow above water. The vessel was expected to be refloated.

=== 15 December ===
List of shipwrecks: 15 December 2019
Ship	State	Description
PD-16	Russian Navy	The decommissioned drydock sank at Sevastopol with the decommissioned Tango-class submarine B-380 Gorgorvskiy Komsomolets in it.

=== 16 December ===
List of shipwrecks: 16 December 2019
Ship	State	Description
Hua Xia 68	China	The cargo ship sank in shallow water with part of the ship above water off Nanji Island, China. All 11 crew were rescued by a passing cargo ship from life rafts.

=== 18 December ===
List of shipwrecks: 18 December 2019
Ship	State	Description
Andiamo	United States	While docked at Island Gardens Marina off MacArthur Causeway in Miami, Florida, the US$7,000,000 120-foot (36.6 m) luxury yacht – the property of salsa singer Marc Anthony – burned, capsized, and sank in shallow water with part of the vessel above water at Watson Island in Biscayne Bay. Two crew members — the only people on board – escaped without injury.

=== 22 December ===
List of shipwrecks: 22 December 2019
Ship	State	Description
Cdry Blue	Italy	The cargo ship ran aground on the Torre Cannai Rocks, Sardegna. Italy. Her crew were rescued.
Orca	unknown	The barge rolled onto her port side and sank in the harbor at Puerto Baquerizo Moreno on San Cristóbal Island in the Galápagos Islands when a crane on a pier she was tied up to toppled over onto her deck while unloading cargo from her. Orca's crew and the crane operator jumped overboard and survived.

=== 23 December ===
List of shipwrecks: 23 December 2019
Ship	State	Description
Edelweiss	Cyprus	The bulk carrier ran aground in the southern Makassar Strait/Java Sea north of Masalima Island, Indonesia. The vessel was still aground as of 30 December.

=== 25 December ===
List of shipwrecks: 25 December 2019
Ship	State	Description
Nevado 35	Russia	The cargo ship ran aground in the area of Şarköy, Tekirdağ Province, Turkey in the Sea of Marmara. The vessel was refloated on 5 January.
Zelek Star	Turkey	The cargo ship dragged anchor and grounded on the beach at Ashdod, Israel. The vessel was still aground as of 31 December.

=== 28 December ===
List of shipwrecks: 28 December 2019
Ship	State	Description
Fay	Norway	The fishing vessel sank in the Barents Sea north of Honningsvag, Norway. Her 12 crew were rescued.

=== 31 December ===
List of shipwrecks: 31 December 2019
Ship	State	Description
FV Scandies Rose	United States	During a voyage carrying crab pots from Kodiak, Alaska, to fishing grounds in the Bering Sea with a crew of seven men on board, the 130-foot (39.6 m) fishing vessel sank quickly in the Gulf of Alaska near Sutwik Island off the Alaska Peninsula, 180 nautical miles (330 km; 210 mi) southwest of Kodiak. Four hours after the sinking, a United States Coast Guard helicopter rescued two survivors from a life raft on 1 January 2020, but the other five members of her crew disappeared and were presumed dead.
Unidentified fishing vessel	South Korea	The fishing vessel was sunk in a collision with the motor vessel Subaru (Russia) in the Sea of Japan southeast of Pohang, South Korea. All 12 crew were rescued by another South Korean fishing vessel.
