= Sinking of MV Conception =

2019 maritime disaster

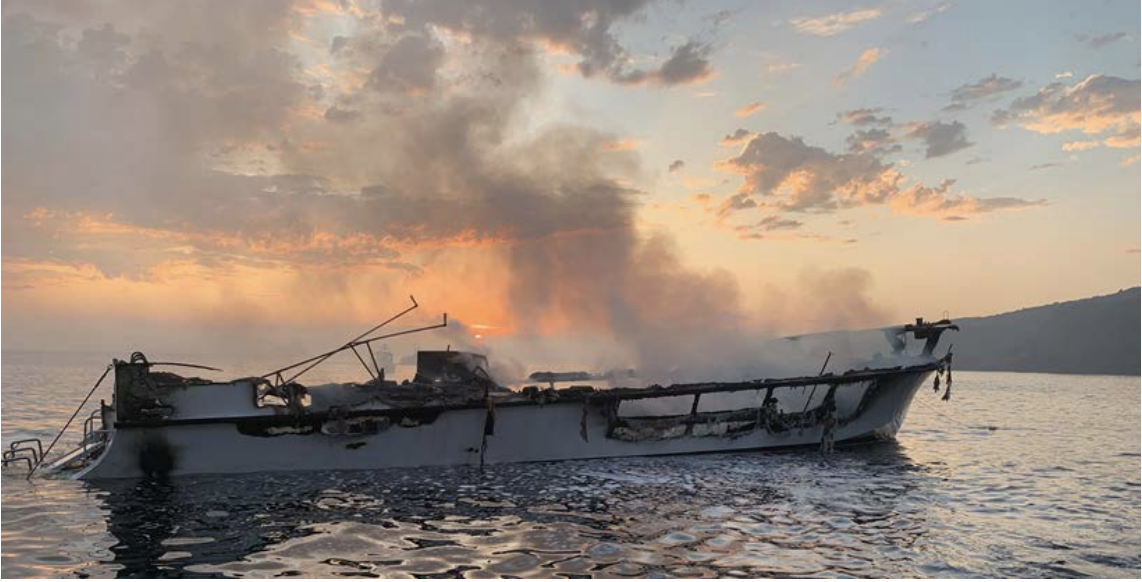
- Conception at dawn on September 2, shortly after the fire was extinguished (photo by Ventura County Fire Department)
- Date: September 2, 2019
- Time: Approximately 3 a.m. PDT UTC−07:00
- Location: Platts Harbor, Santa Cruz Island, California, United States; 34°02′51″N 119°44′06″W
- Cause: Fire
- Outcome: (See Aftermath section)
- Deaths: 34
- Injuries: 5
Location of sinking in Channel Islands:
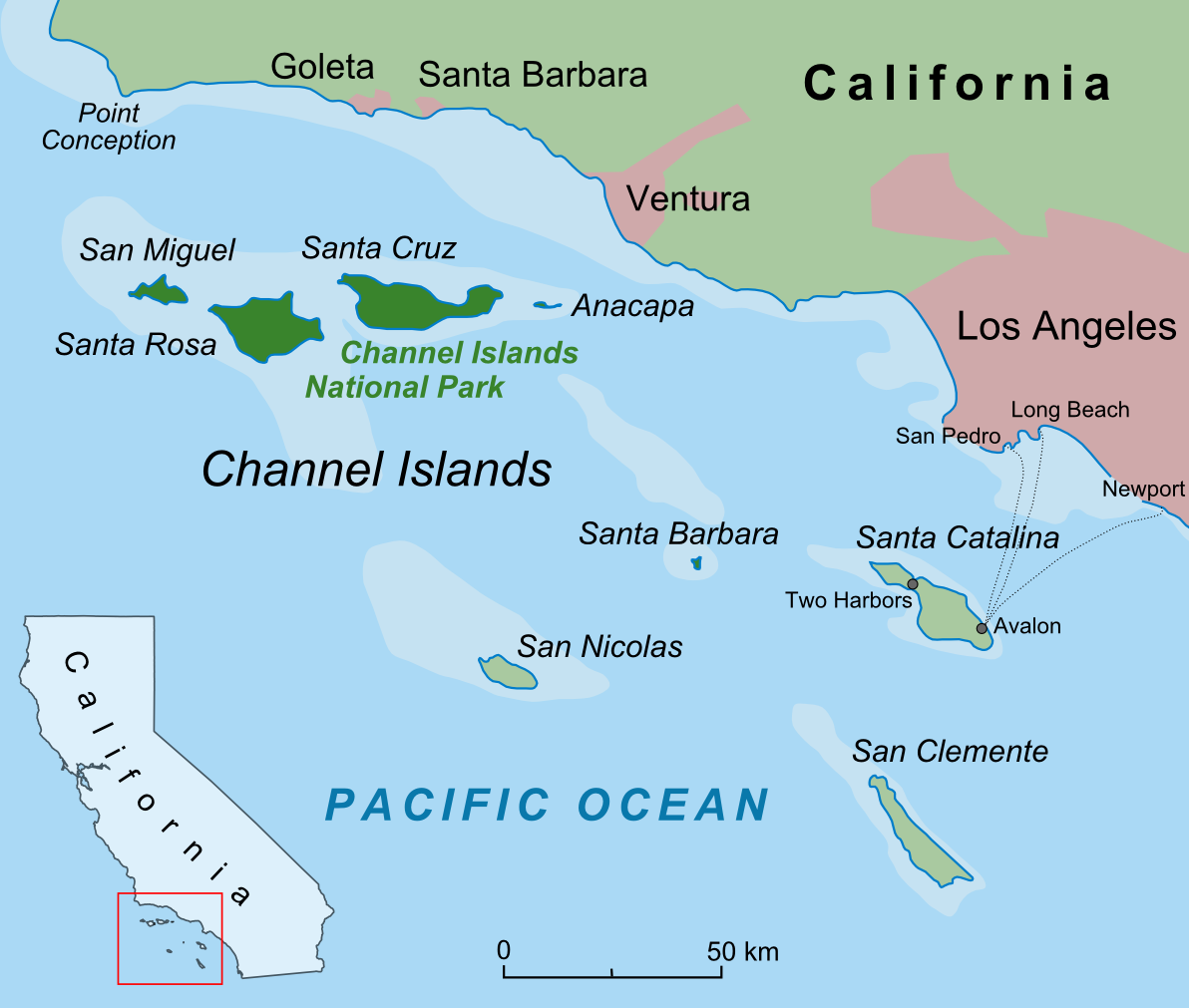
- MV Conception (USA California Channel Islands) MV Conception (California)

The sinking of MV Conception occurred on September 2, 2019 after the 75-foot (23 m) dive boat caught fire and eventually sank off the coast of Santa Cruz Island, California, United States, killing 34 of 39 people aboard. The boat was anchored overnight at Platts Harbor, a small undeveloped bay on the island's north shore, when a fire broke out on the main deck shortly after 3 a.m. The 33 passengers and 1 crew member who were sleeping below the main deck were trapped by the fire and killed. The remaining 5 crew had sleeping berths on the top deck and were able to escape. The five survivors placed an initial mayday call to the Coast Guard and attempted to alert the people below deck but all routes to the main sleeping area were blocked by fire and they were forced to jump overboard. The surviving crew retrieved the Conception's skiff and motored to a nearby boat where a second radio dispatch was made. The rescue and recovery operations were coordinated by the United States Coast Guard.

The sinking is the worst maritime disaster in California since the sinking of the Brother Jonathan in 1865 and the deadliest in the United States overall since the USS Iowa turret explosion in 1989.

== Boat ==
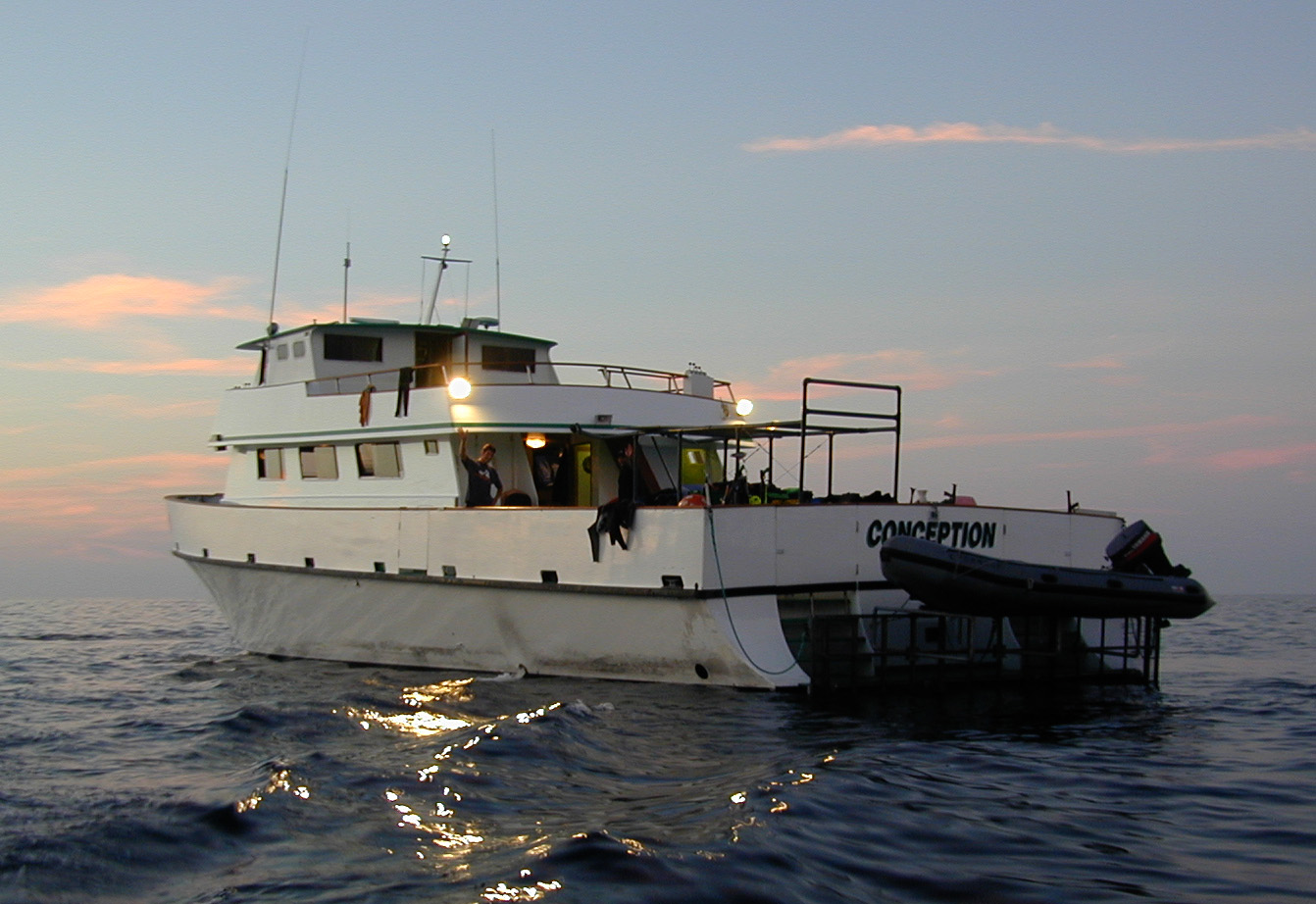
The Conception anchored at Avalon, Santa Catalina Island, in May 2000

Motor vessel (initialized "MV") Conception was a 75-foot (23 m) liveaboard boat built in Long Beach, California, and launched in 1981. She was one of three dive boats owned by Truth Aquatics, which operated charter excursions from Santa Barbara Harbor for groups of divers interested in exploring the Channel Islands, located close to the coast of Southern California across the Santa Barbara Channel from Santa Barbara and Ventura County. Conception was under charter to Worldwide Diving Adventures (WDA) for a three-day scuba diving excursion over the Labor Day holiday weekend, which was one of WDA's most popular diving tour packages. The boat had been refurbished at a cost of more than $1 million following an incident in 2005 when it had been stolen and run aground.

Federal and international regulations require boats over a certain size to be made of fire-resistant materials and to include fire sprinklers and smoke detectors wired into the ship's electronics or linked to the bridge. Given the vessel's age and size, Conception was not covered by those regulations. She measured less than 100 GT and had fewer than 49 berths. She was made of wood covered with fiberglass, as permitted by regulations last updated in 1978. At the time of the fire, Conception was believed to be in compliance with those regulations, and the most recent Coast Guard inspections in February 2019 and August 2018 did not result in any noteworthy violations. According to the vessel's Certificate of Inspection, she had a maximum capacity of 103: four crew and 99 passengers; one crewmember was required to be designated as a roving patrol at all times when the passenger bunks were occupied.

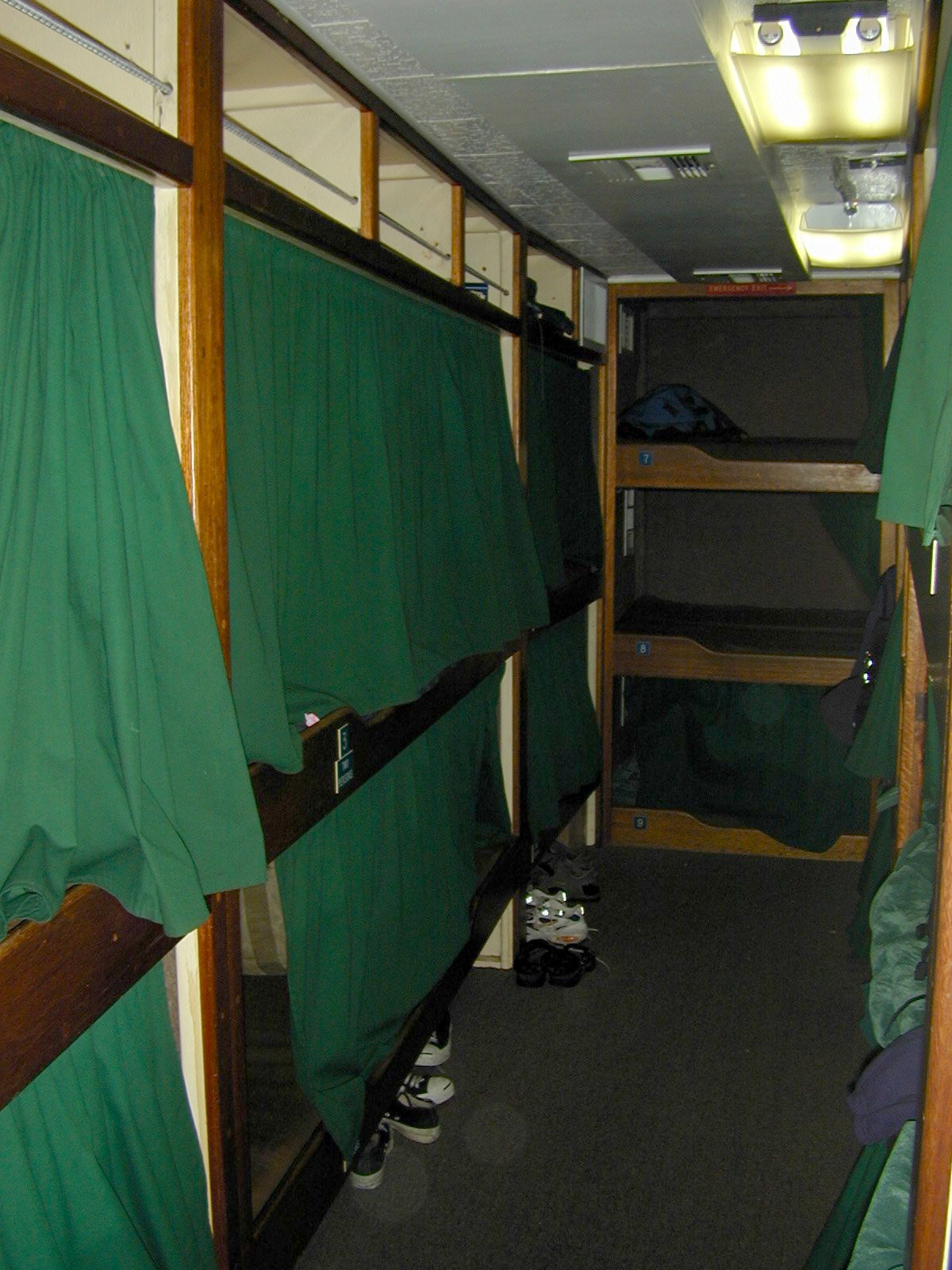
Conception lower deck bunk room, starboard side facing aft, from a May 2003 dive trip

The boat was laid out with three decks. The upper deck contained the wheelhouse, crew quarters, and a sun deck lounge area. The main deck, just below the upper deck, included a large cabin, which had a galley (in the forward portion of the cabin) where the crew could prepare meals and a salon (in the aft portion) with seating for meals. The salon was accessed from the stern through a hallway lined with restrooms. On the lower deck, up to 46 individuals could sleep in 13 double bunks (12 of which were stacked in twos) and 20 single bunks (18 stacked in threes), with one labeled as reserved for crew. The lower deck also contained the shower area, anchor locker, engine room, and lazarette (a machinery space). The rest of the crew berths were located two decks above, in the aft portion of the wheelhouse on the upper deck.

According to the deck plans, the main access to the guest accommodations on the lower deck was the forward stairway connected to the galley and main deck cabin. The designer of the vessel stated that there were two exits from the lower deck bunk room: a forward staircase at the bow end of the vessel that led up to the galley area, and an aft escape hatch located above one of the bunks, which led to the salon. After exiting the aft escape hatch, a person would still be within the main deck cabin, approximately 3 to 4 feet (0.9 to 1.2 m) forward of the exit to the main deck. Some former dive passengers could only recall the forward stairway exit and could not recall if they had been briefed on the presence of the aft emergency escape hatch. Santa Barbara County Sheriff Bill Brown stated both exits appeared to have been blocked by fire during the disaster.

== Fire ==
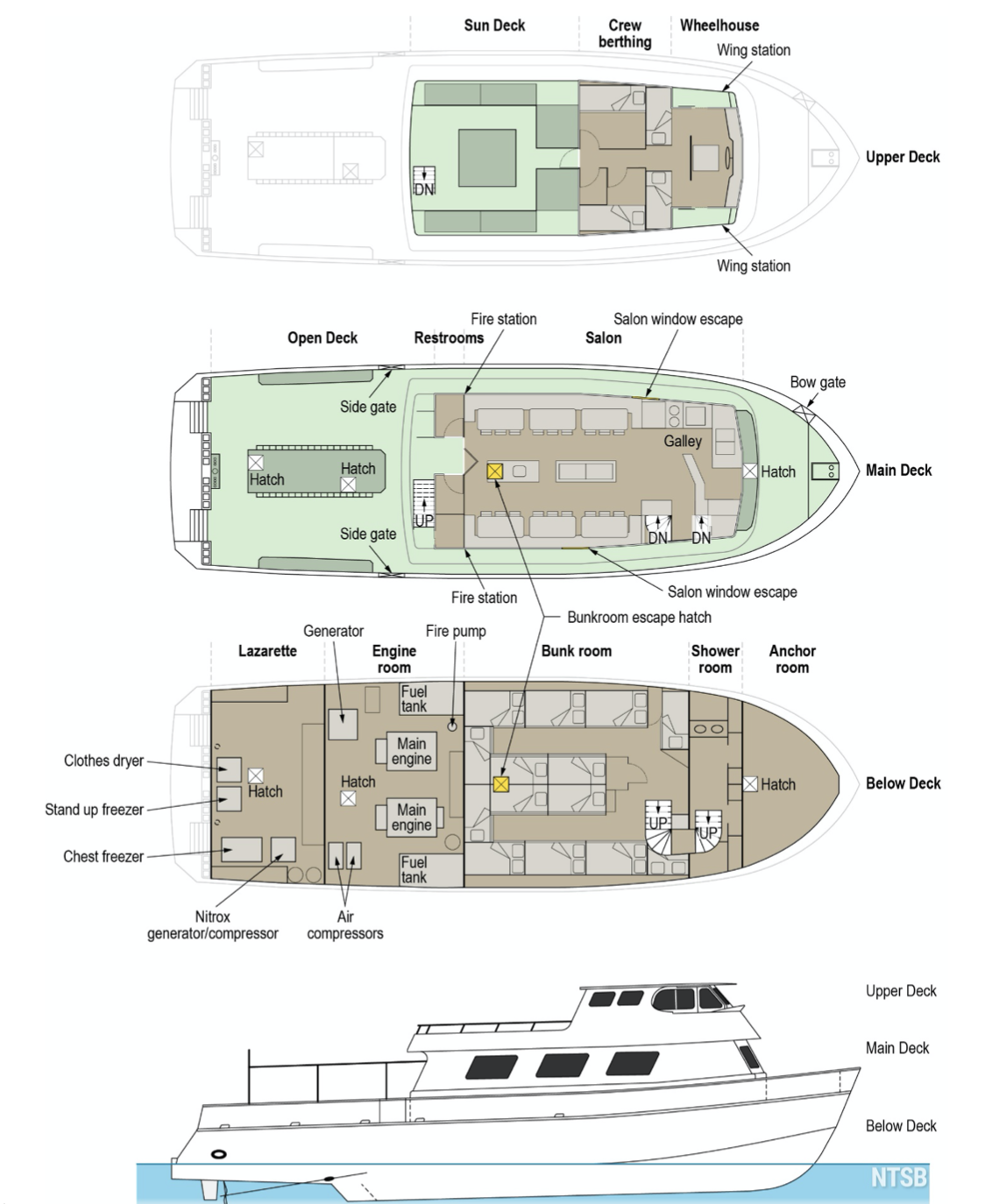
General arrangement of decks, MV Conception (from NTSB factual report)

=== Voyage ===
Conception departed Santa Barbara Harbor at 4:04 a.m. on August 31 and arrived at a dive location near Albert Anchorage, on the south side of Santa Cruz Island, by 8:30 a.m. that morning. The six-person crew consisted of the captain, a second captain (the Truth Aquatics title for mate), first and second deckhands, and first and second galleyhands. Upon arrival and while eating breakfast, the first deckhand conducted a safety briefing, which was interrupted when a passenger fainted; after the passenger was revived, the captain continued the briefing. Conception then sailed to the eastern side of the island and anchored in Smuggler's Cove overnight. As part of their regular nighttime routine, the crew had an unwritten policy to shut down the circuit breakers to de-energize the galley burners and griddle.

The excursion held a night dive at Quail Rock, on the northern coast near the western end of the island, from 8:30 p.m. to 9:30 p.m. on September 1. The returning divers stowed flashlights, cameras, and photo strobes on the two aft tables in the salon; some of these were plugged in to charge alongside cellular phones and tablets. The first galleyhand recalled that when he plugged in his phone to charge that night, he "saw sparks" at the receptacle.

=== Discovery of the fire ===
On the night of the fire, the second galleyhand woke at approximately 1:30 a.m. and went to the galley to wash dishes; he did not see any other passengers or crew awake at the time. After emptying the trash, he went back to sleep in the crew quarters on the upper deck at approximately 2:35 a.m. He later awoke to the sound of a pop in the dark and believed it to be a disoriented crew member or passenger. Upon leaving his bed to attempt to aid the individual, he discovered an uncontrollable fire on the main deck below. The fire had already spread to the aft end of the upper deck, and was blocking their way to the main deck, as the aft ladder was already engulfed in flames. The second galleyhand returned to wake the remaining crew on the upper deck, and two mayday calls were placed at approximately 3:14 a.m. from the wheelhouse of the Conception.

The five crew members that had been sleeping on the upper deck jumped down to the main deck and one broke his leg in the process. The second galleyhand was the first to descend, lowering himself after leaving the wheelhouse through the wing station door on the port side of the boat. He tried to go aft to retrieve fire extinguishers, but his path was blocked by smoke and flames billowing out of the salon windows. The first deckhand followed soon after the second galleyhand; the second galleyhand saw him come down and turned back from the smoke and flames. As the second galleyhand was turning around towards the bow, the first galleyhand was jumping down from the port side of the wheelhouse; the first galleyhand landed awkwardly and broke his left leg, and the second galleyhand hurdled over him while running forward.

The ship's captain said the aft escape hatch was engulfed in fire and the surviving crew could do nothing to help the passengers and the second deckhand, who were all sleeping in the lower deck berths. The first deckhand and second galleyhand then attempted to access the main deck cabin through the center window in the forward section of the boat; although the window was not hot, it could not be opened and only thick smoke could be seen through the window. Flames prevented the crew from accessing the salon along both the port and starboard exterior walkways to rescue the trapped passengers.

=== Mayday calls and abandoning the boat ===
At this time, the captain was transmitting mayday signals; after connecting to the watchstanders at Coast Guard Sector Los Angeles/Long Beach, the captain transmitted "39 POB [people on board]. I can't breathe. 39 POB. Platts." The captain then jumped directly into the ocean from the starboard wing door; since smoke was trailing behind him, several crewmembers thought he was on fire and the second captain followed him into the ocean to assist. The first deckhand remembered there was an axe in the wheelhouse just as the captain leapt, but since the captain was the last to leave the wheelhouse, it could not be retrieved. Access to the firefighting stations, at the port and starboard exterior sides of the aft end of the saloon, was blocked by the fire. Trapped by the fire, the first deckhand and second galleyhand followed the captains into the water; the second galleyhand encouraged the first galleyhand to abandon ship as well, which he was able to do through the port bow gate.

According to a video recovered by the FBI from victim Patricia Ann Beitzinger's iPhone, by 3:17 am passengers in the lower deck were awake and attempting to escape.

All five crew members eventually leapt into the ocean from the bow to escape the fire; the second captain, the first deckhand, and the captain retrieved the boat's skiff (an inflatable dinghy) from the stern, and, after retrieving the remaining crew, paddled approximately 200 yards (180 m) to the only boat moored nearby, the Grape Escape. Both the second captain and first deckhand reboarded the stern of Conception, and both were unable to access the lower deck in separate attempts. The first deckhand attempted to enter the engine room on the lower deck to start the fire pump, but the space was filled with white/grey smoke. The second captain noted the stricken vessel still had power while using the electric winch to lower the skiff from the stern. Once the skiff was in the water, the two were commanded by the captain to abandon Conception again.

The surviving crew put out another mayday alert from the Grape Escape at 3:29 a.m. and the second captain and first deckhand returned to the Conception in the skiff to search for survivors. While waiting for aid, small explosions were heard from the Conception, believed by the crew to be caused by the pressurized dive cylinders bursting from the heat of the fire. One of the distress calls sent from the Conception initially suggested that at least one individual below deck was awake, as a man's voice was recorded screaming "Mayday! Mayday! Mayday! I can't breathe!" However, Glen Fritzler, the owner of Truth Aquatics, clarified the first mayday calls had been made by the captain of the Conception from the wheelhouse before he evacuated from the boat.

=== Emergency response ===
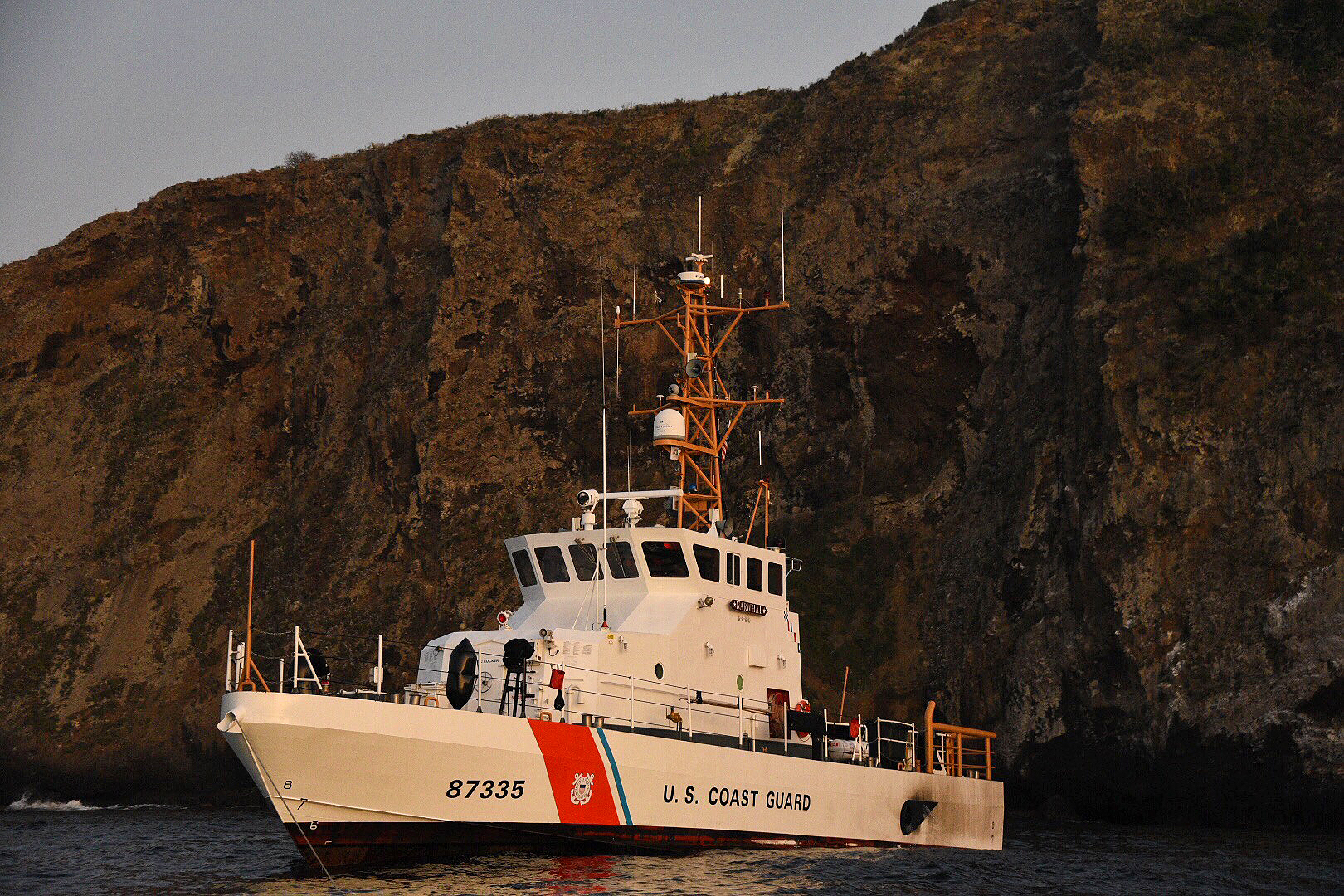
USCGC Narwhal at Santa Cruz Island (September 2019)

Coast Guard Sector Los Angeles–Long Beach received the mayday calls at approximately 3:14 a.m. The call was received via Channel 16 VHF, advising that Conception was in distress with 39 persons on board. Because the captain had abandoned the boat shortly afterward and was unable to respond to follow-up requests, a precise location was not provided and the emergency had not been declared as a fire; the location was estimated from the last automatic identification system broadcast from Conception, and the Sector Command Center (SCC) in San Pedro issued an Urgent Marine Information Broadcast (UMIB) at 3:22 a.m. Boats and helicopters from the Coast Guard, the Ventura County and Santa Barbara County Fire Departments, and a private company, TowBoatUS Ventura (formerly Vessel Assist Ventura) were dispatched to the site.

The SCC telephoned Coast Guard Station Channel Islands Harbor (in Ventura) at 3:23 a.m. to dispatch them to the scene for a medical emergency. Channel Islands Harbor Station personnel radioed the Ventura County Fire Department (VCFD) and requested Medic Engine 53 (the closest unit) to respond to the scene aboard a Coast Guard vessel which was preparing to leave. The SCC also coordinated the dispatch of USCGC Narwhal (WPB-87335), based in Corona Del Mar, and CG 6540, a HH-65 Dolphin helicopter which had been forward deployed to Point Mugu from Air Station San Francisco. The SCC learned the emergency was a fire after the captain of the Grape Escape radioed the Coast Guard at 3:29 a.m.; during the ensuing dialogue, the captain of the Conception clarified that five had escaped, but 34 were still trapped aboard and the vessel was "fully engulfed [with flames] to the deck". Upon hearing the conversation, Channel Islands Harbor Station launched Response Boat-Medium (RB-M) CG 45643 at 3:42 a.m. immediately. The VCFD crew arrived at 3:46 a.m., and RB-M CG 45739 was launched at 3:49 a.m. with them on board, after they had been briefed. Channel Islands Harbor Patrol dispatched Boat 15 at 4:04 a.m. with the crew of VCFD Engine 54 aboard, and Ventura City Harbor Patrol dispatched Boat 1 at 4:56 a.m. with the crew of VCFD Engine 26. In between, TowBoatUS Ventura dispatched Retriever II, a 26 ft (7.9 m) Ambar AM800 rigid-hull inflatable boat, from Ventura Harbor by 4:21 a.m.

Key locations for final voyage of Conception and responding sites (all times local)
1 Aug 31, 4 a.m.: Conception departs Sea Landing / Santa Barbara Harbor for a three-day dive excursion, chartered by Worldwide Diving Adventures
2 Sep 2, early morning: Fire starts aboard Conception, anchored overnight in Platts Harbor, Santa Cruz Island
3 3:14 a.m.: Sector LA/LB receives first mayday calls
4 3:23–3:42 a.m.: Station CIH alerted & dispatches two RB–Ms to site (both arrive 4:32 a.m.); more firefighting boats dispatched at 4 & 5 a.m.
5 3:25–4:22 a.m.: CGAS SF, FOB Point Mugu alerted & dispatches HH-65 Dolphin helicopter (arrives 4:32 a.m.)
6 4:21 a.m.: TowBoatUS Ventura Retriever II enroute to scene, arrives by 5:04 a.m.
7 approx. 6 a.m.: Narwhal dispatched from Corona del Mar

At 4:17 a.m., the Coast Guard advised the surviving crew aboard the Grape Escape to set out again to search for survivors; they searched fruitlessly in the waters around Conception as well as the rocks of Platts Harbor. The first responders arrived onsite at 4:32 a.m. aboard CG 45643, CG 45739, and CG 6540; the Ventura County paramedic and engineer aboard CG 45739 subsequently boarded Grape Escape at 4:38 a.m. to treat the injured first galleyhand. The rigging on Grape Escape made a helicopter rescue too challenging, so Grape Escape proceeded to Station Channel Islands Harbor, starting at 4:55 a.m. carrying the surviving crew except the captain, who remained onsite aboard CG 45739 to assist.

=== Fire fighting and sinking ===
After arriving onsite, officials struggled to fight the fire, as the boat was in a remote location with limited firefighting resources, and the fire was moving quickly and kept flaring up. The anchor line of the Conception burned through and the boat began to drift towards the island, raising fears it might ignite onshore vegetation. In addition, since Conception had drifted into shallower waters, most of the fireboats on-scene were unable to continue fighting the fire for lack of clearance, including a shallow-draft Santa Barbara Harbor Patrol boat.

Although the two initial-response RB-Ms onsite had portable 250 US gal/min (950 L/min) dewatering pumps that could be used for firefighting, the VCFD determined they would not be effective, and they began searching the waters for survivors, as the magnitude of the fire aboard Conception meant there was no one left alive on board the vessel. Boat 15 would be the primary firefighting boat after it arrived at 4:55 a.m., as it had greater pump capacity and carried firefighting foam. The helicopter CG 6540 remained on station until forced to return to Point Mugu for fuel at 5:09 a.m., using their forward-looking infrared (FLIR) camera to search for potential survivors in the water; conditions were excellent for the search, and the FLIR was able to pick up seagulls from a distance of 1/2 mi (0.80 km), but no survivors were found.

In order to attempt to fight the fire and allow fireboats to reach the vessel, a grappling line was secured and the still-burning Conception was towed out to deeper water by Retriever II. Boat 15 reported the fire was extinguished by 5:23 a.m., although hotspots kept reigniting. The fire had burned to the waterline of the hull, which was also full of water from firefighting efforts. The hull was not stable enough to place pumps on board to dewater it. Conception was then towed by Retriever II back to shallower waters to aid in its recovery, but the boat sank stern-first about four hours after the fire broke out at 6:54 a.m., coming to rest upside-down at a depth of 64 feet (20 m) approximately 20 yards (18 m) from the north shore of Santa Cruz Island. The first victim was pulled from the water at 8:04 a.m.

Coast Guard cutter Narwhal arrived at 8:32 a.m., approximately two hours after being dispatched and assumed on-scene command upon arrival, remaining at Platts Harbor for four days to coordinate rescue and recovery operations. The Coast Guard suspended their search for survivors at 9:40 a.m. on September 3 after spending 23 hours combing 160 mi^{2} (410 km^{2}) of the waters north of Santa Cruz Island with five MH-65 Dolphin helicopter crews, two Response Boat – Medium crews, and the Narwhal.

== Victims ==
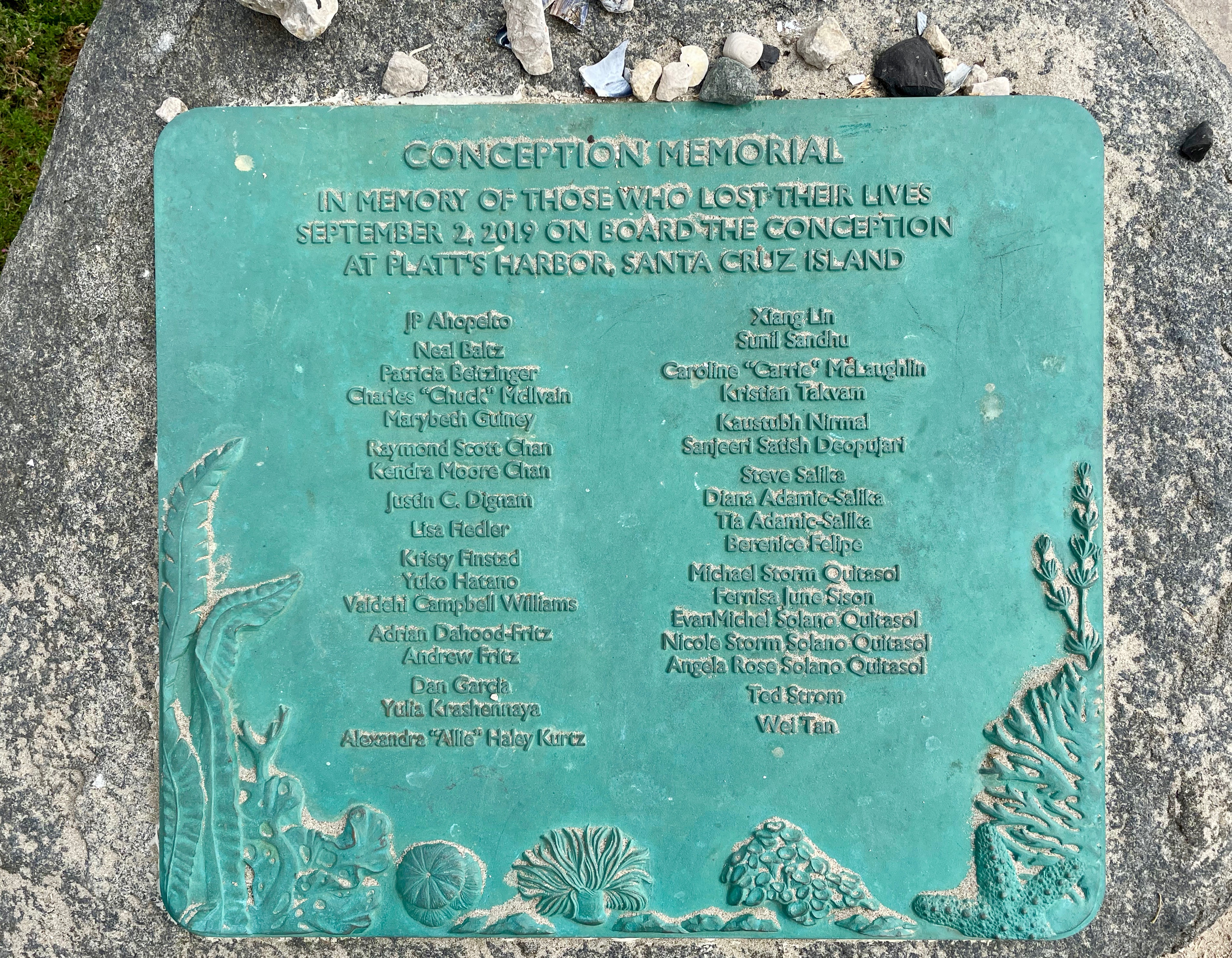
Memorial plaque for victims, placed in September 2020

All 33 of the Conception's passengers and one of its six crew members were killed the night of the fire; the other five crew members, including the captain, escaped with injuries. The 34 killed were all sleeping in the lower deck bunkroom. Divers located 25 bodies by September 2, while nine other people remained missing. Four floating bodies were initially recovered at the time of the sinking, and another sixteen were pulled from the water later. Another five bodies were visible in the vessel but unreachable because of concerns about unsafe conditions on the boat. The Coast Guard suspended search efforts on the morning of September 3, as it required the wreckage to be stabilized before searching it for further bodies. At that time, the unaccounted victims were presumed dead. By September 4, all but one of the bodies had been recovered, with around 80 divers from six different agencies searching including members of the Federal Bureau of Investigation (FBI). The last body was located by divers from the Santa Barbara County Sheriff and recovered on September 11.

Most of the victims were from California. One couple was from Arizona. Two of the victims were confirmed to be Singaporean. Two victims were from India, living in Stamford, Connecticut. Two of the victims were students at an elite Santa Cruz high school. It is believed that the youngest was age 16 and the oldest were in their 60s, with a majority of the victims from Santa Cruz and the Bay Area.

DNA from family members was used by the Santa Barbara County coroner to identify the bodies. Identification was delayed by the loss of the onboard passenger manifest and difficulties in locating a second copy. Twenty-three of the bodies were identified with the assistance of a private company that had developed a form of rapid DNA technology previously used to identify Camp Fire victims. All 34 victims were identified by September 12.

The coroner determined that the cause of death was smoke inhalation, determined by toxicology tests showing lethal levels of carbon monoxide in their blood and the presence of black soot in their tracheas. The coroner was unable to determine the victims' locations within the bunk room, but several were found wearing shoes or sandals, jackets, and one was holding a flashlight; a prior Conception passenger stated it was possible that some victims were keeping warm overnight, and the presence of clothing and shoes did not necessarily indicate they were trying to escape.

== Investigation ==
Conception photographs from summer 1995

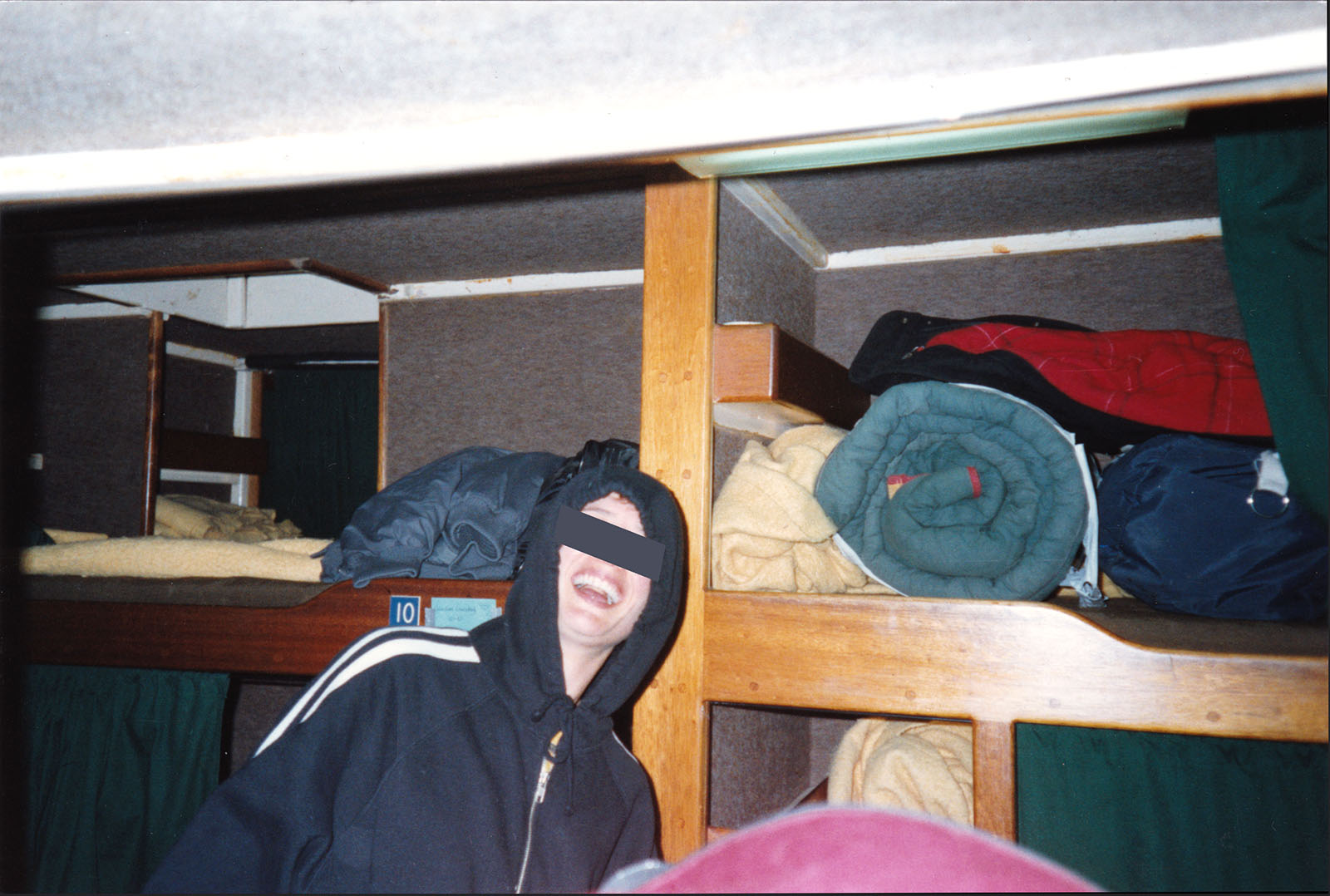
Bunk room and aft escape hatch (above bunk #10), view directed portside

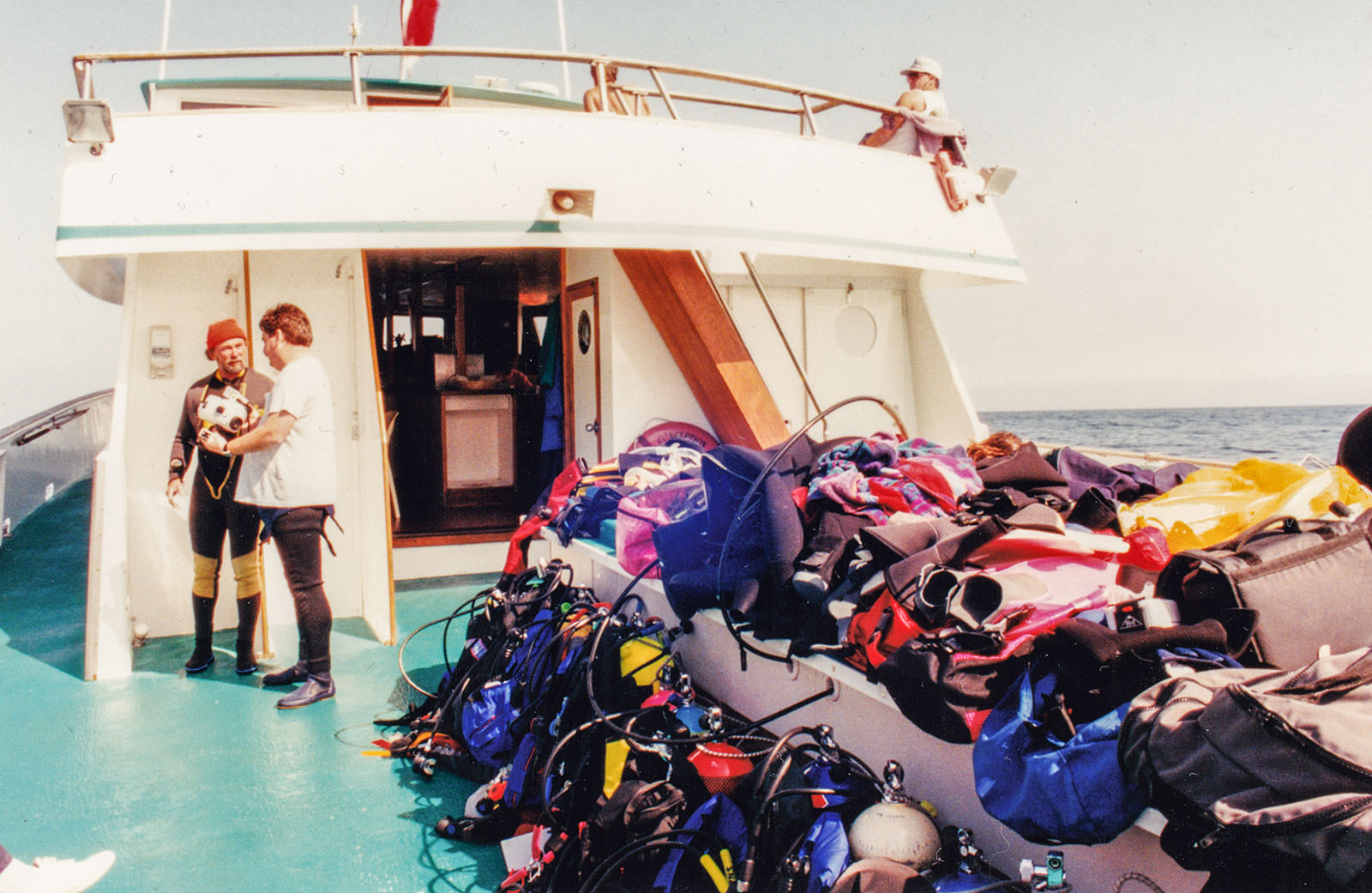
Main deck, view towards bow into salon. Aft escape hatch exit is centered just inside the main deck cabin.

Truth Aquatics had a good reputation locally, and maintained their boats in good condition, according to state Senator Hannah-Beth Jackson, who represented the Santa Barbara area. Local entrepreneur Ken Kurtis, owner of a dive charter company, told The Maritime Executive it was the only major fire he was aware of on a Californian dive boat and the issue was not widely contemplated by the local industry. U.S. Senator Dianne Feinstein called for an investigation into the incident and specifically asked to address the training of the crew and why they were not able to rescue or alert the passengers. She also wanted to see if additional regulations are needed to prevent similar tragedies in the future. Via press release, Feinstein stated "It's inconceivable that with all the safety regulations we have in place today, a fire on a boat can lead to the loss of life we saw this morning near Santa Cruz Island".

The National Transportation Safety Board (NTSB) launched a go team on September 3 to the accident to investigate. The on-scene portion of the investigation was scheduled to last for ten days, with the objective to determine the cause of the fire and verify the safety measures that had been aboard Conception. The Coast Guard launched its own safety investigation focused principally on regulation adherence and on determining if enforcement action was required. The NTSB and other authorities toured the Conception's sister ship Vision, also owned by Truth Aquatics, to evaluate how it might be evacuated in the event of a fire. During the tour of Vision, NTSB Member Jennifer Homendy was "taken aback" by the difficulty of using the aft escape hatch. "You have to climb up a ladder and across the top bunk and then push a wooden door up. It was a tight space." Speaking on September 3, Member Homendy said she was "one hundred percent confident that we will learn the why and the how" behind the accident.

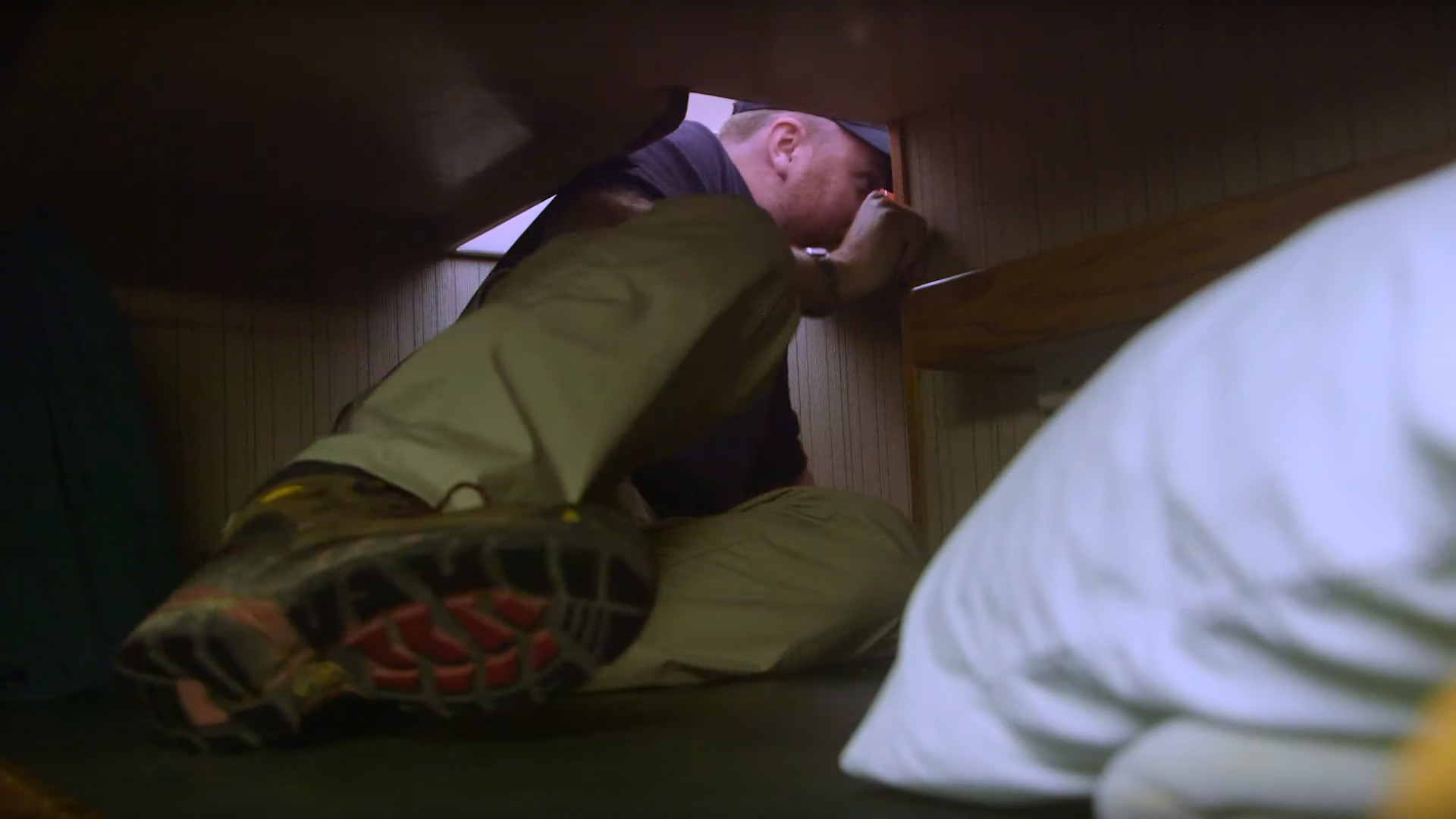
NTSB official using the aft (salon) escape hatch on sister dive boat Vision

Agents with the Bureau of Alcohol, Tobacco, Firearms and Explosives (ATF) immediately responded, but investigatory agents did not arrive until September 7, to investigate the point of ignition and cause of the blaze. Search warrants were served on September 8 for the Truth Aquatics offices and the two remaining boats in its fleet. On September 9, law enforcement sources told the Los Angeles Times that a joint federal criminal investigation was underway, led by the Coast Guard, joined by the FBI and ATF, and under the oversight of the United States Attorney for Los Angeles. The focus of the investigation is on records retrieved from the offices of Truth Aquatics, prompted by a preliminary investigation which indicated potential deficiencies in crew training, passenger safety briefings, and the failure to use a roaming "night watchman".

On September 11, the Coast Guard announced it would convene a formal Marine Board of Investigation (MBI) for the fire and loss of Conception. The four members of the MBI will determine contributing factors, including whether the actions of certified people or any Coast Guard or government personnel may have contributed to the loss. The Coast Guard named Captain Jason Neubauer as the chair of the MBI. However, the MBI had not been convened by October 2020.

The wreck was examined by government officials after it was retrieved and brought to Port Hueneme on September 13; the ATF examination concluded September 27, but no immediate cause of the fire was determined. Some parts of the boat have been removed and sent to laboratories for further examination.

=== Salvage ===
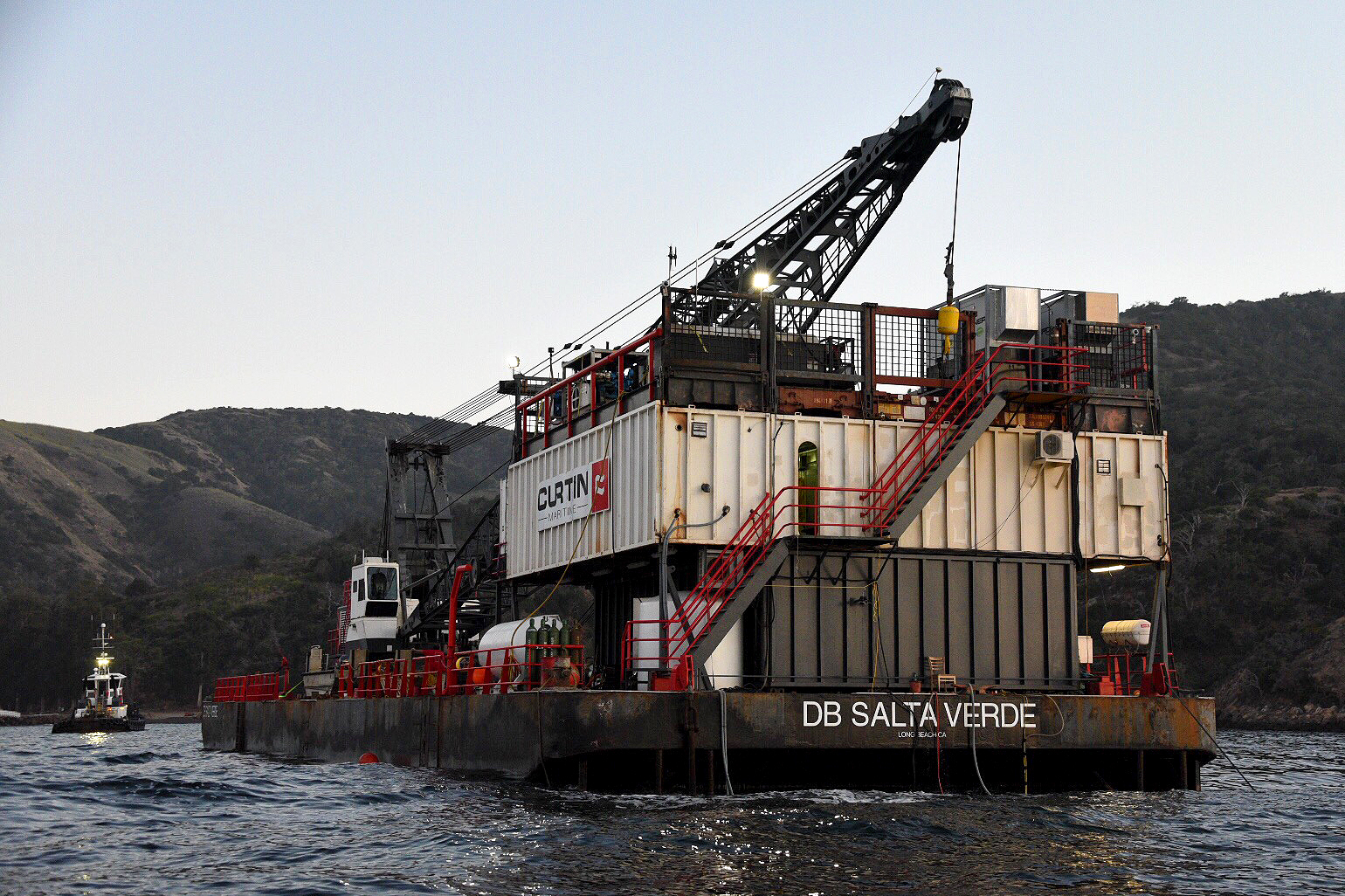
DB Salta Verde at Santa Cruz Island (September 2019)

Derrick barge Salta Verde (MMSI number: 367507960) arrived at Santa Cruz Island to assist with the salvage operation on September 4. Divers examined the wreckage to prepare to raise it, but high winds and heavy seas hampered the recovery plans. Conception had settled on the bottom upside-down; the first attempt to roll the boat upright and raise it was planned for September 6, but recovery efforts would be delayed if the windy conditions had continued. The FBI assisted this portion of the investigation due to their experience in evidence preservation. Side-scan sonar was used to image the boat in situ and video was taken of the undisturbed wreckage prior to lifting. Divers were required throughout the process to monitor the lift and look for the last victim.

Conception was rolled upright while underwater on September 6. Continued adverse weather conditions prevented the raising of the wreck until September 12. DB Salta Verde transported the boat to a secure location at Naval Base Ventura County through the Port of Hueneme on September 13. The wreck of Conception was inspected over the next thirteen days by the Coast Guard, Bureau of Alcohol, Tobacco, and Firearms, Federal Bureau of Investigation, and the Santa Barbara Fire Department. National Transportation Safety Board investigators were permitted to examine the wreck on September 24 and 25.

=== Cause ===
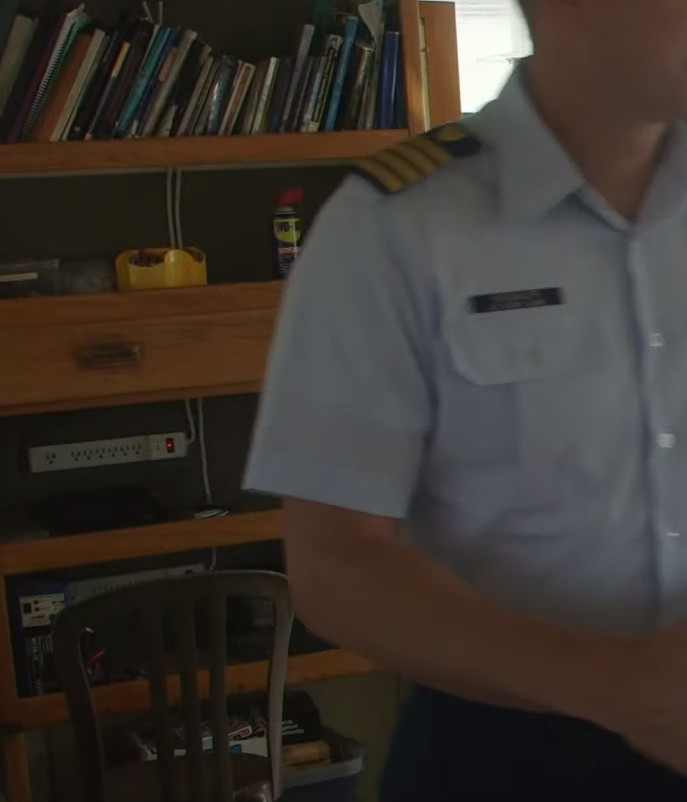
Aft wall of main deck cabin on sister dive boat Vision, showing bookcase and power strips for charging electronics

The NTSB expected to conclude its investigation and declare a cause after twelve to eighteen months of investigations. One of the surviving crew members theorized the fire may have started in the salon of the ship, where cellphones and cameras had been plugged in to charge overnight. The designer of the vessel speculated the fire may have begun in the bunk area, possibly sparked by a lithium battery. Boats made at the time the Conception was built were not installed with electrical systems that could handle the number of rechargeable devices carried by current passengers, who often bring cell phones, cameras, and lighting systems for their dives. The sheer number of devices charging at once may have overloaded circuits, or the devices' lithium-ion batteries may have overloaded. In October 2018, two passengers aboard the sister ship Vision saw a battery and charger catch on fire in the aft portion of the salon; one unplugged it and dunked it in a bin of rinse water, and the other emptied a fire extinguisher onto the aft bookcase where it had been plugged in.

The NTSB planned to take remnants of any devices charging in the boat to their headquarters near Washington, D.C. for further examination. On September 10, the Coast Guard issued Marine Safety Information Bulletin (MSIB) 008–19, immediately advising owners, operators, and masters of passenger vessels to limit "the unsupervised charging of lithium-ion batteries and extensive use of power strips and extension cords".

=== Areas of concern ===
While there were smoke detectors on the Conception, the surviving crew did not believe any alarms sounded before they discovered the fire. The detectors were of the standard type for home use, which, at the time both Conception and Vision were built, met existing safety requirements. MSIB 008-19 also advised that firefighting and lifesaving equipment should be checked immediately to ensure it is onboard and operational. According to the preliminary NTSB report, the two smoke alarms were locally-sounding (i.e., not connected to any wheelhouse alarms), located in the lower deck bunkroom.

According to the Los Angeles Times, the preliminary investigation identified the lack of a roaming night watch as a safety deficiency, in violation of the conditions in the vessel's Certificate of Inspection and 46 C.F.R. § 185.410. MSIB 008-19 advised owners, operators, and masters to review the vessel's Certificate of Inspection to ensure that crewmembers are aware of and understand any conditional requirements, including any crewmember obligations during an emergency. In addition, emergency escapes were to be clearly identified, verified functional, and free of obstructions.

=== Preliminary report ===
NTSB issued a preliminary report on the fire on September 12. While the cause of the fire had not yet been determined, the Board believed the fire had spread through the boat while all of the crew had been asleep, despite regulations requiring one crew member to be awake on night watch. A lawyer representing Truth Aquatics disputed this assertion, and stated that one crew member had checked on the galley area around 2:30 a.m. on September 2. Officials believed that all the deceased sleeping below decks had died from smoke inhalation before they were burned.

=== Findings and public hearing ===
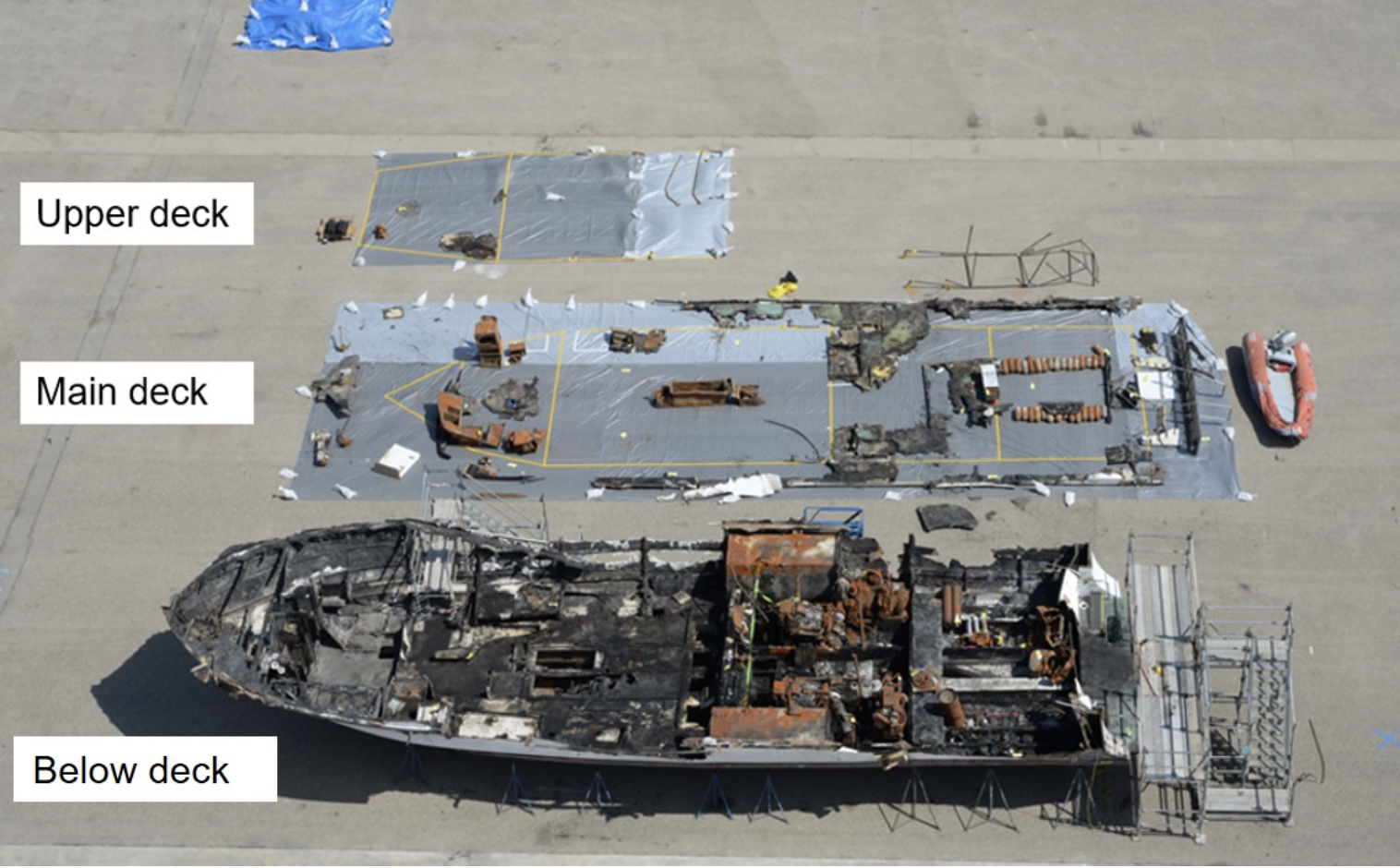
Wreckage from the vessel arranged by deck

On August 31, 2020, the NTSB advised families that it had substantially completed its investigation, and would publish evidence and interviews before a public hearing and a vote on findings in October. The NTSB released findings from its report on the incident on October 20, 2020. The report stated that the deaths may have been prevented if the boat had a roving watchman, as required by regulations. Investigators found several bodies wearing shoes, and believed that some of the victims may have been awake and trying to escape before being overcome by smoke. In the final report, the NTSB concluded "most of the victims were awake but could not escape the bunkroom before all were overcome by smoke inhalation", based on their state of dress and evidence demonstrating that several had left their bunks and had gathered belongings for escape.

Although the NTSB was not able to determine the definitive cause of the fire, the likely origin point was in the aft part of the salon, and the most likely sources included the electrical distribution system, unattended battery charging, or improperly discarded smoking materials. Member Homendy added "Some people may walk away and say, 'Well, I wish I knew what the ignition source was.' But the key here is that the focus should be on conditions were present that allowed the fire to go undetected and to grow to a point where it prevented the evacuation."

Because of the pending criminal investigation of the fatal fire, the NTSB was requested to not interview the ship's captain, the first galley hand, or any Truth Aquatics employee responsible for operations. Company records were seized during a search of the company's offices and two remaining vessels that occurred from September 8 to 10, 2019; the NTSB was not granted access to any of the seized information until February 2020.

=== Probable cause ===
The NTSB concluded "the probable cause of the accident on board the small passenger vessel Conception was the failure of Truth Aquatics, Inc., to provide effective oversight of its vessel and crewmember operations, including requirements to ensure that a roving patrol was maintained, which allowed a fire of unknown cause to grow, undetected, in the vicinity of the aft salon on the main deck." Member Homendy stated "I hate the term accident in this case because, in my opinion, it is not an accident if you fail to operate your company safely", and NTSB Chairman Robert Sumwalt admonished Truth Aquatics to "clean up your act." In the report synopsis, the NTSB also concluded "Truth Aquatics had been deviating from required safe practices for some time" and added that "Truth Aquatics provided ineffective safety oversight of its vessels' operations", based on observations of existing unsafe practices, including the lack of a roving patrol, failure to train the crew, and failure to hold emergency drills. The Coast Guard issued MSIB 03–20 on February 6, 2020, recommending that small passenger vessel owners and operators voluntarily establish a safety management system to identify and mitigate potential hazards. A spokesman for the Coast Guard stated the agency had embarked on a concentrated inspection campaign for every small passenger vessel with overnight accommodations shortly after the preliminary results had been determined.

Because the required Coast Guard vessel inspection occurs in port, without passengers embarked, there is no way to verify compliance with the night patrol requirement. The Coast Guard has not cited any owner, operator, or charterer with a violation or fine for failing to post a roving patrol since 1991, demonstrating the agency's failure to enforce the requirement. Chairman Sumwalt stated "The Conception may have passed all Coast Guard inspections, but that did not make it safe" while explaining the NTSB's recommended changes to existing inspection programs and vessel regulations. The NTSB has no regulatory enforcement ability and relies on other agencies to implement the recommendations from its investigations. Sumwalt added "This tragedy did not need to happen. We hope that our actions from today will prevent such disaster in the future."

Truth Aquatics was also faulted for "deviating from required safe practices for some time" prior to the accident, despite their reputation for operating, according to a former captain of the sister boat Vision, "the safest boats on the coast". Uncredentialed deckhands were allowed to direct movement of the vessel, contradicting Subchapter T regulations. New crewmembers were not required to read and understand emergency procedures prior to getting underway. Fire drills were not held regularly. Passenger briefings were not conducted as soon as possible after leaving port. Collectively, the NTSB called it "a habitual disregard for rules, policies, and procedures" and the resulting normalization of deviance could have been discovered earlier if Truth Aquatics "had been actively engaged in ensuring the safe practices required by regulations were being followed".

=== Contributing causes ===
In addition, the contributing causes were determined to be the inadequate regulation of smoke detection in all accommodation spaces, and inadequate emergency escape arrangements. Existing regulations only required modular smoke detector(s) in overnight accommodation spaces; because the fire likely started in the salon, away from the passenger berths and the galley area, the fire was already well-developed by the time the smoke and heat detectors could alarm. If the smoke detectors were deployed in all passenger spaces, not just their sleeping berths, and were interconnected so that all would alarm when any one detected smoke, that would have increased the chance the fire could have been detected early enough to allow for effective firefighting and evacuation.

The inadequacy of escape arrangements was also highlighted. Bunks immediately underneath the secondary exit hatch were cited as an obstacle. NTSB Member Michael E. Graham stated "I don't see how an average human with a life jacket on could get up through that hatch ... without being a contortionist." The NTSB reported "the [secondary hatch] escape path would have been challenging for anyone to navigate without practice and would have been further complicated by low lighting and poor visibility due to smoke from the fire." Also, both the primary stairway and secondary hatch exits led to the salon, which was already engulfed in fire, blocking egress for everyone below the main deck. In the final investigation report, the NTSB concluded "if regulations had required the escape hatch to exit to a space other than the salon, optimally directly to the weather deck, the passengers and crewmember in the bunkroom would have likely been able to escape."

=== ATF investigation ===
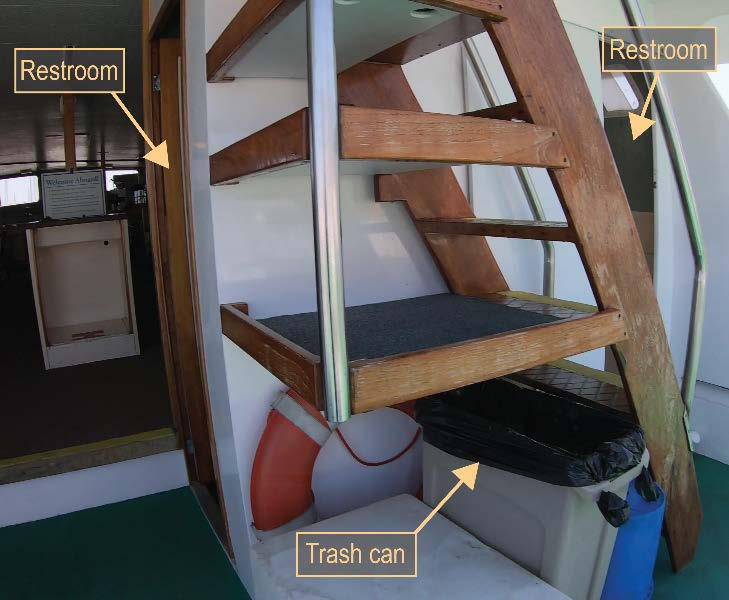
Stairway of the MV Conception with a combustible Rubbermaid Slim Jim polyethylene trash can in 2019.

A confidential ATF report authored in January 2021, and reported in September 2023, concluded that the fire began in a plastic trash can below the stairs leading up to the main deck, which blocked the escape route of passengers from the bottom deck. The ATF's investigation used burn tests simulated on a full-scale recreation of the vessel's main deck, and found that the flames would have blocked all escape routes soon after ignition, and any winds blowing would have spread the fire even more quickly. Contrary to the NTSB's investigation, the ATF found that there was no evidence to support that the fire originated from a power strip where passenger's batteries were charging.

== Legal action ==
Truth Aquatics filed a lawsuit on September 5, 2019, in the United States District Court for the Central District of California, seeking to limit its liability under the Limitation of Liability Act of 1851. This was an apparent attempt to limit its liability for monetary damages to the value of the ship. Under the terms of the lawsuit, the ship valuation was assessed after it sank; because the insurer had deemed it a total wreck, the value was US$0.

The first lawsuit against Truth Aquatics was filed one week later on September 12, by one of the surviving crew members from Conception. The civil lawsuit, filed in Ventura County Superior Court against Truth Aquatics and Worldwide Diving Adventures, claimed the crew had not received proper training nor was the boat outfitted with appropriate emergency equipment.

A counterclaim against the original limitation of liability suit was filed in November 2019 by the spouse of a passenger who died aboard Conception, seeking funeral expenses and wrongful death, survival, and punitive damages. In January 2020, attorneys representing the families of four victims also responded to the original suit with wrongful death claims, claiming "The defendants killed these victims by breaking the law and failing to have a roving night watch whose job was to prevent the very catastrophe that occurred." By December 2020, 32 of the victims' families had filed claims against Truth Aquatics. As of 9 December 2020, Truth Aquatics had sold its two remaining liveaboard dive vessels. Truth Aquatics agreed to pause their earlier suit to limit liability until the lawsuits filed by the families of the victims are resolved.

A criminal investigation against the captain was carried out in summer 2020. In December 2020, the United States Attorney's office for the Central District of California announced the captain of the Conception had been indicted by a federal grand jury for 34 counts of seaman's manslaughter; the text of the indictment stated that the captain was responsible for the disaster "by his misconduct, negligence, and inattention to his duties". He pleaded not guilty to the charges in February 2021. In August 2022, the judge dismissed his indictment as defective without prejudice because prosecutors used negligence instead of gross negligence in their presentation to the grand jury. A new indictment was issued on October 18, 2022. On November 6, 2023, the captain, Jerry Nehl Boylan, was found guilty of one count of misconduct or neglect of ship officer, colloquially known as "seaman’s manslaughter". Boylan was freed on $75,000 bond before being sentenced on May 2, 2024, to four years in prison followed by three years of supervised release for his criminal negligence.

The families of the victims filed a federal lawsuit against the Coast Guard in September 2021, alleging that its failure to enforce regulations led to the fire and deaths.

== Aftermath ==
California Governor Gavin Newsom issued a statement through Twitter praising the efforts of the emergency medical workers and offering his condolences to the families and loved ones affected.

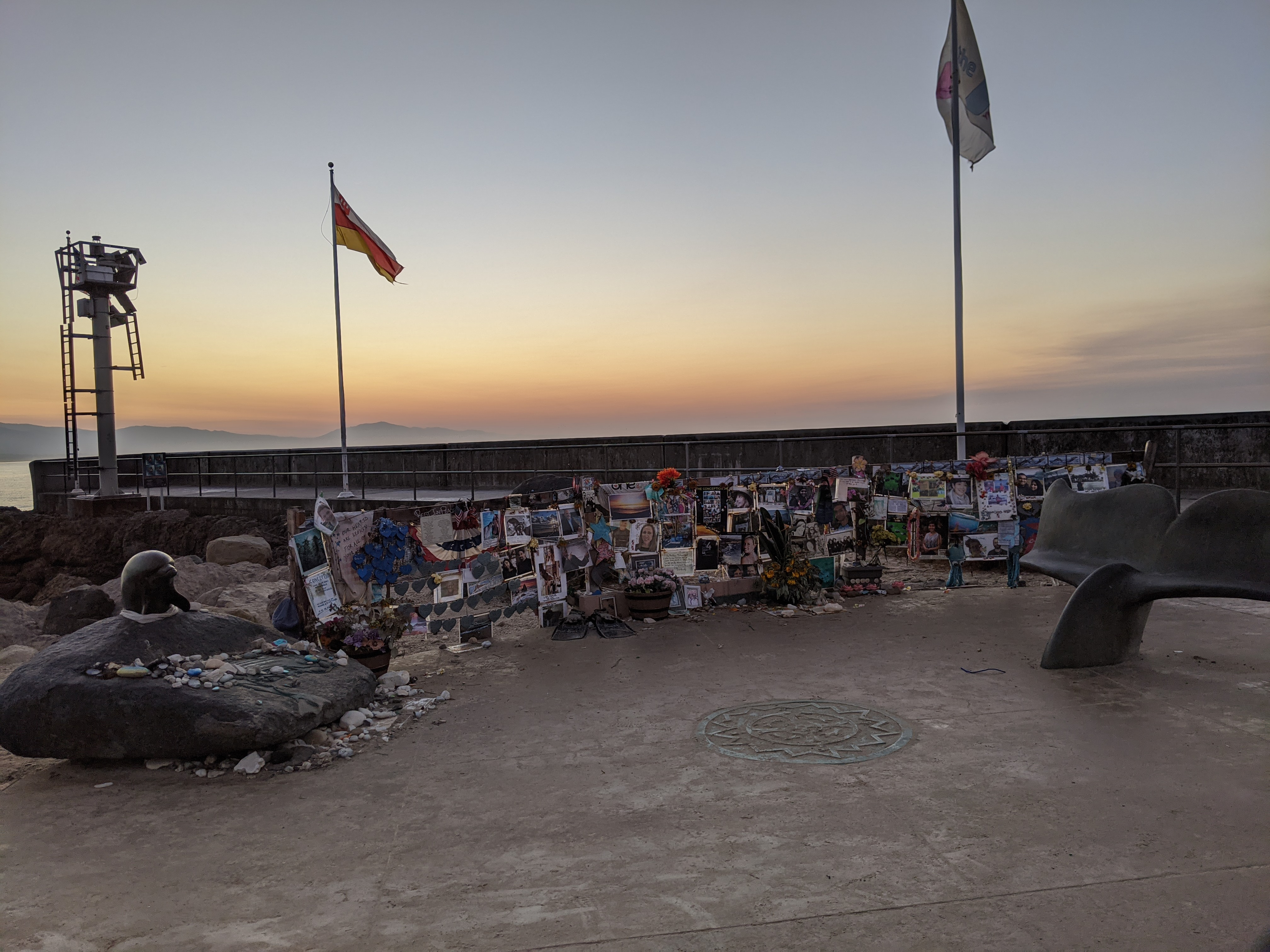
Conception and "Lost at Sea" memorials, Santa Barbara Harbor breakwater (2020)

A makeshift memorial was created outside Sea Landing, the headquarters of Truth Aquatics in Santa Barbara Harbor. A vigil was scheduled for September 6 with first responders taking part in the open-to-all event, which was organised by local religious groups, divers, and other organisations. The memorial was moved from Sea Landing to the end of the harbor breakwater in November 2019, adjacent to the existing "Lost at Sea" memorial, sculpted by Bud Bottoms and dedicated in June 2005. A permanent memorial for the victims of the Conception fire was dedicated at the site on September 2, 2020, the first anniversary of the disaster; the list of victims was written on a plaque and affixed to a boulder in Platts Cove. Another memorial is being designed for a planned California Islands museum in Carpinteria, incorporating one of the propellers from Conception.

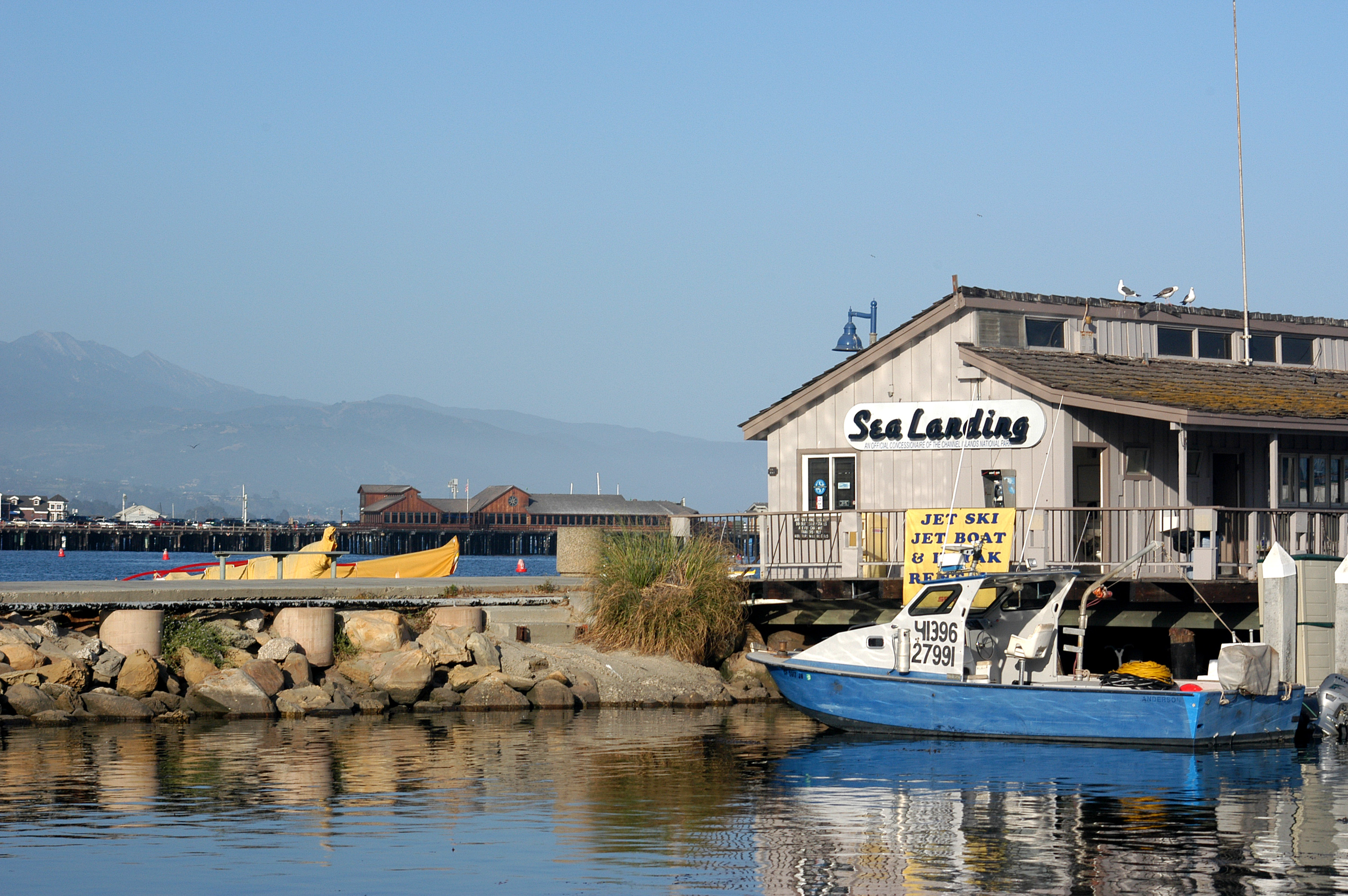
The Truth Aquatics offices were in Sea Landing at the Santa Barbara Harbor

Truth Aquatics suspended operations on their remaining two boats following the disaster. The voluntary suspension was made indefinite in October 2019.

In June 2020, the Coast Guard awarded the Meritorious Public Service Award, one of its highest civilian honors, to Paul Amaral, captain of the TowBoat US vessel that towed the still-burning Conception into deeper waters.

== Legacy ==
The United States House of Representatives Subcommittee on Coast Guard and Maritime Transportation held a hearing on November 14, 2019, to discuss commercial and passenger vessel safety. Brian Curtis, the director of the NTSB's Office of Marine Safety, testified before the Subcommittee, reiterating the investigation into the sinking of Conception was still in progress and that it would focus on the wreck itself as well as other factors such as current regulations, fire alarm and warning systems, evacuation routes, training and company policies and procedures. Members of the Subcommittee asked the Coast Guard representative, Rear Admiral Richard Timme, what actions the Coast Guard was taking after the Los Angeles Times published an investigative story on November 12 stating the Coast Guard had often failed to implement safety recommendations from the NTSB. In response, Timme vowed the Coast Guard would "wholly fulfill our regulatory oversight role to keep the maritime public safe" and would adopt new regulations immediately after they are published by an internal task force developing inspection rules for vessels similar to Conception.

In December 2019, Rep. Salud Carbajal, whose district includes Santa Barbara, Rep. Julia Brownley and Sen. Dianne Feinstein introduced the Small Passenger Vessel Safety Act of 2019 to mandate some of the recommended changes. The bills have been incorporated into the National Defense Authorization Act for Fiscal Year 2021. The families of the victims have continued to advocate for legislation to implement the NTSB recommendations for improvements in fire and safety training and additional monitoring devices.

In its 2020 report, the NTSB recommended the Coast Guard make revisions to Title 46 Code of Federal Regulations Subchapter T, governing small passenger vessels. Recommended changes included stricter requirements for interconnected smoke detectors comprehensively deployed in all passenger accommodation spaces, development of an inspection procedure to verify that roving patrols are implemented and secondary escape paths that provide an alternate exit point. Another key recommendation was to establish regulations to require marine vessel operators to implement a safety management system; this was a repeated recommendation that had been made previously after two accidents involving MV Andrew J. Barberi in 2003 and 2010.

As part of the National Defense Authorization Act, Congress directed the Coast Guard in December 2020 to review its fire safety regulations for small vessels that accommodated passengers overnight.

In February 2021, Vice Admiral Scott Buschman of the Coast Guard announced his concurrence with the NTSB recommendations. A "concentrated [Coast Guard] inspection campaign" of vessels with overnight accommodations was undertaken after the fatal fire aboard Conception and the results of that campaign, said Buschman, will be used to update the inspection program.

In December 2021, the Coast Guard issued interim rules implementing many of the safety recommendations from the NTSB's investigation report. These rules were criticized by victims' families for not creating a requirement for safety management systems on small passenger vessels, and a 2023 letter sent by NTSB Chair Jennifer Homendy to the Coast Guard Commandant reiterated the need for a safety management system requirement. Findings from the investigations related to combustible trash receptacles were incorporated into a June 2023 Coast Guard marine safety alert on risk factors in small passenger vessel fires.

== See also ==
- List of maritime disasters in the 21st century
- List of shipwrecks in 2019
- List of transportation fires
