= USCGC Narwhal =

United States Coast Guard patrol boat

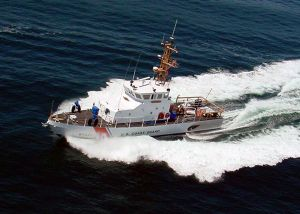
- Narwhal under way

History

United States
- Name: Narwhal
- Namesake: Narwhal
- Operator: United States Coast Guard
- Builder: Bollinger Shipyards, Lockport, Louisiana
- Home port: Corona del Mar, California
- Identification: Hull number: WPB-87335
- Honors and awards: Meritorious Unit Commendation (2017–2020)
- Status: In active service

General characteristics
- Class & type: Marine Protector-class patrol boat
- Length: 87 ft (27 m)

USCGC Narwhal (WPB-87335) is an 87-foot (27 m) Marine Protector-class patrol boat of the United States Coast Guard. It has been based at Corona del Mar in Newport Beach, California, since 2001. Its missions include search and rescue, drug interdiction, migrant interdiction and the enforcement of fisheries laws off Southern California. In September 2019 Narwhal was the first Coast Guard cutter on scene at the fire aboard the dive boat Conception off Santa Cruz Island, in which 34 people died. The cutter is sponsored by the Newport Beach Council of the Navy League of the United States.

== Design ==
Narwhal is one of the Marine Protector-class coastal patrol boats built for the Coast Guard by Bollinger Shipyards of Lockport, Louisiana, under a contract first awarded on March 13, 1996. The class replaced the older 82-foot Point-class cutters.

== Service history ==
Narwhal arrived at Corona del Mar in 2001. The cutter's crew has hosted public tours in Newport Harbor. It has also visited the Ocean Institute in Dana Point for public tours.

=== Conception fire ===
At about 3:15 a.m. on September 2, 2019, Coast Guard Sector Los Angeles-Long Beach received a mayday from the 75-foot (23 m) dive boat Conception, which was on fire near Santa Cruz Island. The sector sent helicopters from Point Mugu and San Diego along with Narwhal, which had been on routine patrol nearby. Narwhal was the first Coast Guard cutter to arrive and crews began setting up pumps to remove water from the burning boat, hoping to keep it stable enough to tow ashore, but Conception sank before the equipment was ready. Five crew members escaped, but all 34 people below deck died. The Coast Guard suspended its search for survivors after about 23 hours and some 160 square miles (410 km^{2}) searched.

Narwhal later received the Coast Guard Meritorious Unit Commendation for its service from July 2017 to February 2020. This citation specifically noted its swift response to the Conception fire.

=== Migrant interdictions ===
In the 2020s Narwhal carried out a series of interdictions of migrant boats off Orange and San Diego counties:

- In November 2024 its crew stopped a 34-foot (10 m) boat carrying 21 migrants about 1 mile (1.6 km) west of Newport Beach. The migrants were transferred to U.S. Customs and Border Protection.
- On April 6, 2025, it interdicted 22 people aboard a 45-foot (14 m) cabin cruiser about 6 miles (9.7 km) west of Point Loma.
- On April 9, 2026, a Narwhal boarding team interdicted three people about 5 miles (8.0 km) off Point Loma.
- At about 12:54 a.m. on July 20, 2026, a boarding team stopped an 18-foot (5.5 m) Sea Ray about 7 miles (11 km) off Point Loma with seven people aboard. They were taken to Ballast Point and handed over to the United States Border Patrol.

== See also ==
- List of United States Coast Guard cutters
