= MV Lintas Timur =

Indonesian cargo ship

History

Indonesia
- Name: Lintas Timur
- Completed: 1997
- Homeport: Jakarta
- Identification: IMO number: 8740618; MMSI number: 525642751; Callsign: PMCN
- Fate: Sank on 1 June 2019

General characteristics
- Type: General cargo
- Tonnage: 1,720 GT
- Length: 80 m (262 ft 6 in)
- Beam: 11 m (36 ft 1 in)
- Speed: 7.4 knots (13.7 km/h; 8.5 mph)
- Crew: 18

MV Lintas Timur was an Indonesian cargo ship which sank off the eastern coast of Sulawesi on 1 June 2019. The sinking of the vessel caused all but one of the ship's eighteen crew to be lost at sea.

== Vessel ==
Lintas Timur was a general cargo ship, with a length of 80 m (262 ft 6 in) and beam of 11 m (36 ft 1 in), and was built on 1997. It had an average speed of 5.5 knots (10.2 km/h; 6.3 mph) and a top speed of 7.4 knots (13.7 km/h; 8.5 mph), with a capacity of 1,720 GT.

== Sinking ==
On 28 May 2019, Lintas Timur departed the port of Bitung in North Sulawesi, bound for the industrial park at Morowali with a cargo of 3,000 sacks of cement. Around midday of 1 June, the vessel was slightly tilting to one side, and by 16:00 local time the ship was taking in water. The ship's captain then ordered all 18 hands on board to abandon ship and they jumped into the sea wearing life jackets. Several of the survivors attempted to swim towards land, but they were separated and only one was rescued by a passing Indian vessel NV Nurbayaksar off the Banggai Islands Regency. The survivor had been floating in the sea for three days, and stated that he witnessed three other crewmembers drowning after the incident.

Following a search and rescue operation, the body of one crew member was discovered by local fisherman on 8 June. The operation was called off on 10 June, with the remaining 16 crew members still missing.
