= List of storms named Wipha =

The name Wipha (Thai: วิภา, pronounced [wí(ʔ).pʰāː]) has been used for five tropical cyclones in the western North Pacific Ocean. This name was originally spelled Vipa by the WMO before an orthographic update in 2002. The name was contributed by Thailand and is a feminine given name meaning "luster" or "brilliance" in Thai.

- Typhoon Vipa (2001) (T0117, 21W) – minimal typhoon that remained at sea.
- Typhoon Wipha (2007) (T0712, 13W, Goring) – Category 4 super typhoon that struck China.
- Typhoon Wipha (2013) (T1326, 25W, Tino) – Category 4 typhoon that affected Japan.
- Tropical Storm Wipha (2019) (T1907, 08W) – caused significant damages in Vietnam and China.
- Severe Tropical Storm Wipha (2025) (T2506, 09W, Crising) – Category 1 typhoon that impacted the Philippines, China, and Indochina.

The name Wipha was retired following the 2025 Pacific typhoon season and a replacement name will be given at the 59th WMO/Typhoon Committee Annual Session in spring 2027.
