= 2019 Kerch Strait liquified gas tanker fire =

Maritime incident in the Kerch Strait

Incident
- Date: 21 January 2019
- Summary: Ships caught fire while transferring liquefied gas from one vessel to another
- Site: Kerch Strait
- Crew: 32
- Fatalities: 14
- Missing: 6
- Survivors: 12

The 2019 Kerch Strait liquified gas tanker fire was a major incident that occurred on 21 January 2019 when two ships, Kandy and Maestro, caught fire while transferring liquefied gas from one vessel to another in the Kerch Strait. The incident subsequently killed fourteen crewmembers and six went missing, including Libyan, Turkish, and Indian sailors, while twelve sailors jumped into the water and were rescued by the Russian Navy. Kandy was carrying a crew of seventeen, while Maestro was crewed by a complement of fifteen. At the time of the incident, both ships were carrying 4,500 tonnes of fuel. The ship-to-ship fuel transfer resulted a fire explosion and spread across both ships; Tanzanian-flagged Turkish ships' Maestro and Kandy. (Note: The vessel Kandy is also known as Candy or Venice.) The blaze lasted more than four days.

Project MPSV07 salvage ship Spasatel Demidov led the fire-fighting effort but despite dowsing both ships, the fire continued to rage for five more days. The crew rescue operation was conducted by ten ships, including a Russian rescue vessel.

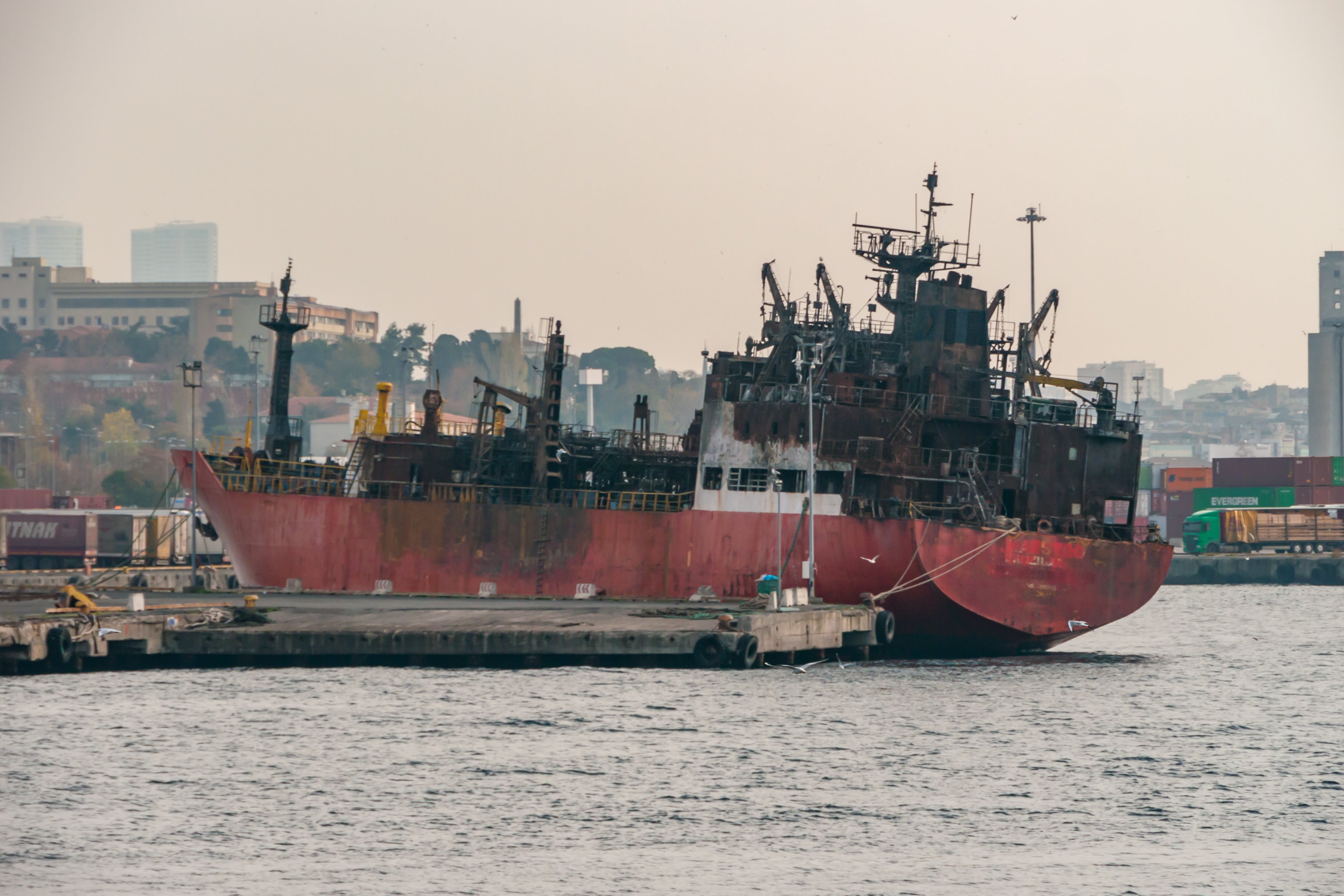
Wreck of the Maestro moored in Istanbul in late 2019

== Background ==
Following the United States trade policy, the Russian oil company Maktren-Nafta denied access of the gas-carrier tanker Maestro to the liquefied gas terminal at Temryuk, as Maestro was listed on a United States sanctions for transporting fuel to Syria. Unable to upload liquefied gas at Temryuk port, Maestro was illegally loaded by ship-to-ship transfer from Kandy.

Maestro and Kandy caught fire in the Kerch Strait, separating the Sea of Azov from the Black Sea. Both cargo ships, old and in poor condition, were believed to be actively involved in illegal trade, reportedly carrying out ship-to-ship cargo operations within jurisdictions affected by the U.S. trade ban, carrying crude oil from Iran to Syria. It was further noted that on 21 January Kandy had loaded 30,000 barrels of liquefied petroleum gas from Temryukskiy port, with her destination declared as Lebanon, but with no satellite tracking device aboard.
