= MV Nusa Kenari 02 =

MV Nusa Kenari 02 was an Indonesian passenger boat which sank off Alor on 15 June 2019. At least three people was killed due to the sinking, with four further missing out of the 52 passengers and crew aboard the vessel.

== Characteristics ==
The vessel, which had a 30-ton capacity, belonged to the Alor Regency local government, and was donated to the regency by the Ministry of Villages, Disadvantaged Regions and Transmigration in 2013, though its operation and maintenance was the responsibility of a local public organization.

== Sinking ==
Around 1:30 a.m. local time on 15 June, Nusa Kenari 02 departed the port of Kalabahi - Alor's main town - bound for the village of Pureman in the other side of the island. The vessel carried 52 passengers and 4 crew, in addition to cargo which included several tons of rice and 100 bags of cement weighing 40 kg (88 lb) each.

Nusa Kenari 02 capsized some 200 metres (220 yd) off the shores of Tanjung Margeta, on the southwestern side of the island. The vessel's water pump had failed, causing the vessel to take on water, forcing the skipper to move the boat closer to shore. In the process, a large wave struck the starboard side of the vessel, causing it to lean on one side and breaking off the upper deck. After this, many of the passengers abandoned the vessel and swam to safety. Due to the short distance from the shores, most passengers were able to swim to safety. Local police statements by the following day indicated that three people had been confirmed killed and another four were still missing, with 49 survivors.

It was later found that Nusa Kenari 02 had set sail without permission from the port authority of Alor. In the search for the missing passengers, 29 search and rescue personnel from Alor, Kupang and Maumere were deployed, in addition to local police, officials, and residents.
