= 2008 Iran–United States naval dispute =

Naval dispute

Location	Strait of Hormuz
Result	Resolved peacefully

Belligerents
United States	Iran

Units involved
United States Navy	Navy of the Islamic Revolutionary Guard Corps; Border Guard Command

Strength
3 warships	5 patrol boats

The 2008 Iran–United States naval dispute refers to a series of naval stand-offs between Iranian speedboats and U.S. Navy warships in the Strait of Hormuz in December 2007 and January 2008.

== Incident ==
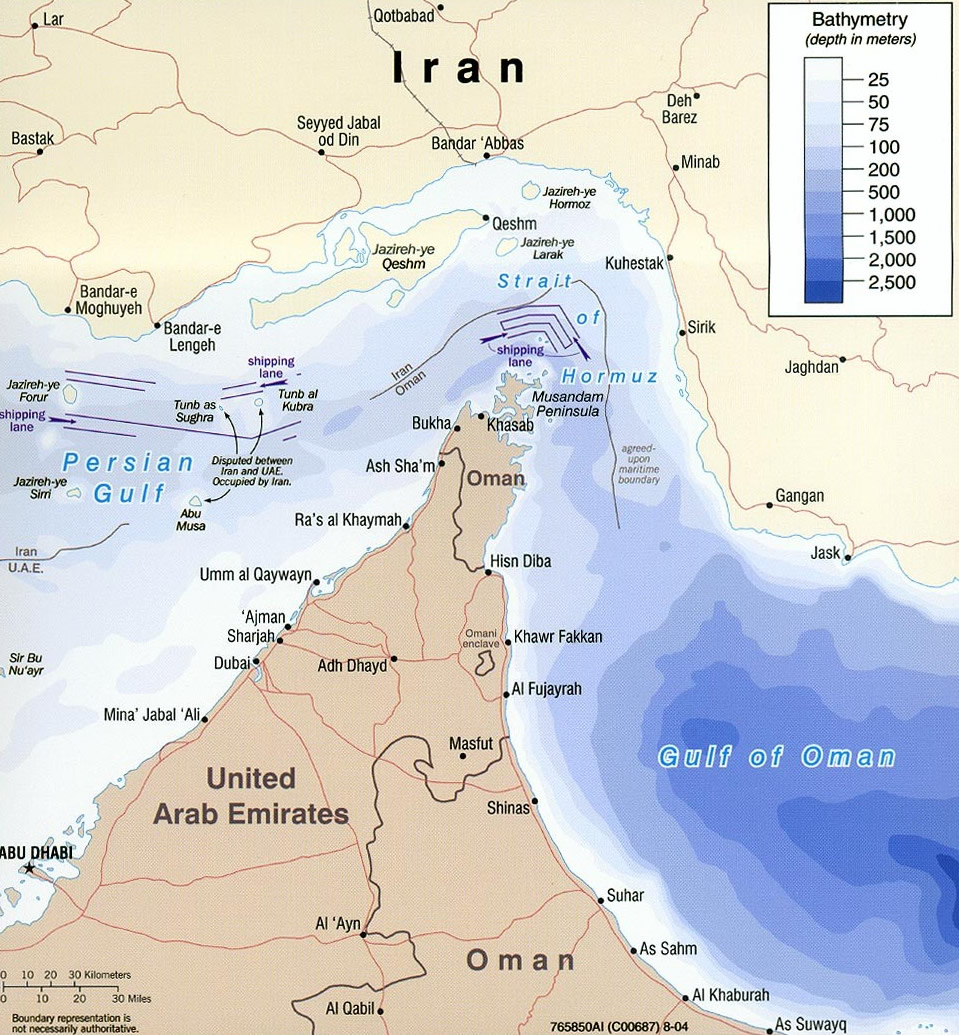
Map of Strait of Hormuz with maritime political boundaries

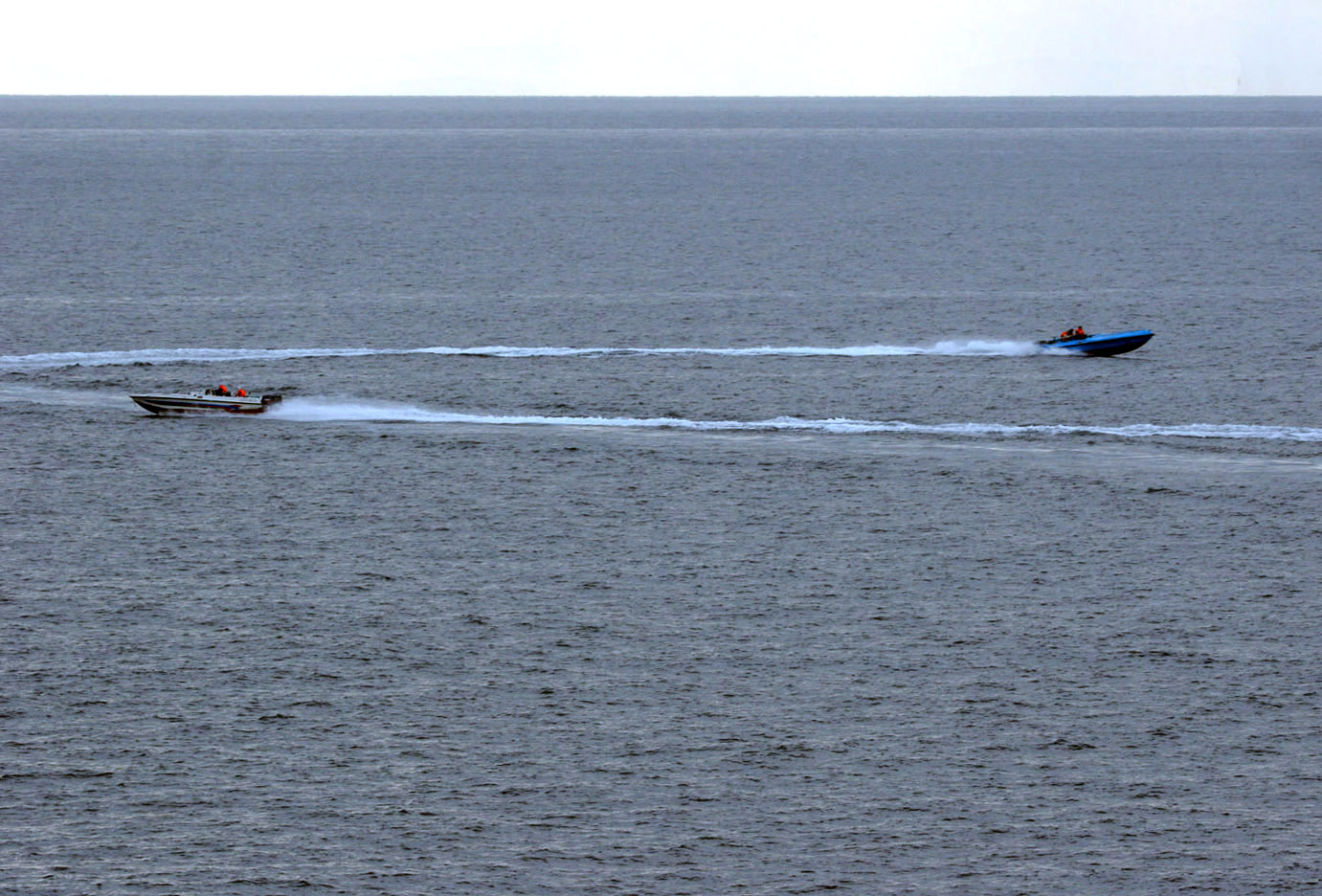
6 January 2008: Iranian speedboats maneuver near U.S. Navy ships

On 6 January 2008, five Iranian patrol boats crewed by the Revolutionary Guard approached three United States Navy warships in the Strait of Hormuz: the cruiser USS Port Royal, the destroyer USS Hopper and the frigate USS Ingraham. In a compilation of video and audio released by the Pentagon of the most provocative moments of the encounter, the radio officer of USS Hopper is seen and heard attempting to make radio contact with the Iranian vessels. A few moments later, another voice radioed Hopper saying, "I am coming at you. You will explode [in or after] [static] minutes."

Early United States reports indicated that because the Iranian boats continued to circle the United States warships and had been seen to drop several packages into the water, the United States ships had no choice but to take the threats seriously and maintain a defensive posture. Pentagon officials said the American ships were about to open fire when the Iranian boats withdrew. The commander of Hopper publicly denied that the American ships were about to open fire.

United States officials said the Iranians "harassed and provoked" their naval vessels, coming within 200 yards (180 m) of one warship. Iranian officials responded by calling the incident a routine contact of a sort that happens all the time in the crowded waters of the Persian Gulf. In response, on 8 January 2008 the U.S. Department of Defense released an abridged four-minute video segment of the audio and video recordings of the incident that included the radio threat. An Iranian Revolutionary Guard source stated, "The footage released by the US Navy are file pictures and the audio has been fabricated." On 10 January 2008, Iran accused the United States of creating a "media fuss". The Iranian Press TV then released its abridged video of the incident, where no threats can be heard. The United States later released a 36-minute video of the incident.

There has been confusion as to the source of the threatening radio transmissions. Persian speakers and Iranians have told The Washington Post that the accent in the American recording does not sound Iranian. The New York Times pointed out that the United States-released audio includes no ambient noise of the kind that might be expected if the broadcast had come from one of the speedboats. The Navy Times wrote that the incident could have been caused by a locally famous heckler known as the "Filipino Monkey", noting that the threatening voice sounds different from that of the Iranian officer. Several media outlets reported that the Navy spliced the audio recording of the alleged Iranian threat onto to a videotape of the incident.

The Pentagon spokesman who described the Iranian boats as "highly maneuverable patrol craft" that was "visibly armed" did not note that such boats usually only carry a two- or three-man crew and that they are normally armed only with machine guns. The only boat that was close enough to be visible to the United States ships was unarmed, as an enlarged photo of the boat from the navy video shows.

On 12 January 2008, it was revealed that, contrary to previous reports, the packages the Iranian boats had dropped into the water posed no threat to the United States vessels. The leading United States vessels observed that they were harmless light floating objects and did not report them to follow United States vessels as a danger.

On 12 January 2008, two earlier incidents during December 2007 were revealed by United States Navy officials, one in which USS Whidbey Island fired warning shots in response to a small Iranian boat that was approaching it on 19 December. The Iranian boat reportedly then retreated after the shots were fired.

In an 8 July speech to the Revolutionary Guards, Ali Shirazi, a mid-level clerical aide to Iran's Supreme Leader Ali Khamenei, "The Zionist regime is pressuring White House officials to attack Iran. If they commit such a stupidity, Tel Aviv and U.S. shipping in the Persian Gulf will be Iran's first targets and they will be burned," according to the student news agency ISNA.

== Historical context ==
The presence of United States warships in the strait has been a sensitive issue for Iran since 3 July 1988, when the U.S. Navy cruiser USS Vincennes shot down an Iranian commercial flight in Iranian airspace over the strait, killing 290 civilians, an incident for which the United States never apologized, though it did provide monetary compensation.

== Territorial context ==
To travel through the Strait of Hormuz, which at its narrowest is 21 nautical miles (39 km) wide, ships pass through the territorial waters of Iran and Oman under the transit passage provisions of the United Nations Convention on the Law of the Sea. Neither Iran or the United States have ratified the convention, but the United States accepts the traditional navigation rules as reflected in the convention. Iran has stated that it reserves "the right to require prior authorization for warships to exercise the right of innocent passage through its territorial sea." It is unclear if the incident happened in the territorial waters of Iran or Oman.

== See also ==
- 2007 Iranian arrest of Royal Navy personnel
- USS Typhoon encounter with Iranian Craft (11 April 2008)
- 2011–12 Strait of Hormuz dispute
- Millennium Challenge 2002
- Filipino Monkey
- 2016 U.S.–Iran naval incident
- Iran–United States relations during the G.W. Bush administration
