= Iran–United States relations during the second Trump administration =

Iran–United States relations during the second Trump administration relations

- Iran: United States

Diplomatic mission
- Interests Section in the Pakistani Embassy, Washington, D.C.: Interests Section in the Swiss Embassy, Tehran

Envoy
- Director of the Interest Section Mehdi Atefat: United States Special Representative for Iran Abram Paley

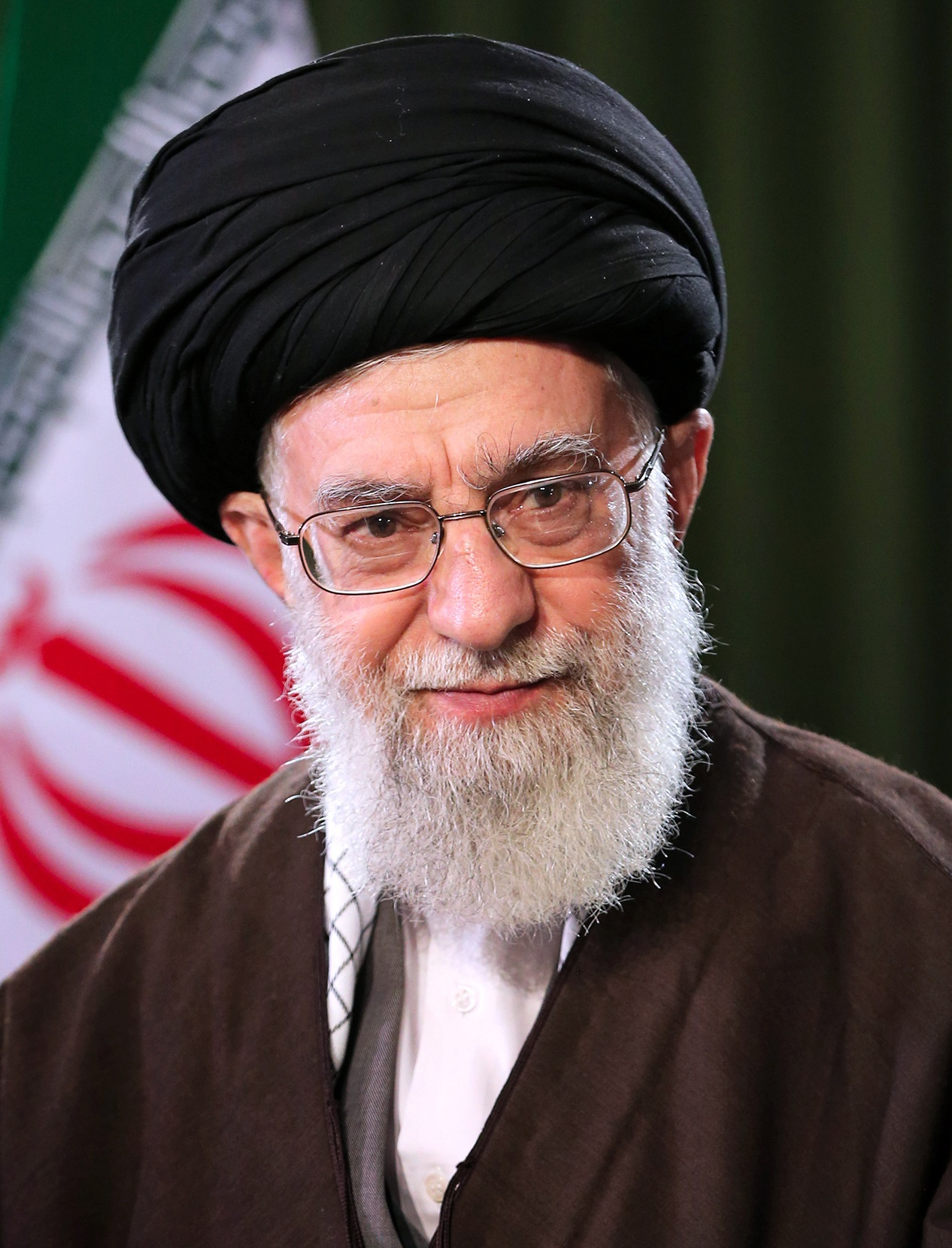
Ali Khamenei

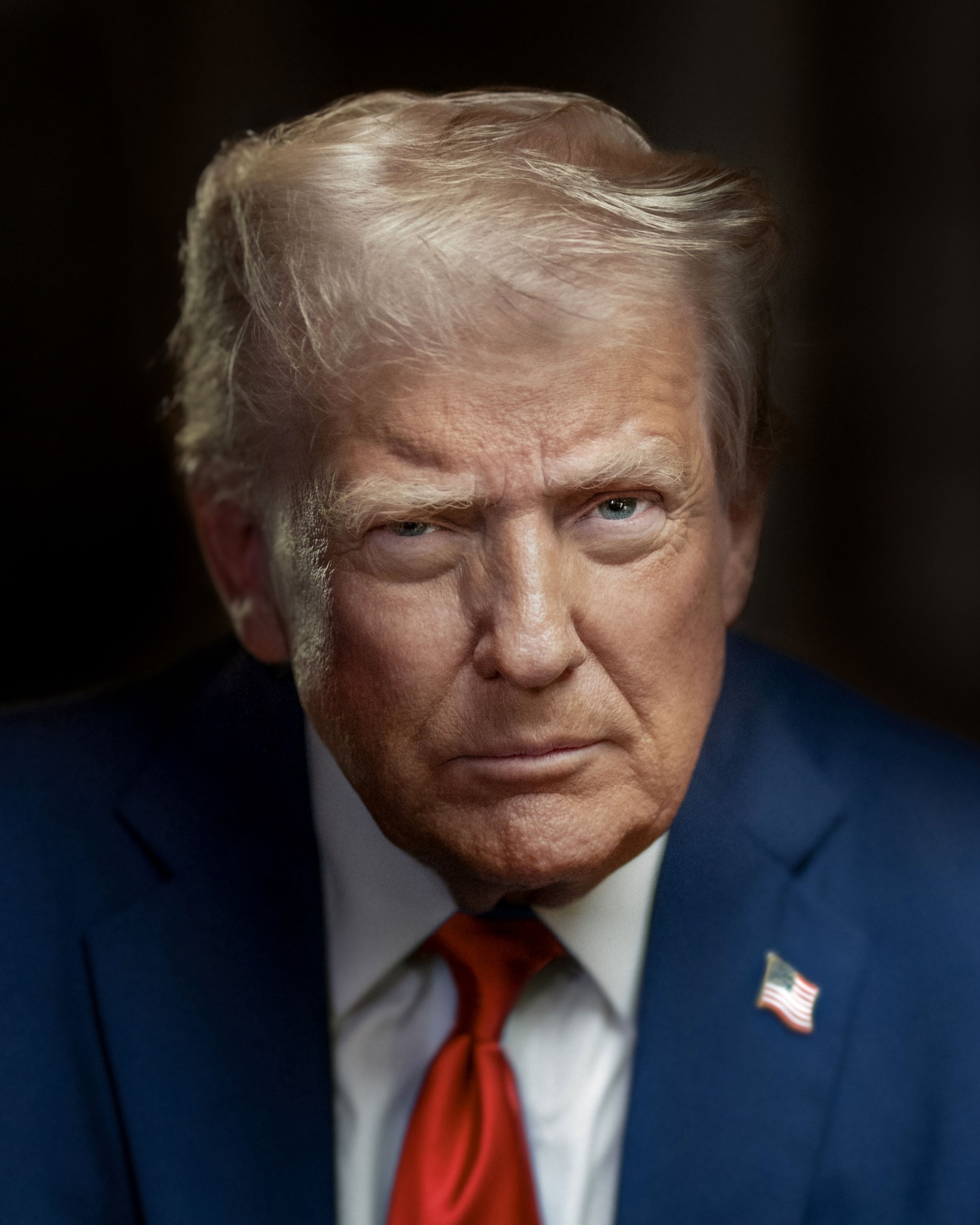
Donald Trump

Relations between Iran and the United States during Donald Trump's second term as the president of the United States consist of diplomatic pressure and military conflict. Since February 2026, the two countries have been engaged in an ongoing war.

Upon returning to office, Trump reinstated the maximum pressure campaign against Iran he pursued during his first term. He sent a letter to Iranian supreme leader Ali Khamenei proposing renewed talks regarding the nuclear program of Iran, and warning of possible military action if they failed. Amidst negotiations, Israel launched an attack on Iran, triggering the Twelve-Day War. The US joined the war by conducting strikes on Iranian nuclear sites on June 22, 2025, followed by the implementation of a ceasefire shortly afterwards. Diplomatic contact resumed intermittently over the following months.

From late 2025 to early 2026, Iran experienced widespread anti-government protests which were met with a violent crackdown. The US encouraged the protestors and warned of possible military action to defend them, initiating a military buildup in the Middle East. This culminated in the US and Israel starting a war against Iran on February 28, 2026, conducting strikes which killed Khamenei and other officials with goals of regime change and stopping their alleged pursuit of a nuclear weapon among other objectives. Iran and its proxies began launching attacks on Israel and US bases across the region and blocking traffic in the Strait of Hormuz, leading to a global economic crisis. Diplomatic channels remained open during the war resulting in the signing of a ceasefire and a memorandum to end it, both of which later fell apart.

== Background ==
By early 2025, Iran's regional influence significantly declined, after setbacks among its proxies and allies. Its proxies—Hamas, Hezbollah, and the Houthis—suffered major setbacks following the October 7 Hamas-led attack on Israel and the subsequent conflicts. The collapse of Bashar al-Assad's regime in Syria critically disrupted Iranian supply routes, severely impacting Hamas and Hezbollah. Russia, Iran's key ally, struggled to provide support as its prolonged war in Ukraine drained resources, further weakening the regional influence of the Iran-led axis.

During Trump's first term (2017–2021), the U.S. withdrew from the 2015 Joint Comprehensive Plan of Action (JCPOA) and imposed maximum-pressure sanctions, severely restricting Iran's oil exports and financial access. His administration sought to renegotiate the deal to impose stricter limits on Iran's nuclear program and curb its funding of regional proxies but failed to reach a new agreement. Under Biden (2021–2025), Iran's economy remained strained, though sanctions enforcement fluctuated. By early 2025, inflation soared, the currency collapsed, and domestic unrest intensified as Iran faced economic isolation while advancing its nuclear program.

Iran's uniquely weakened position now presents a rare opportunity for the United States to reshape the region. During his first term, Trump abandoned the JCPOA in hopes of forging a tougher deal that would impose stricter limits on Iran's nuclear program and its proxy funding—a move that ultimately failed. Many analysts argue that had the original deal remained intact, it could have paved the way for regional stability and a structured U.S. withdrawal, reducing America's long-term military footprint. Now, with his second term just beginning, the stakes are high. If decisive steps are taken to secure a new comprehensive agreement, Iran's ambitions could be reined in, fostering stability and paving the way for an orderly exit of American forces. Conversely, without such bold action, there is a significant risk that U.S. troops could remain entrenched in the Middle East for decades to come.

Elon Musk met with Iran's UN Ambassador, Saeid Iravani, on November 11, 2024. In January 2025, Elon Musk reportedly helped Italy's prime minister Giorgia Meloni secure the release of Italian citizen Cecila Sala from an Iranian prison.

At the outset of the second Trump administration in January 2025, Iran was led by president Masoud Pezeshkian. He was a member of the reformist faction, and during his presidential campaign he promised to steer Iran in a less conservative direction and mend relations with Western states. The ultimate authority rested with Supreme Leader Ali Khamenei, who held decisive power over Iran’s foreign and security policies. Relations between the U.S. and Iran were deeply strained, with no formal diplomatic ties since 1980. Since Trump's first presidency, the United States had withdrawn from the nuclear deal JCPOA, and previous president Joe Biden saw no possibility of reviving it. In January 2025, there were no ongoing talks between Iran and the U.S.

== Maximum pressure campaign ==
In February 2025, President Donald Trump signed a National Security Presidential Memorandum reinstating the "maximum pressure" campaign against Iran, aiming to compel Tehran to negotiate a new nuclear agreement while preventing its development of nuclear weapons and countering its regional influence. The memorandum mandates heightened economic sanctions targeting Iran's oil exports, with the objective of reducing them to zero, and directs the revocation of existing sanctions waivers. Trump stated he would rather make a deal than take military action against Iran, framing the pressure campaign as a means to force diplomacy. This policy has led to significant economic challenges within Iran, including a sharp currency depreciation and political instability, as evidenced by the resignation of key officials such as Vice President Mohammad Javad Zarif and the impeachment of Economy Minister Abdolnaser Hemmati. While proponents argue that these measures are necessary to curb Iran's nuclear ambitions and support for militant groups, critics contend that the campaign exacerbates humanitarian issues and regional tensions without effectively altering Iran's strategic behavior.

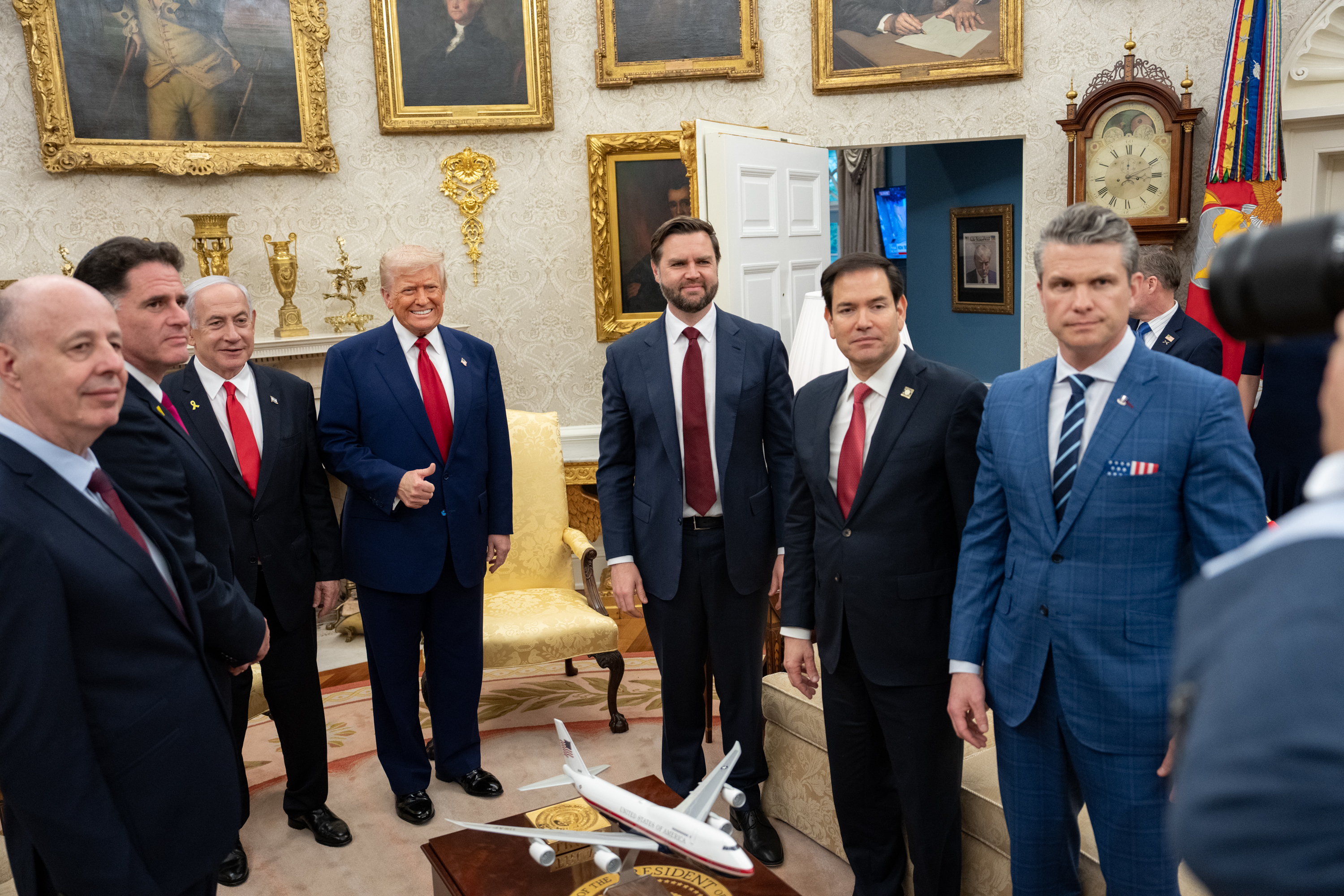
Netanyahu and Trump discussed the threat from Iran at the White House on April 7, 2025.

== Bilateral talks ==
In March 2025, U.S. President Donald Trump confirmed that he sent a letter to Iran's Supreme Leader Ayatollah Ali Khamenei, urging negotiations for a new nuclear agreement to replace the 2015 deal from which he withdrew in 2018. Emphasizing a preference for diplomacy, Trump warned of potential military action should negotiations fail. Iran officially responded to Trump's letter via Oman on March 26, rejecting direct talks under pressure but leaving the door open to indirect negotiations. Days later the U.S. deployed four B-2 Spirit stealth bombers to Diego Garcia—over 20% of the total B-2 fleet. Though officially aimed at deterring Iran-backed Houthi rebels in Yemen, some analysts suggest the scale and capabilities of the deployment point to preparations for a potential strike on hardened Iranian nuclear targets like Fordow or Natanz, possibly in coordination with Israel. On March 30, President Trump escalated pressure by threatening bombing “the likes of which [Iran has] never seen” and warning of secondary tariffs. The deployment and rhetoric are widely seen as part of a calculated pressure campaign to force Tehran back to the table, as Iran's uranium enrichment levels continue to exceed the limits set by the original 2015 accord.

On April 25, 2025, Trump said he would not let Netanyahu drag him into a war with Iran and was interested in meeting with Iran's Ayatollah Ali Khamenei, but threatened a joint Israeli-US military operation to thwart Iran's nuclear program if diplomacy failed.

=== Iran–backed Houthis in Yemen ===
On March 15, 2025, the U.S. launched airstrikes on Houthi targets in Yemen to counter attacks on Red Sea shipping. President Trump stated the strikes aimed to restore navigation freedom and deter further aggression. The Houthi-run health ministry reported 31 deaths and over 100 injuries. The Iran-backed group vowed to continue targeting vessels until Israel lifted its Gaza blockade. Trump warned of further action, urging Iran to withdraw support.

In March 2025, the Trump administration accidentally included The Atlantic editor Jeffrey Goldberg in a Signal group chat discussing classified military plans to strike Houthi targets in Yemen. The chat involved top officials including Vice President JD Vance and Defense Secretary Pete Hegseth. The leak, dubbed “Signalgate,” sparked bipartisan outrage and serious concerns over national security and operational discipline. President Trump dismissed the incident as a minor error, but critics called it a major intelligence failure.

== Twelve-Day War and US intervention ==
In March 2025, US Director of National Intelligence, Tulsi Gabbard, testified that the US intelligence community, "continues to assess Iran is not building a nuclear weapon and Supreme Leader Khamenei has not authorized a nuclear weapons program". In April 2025, Trump announced negotiations between the United States and Iran regarding Iran's nuclear program. The White House declared that Iran had two months to secure a deal, which expired the day before Israel's strikes.

On June 13, 2025, President Trump praised the Israeli strikes on Iran as "excellent" and "very successful," and warned that Iran must "make a deal now" over its nuclear program or face "even more destructive and deadly military action." Trump authorized US forces to assist in intercepting the initial Iranian missile barrage. The US warned Iran against attacking American interests or personnel, emphasizing it would respond militarily if such attacks occurred. On June 17, Trump stated that a "real end" was better than a ceasefire. He then demanded unconditional surrender by Iran. Trump also threatened Iran's Supreme Leader Ali Khamenei saying that he is an "easy target" and could assassinate him at any moment. The threat came two days after it was reported that Trump allegedly vetoed a plan by Israel to assassinate the ayatollah. Some supporters of Trump in the United States have criticized Trump's support for Israeli strikes against Iran, and the possible involvement of the United States in the war. In a poll of Trump voters, 53% said the U.S. should not get involved in the Iran–Israel conflict.

On June 19, 2025, the White House said that Trump would decide "within two weeks" whether to join Israel's war against Iran. Trump's special envoy Steve Witkoff and Iranian Foreign Minister Abbas Araghchi have spoken by phone several times since the start of the Israeli strikes on Iran.

=== 2025 United States strikes on Iranian nuclear sites ===
President Trump addresses the nation after authorizing direct strikes in response to the Iran–Israel war in Iran, June 21, 2025

On June 22, 2025, the U.S. launched direct strikes on Iranian nuclear sites. The attack was the United States's only offensive action in the Iran–Israel war, which began on June 13 with surprise Israeli strikes and ended with the ceasefire on June 24, 2025.

A CNN poll conducted by SSRS after the airstrikes showed that a majority of Americans disapproved of Trump's decision to launch airstrikes against Iran by a margin of 56% to 44%.

On October 13, 2025, Trump stated that the United States was ready to reach an agreement with Iran. He expressed optimism that an agreement could be achieved. In response, Iranian foreign minister Araqchi said Tehran would consider any proposal from the United States that was “fair and balanced,” though he noted that no concrete framework for talks had yet been presented and that messages between the two sides were exchanged through intermediaries. Despite the conciliatory language from Trump, his administration maintained a firm stance toward Iran, and observers noted that significant barriers still stood in the way of improved relations between the two nations.

== 2025–26 Iranian protests and bilateral talks ==
In early January 2026, amid a widespread and increasingly violent crackdown on protesters on the 2025–2026 Iranian protests, President Donald Trump said the United States was considering a range of responses, including possible military options, if Iranian actions crossed what he described as a red line. He publicly encouraged Iranians to escalate mass protests and take over regime institutions, while stating that US assistance was forthcoming. He added that the US military was assessing “very strong options” and that senior advisers were preparing to discuss potential measures, while also noting that Iranian leaders had reached out for negotiations.

Iranian officials warned that any United States attack would trigger retaliation against United States forces and allied interests in the region. On January 16, 2026, Trump announced that the Iranian leadership had reportedly canceled over 800 planned executions, and he backed away from his threats to attack Iran.

While the protests in Iran were taking place, the US began building up a military force in the Middle-East, that was deployed near Iran. On 27 January 2026, a day after the deployment of the USS Abraham Lincoln to the region, the United States announced a multi-day aerial military exercise. The same day, Trump said that another naval fleet was heading toward Iran. Separately, the Pentagon ordered US Air Force F-15E Strike Eagles based at Royal Air Force Lakenheath in Britain to redeploy to American air bases in Jordan. Reports from February 2026, claim that according to satellite imagery the US force build up includes fighter jets, warships and missile-defense systems. According to analysts the deployments are visible at bases in Qatar, Oman and Jordan, and say they can support both offensive operations and defenses against Iranian retaliation.

Indirect negotiations between Iran and the United States resumed in Oman on February 6, 2026. These were the first negotiations between the two sides since the Iran–Israel war the previous summer. The discussions were mediated by Oman, and they involved Iranian Foreign Minister Abbas Araghchi and United States envoy Steve Witkoff. The two sides disagreed over the scope of the discussions, but did agree to hold follow up meetings. The talks were held against the backdrop of a United States military buildup in the Middle East and followed threats by President Trump to strike Iran if it used lethal force against protesters or refused to conclude a nuclear agreement.

== 2026 Iran war ==
President Trump addresses the nation after authorizing joint strikes against Iran, February 28, 2026

Government reactions to the 2026 Iran war: Iran Israel and the United States Countries that supported the Israeli-American attacks Countries that condemned the Iranian attacks Countries that condemned both attacks Countries that condemned the Israeli-American attacks Countries that expressed mixed reactions or made calls for peace No government reaction

On February 28, 2026, the U.S. and Israeli militaries launched joint strikes on Iran with the stated goal of regime change.

Opinion polling showed that most Americans were unsupportive of US military action against Iran. According to The Guardian, 27% of Americans were supportive of the US operation while 43% were opposed and 29% were uncertain. President Trump reacted to the disapproval by denying that opinion polling showed low approval ratings, also adding "I don't care about polling".

=== Assassination of Ali Khamenei ===
On 28 February 2026, Ali Khamenei, the supreme leader of Iran, was assassinated in Tehran as part of a series of Israeli airstrikes aimed at high-ranking Iranian officials. Khamenei's death was confirmed by the Iranian government on 1 March. His death occurred on the first day of the 2026 Iran war, as part of a wider joint operation by Israel and the United States using strategic locations intelligence from the US's Central Intelligence Agency to determine the whereabouts of several leaders. Satellite imagery suggested that Khamenei's residence in the city was severely damaged during the attack.

Following initial Israeli reports that Khamenei had been killed in the operation, US president Donald Trump and Israeli prime minister Benjamin Netanyahu stated that Khamenei was dead. After Iranian state media confirmed his death, the government announced 40 days of mourning and seven days of public holiday. The Fars News Agency announced that Khamenei's daughter, granddaughter, son-in-law and daughter-in-law had also been killed in the strikes. Despite an initial announcement that Khamenei's wife, Mansoureh Khojasteh Bagherzadeh, had died from her injuries on 2 March, Fars reported on 12 March that she was still alive.

Reactions to Khamenei's death in Iran were mixed. While many civilians went out to celebrate in the streets, thousands of others gathered in mourning. Protests against the 2026 Iran war occurred in multiple countries. Iranian diaspora members around the world participated in joyful gatherings.

A previous plan to assassinate Khamenei by Israel during the Twelve-Day War on 15 June 2025 was vetoed by Trump, according to unnamed US officials.

President Trump announces the death of Ali Khamenei, March 1, 2026

== See also ==
- Foreign relations of Iran
- Foreign policy of the second Trump administration
- Iran–United States relations during the George W. Bush administration
- Iran–United States relations during the Obama administration
- Iran–United States relations during the first Trump administration
- Iran–United States relations during the Biden administration
- Views on military action against Iran
