= Tim Guldimann =

Swiss former diplomat and politician

His Excellency Tim Guldimann PhD
- Guidimann in 2015

Member of the National Council (Switzerland)
- In office 30 November 2015 – 14 March 2018
- Succeeded by: Fabian Molina
- Constituency: Canton of Zürich

Ambassador of Switzerland to Germany
- In office 2010–2015

Personal details
- Born: Urs Christian Timotheus Guldimann; 19 September 1950 (age 76) Zürich, Switzerland
- Citizenship: Switzerland; Germany (naturalized)
- Party: Social Democratic Party
- Other political affiliations: Social Democratic Party of Germany (since 2021)
- Spouse: Christiane Hoffmann
- Children: 2
- Education: University of Zurich (PhD)
- Occupation: Diplomat, politician
- Website: Official website Parliament website

Urs Christian Timotheus Guldimann abbreviated as Tim Guldimann (German: [tɪm ˈɡʊldɪman]; born 19 September 1950) is a Swiss political scientist and former diplomat and politician who previously served on the National Council (Switzerland) for the Social Democratic Party from 2015 to 2018. He was the first Swiss abroad ever elected to federal office.

Previously, Guldimann held the post of Ambassador of Switzerland to Germany between 2010 and 2015 and in Iran from 1997 to 2004, where he served as liaison between the country and the United States and important mediator for Iran-United States relations. In 2021, Guldimann naturalized as German citizen since his wife and children are citizens. He holds dual citizenship of Switzerland and Germany.

== Early life and education ==
Guldimann was born 19 September 1950 in Zürich, Switzerland, the eldest of five sons, to Werner Guldimann and May (née Steuer). His father was a pilot, aviation expert and most notably director for the Federal Office of Civil Aviation. His mother was municipal councilor of Uitikon for the Christian Democratic People's Party. He had four younger brothers including: Tobias Guldimann, who was formerly Chief Risk Officer at Credit Suisse. Till M. Guldimann was a former executive of SunGard.

He attended Gymnasium Enge where he completed his Matura and then studied Economics at the University of Zürich graduating with a PhD.

== Diplomatic career ==
Guldimann began working for the Federal Department of Foreign Affairs in 1982, retiring in 1991. From 1996 to 1999, worked as negotiator for the Organization for Security and Co-operation in Europe in Croatia and Chechnya.

Guldimann re-entered the Swiss foreign service as Swiss ambassador to Iran from 1997 to 2004. During his term, he was responsible for the "Grand Bargain" proposal, known as the Swiss Memorandum in German. On 4 May 2003, the Swiss government sent the U.S. State Department an unsigned one-page memorandum, which was not on official letterhead, and contained a cover letter by Guldimann which laid out a roadmap for discussions between Iran and the U.S. In the cover letter, Guldimann claimed that he developed the document with Sadegh Kharazi, the Iranian ambassador in Paris, and that Supreme Leader Ali Khamenei agreed with 85–90% of the paper, although he could not obtain a precise answer on what exactly the Leader explicitly has agreed.

The document outlined several topics for potential negotiations between the two countries and suggested establishing three parallel working groups focused on disarmament, regional security, and economic cooperation. Among the central issues were:

- The lifting of all U.S. sanctions imposed on Iran
- Joint efforts with the United States to support stability in Iraq
- Complete openness regarding Iran's nuclear activities, including implementation of the Additional Protocol
- Collaboration in combating terrorist groups, especially the Mujahedin-e Khalq and al-Qaeda
- Acknowledgement of the 2002 Arab League “land for peace” declaration concerning Israel and Palestine
- Unrestricted Iranian access to civilian nuclear technology, along with chemical and biotechnological advancements

The Bush administration rejected the proposal, opting instead to increase pressure on Iran.

Guldimann was appointed OSCE Envoy to Ukraine in 2014. He was criticized by some American and European diplomats for his perceived pro-Russian bias.

== Political career ==
Guldimann served for two-and-a-half years as a member of the National Council, representing Zürich for the Social Democratic Party of Switzerland before resigning in March 2018. He was the first Swiss legislator elected while living abroad, in Berlin, where he had previously served as Swiss ambassador to Germany. He remained as an expatriate in Berlin while serving as a National Councillor. After his resignation, his seat was succeeded by Fabian Molina.

== Personal life ==
Guldimann has been married to German Christiane Hoffmann (born 1967). They have two daughters and reside in Berlin, Germany. His family played a leading role in his decision to resign from public office in 2018.
