= Maximum pressure campaign =

Intensified sanctions against Iran by the Trump administration

Maximum pressure campaign refers to the intensified sanctions against Iran by the Trump administration after the United States exited the Joint Comprehensive Plan of Action (JCPOA) in 2018. The campaign was aimed at pressuring Iran to renegotiate the JCPOA, adding more restrictions on Iran's nuclear program and expanding the scope of the agreement to cover Iran's ballistic missiles as well as other regional activities. This strategy was faced by Iran's counter pressure policy to thwart the U.S. maximum pressure campaign.

According to Human Rights Watch, the current economic sanctions are causing “unnecessary suffering to Iranian citizens afflicted with a range of diseases and medical conditions," despite exemptions for the humanitarian goods.

In February 2025, amidst the Iranian energy and economic crises, Trump signed a national security directive to restore the maximum pressure policy against the Iranian regime.

== First Trump presidency ==
=== Sanctions ===
In May 2018, U.S. president Donald Trump withdrew from the nuclear deal with Iran and imposed several new non-nuclear sanctions against Iran, some of which were condemned by Iran as a violation of the deal. In November 2018, the U.S. officially reimposed all sanctions against Iran that had been lifted before the U.S. withdrawal from the JCPOA.

Elizabeth Rosenberg, a former U.S. Treasury Department official told NPR that the program include sanctioning "some Iranian financial institutions not previously designated and that were previously used to facilitate food, medicine and medical imports." To this end, most large Iranian financial institutions are subject to the sanctions.

On June 7, 2025 the U.S. Treasury Department imposed sanctions on 10 individuals and 27 entities, including Iranian nationals and firms based in the UAE and Hong Kong. These targets include the Zarringhalam brothers, accused of laundering billions via shell companies tied to the IRGC and the Central Bank of Iran. The funds reportedly supported Iran's nuclear and missile programs, oil sales, and terrorist proxies.

=== Outcomes ===
According to a report from the International Monetary Fund, Iran's Gross Official Reserves fell from an average of $70 billion in 2017 to $4 billion in 2020. Certain analysts believe the campaign failed to change Iran's regional activities or counter Iran's proxy influence in the region, force Iran to renegotiate the nuclear deal and hinder its nuclear and missile programs. In 2019, Iranian President Hassan Rouhani said that U.S. sanctions had deprived the Iranian economy of $200 billion in oil revenue and investments. Senior officials in the administration of Ebrahim Raisi, the president of Iran who took office after the Maximum Pressure Campaign's termination, claimed that oil sales in the initial months of Raisi's presidency had jumped by 40 percent despite being under "stringent US sanctions".

The campaign was criticized by some foreign policy analysts as being poorly conceived and counterproductive to other American foreign policy goals. David Wallsh, writing for the Atlantic Council, posited that "an exclusively punitive policy unaccompanied by diplomatic off-ramps incentivizes Tehran to fight fire with fire by imposing costs on its perceived aggressors."

Other concerns had been raised regarding the negative effect of the program on the welfare of the Iranian populace. One analysis by Human Rights Watch argued the redoubled U.S. sanctions had effectively constrained Iran's "ability to finance [...] humanitarian imports", due to the broad U.S. sanctions against Iranian banks, accompanied by the "aggressive rhetoric from U.S. officials". The intensified sanctions have seriously threatened Iranians' right to health and access to essential medicines, causing documented shortages—ranging from a lack of vital drugs for patients with epilepsy to limited chemotherapy medications for treating Iranian cancer patients.

=== Reactions ===
The United Arab Emirates expressed its absolute support for the United States continuing the maximum pressure against Iran. Israeli politicians have also expressed support for the program.

The United Nations Special Rapporteur on Human Rights in Iran said in July 2019 that he was "not only concerned that sanctions and banking restrictions will unduly affect food security and the availability and distribution of medicines, pharmaceutical equipment and supplies, but is also concerned at their potential negative impact on United Nations and other operations and programs in the country."

In November 2021, during the presidency of Ebrahim Raisi and the beginning of a new round of nuclear talks, Ali Bagheri Kani, Iran's chief nuclear negotiator has said that in the seventh round of talks to revive the IAEA nuclear deal, the Islamic Republic of Iran called for the lifting of all sanctions against the US campaign of maximum pressure as a prelude to the resumption of talks.

== Second Trump presidency ==
"National Security Presidential Memorandum on Imposing Maximum Pressure on the Government of the Islamic Republic of Iran, Denying Iran All Paths to a Nuclear Weapon, and Countering Iran's Malign Influence" which Trump signed in February 2025

On February 4, 2025, Trump reinstated his 2018 Maximum Pressure Campaign against Iran. This included efforts to restrict Iran's oil export bringing it down to zero, as well as intensify sanctions, essentially reviving the hard line approach from his first administration. In late 2025 and early 2026, there was a growing unrest within Iran as nationwide protests started, that were violently suppressed by the Iranian regime. In response, the US deployed naval forces including an aircraft carrier to the Middle-East in January 2026. Trump then called for an end to Iran's nuclear ambitions while US military build-up near Iran continued throughout January-February 2026, including another aircraft carrier, warships, and air assets. This eventually culminated in the US and Israel engaging in a currently ongoing war with Iran beginning on 28 February 2026.

== See also ==
- Humanitarian impacts of U.S. sanctions against Iran
- Iranian frozen assets
- Iran–United States relations during the first Trump administration
- Iran–United States relations during the second Trump administration
