= Iran Freedom and Support Act =

2006 US legislation

- Long title: An Act to hold the current regime in Iran accountable for its threatening behavior and to support a transition to democracy in Iran.
- Enacted by: the 109th United States Congress
- Effective: September 30, 2006

Citations
- Public law: 109-293
- Statutes at Large: 120 Stat. 1344

Legislative history
- Introduced in the House as H.R. 6198 by Ileana Ros-Lehtinen (R-FL) on September 27, 2006; Committee consideration by House International Relations, House Financial Services; Passed the House on September 28, 2006 (agreed voice vote); Passed the Senate on September 30, 2006 (passed unanimous consent); Signed into law by President George W. Bush on September 30, 2006

The Iran Freedom Support Act (Pub. L. 109–293 (text) (PDF), 120 Stat. 1344, H.R. 6198, enacted September 30, 2006) is an Act of Congress that appropriated $10 million and directed the President of the United States to spend that money in support of "pro-democracy groups" opposed to the Iranian government. Opponents claimed the bill was a first step towards a US-led invasion of the country.

In response to the passage of the bill, President George W. Bush lauded the Congress "for demonstrating its bipartisan commitment to confronting the Iranian regime's repressive and destabilizing activities."

== Possible recipients of money ==
American authorities have refused to announce the names of groups that have received money under this act, and no group has officially acknowledged this either.

== Reaction ==
Following introduction of the bill in the Senate, Iran responded "those who draft such plans lag behind the times, they live in their daydreams."

== See also ==
- Iran–United States relations during the G.W. Bush administration
