= Iran–United States relations during the George W. Bush administration =

Iran–United States relations during the George W. Bush administration relations

- Iran: United States

Diplomatic mission
- Interests Section in the Pakistani Embassy, Washington, D.C.: Interests Section in the Swiss Embassy, Tehran

Envoy
- Director of the Interest Section Mehdi Atefat: United States Special Representative for Iran Abram Paley

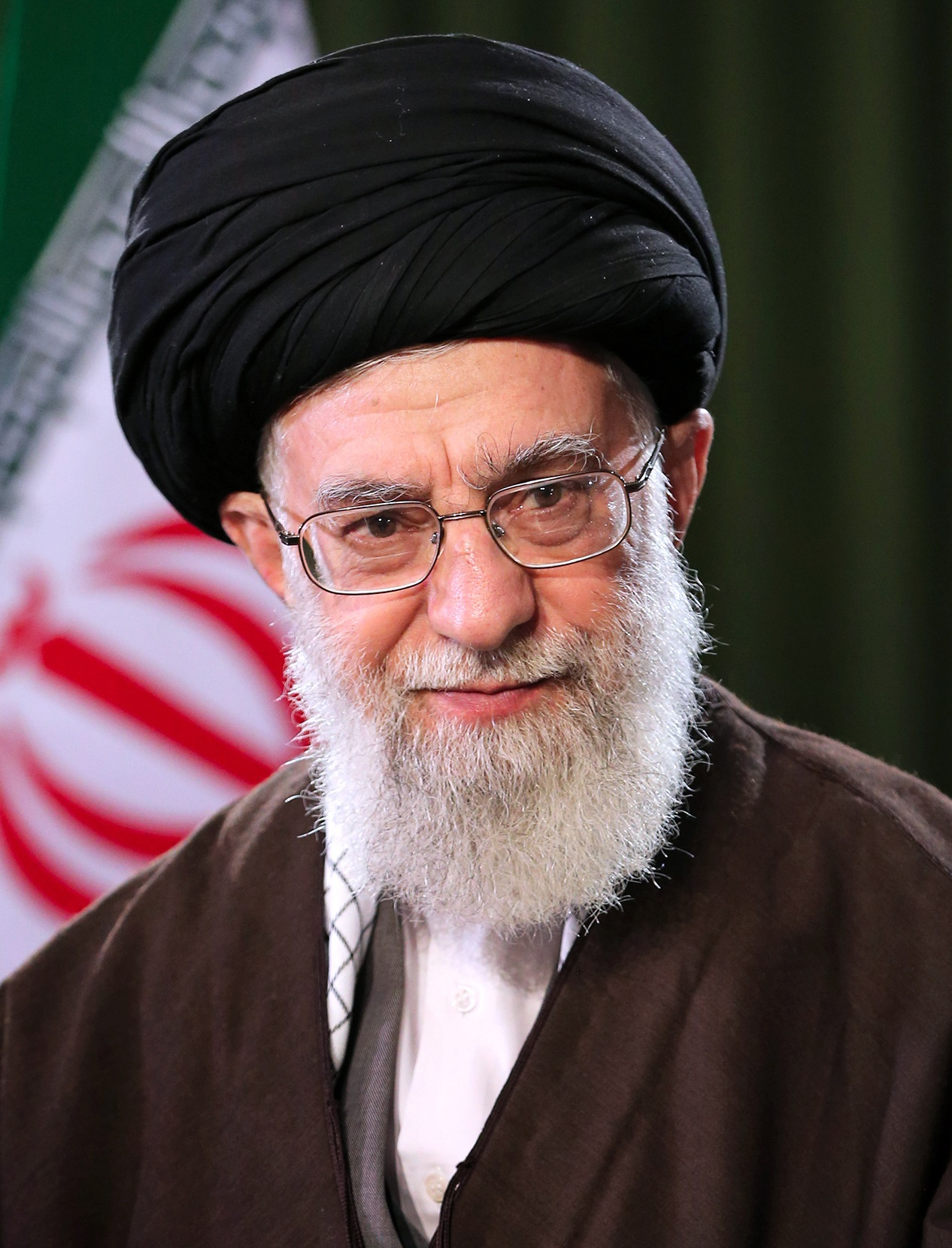
Ali Khamenei

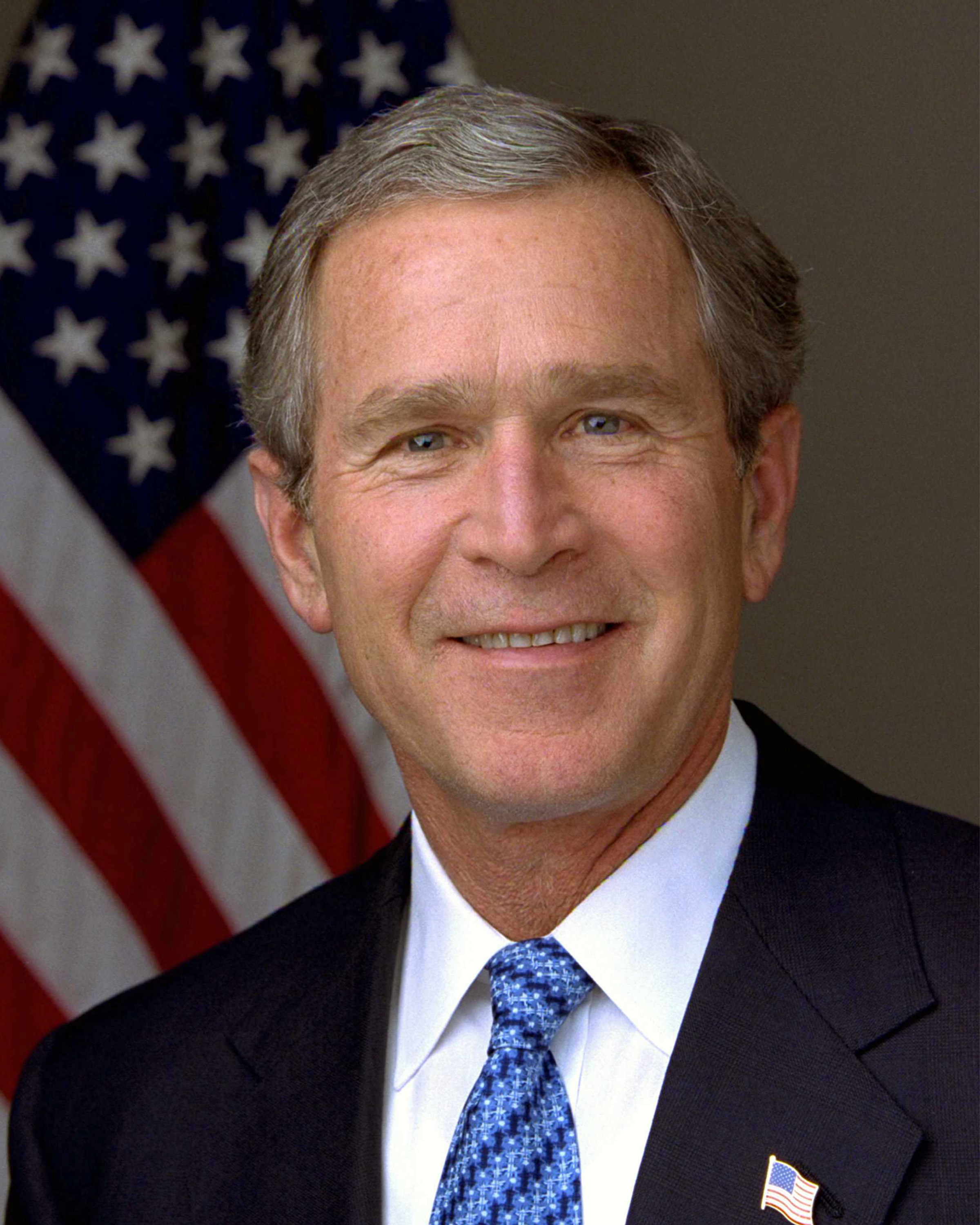
George W. Bush

Iran–United States relations during the George W. Bush administration (2001–2009) were marked by heightened tensions, mutual distrust, and periodic attempts at limited engagement. Following the September 11 attacks in 2001, Iran initially was sympathetic with the United States. However, relations deteriorated sharply after President George W. Bush labeled Iran part of the "Axis of Evil" in 2002, accusing the country of pursuing weapons of mass destruction that posed a threat to the U.S. In 2003, Swiss Ambassador Tim Guldimann relayed an unofficial proposal to the U.S. outlining a possible "grand bargain" with Iran. He claimed it was developed in cooperation with Iran, but it lacked formal Iranian endorsement, and the Bush administration did not pursue the offer.

Between 2003 and 2008, Iran accused the United States of repeatedly violating its territorial sovereignty through drone incursions, covert operations, and support for opposition groups. In August 2005, Mahmoud Ahmadinejad became Iran's president. During his presidency, attempts at dialogue, including a personal letter to President Bush, were dismissed by U.S. officials, while public tensions grew over Iran’s nuclear program, U.S. foreign policy, and Ahmadinejad’s controversial remarks at international forums.

The United States intensified covert operations against Iran, including alleged support for militant groups such as PEJAK and Jundullah, cross-border activities, and expanded CIA and Special Forces missions. Iran was repeatedly accused by the U.S. of arming and training Iraqi insurgents, including Shiite militias and groups linked to Hezbollah, with American officials citing captured weapons, satellite images, and detainee testimonies. During this period, additional flashpoints included the U.S. raid on Iran's consulate in Erbil, sanctions targeting Iranian financial institutions, a naval dispute in the Strait of Hormuz, and the public disclosure of covert action plans against Iran.

== State of Iran-U.S. relations in January 2001 ==
At the outset of the George W. Bush administration in January 2001, Iran was led by President Mohammad Khatami, a reformist known for advocating dialogue with the West, while ultimate authority rested with Supreme Leader Ali Khamenei, who held decisive power over Iran’s foreign and security policies. The previous Clinton administration had adopted a policy of dual containment toward Iran, which included efforts to restrain it from taking actions seen as harmful to the interests of the United States, but it had also responded positively to President Khatami’s 1998 call for dialogue with the American people.

== September 11 attacks ==
On September 25, 2001, Iran's president Mohammad Khatami meeting British Foreign Secretary, Jack Straw, said: "Iran fully understands the feelings of the Americans about the terrorist attacks in New York and Washington on September 11." He said although the American administrations had been at best indifferent about terrorist operations in Iran (since 1979), the Iranians instead felt differently and had expressed their sympathetic feelings with bereaved Americans in the tragic incidents in the two cities. He also stated that "Nations should not be punished in place of terrorists." According to Radio Farda's website, when the attacks' news was released, some Iranian citizens gathered in front of the Embassy of Switzerland in Tehran, which serves as the protecting power of the United States in Iran (US interests protecting office in Iran), to express their sympathy and some of them lit candles as a symbol of mourning.

This piece of news at Radio Farda's website also states that in 2011, on the anniversary of the attacks, the United States Department of State published a post at its blog, in which the Department thanked Iranian people for their sympathy and stated that they would never forget Iranian people's kindness on those harsh days. The attacks were condemned by both the President and the Supreme Leader of Iran. BBC and Time magazine published reports on holding candlelit vigils for the victims by Iranian citizens at their websites. According to Politico magazine, following the attacks, Sayyed Ali Khamenei, the Supreme Leader of Iran, "suspended the usual "Death to America" chants at Friday prayers" temporarily. The military forces of the United States of America and the Islamic Republic of Iran cooperated with each other to overthrow the Taliban regime which had conflicts with the government of Iran. Iran's Quds Force helped US forces and Afghan rebels in 2001 uprising in Herat.

== "Axis of evil" speech ==
On January 29, 2002, U.S. President George W. Bush labeled Iran, along with North Korea and Iraq, as part of the "Axis of Evil" in a speech. He added that Iran aggressively pursues missiles and weapons of mass destruction and supports militant groups abroad, while a small, unelected elite suppresses the Iranian people's aspirations for freedom. The speech sparked outrage in Iran, drawing condemnation from both reformists and conservatives, with Masoumeh Ebtekar calling it a "strategic mistake" by the Bush administration. Daniel Heradstveit and G. Matthew Bonham argued that the speech caused a reversal in friendly US–Iranian relations that had developed after the Cold War; the Iranian opposition figures they interviewed saw it as a "betrayal", and widely agreed that it was "a godsend to the conservatives", who favored a more hostile and militant approach towards the United States.

== Guldimann's "Grand Bargain" proposal ==
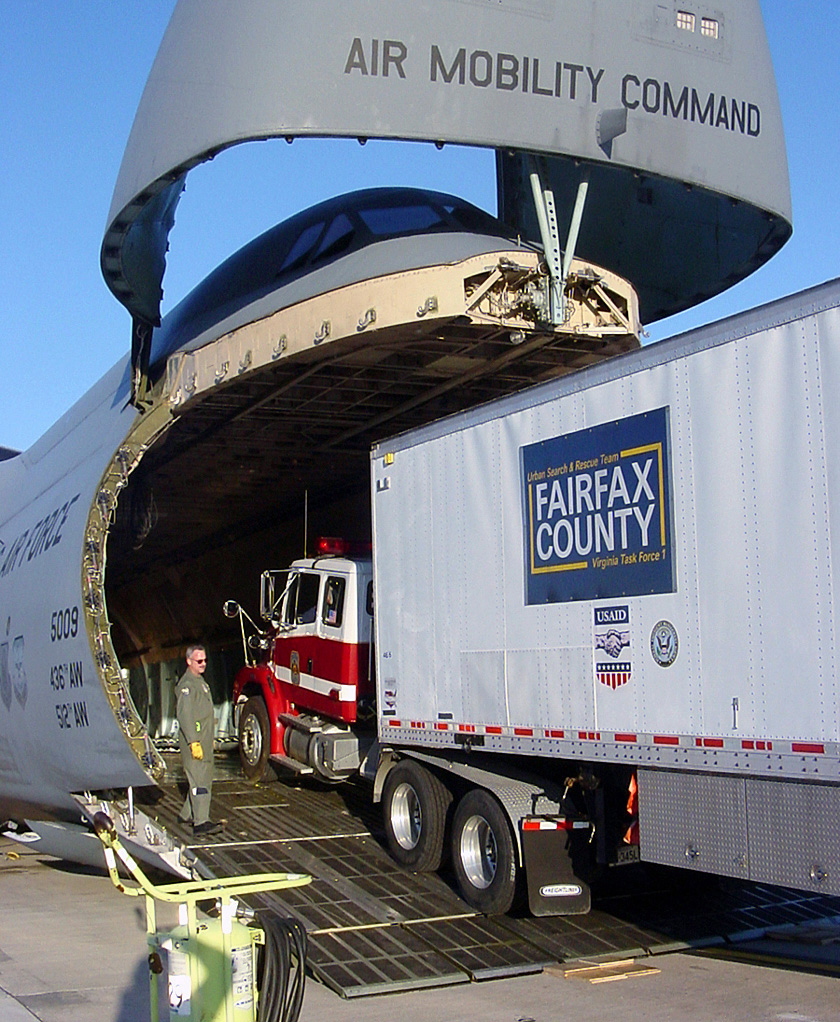
A tractor-trailer from Fairfax County, Virginia's Urban Search and Rescue Team loaded aboard a C-5 Galaxy heading for Bam, Iran

On 4 May 2003, the Swiss government sent the U.S. State Department an unsigned one-page memorandum, which was not on official letterhead, and contained a cover letter by Swiss diplomat Tim Guldimann which laid out a roadmap for discussions between Iran and the U.S. In the cover letter, Guldimann claimed that he developed the document with Sadegh Kharazi, the Iranian ambassador in Paris, and that Supreme Leader Ali Khamenei agreed with 85–90% of the paper, although he could not obtain a precise answer on what exactly the Leader explicitly has agreed.

The document outlined several topics for potential negotiations between the two countries and suggested establishing three parallel working groups focused on disarmament, regional security, and economic cooperation. Among the central issues were:

- The lifting of all U.S. sanctions imposed on Iran
- Joint efforts with the United States to support stability in Iraq
- Complete openness regarding Iran's nuclear activities, including implementation of the Additional Protocol
- Collaboration in combating terrorist groups, especially the Mujahedin-e Khalq and al-Qaeda
- Acknowledgement of the 2002 Arab League “land for peace” declaration concerning Israel and Palestine
- Unrestricted Iranian access to civilian nuclear technology, along with chemical and biotechnological advancements

The Bush administration rejected the proposal, opting instead to increase pressure on Iran.

== Presidency of Mahmoud Ahmadinejad ==
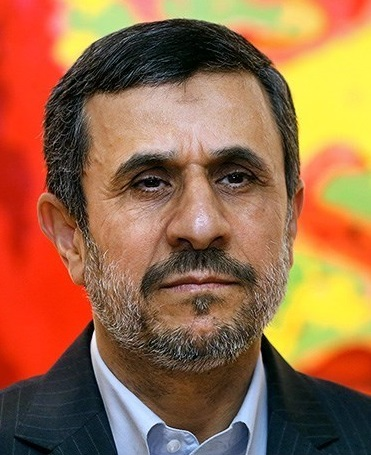
Mahmoud Ahmadinejad

In August 2005, Mahmoud Ahmadinejad became Iran's president. On 8 May 2006, he sent a personal letter to President Bush to propose "new ways" to end Iran's nuclear dispute. US Secretary of State Condoleezza Rice and National Security Adviser Stephen Hadley dismissed it as a negotiating ploy and publicity stunt that did not address American concerns about Iran's nuclear program. Ahmadinejad later said that "the letter was an invitation to monotheism and justice".

Bush insisted in August 2006 that there must be consequences for Iran's continued enrichment of uranium. He said that "the world now faces a grave threat from the radical regime in Iran." Ahmadinejad invited Bush to a debate at the UN General Assembly, which was to take place on September 18, 2006. The debate was to be about Iran's right to enrich uranium. The invitation was promptly rejected by White House spokesman Tony Snow.

In November 2006, Ahmadinejad wrote an open letter to the American people, stating that dialogue was urgently needed because of American activities in the Middle East and that the United States was concealing the truth about relations.

=== 2007 Visit to the U.S. ===
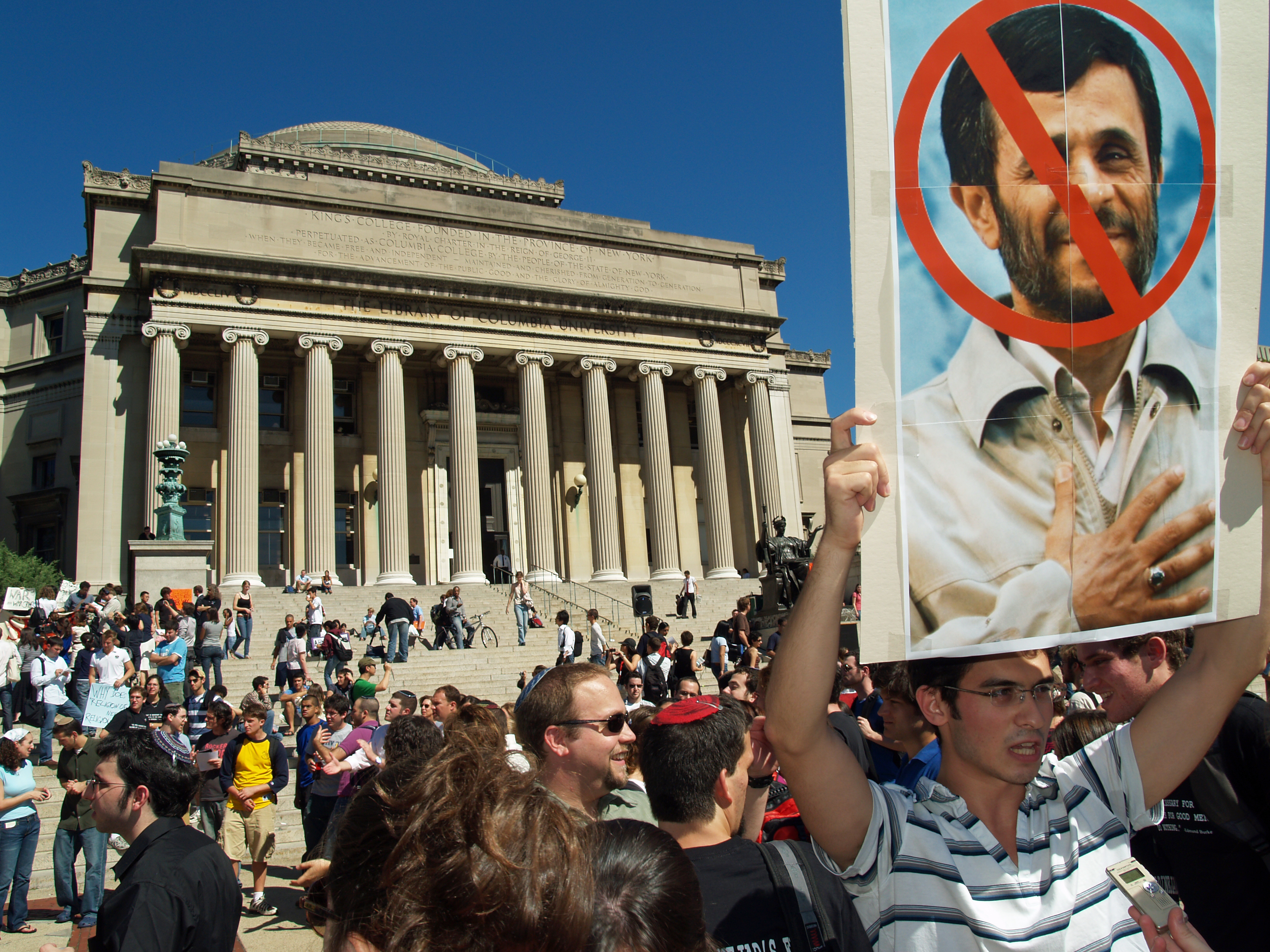
Columbia University students protesting against the university's decision to invite Mahmoud Ahmadinejad to the university campus

In September 2007, Ahmadinejad visited the United States. He gave a speech at Columbia University, after a harsh reception from the university president Lee Bollinger, who accused the strict ruler of acting like “a petty and cruel dictator.” Ahmadinejad answered a query about the treatment of gays in Iran by denying the existence of homosexuality in his country. An aide later said he was misrepresented and meant that, compared to American society, Iran has fewer homosexuals.

Ahmadinejad was not permitted to lay a wreath at the World Trade Center site. In an interview he said, "Many innocent people were killed. We are very much against any terrorist action and killing, and against sowing discord among nations. You usually go to such sites to pay respects and discuss root causes." When told that some Americans saw Iran as exporting terrorism and would be offended by the photo op, he replied, “How can you speak for the whole American nation? ... It has 300 million people with different views.”

The next day, Ahmadinejad addressed the UN General Assembly. He defended Iran’s nuclear program as entirely peaceful and transparent. He charged the United States and its allies with hypocrisy for criticizing his government, pointing to practices like secret prisons, abductions, lack of due process, and widespread surveillance.

=== Later statements ===
In an April 2008 speech, Ahmadinejad described the September 11 attacks as a "suspect event", saying that all that happened was a building collapsed. He stated that the death toll was never published, the victims' names were never published, and that the attacks were used subsequently as pretext for the invasions of Afghanistan and Iraq. That October, he expressed happiness about the 2008 global economic crisis. He said the West has been driven to a dead-end and that Iran was proud "to put an end to liberal economy". The previous month, he had told the UN General Assembly, "The American empire in the world is reaching the end of its road, and its next rulers must limit their interference to their own borders".

== Iran's nuclear program ==
Since 2003, the U.S. has accused Iran of seeking to develop nuclear weapons, though Iran insists its program is solely for peaceful energy purposes. The U.S. has repeatedly stated that a nuclear-armed Iran is unacceptable, while the UK, France, and Germany have tried to negotiate with Iran to halt its nuclear enrichment. Tensions escalated as the IAEA reported Iran's non-compliance with safeguards and the U.S. criticized IAEA head Mohamed ElBaradei for being lenient on Iran. By 2006, analysts reported that Iran had enough unenriched uranium to potentially make ten nuclear bombs, increasing calls for action from the UN Security Council.

On February 20, 2007, before the expiration of the United Nations Security Council deadline asking Iran to suspend uraninium enrichment, Ali Larijani, Iran's Head of the National Security Council, warned that “double standards will severely damage the credibility of international bodies“. He added: “I think certain countries are seeking adventure on Iran’s nuclear case. You know that some countries until now have not signed the NPT, but are conducting nuclear activities,“ regretting that no action has been taken against such countries while the UN Security Council has passed a resolution against Iran.

In a Question and Answer session following his address to Columbia University on September 24, 2007, Iranian president Mahmoud Ahmadinejad remarked: "I think the politicians who are after atomic bombs, or testing them, making them, politically they are backward, retarded."

=== Stuxnet ===
During president Bush's second term, General James Cartwright, then head of United States Strategic Command, along with other intelligence officials presented Bush with sophisticated code that would act as an offensive cyber weapon. The resulting operation, code-named Operation Olympic Games, aimed to gain access to the Natanz plant's industrial computer controls; the computer code would invade the specialized computers that command the centrifuges. Collaboration happened with Israel's SIGINT intelligence service, Unit 8200. Israel's involvement was important to the United States because the former had "deep intelligence about operations at Natanz that would be vital to making the cyber attack a success." Additionally, American officials hoped to "dissuade the Israelis from carrying out their own pre-emptive strike against Iranian nuclear facilities". To prevent a conventional strike, Israel had to be deeply involved in Operation Olympic Games. The resulting program eventually produced the computer virus Stuxnet that disabled nearly 1,000 centrifuges at Iran’s Natanz nuclear facility and accidentally spread beyond Iran in 2010.

== US covert operations inside Iran ==
Several claims have been made that the US has violated Iranian territorial sovereignty since 2003, including drones, and by allegedly supporting Kurdish insurgent groups such as the Party for a Free Life in Kurdistan (PEJAK). An American RQ-7 Shadow and a Hermes UAV have crashed in Iran. Seymour Hersh stated that the United States has also been penetrating eastern Iran from Afghanistan in a hunt for underground installations developing nuclear weapons.

In March 2006, the Party for a Free Life in Kurdistan (PEJAK), an opposition group closely linked to the Kurdistan Workers Party (PKK) killed 24 members of the Iranian security forces. The PEJAK is linked to the PKK, which is listed by the US State Department as a Foreign Terrorist Organization. Dennis Kucinich stated in an April 18, 2006 letter to Bush that PEJAK was supported and coordinated by the United States, since it is based in Iraq, which is under the de facto control of American military forces. In November 2006, journalist Seymour Hersh in The New Yorker supported this claim, stating that the American military and the Israelis are giving the group equipment, training, and targeting information in order to create internal pressures in Iran.

On April 3, 2007, the American Broadcasting Company (ABC) stated that the United States had supported Jundullah since 2005. The Washington Times has described Jundullah as a militant Islamic organization based in Waziristan, Pakistan, and affiliated with Al-Qaeda that has claimed to kill approximately 400 Iranian soldiers.

The United States has escalated its covert operations against Iran, according to current and former military, intelligence, and congressional sources. They state that Bush sought up to $400 million for these military operations, which were described in a secret presidential finding and are designed to destabilize Iran's religious leadership. The covert activities involve support of the minority Ahwazi Arab and Baluchi groups and other dissident organizations. United States Special Operations Forces have been conducting cross-border operations from southern Iraq, with presidential authorization, since 2007. The scale and the scope of the operations in Iran, which involve the CIA and the Joint Special Operations Command (JSOC), were significantly expanded in 2008.

In January 2009, The New York Times reported that the United States had rejected a 2008 appeal from Israel to attack Iran's main nuclear complex.

== Iraqi insurgency ==
Iran has been accused by the United States of giving weapons and support to the Iraqi insurgency (which includes the terrorist group al-Qaeda). The United States State Department states that weapons are smuggled into Iraq and used to arm Iran's allies among the Shiite militias, including those of the anti-American cleric Muqtada al-Sadr and his Mahdi army. Evidence for this is that weapons, including mortars, rockets and munitions bear Iranian markings. US commanders report that these bombs inflicted 30 percent of all American military casualties in Iraq excluding Al Anbar Governorate, where these weapons have not been found. Furthermore, US intelligence has obtained satellite photographs of three training camps for Iraqi insurgents near Iran's capital where they are allegedly trained guerrilla tactics, kidnapping and assassination.

U.S. Director of National Intelligence Michael McConnell stated in an interview with the Council on Foreign Relations that there was overwhelming evidence that Iran was arming the insurgency in Iraq. During his address to the United States Congress on September 11, 2007, Commanding officer for the United States forces in Iraq, General David Petraeus noted that the multinational forces in Iraq have found that Iran's Quds force has provided training, equipment, funding, and direction to terrorists. "When we captured the leaders of these so-called special groups ... and the deputy commander of a Lebanese Hezbollah department that was created to support their efforts in Iraq, we've learned a great deal about how Iran has, in fact, supported these elements and how those elements have carried out violent acts against our forces, Iraqi forces and innocent civilians." In a speech on 31 January 2007, Iraqi prime minister Nouri al-Maliki said that Iran was supporting attacks against Coalition forces in Iraq.

== Debate over possible U.S. military action ==
=== U.S. opposition to potential war ===
Organized opposition to a possible future military attack against Iran by the United States is known to have started in 2005. Beginning in early 2005, journalists, activists, and academics such as Seymour Hersh, Scott Ritter, Joseph Cirincione, and Jorge E. Hirsch began publishing claims that American concerns over the alleged threat posed by Iran's nuclear program might lead the US government to take military action against that country in the future. These reports, and the concurrent escalation of tensions between Iran and some Western governments, prompted the formation of grassroots organisations, including Campaign Against Sanctions and Military Intervention in Iran in the US and the United Kingdom, to advocate against potential military strikes on Iran. Additionally, several organizations and individuals, including the Director-General of the International Atomic Energy Agency, Mohamed ElBaradei, a former United Nations weapons inspector in Iraq, Scott Ritter, the Non-Aligned Movement of 118 states, and the Arab League, have publicly stated their opposition to a hypothetical attack on Iran.

=== Military planning and preparations ===
From 2005 to early 2007, concerns grew over possible U.S. and Israeli military action against Iran’s nuclear program. Reports and analysts—including Seymour Hersh, and Scott Ritter, —suggested that both countries were actively planning for potential strikes. The U.S. began increasing its military presence in the Persian Gulf, including deploying a second aircraft carrier. Israeli plans to strike Iran’s Natanz facility using bunker-busters were reported but officially denied. Iran responded with threats of retaliation and bolstered its air defenses with advanced Russian systems.

=== Iranian fears for a US attack ===
In 2006, the United States passed the Iran Freedom and Support Act, which appropriated millions of dollars for human rights non-governmental organizations (NGOs) working in Iran. Several politicians in both countries have claimed the Act is a "stepping stone to war", although the Act prohibits the use of force against Iran.

In May 2007, Iran's top diplomat Foreign Minister Manouchehr Mottaki stated that Iran is "ready to talk" to the United States. That month, Iran announced willingness, under certain conditions, to improve its relations with the United States despite having passed up the opportunity for direct talks at the Iraq conference in Sharm El-Sheikh on May 3, 2007. The conference had been seen by the Americans as an opportunity to get closer to the Iranians and exchange gestures in a public forum.

== Sanctions and diplomatic confrontations ==
=== 2006 sanctions against Iranian institutions ===
Pushing for international sanctions against Iran because of its nuclear program, the United States accused Iran of providing logistical and financial support to Shi'a militias in Iraq. Iran denied this claim. The American government imposed sanctions on an Iranian bank on September 8, 2006, barring it from direct or indirect dealings with American financial institutions. The move against Bank Saderat Iran was announced by the undersecretary for treasury, who accused the bank of transferring funds for terrorist groups, including $50,000,000 to Hezbollah. While Iranian financial institutions are barred from directly accessing the American financial system, they are permitted to do so indirectly through banks in other countries. He said the United States government would also persuade European financial institutions not to deal with Iran.

=== 2007: US raids Iran Consulate General ===
In 2007, US forces raided the Iranian Consulate General located in Erbil, Iraq and arrested five staff members. It was said that American forces landed their helicopters around the building, broke through the consulate's gate, disarmed the guards, confiscated documents, arrested five staff members, and left for an undisclosed location. People living in the neighborhood were told they could not leave their homes. Three people who left their homes were arrested, and a wife of one of these men confirmed her husband's arrest.

Russian Minister of Foreign Affairs Mikhail Kamynin said that the raid was an unacceptable violation of the Vienna Convention on Consular Relations. The Kurdistan Regional Government also expressed their disapproval.

At a hearing in Iraq on January 11, 2007, United States Senator Joseph Biden, chairman of the Senate Foreign Relations Committee, told Rice that the Bush administration did not have the authority to send American troops on cross-border raids. Biden said, "I believe the present authorization granted the president to use force in Iraq does not cover that, and he does need congressional authority to do that. I just want to set that marker". Biden sent a follow-up letter to the White House asking for an explanation on the matter.

The same day, Iran's foreign ministry sent a letter to Iraq's foreign ministry, asking Iraq to stop the United States from interfering with Iran–Iraq relations. The official said, "We expect the Iraqi government to take immediate measures to set the aforesaid individuals free and to condemn the US troopers for the measure. Following up on the case and releasing the arrestees is a responsibility of primarily the Iraqi government and then the local government and officials of the Iraqi Kurdistan".

On November 9, American forces released two Iranian diplomats after 305 days, as well as seven other Iranian citizens. The officials were captured in the raid, and the others had been picked up in different parts of the country and held for periods ranging from three months to three years. American officials said, "The release followed a careful review of individual records to determine if they posed a security threat to Iraq, and if their detention was of continued intelligence value".

== Incidents and concluding developments ==
=== 2008 naval dispute ===
In January 2008, the U.S. accused Iran of harassing its naval vessels in the Strait of Hormuz, presenting audio and video evidence that included threats. Iran denied the claim, with some Iranians suggesting the accent in the recording didn't sound Iranian. Iran released its own video, omitting the threats, and accused the U.S. of sensationalizing the incident. There was confusion about the source of the threats, with some speculating that a local heckler, known as the "Filipino Monkey," might have been responsible.

=== Covert action against Iran ===
In 2008, New Yorker reporter Seymour Hersh detailed American covert action plans against Iran involving the CIA, Defense Intelligence Agency (DIA), and Special Forces. Journalist David Ignatius of The Washington Post asserted that American covert action "appears to focus on political action and the collection of intelligence rather than on lethal operations". Iranian commentator Ali Eftagh stated that the covert actions are being made public by the American government as a form of psychological warfare.

=== Diplomatic and legal developments ===
A meeting in Baghdad in May 2007 between The U.S. and Iranian ambassadors to Iraq marked the highest-level meeting since 1980, when the United States cut diplomatic ties with Iran following the seizure of the U.S. Embassy in Tehran and the hostage crisis. The four-hour meeting was described as cordial and focused exclusively on the situation in Iraq.

A former Iranian diplomat, Nosratollah Tajik, was arrested in the UK and accused by the United States of smuggling arms. He initially appeared in court on April 19, 2007, fighting extradition to the US. Between 2009 and 2011, the U.S. failed to respond to UK inquiries about Tajik’s extradition, raising concerns about due process. On November 27, 2012, the UK High Court blocked the extradition, citing the prolonged U.S. delay as a breach of legal standards, and ordered his release.

== See also ==
- Foreign relations of Iran
- Foreign policy of the George W. Bush administration
- Iran–United States relations during the Obama administration
- Iran–United States relations during the first Trump administration
- Iran–United States relations during the Biden administration
- Iran–United States relations during the second Trump administration
- Views on military action against Iran
