= Fabian Molina =

Swiss politician (born 1990)

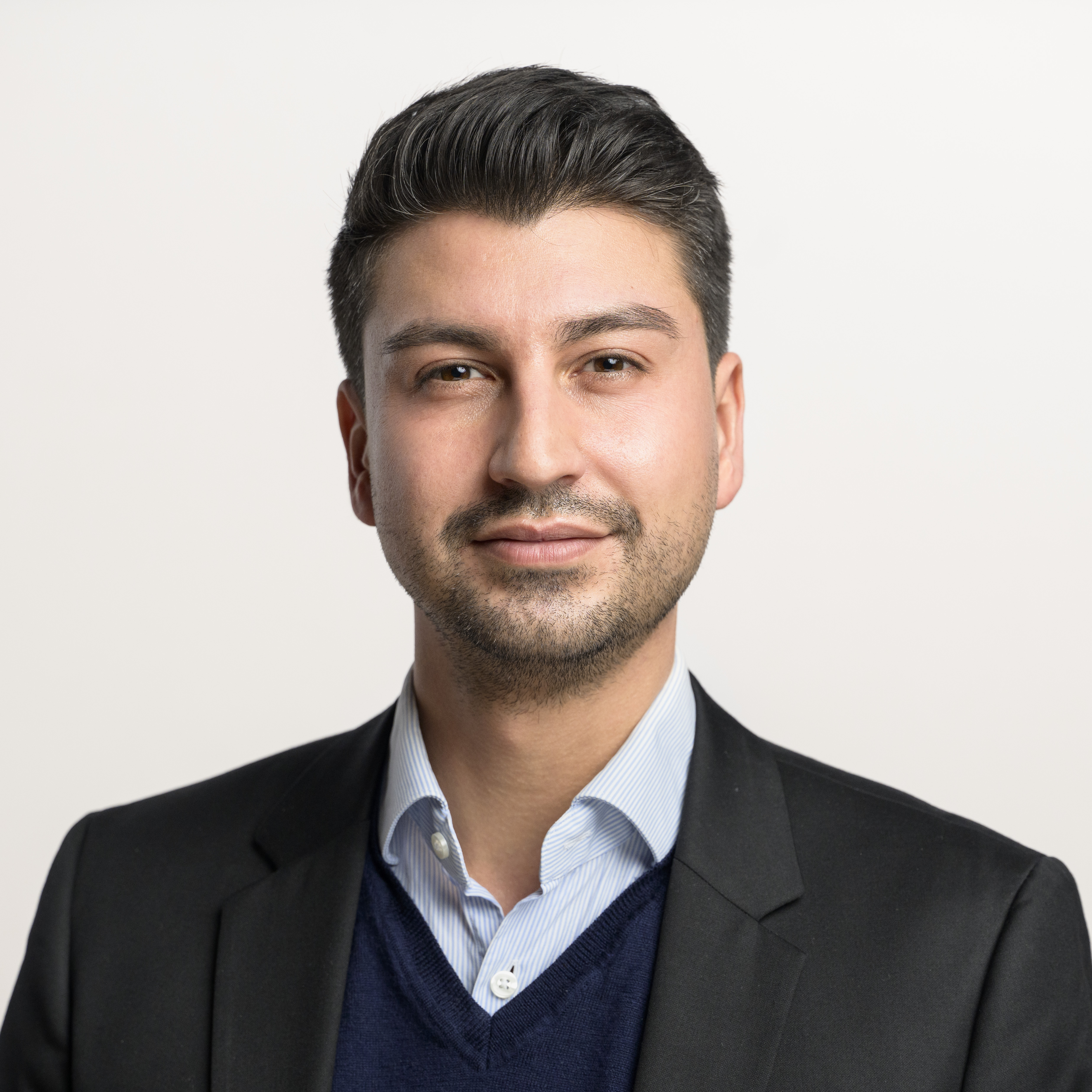

Member of National Council
- Incumbent
- Assumed office 15 March 2018
- Preceded by: Tim Guldimann
- Constituency: Canton of Zürich

President of Young Socialists Switzerland
- In office 16 March 2014 – 31 May 2016

Personal details
- Born: 8 July 1990 (age 36) Uster, Switzerland
- Citizenship: Switzerland; Chile (automatically)
- Party: Social Democratic Party
- Education: University of Zürich (dropped out)
- Website: Official website

Fabian Molina (born 8 July 1990) is a Swiss politician who currently serves on the National Council for the Social Democratic Party since 2018. He succeeded Tim Guldimann and became the youngest member of the National Council (Switzerland) ever to be elected aged 28. He previously served as President of the Young Socialists between 2014 and 2016 as well as on the Cantonal Council of Zürich from 2017 to 2018. Since 2019, he is co-president of Swissaid.

== Early life and education ==
Molina was born 8 July 1990 in Uster, Switzerland to Jorge Molina, a print shop owner, who came to Switzerland from Chile in 1982 after being imprisoned thirteen times for socialist activism and being a supporter of Salvador Allende. He has two elder half-brothers and a younger brother and primarily was raised in Illnau-Effretikon. Molina completed his Matura in 2011, after failing one year prior and continued to study at University of Zürich where he majored in History and Philosophy (didn't graduate).

== Political career ==
Fabian Molina joined the SP in 2006. From 2007 to 2009, he was a board member of SP Illnau-Effretikon. At the same time, in 2008, he founded the social democratic youth wing (Juso) Illnau-Effretikon. In 2009, he was elected Co-President of the Juso Canton Zurich. In 2010, he was elected to the municipal council of Illnau-Effretikon, where he served until his resignation in 2016. In 2015, he was a candidate for the Swiss National Council on the list of SP in the Canton of Zurich. On national level, Fabian Molina presided the Juso Switzerland from March 2014 and announced his resignation as a president in June 2016 at Juso Switzerland's 2016 annual meeting and expressed a desire for a female successor. In August 2017, he joined the Zurich Cantonal Council for the Pfäffikon constituency. On 15 March 2018 he moved up as National Council after his predecessor Tim Guldimann's resignation. In the 2019 parliamentary elections, Molina was able to defend its seat in the National Council with 81,905 votes. He became a member of the Foreign Affairs Committee of the National Council, to which he still belongs today. In addition, he serves as Head of Foreign Policy for the SP Switzerland and, in this capacity, represents his party in the presidium of the Party of European Socialists and in the Progressive Alliance. In this role, he regularly represents the SP Switzerland at international conferences.

In the 2019 parliamentary elections, Molina was re-elected to the National Council with 81,905 votes. He also became a member of the Parliamentary Control Committee. After the 2023 elections, he joined the Security Policy Committee. Since August 2025, he has been a member of the Parliamentary Assembly of the Council of Europe.

== Political profile ==
Molina was Youth Secretary at the Swiss national labour union Unia from 2011 to 2014. He is also a member of Amnesty International, Greenpeace, Group Switzerland without Army (GSoA), Public Eye, and Solidar Suisse. From early 2017 to 2018, Molina held a position as a research assistant at the Swiss non-governmental organisation Swissaid and has been Co-President since 6 June 2019.

A prominent figure in national media, he has raised regular attention both in national and international press. He called, for instance, to hoist the multi-coloured Peace Flag instead of the Swiss Flag on 1 August 2014 (Switzerland's national day) to commemorate 100 years of the general mobilization for World War I. In 2015, in cooperation with other political groups, Molina and his Juso took the referendum against the new Intelligence Service Act (Nachrichtendienstgesetz). Furthermore, he took a leading role in the vote on the popular initiative "Stop Speculation on Food Crops" ("Keine Spekulation mit Nahrungsmitteln!") that came to a popular vote on 2 February 2016, and was rejected.

Molina describes himself as a “European” and serves as president of the Zurich section of the European Movement Switzerland, which advocates for Switzerland’s accession to the European Union (EU). He believes that EU membership would bring economic and democratic benefits to Switzerland and that the country should contribute to European integration. Molina also supports closer security cooperation between Switzerland and the EU. In 2025, he persuaded the National Council’s Security Policy Committee to urge the Federal Council to conclude a security and defence agreement with the EU, which the Federal Council subsequently recommended for implementation. At the same time, Molina is a critic of NATO, arguing that it entrenches Europe’s dependence on the United States. In his view, a closer alignment of Switzerland with NATO would endanger the country’s policy of military non-alignment.

Molina is an advocate of economic democracy. Through parliamentary initiatives and within a working group of the Social Democratic Party (SP), he promotes better conditions for alternative economic models.

In 2021, contrary to his party’s official position, Molina supported the EFTA–Indonesia Economic Partnership Agreement in the referendum campaign. He argued that the agreement represented an important step toward effective sustainability standards in Swiss trade policy that could serve as a foundation for future agreements. The agreement was narrowly approved in the popular vote.

During the COVID-19 pandemic, Molina campaigned for the protection of vulnerable groups and expressed support for a mandatory vaccination policy.

In 2022, he participated in an unauthorized demonstration in Zurich against a march by the far-right group Junge Tat. He posted a photo of himself at the event on Instagram with the caption "Züri stabil nazifrei" ("Zurich steady, free of Nazis") and praised the antifascist movement on social media. Earlier, he had described “antifascists” as heroes. His participation sparked controversy, with right-wing outlets such as Die Weltwoche and Nebelspalter accusing him of condoning property damage and mocking him for wearing a face mask. Molina later received a fine for attending an unapproved event. On 12 December 2023, the National Council adopted a postulate tabled by Molina calling on the Federal Council to compile statistics on violent right-wing extremist, racist and antisemitic groups in Switzerland.

As president of Swissaid, Molina advocates for a strong Swiss development cooperation policy. He considers the reduction of poverty and hunger, as well as the promotion of peace, to be central responsibilities of neutral Switzerland.

Molina also views the promotion of democracy and human rights as a key pillar of Swiss foreign policy and criticizes the official focus on foreign investment and trade promotion. He has been a critic of the Switzerland–China Free Trade Agreement, calling for human rights to play a central role in Swiss–Chinese relations and for Switzerland to align its China policy more closely with that of the EU. Switzerland’s first China Strategy (2021) originated from one of his parliamentary initiatives. He is a member of the Inter-Parliamentary Alliance on China and co-president of the parliamentary groups on Tibet and Taiwan. In these roles, he met the 14th Dalai Lama in Zurich in 2018 and Taiwanese President Tsai Ing-wen during a visit in 2023.

Following Russia’s invasion of Ukraine, Molina called for Switzerland to adopt the EU sanctions against Russia and to increase civilian and financial support for Ukraine, while maintaining Swiss neutrality. He repeatedly criticized what he viewed as the Federal Council’s overly lenient stance toward Russia and succeeded in pushing for tougher action against Russian spies in Switzerland.

In 2019, during an SP conference titled "Equal Opportunities, Equal Rights: A Democratic Turkey for All" – held at the Federal Palace with representatives of the Turkish sister parties HDP and CHP, and co-organized by Molina – a convicted Al-Qaeda supporter gained access to the event. Molina and his party later apologized for the oversight.

Molina is a member of the parliamentary friendship group Switzerland–Palestine. In 2017 and 2022, he opposed classifying Hamas as a terrorist organization. In 2023, however, he condemned the Hamas terror attack on Israel and subsequently called for a ban on Hamas. Shortly after the attack, he met with the relatives of Israeli hostages at the Federal Palace, urging their release, the punishment of the perpetrators, and renewed efforts toward a negotiated peace. As Israel’s offensive in Gaza intensified, he demanded compliance with international humanitarian law and measures to protect civilians. Later in the conflict, he supported sanctions against Israel and criticized Foreign Minister Ignazio Cassis for suspending funding to UNRWA, advocating for its swift reinstatement – which occurred on 30 April 2024. In May 2024, Molina called for the recognition of the State of Palestine, arguing in a parliamentary debate that extremist forces in both Israel and Palestine were undermining a two-state solution.
