= Humanitarian impacts of U.S. sanctions against Iran =

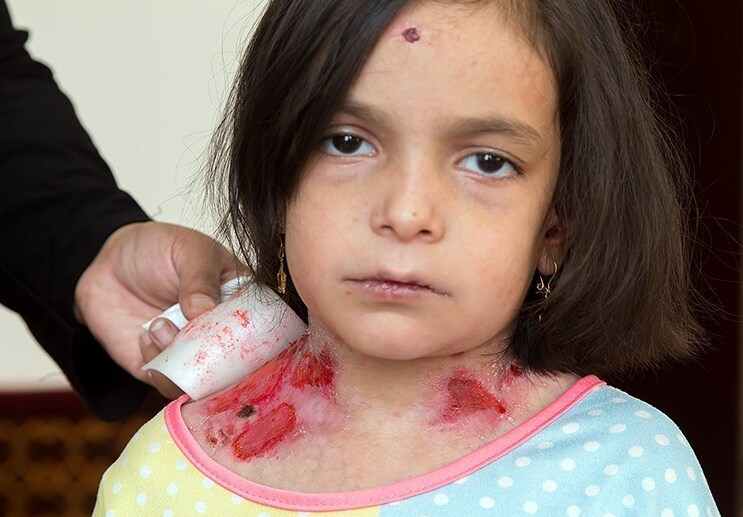
- An Iranian girl with EB sores around her neck
- Outcome: Negative impact on Iranians' right to health, education, and other human rights aspects
- Deaths: Approximately 30 Iranian patients with EB —mostly children A haemophilic teenage boy
- Accused: U.S. sanctions against Iran

The United States sanctions against Iran have had negative humanitarian impacts on Iranian society. Due to the broad nature of the sanctions, Iranians' right to health, education, and other human rights aspects have been adversely impacted. U.S. secondary sanctions have led to "over-compliance" by some companies. Sanctions have had an impact on people's life in addition to the availability of drugs.

Children with epidermolysis bullosa, also known as butterfly kids, haemophilics and people with HIV disease are among the most affected vulnerable groups. U.S. sanctions have also hindered Iran's ability to combat the outbreak of the COVID-19 pandemic.

== U.S. sanctions against Iran ==
Since 1979, the United States has imposed various sanctions on economic, trade, scientific and military aspects against Iran. The U.S. sanctions against Iran include an embargo on dealings with the country by the U.S., and a ban on selling aircraft and repair parts to Iranian aviation companies.

== Humanitarian aspects ==
The U.S. sanctions against Iran are accompanied by negative humanitarian impacts. According to international law, the United States must assess the impact of its sanctions on Iranians' rights and address any breaches caused by sanctions. Because of the vast network of US sanctions, banks and firms have withdrawn from humanitarian trade with Iran, leaving Iranians with rare or severe diseases unable to obtain the medicine and treatments needed.In general The devastating effects of sanctions directly and indirectly on health have significantly reduced financial and physical access to drugs and medical equipment in Iran, leading to a substantial decline in public health.

According to Alena Douhan, the U.N. special rapporteur on unilateral coercive measures, the groups including "[people with] severe diseases, disabled people, Afghan refugees, women-led households and children" are adversely affected by the measures. She added that "sanctions have been substantially exacerbating the humanitarian situation in Iran."

According to Ali Gorja, more people have died as a result of American sanctions on various nations, including Iran, Iraq, Cuba, Libya and former Yugoslavia, than from the US-Iraq war.

== Medical and pharmaceutical aspects ==
Pharmaceuticals and medical equipment do not fall under international sanctions, but Iran is facing shortages of drugs for the treatment of 30 illnesses—including cancer, heart and breathing problems, thalassemia and multiple sclerosis (MS)—because it is not allowed to use international payment systems. According to a survey by the Woodrow Wilson International Center for Scholars, drug imports to Iran from the United States and Europe declined by around 30% in 2012.

In 2013, the Guardian stated that over 85,000 cancer patients required rare forms of chemotherapy and radiotherapy. Western governments had established exemptions within the sanctions regime to ensure that vital medications could get through, but these exemptions were in conflict with blanket banking restrictions and limits on "dual-use" chemicals that may have both a medical and a military function.

=== Butterfly children ===
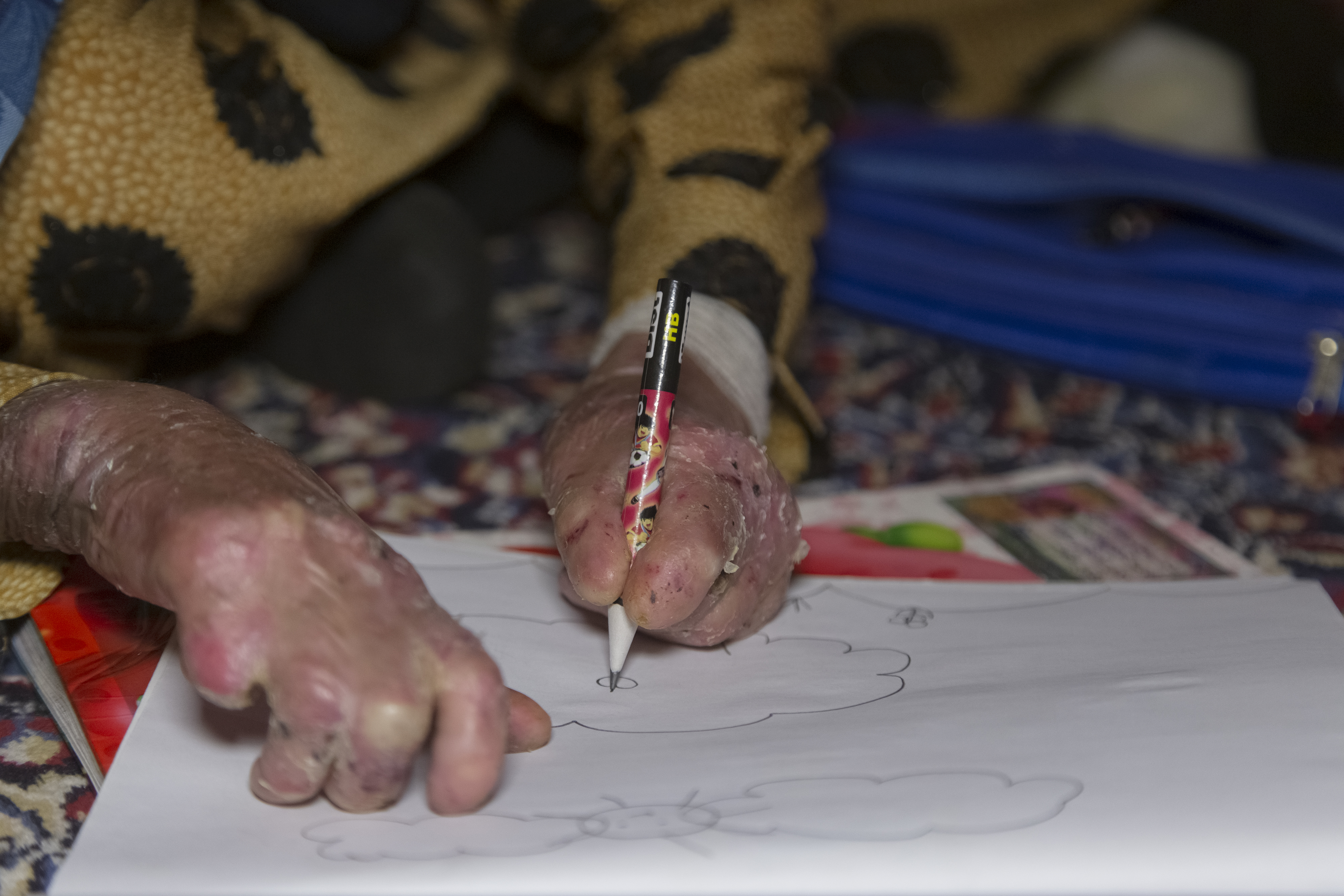
A child with EB, from south of Kerman province, Iran.

The epidermolysis bullosa (EB) is a severe and potentially fatal skin condition that causes excruciatingly painful wounds and is mostly seen in children, who are dubbed "butterfly kids" due to their delicate skin. The skin sores for those with EB becomes so painful that the patients often compare their skin to third-degree burns. Speaking to Aljazeera, an Iranian EB patient compared the pain with "boiling water, drop by drop falling on your skin." In spite of this, Mölnlycke Health Care, a Swedish company that manufactures, Mepilex absorbent foam dressing, the bandages that are said to be the most effective therapy for their condition, has decided to stop shipments to Iran due to fears about secondary sanctions as a result of over-compliance. The Iranian Centre for International Criminal Law (ICICL), based in The Hague, stated in 2021 that approximately 30 Iranian patients with EB —mostly children—have died since Mölnlycke ceased selling its wound dressing to Iran. In response to an inquiry by EB Home, an Iranian NGO that helped provide Iranian EB patients with the Swedish dressing, Molnlycke company stated in March 2019 that due to the U.S. sanctions it "decided not to conduct any business with relation to Iran for the time being".

On 19 December 2019, the Iranian ambassador to the UN, Majid Takht Ravanchi, addressed the UN Security Council and mentioned a two-year-old girl, Ava who died due to EB, in his remarks:

"Nowadays, the importation of these special bandages for EBs has become almost impossible, endangering the lives of innocent children like Ava. Now butterflies are feeling the pain of the U.S. inhumane sanctions with their hearts and souls. In June this year, Ava was relieved of pain forever and passed away. Her story only reflects the tip of the iceberg, as children and adults with cancer and rare diseases are struggling in silence with death. Killing children and patients takes no courage!”

—

=== Haemophilia ===
Approximately 40,000 haemophilics were unable to obtain blood-clotting medications, and operations on haemophiliacs were effectively postponed due to the risks posed by the shortages. A haemophilic teenage boy died from his illness as a result of a pharmaceutical shortage caused by the sanctions.

=== HIV/AIDS ===
An estimated 73,000 Iranians living with HIV/AIDS have very limited access to the medications they require to stay healthy. Interrupting HIV treatment due to lack of anti-retroviral medications can cause the HIV virus to mutate, resulting in resistant strains of the HIV virus, making it harder to treat. HIV medications, are crucial for managing HIV infection by suppressing the HIV virus. HIV medications can also maintain an undetectable viral count, making it impossible for the virus to replicate and transmit to others through sexual contact, blood transfusions, needles or breastfeeding. This is critical for preventing HIV transmission and reducing the spread of the epidemic globally ( Undetectable = Untransmittable ).

=== Blood Disorders ===
The organization representing the 8,000 Iranians with thalassemia, an inherited blood disorder, reported that its members were starting to die given the lack of an essential medicine, deferoxamine, needed to regulate the iron content of the blood. In addition, Iran was unable to purchase medical equipment such as autoclaves, which are required for the creation of numerous medications, since some of the largest Western pharmaceutical corporations declined to carry out business with the country.

Specialty medications such as the blood thinner medication Rivaroxaban, sold under the brand name Xarelto, has become very difficult to find and procure in Iran due to the U.S. sanctions. Blood thinner medications such as Xarelto are used to help prevent blood clotting for high risk patients.

=== During the COVID-19 pandemic ===
During the COVID-19 pandemic, China, the United Kingdom, the Group of 77, and experts urged the United States to ease sanctions on Iran to assist it in combating the increasing coronavirus outbreak. "There is no doubt that Iran’s capacity to respond to the novel coronavirus has been hampered by the Trump administration's economic sanctions, and the death toll is likely much higher than it would have been as a result," Center for Economic and Policy Research (CEPR) Co-director Mark Weisbrot said. He added that there was no doubt that the sanctions had hindered Iran's ability to contain the outbreak, resulting in more illnesses and potentially the virus' spreading outside the country's boundaries.

The management of the COVID-19 crisis in Iran was made more complicated as a result of the sanctions consequences. Human Rights Watch issued a statement on April 6, 2020, urging the US to ease sanctions against Iran so that Iran could have "access to crucial humanitarian resources during the [coronavirus] pandemic."

Bloomberg reported in October 2020 that US sanctions had blocked the shipping of 2 million doses of influenza vaccination. The Red Crescent Society of Iran reported that the severe economic sanctions rendered the local Shahr Bank insolvent, thereby halting the vital cargo.

== See also ==
- Maximum pressure campaign
