= Filipino Monkey =

Taunt used in VHF marine radio

"Filipino Monkey" is a taunt used by radio pranksters in maritime radio transmissions since at least the 1980s, especially in the Persian Gulf. This taunt is also used as a name for pranksters who make odd, confusing, or even threatening calls on VHF marine channel 16, which is the VHF calling and distress channel. Ships at sea are required to monitor the channel, which is meant to be used only to make contact before changing to a working channel.

== History ==
In the late 1980s in the Persian Gulf, there was much Filipino imported labor, in particular maritime labor. Late at night, Arab and Persian natives would taunt Filipinos from the anonymity of the radio. An account of U.S. operations during Operation Earnest Will in the Persian Gulf in 1988 contains this description of a typical nighttime broadcasts:

From time to time, the radio squawked, breaking the quiet with a burst of static. Most of the messages were fully routine, the expected traffic in a crowded sea. But every so often a high manic voice would break from the speaker: "Hee hee hee! Filipino Monkey!" No one knew who the caller was, or what he meant by his strange message."

Some report that the phrase originated as an insult to Filipino seaman watchkeepers monitoring the VHF distress channel.

=== January 2008 American–Iranian naval incident ===
On January 7, 2008, the government of the United States of America reported that the day before a number of Iranian IRGC Navy speedboats had harassed and threatened U.S. warships traveling through the Strait of Hormuz, a narrow passageway between the Persian Gulf and the Gulf of Oman. In a video clip released by the administration, a crew member on a warship issues this radio message:

This is coalition warship. I am engaged in transit passage in accordance with international law. I maintain no harm. Over!

This is followed by footage of smaller speedboats traveling at high speed around U.S. warships. The crew member is heard on the radio warning five unidentified craft that they are approaching coalition warships and asking them to identify themselves and report their intentions. Later, the crew member is heard warning the crafts to stay away. Then a heavily accented voice is heard replying:

I am coming to you ... You will explode after few minutes.

The incident occurred three days before President Bush was due to travel to Israel and Arab states of the Persian Gulf for talks on the Israeli-Palestinian relations, U.S. arms sales to the Arab states of the Persian Gulf, and the American claim that Iran was a dangerous nation with intentions of producing nuclear weapons (see Nuclear program of Iran). The White House said the incident was an example of irresponsible, provocative, and aggressive behavior by the Iranian government, with President Bush warning that "all options are on the table to secure" U.S. military assets

Iranian government played down the incident as nothing but a routine encounter occurring between naval vessels for the purpose of identifying each other and later released its own video clip of the incident, recorded on one of the Iranian speedboats. This clip begins with moving images of a number of warships and an Iranian voice is heard, in Persian, attempting to read the side number of one of the warships ("73"). Later an Iranian IRGC naval personnel is shown speaking into a radio transmitter, at some distance from a number of warships.

Navy warship 73; This is Iranian navy patrol boat on channel 16. Come in! Over!

An American voice is heard replying:

This is coalition warship 73. Roger! Over!

After a repeat of the conversation the Iranian personnel is heard asking the coalition warship to switch to channel 11 with the American voice replying that they were shifting to channel 11. The Iranians are heard shifting to channel 11 and continuing their conversation with the warship personnel. The clip ends, showing no confrontation or threatening language used by either side.

Having compared the two clips and the voices heard on the radio, a number of news correspondents reported that the threatening voice heard in the American clip is very much unlike that of the Iranian naval personnel shown in the Iranian clip and that it was likely that the threatening voice heard on the U.S. Navy clip may, in fact, be that of a prankster given the nickname 'Filipino Monkey'.
